= Wyon =

Several members of the Wyon family were noted medal makers:

- Thomas Wyon the elder (1767–1830), British engraver
- Peter Wyon (1797–1822), British engraver
- Thomas Wyon (1792–1817), British engraver
- William Wyon (1795–1851), British engraver
- Benjamin Wyon (1802–1858), British engraver
- Leonard Charles Wyon (1826–1891), British engraver
- Joseph Shepherd Wyon (1836–1873), British engraver
- Alfred Benjamin Wyon (1837–1884), British engraver
- Edward Alexander Wyon (1842−1872), British architect and poet
- Olive Wyon (1881–1966), British author and translator
- Allan Wyon (1843–1907), British engraver
- Allan G. Wyon (1882–1962), British die-engraver and sculptor
