= Wyon family =

Extended English family of engravers

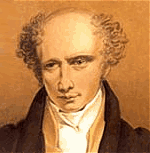
William Wyon (1795 – 1851)

The Wyon family was an English family of traditional die-engravers and medallists, many of whom went on to work in prominent roles at the Royal Mint or as engravers in a family die business. Starting from Peter George (II) Wyon who migrated to England from Cologne, Germany many subsequent descendants of have made notable contribution to British numismatics. Over the course of the 19th-century two members of the family became Chief Engraver at the Royal Mint with many more involved in coin design.

- Peter George (II) Wyon
  - George Wyon (d.1796)
    - Thomas Wyon the elder (1767–1830)
      - Thomas Wyon (1792–1817)
      - Benjamin Wyon (1802–1858)
        - Alfred Benjamin Wyon (1837-1884)
        - Joseph Shepherd Wyon (1836-1873)
        - Allan Wyon (1843–1907) -M- Harriet Gairdner
          - Olive Wyon (1881–1966)
          - Allan G. Wyon 1882–1962) -M- Eileen May Trench
            - 1 Daughter
          - Guy Alfred Wyon (1883–1924), pathologist
      - Edward William Wyon (1811–1885) -M- Elizabeth Smyth
        - Edward Alexander Wyon (1842–1872)
    - William Wyon (1795–1851)
      - Leonard Charles Wyon (1826–1891)
    - Peter Wyon (1797–1822)
    - George Wyon (1771) -M- Elizabeth Phillips
      - James Wyon (1804–1868)
        - George William Wyon (1836–1862)
        - Henry Wyon (1834–1856)
      - John George Wyon (1806)
        - Edward Wyon(1857-1906)
