= Edward William Wyon =

English sculptor

- Born: 12 January 1811; Southwark, Surrey, England
- Died: 1885 (aged 73–74)
- Known for: Sculpture

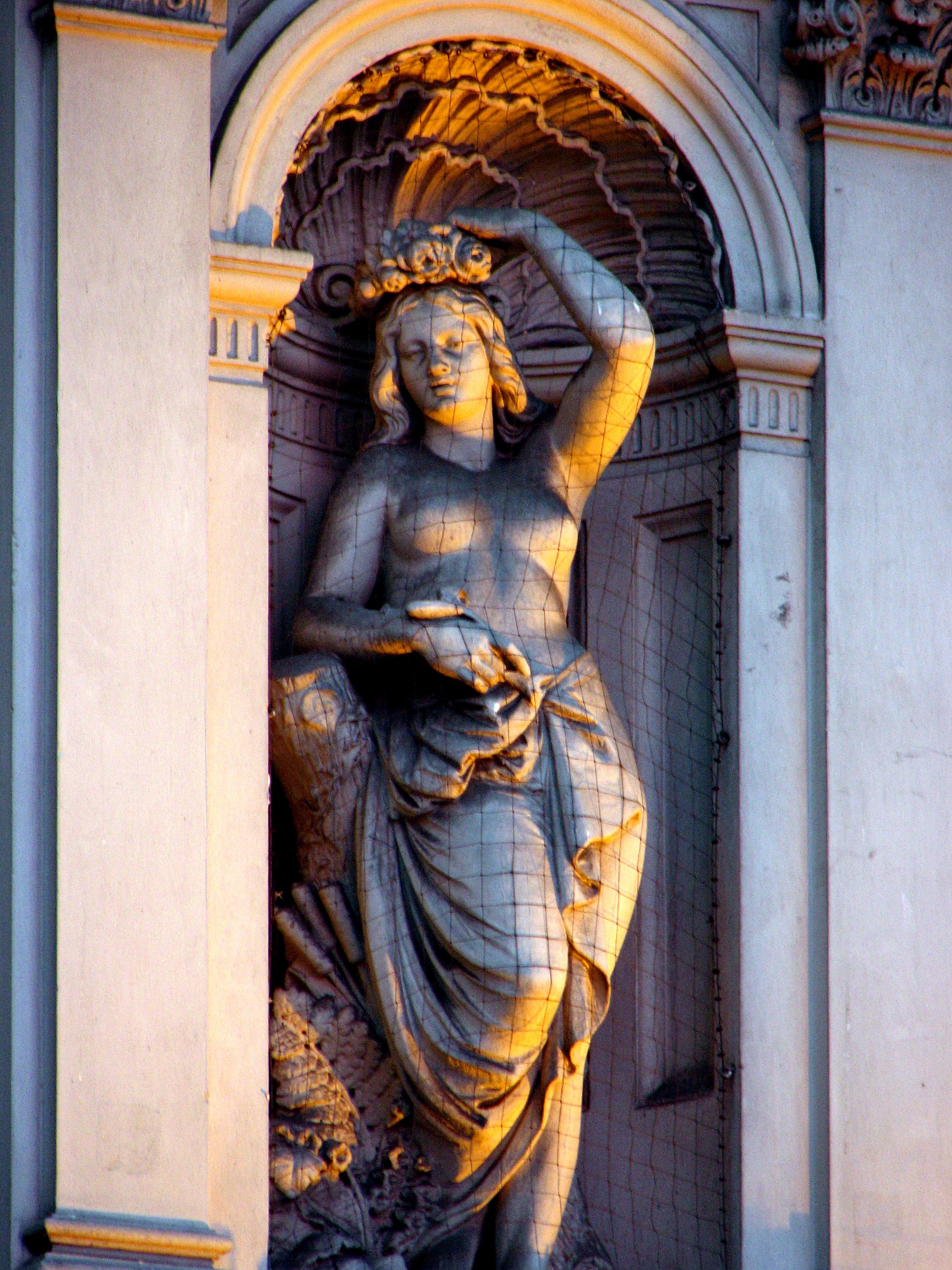
A statue provided by Wyon for the Criterion Theatre in London.

Edward William Wyon (12 January 1811 – 1885) was an English sculptor. He is known for his busts, medals and architectural sculpture.

== Biography ==
Edward William Wyon was born on 12 January 1811 in Southwark, then part of Surrey but now in London. He was the third son of Thomas Wyon the Elder, who worked as the chief engraver of seals at the Royal Mint, and the younger brother of Thomas Wyon the Younger and Benjamin Wyon. He would marry Elizabeth Smyth in 1841 in Marylebone, and the two would four children including, Edward Alexander Wyon, born 1842, who would become an architect and poet.

Wyon would begin his artistic training in 1829 at the Royal Academy Schools and begin exhibiting at the Royal Academy in 1831 continuing to do so for 39 years exhibiting a total of 90 works. He would also have his works exhibited at the Great Exhibition, 1862 International Exhibition, in London and the International Exhibition of Arts and Manufactures in Dublin.

== Works ==
Many of Wyon's exhibited works were busts of living and historical figures, as well as medallions. He was also known for his architectural and funerary sculpture, and providing designs for reproduction in porcelain, particularly by Wedgwood. Considered one of Wyon's most significant works was a reduction of John Flaxman's St Michael Overcoming Satan producing the first sculpture offered by the Art Union.

== See also ==
- Wyon family
