= Maurice Goguel =

French historian (1880–1955)

Henry Maurice Goguel (20 March 1880 – 31 March 1955) was Dean of the Protestant Faculty of Theology in Paris, director of studies at the École pratique des hautes études, and professor at the Sorbonne.

He published a substantial body of work of historical research on early Christianity. His Jesus the Nazarene: Myth or History? was an important rebuttal of the Christ myth theory.

He had three children, Elisabeth Labrousse, a philosopher, historian, and academic, Jean Goguel, a geologist and geophysicist, and François Goguel.

== Selected publications ==
- The Religious Situation in France (1921)
- Jesus the Nazarene: Myth or History? (translation by Frederick Stephens, 1926)
- The Life of Jesus (translation by Olive Wyon, 1933)
- The Birth of Christianity (translation by H. C. Snape, 1953)
- Jesus and the Origins of Christianity (two volumes, 1960)
- The Primitive Church (translation by H. C. Snape, 1963)
