= John Howell & Son =

Construction company

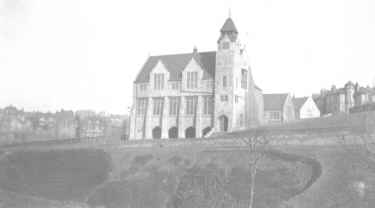
The old Gothic building of Hastings Grammar School: architects: Jeffery & Skiller; engineer John Howell Junior, 1883

John Howell & Son, known as John Howell, was the leading building and engineering company in Hastings, Sussex in the 1860s. Its founder, John Howell Senior (ca.1825−1893) engineered churches and other public buildings in the area to the designs of innovative architects, including Holy Trinity Church in 1860 to the design of Samuel Sanders Teulon, and St Johns Church, Hollington in 1865−1868 for Edward Alexander Wyon. John Howell Junior (1851−1903) constructed the old Gothic Revival Hastings Grammar School building to the design of Jeffery and Skiller in 1883. Howell Senior was a campaigner on behalf of the Liberal Party and held a prominent political position in the town from the 1860s to the 1880s. He came to Hastings as a fatherless boy, but was the Mayor of Hastings by 1878.

== John Howell Senior ==
=== Personal history ===
His mother was Sophia Howell of Birmingham, born around 1792. John Howell was born around 1825 in Birmingham, He married Ann Osborne (b. Winchelsea ca.1827; d. Hastings 1886), at Rye in 1850. She was the daughter of Richard Osborne, a carpenter born around 1791 in Winchelsea. John and Ann had three children: John Junior (born Hastings 1851), Ann (b. 1853) and Sophia (b. 1854). Howell died aged 69 at Hastings on 1 December 1893.

He was born in poverty and was fatherless when he came to Hastings as a child; his life and work were based in Hastings. In boyhood he worked as an apprentice carpenter. In 1841, at age seventeen, he was a carpenter living at White Rock Place, Hastings, with his mother Sophia, a lodging-house keeper, and his sister Sophia (b.ca.1823). He became a journeyman carpenter. In 1851, at the age of twenty-six, he was a carpenter employing nineteen men and living with his wife Ann, aged twenty-four, at 21 White Rock, Hastings. He began his independent work by constructing stables for the Local Board in Waterworks Road, Hastings. By 1857 at the age of 33 he was becoming successful: he took on a brickfield at Silverhill and could accept major contracts as one of the town's biggest employers during the expansion of Hastings. In 1861 he was living at 12 Cambridge Gardens with his wife and three children as well as his widowed father-in-law Richard Osborne, two of Osborne's children and a servant, Caroline Phipps, brought from Winchelsea. In 1871 he was forty-six; a timber merchant and contractor employing 120 men. He was living with his wife and children at 50 Havelock Road. In 1881 he was describing himself as a timber merchant and living with his wife, three unmarried children and three female servants at Priory Mount, Cambridge Gardens. The Census of 1891 saw him as a widower and retired contractor, staying at the Palace Hotel at Fairfield, Derbyshire with his daughter Ann who was still single at age thirty-eight, and his granddaughter Margery Carless, aged four years. In spite of his achievements, he was not the major nineteenth-century building contractor in Hastings; that was Peter Jenkins (1869−1899).

=== Company ===
The Hastings News said that he was "one of the most prominent members of the Victorian building trade (in Hastings)", that "all he touched seemed to turn to gold," and that "he was popular with his workforce for being firm but fair". The company's office was in a large sawmill between Station Road and the top of the east side of Middle Street. In October 1864 the Council had to ask Howell to relieve the local nuisance caused by smoke from the sawmill, and in January 1865 the mill suffered from severe subsidence. The Hastings News said that Howell "had the building shored with nearly forty timber beams, jacks and hydraulic presses. The building was forced back ten to eleven inches over a period of three days". The company organised an annual excursion for the employees: for example on 24 July 1869 seventy men were taken on six wagonettes to the Bell Inn at Northiam, leaving early in the morning and returning at midnight. Howell Senior retired in 1882, and the original company was dissolved, although his son continued in business under the same name.

=== Political life ===
John Howell Senior became a Liberal Party activist in the campaign against the Corn Laws around 1843 when he was a nineteen-year-old apprentice. He was a lifelong campaigner on behalf of the Liberal Party, and was said to have had an effect in Hastings constituency on the 1859 general election. The Tories alleged corruption by Howell but lost their case. Howell's local influence was believed to have assisted two Liberals, Frederick North and Harry Vane, to win the election instead of one Liberal and one Tory as had been expected. After the 1882 council elections:

"The Liberals had issued writs in the High Court of Justice charging Cllrs Edwin Smith (All Saints ward), George Edmed (St Clements ward) and George Archibald Thorpe (Holy Trinity ward) with bribery, undue influence, giving ‘treats’ and hiring vehicles to convey voters to the polls".

The Liberals lost their case, but were still supported by the Hastings News, a Liberal newspaper. In response the Tories issued a writ accusing Howell of perjury, citing the method of payment by Howell to Mr Kendal, a private investigator hired to discover evidence of corruption by the Tories in the 1882 election. The Tories were supported by the Hastings Observer, which "took great delight in the failure of the Liberal case, highlighting the poor quality evidence". The same newspaper "also revived the 1869 case, arguing forcefully that the two Liberals had been elected wrongly". The Tories lost their case against Howell.

Howell was a town councillor in the 1860s and 1870s, although he had to resign as councillor on 11 September 1866 when his tender of £25,640 for the main drainage works was accepted by the Council. He was elected to the first School Board for the borough of Hastings in 1871, and was the first chairman of the Hastings Liberal Association when it was formed in November 1872. He was elected alderman in May 1873, and Mayor of Hastings in 1878. He was elected president of the Liberal Association on 25 January 1883 after he retired from the building business, and was elected councillor representing Holy Trinity Ward on 22 November 1883. This occurred after a husting on 13 September of that year on the cricket ground involving thousands of local people, some bandstands, a fairground, food and an illuminated address to Howell as president of the Hastings Liberal Association.

=== Works ===
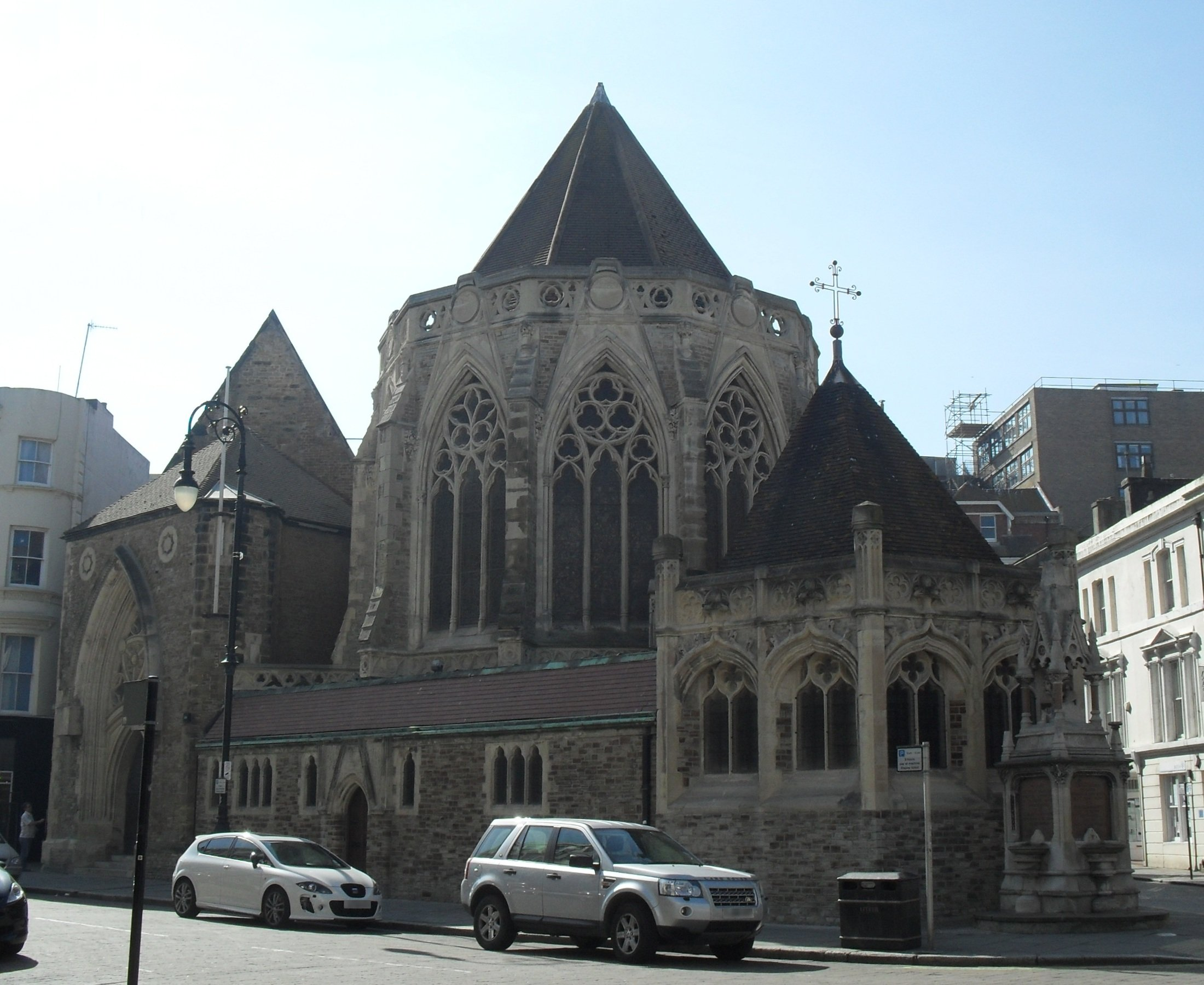
Holy Trinity Church, designed by S.S. Teulon and engineered by Howell Senior, 1860

His first major work was the west side of Warrior Square, completed in 1855. In the same year, Roman coins were found on this site by Howell's workmen. The Music Hall or Central Assembly Room between Robertson Street and Havelock Road, renamed as the Public Hall in 1883, was begun in July 1858 and built speedily; the opening on 12 January 1859 featured Handel's Messiah. It was an Italianate building with its main entrance in Robertson Street. The main hall on the first floor measured 75 feet by 45 feet and 30 feet high, and its staircases gave access to Havelock Road and Robertson Street. The ground floor had a large room for the Hastings Mechanics' Institution at the west end, and shops at the east end, with a shopping arcade running north-south in the centre. There was an arched cellar in the basement. From the 1920s to the 1970s it was a cinema; today it faces Cambridge Road and the ground floor is occupied by public houses, with music in the cellar. Howell built Holy Trinity Church, Robertson Street, in 1860 for architect Samuel Sanders Teulon; the site cost £2,300. The nave was opened on 29 September 1858 and the chancel on 10 August 1862, but it was consecrated as late as 13 April 1882 due to debt. In July of that year there was strike action by the masons when their employer Howell Senior refused to dismiss a non-union man. Holy Trinity is now a listed building. He engineered the basement of the Queens Hotel in 1862; it exists today in the town conservation area without its cupolas and forecourt, and has been converted into flats.

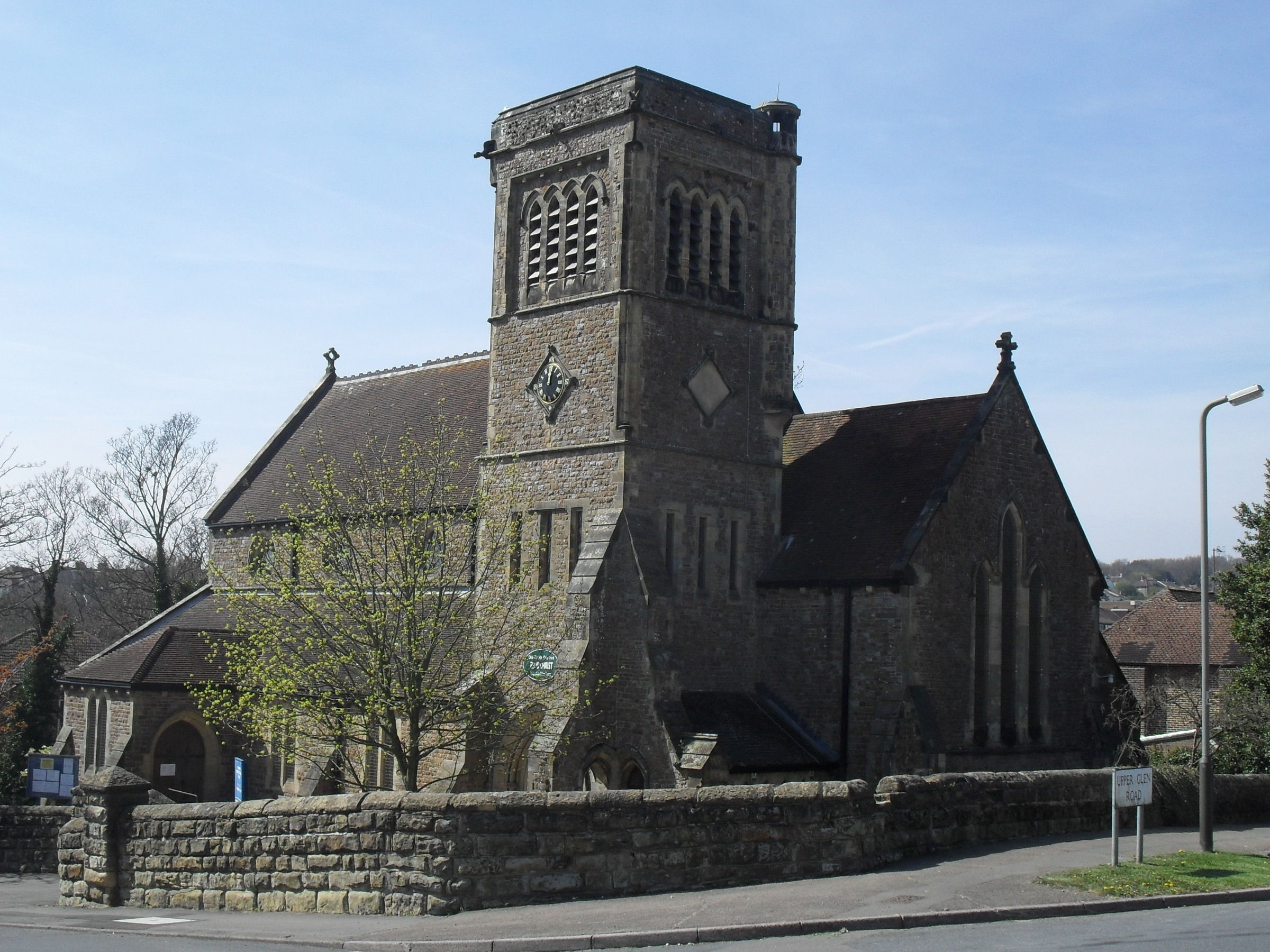
St John the Evangelist church, Hollington, designed by E.A. Wyon and engineered by Howell senior in 1865−1868

He also constructed the town’s main drainage works between 1866 and the summer of 1868, for a fee of £25,640. Work started on 12 October 1866. The system ran "from St Leonards Archway via the Priory (near the Memorial) to a large arched tank at Rock-a-Nore holding one and a half million gallons, then to the mouth of an iron outlet pipe off Ecclesbourne Glen". People could now experience "clean bathing in a pure sea": this may explain the necessity for the new drainage system. The work involved embedding planks up to four feet deep into rock. He was the builder of St Johns Church, Hollington, from 1865 to 1868, for architect Edward Alexander Wyon (1842–1872). St John's Church is not listed. Howell was the engineer for the new Council building to the design of Mr Smith; this could be George Smith who lived at Copthorne. The building was opened in 1868 and stood on the corner of Bank Buildings and Middle Street; now the corner of Middle Street and Station Road. St Andrews Church, Queens Road, was begun in November 1869 and completed to the design of Matthew Edward Habershon; Howell's fee was £3,235. It held a congregation of 2,000 and survived until 1970 when it was declared unsafe and demolished.

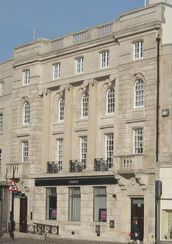
London and County Bank (now Nat West Bank)

He bid unsuccessfully for the job of constructing Hastings Pier in 1869 to 1872. However he did win a major contract for the large-scale development of the Cornwallis Estate in 1873. That job included Cambridge Gardens, Cornwallis Gardens and Holmesdale Gardens; March 1873 saw him already laying out Cambridge Gardens on the site of Priory farmyard, and demonstrating his local influence regarding the positioning of adjacent developments. Howell Senior eventually took up residence on the estate at number seven Holmesdale Gardens and called it Priory Mount. It is now the Westwood Centre. Emmanuel Church, Priory Road (now Vicarage Road), was built to the design of Jeffrey & Skiller in 1873. His fee for this job was paid by a local benefactor, Mrs Mendham, who also laid a memorial stone there. In 1875, he engineered a roller skating rink, later called the Cambridge Hall, on the east side of Cambridge Gardens; the site now contains the ESK Warehouse. It was a "large, iron-framed shed with wood panels", 120 ft by 60 ft by 27 ft high, and was opened on 1 February 1875. It was built to the design of "Mr Plumpton of New York" (possibly James Leonard Plimpton) who had designed the skates which would be hired and sold there.

His undated buildings include the London and County Bank which is now the National Westminster Bank. He built the St Mary Magdalen Schools; these are as yet unidentified, but one of them may be the listed Training College, Former Convent of the Holy Child Jesus, Hastings, which was designed by William Wardell. They may alternatively be schools built with funds from the Magdalen charity, including Hastings Grammar School. He built the Memorial Chapel which was in Bank Buildings and is now on the west side of Station Road, and numerous domestic buildings. He is credited with the undated construction of The Hastings and East Sussex Liberal Club building at 4 Pelham Street, Hastings; this is now part of Lloyds Bank in Wellington Place. It was owned by a company, and the Liberals occupied it until it was sold to a judge for £1,700 in 1894.

== Buildings by both partners ==
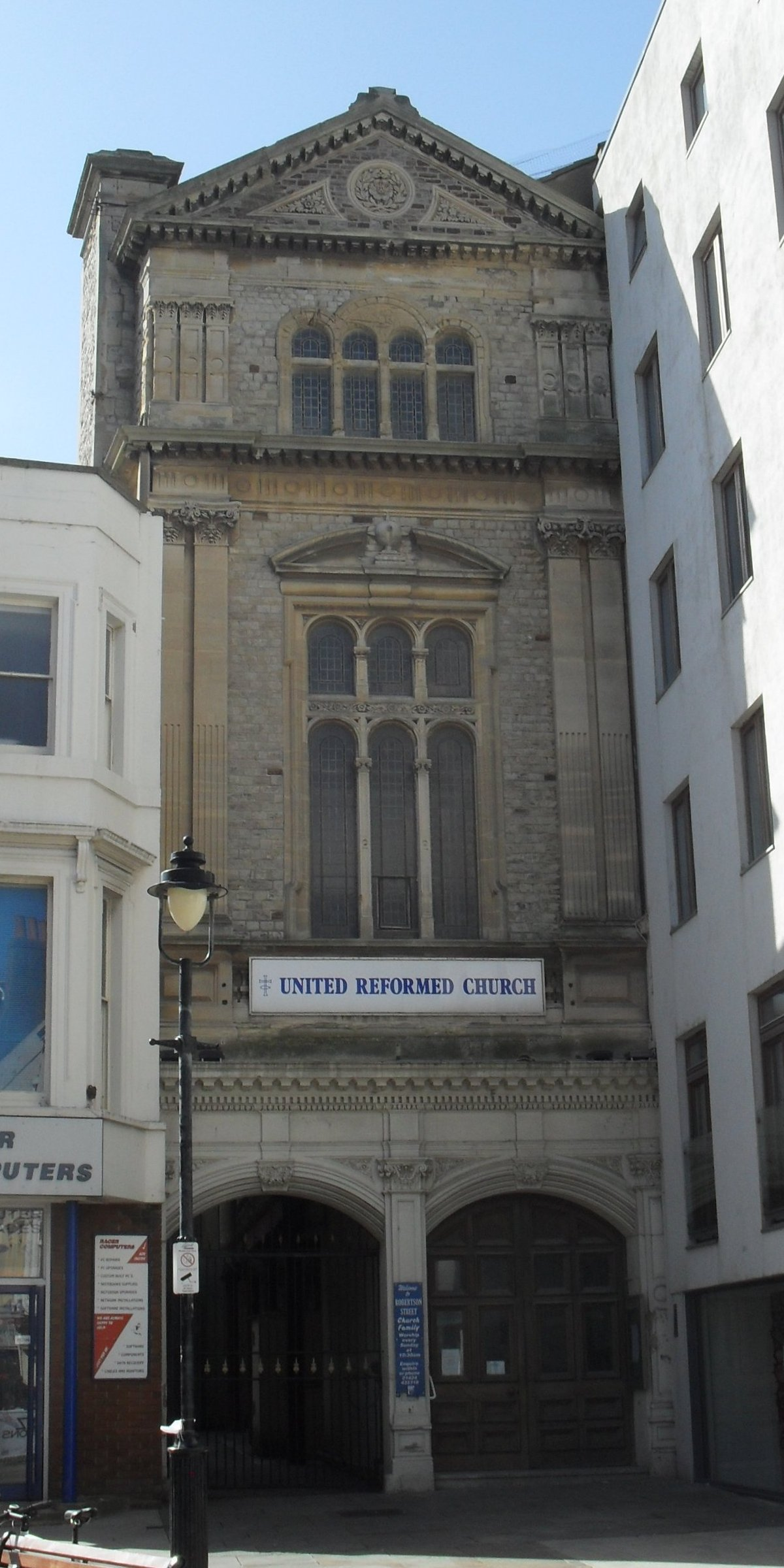
Robertson Street Congregational Church, built by both partners, 1884-1885

John Howell Senior's last work built in cooperation with his son was Robertson Street Congregational Church, Hastings, to the design of Henry Ward (1854−1927). It was built mainly in 1884 to 1885 but completed in the 1890s. It is now a United Reformed Church.

== John Howell Junior ==
=== Personal history ===
John Howell Junior (born Hastings 1851; died Hastings 1903) was the son and business partner of John Howell Senior; he also practised as a solicitor. He and his wife Lilla had six children, all born at St Leonards: Cecil John (born around 1884); Gladys Lilian (b.ca.1886); Reginald Edward (b.ca.1887); Mabel E.O. (b.ca.1889; Herbert Edgar (b.ca.1890); Wilfred Douglas. (b.ca.1896).

By the time he was nineteen years old in 1871 he was living with his parents in Havelock Road and articled to an attorney. He became a partner in the firm sometime after 1873. By 1881 at age twenty-nine he was describing himself as a timber merchant like his father, and living with his parents at Priory Mount in Cambridge Gardens, Hastings. He continued under the same company name after his father retired in 1882 and the original firm was dissolved. He married Mrs Lilla Harford (b. Barnstaple ca.1856; d. Wandsworth 1930) of Cambridge Gardens, Hastings on 7 June 1882, when his employees received a half-day holiday, an afternoon of entertainment at Field's Farm, Ore and an evening dinner at the Grand Hotel in Queens Road, Hastings. Around a hundred of the men took advantage of this. By 1991 the family was living at Rothesay, Clive Road, Hastings, with five of their children: Cecil, Gladys, Reginald, Mabel and Herbert. They had seven servants living in: a housekeeper, parlourmaid, cook, housemaid, under-nurse, coachman and gardener. The 1901 Census finds John Howell Junior as a solicitor still living with his wife, his stepson Hugh Cardinal Harford (b. Middlesex ca.1877) and five of their children at Rothesay. His eldest son Cecil was at that time a commercial clerk living at a boarding house in Rochester, Kent. John Howell Junior died aged 52 years on 13 December 1903 in his home at 20 Holmesdale Gardens which he had built with his father soon after joining the firm. He left £53,352 in his will.

The 1911 Census saw Lilla Howell as a widow, living at Preston House, Dulwich Road, Herne Hill, with five of her seven children. Hugh was an insurance inspector; Gladys was a costumier, Reginald was a Lloyds shipping agent, Herbert was a flour merchant and Wilfred was a college student. Cecil John spent some time in India as a merchant, and 1925 saw him returning home on the SS Warwickshire with his five-year-old son Peter John Howell; they were then living at 27 Pinfold Road, Streatham Hill, London. There is therefore no evidence yet found that John Howell & Son continued as a building or engineering firm after the death of John Howell Junior in 1903.

=== Works ===
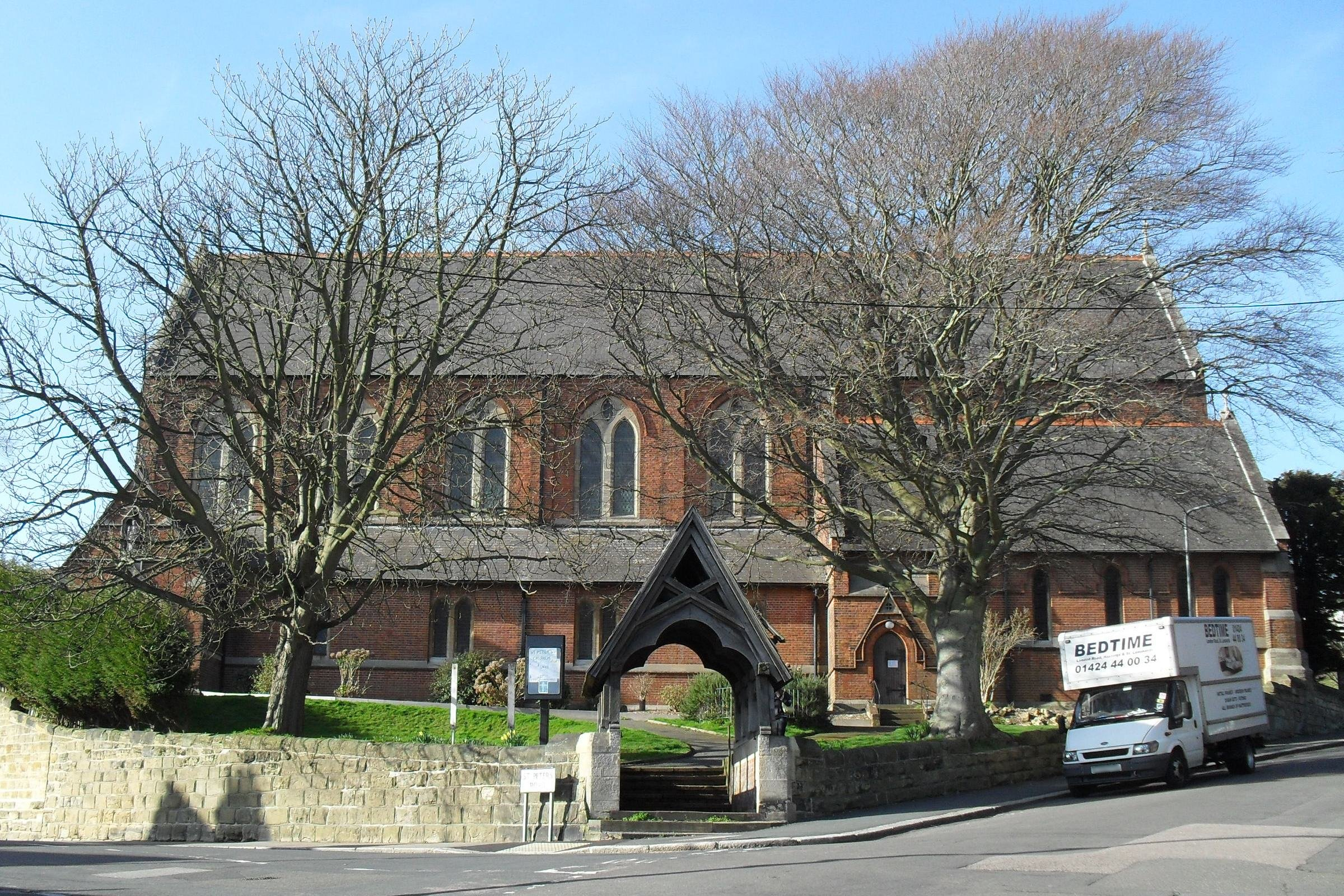
St Peter's Church, designed by James Brooks and built by John Howell Jnr, 1883−1885

John Howell Junior was the engineer of the previous Gothic Revival building for Hastings Grammar School (pictured above), designed by Jeffery and Skiller of Havelock Road, Hastings. The foundation stone was laid on 15 September 1882, and the first section was opened on 4 July 1883. It was built on a slope using Kentish ragstone and Bath Stone dressings, and shortage of funds meant that it had to be built in stages. In the first stage the building contained a large schoolroom with "a raised platform at one end and a gallery at the other; four adjoining classrooms; above, space not yet used as part of the second section; below, a covered playground". The second stage, which was never built, was to include accommodation for thirty boarders and a master. The planned capacity was for up to 140 boys, and cost around £10,000. The school ultimately had an eighty-foot tower. Hastings Grammar School moved to a new building on another.much larger, site in 1964 and is now the William Parker Sports College. The 1883 building was demolished in 1973 and the site is now occupied by housing, the road names all being connected to the school. He built St Peter's Church, Lower Park Road, to the design of James Brooks (1825–1901). The foundation stone was laid in 1883, and it was completed in 1885.

== List of works in Hastings area ==
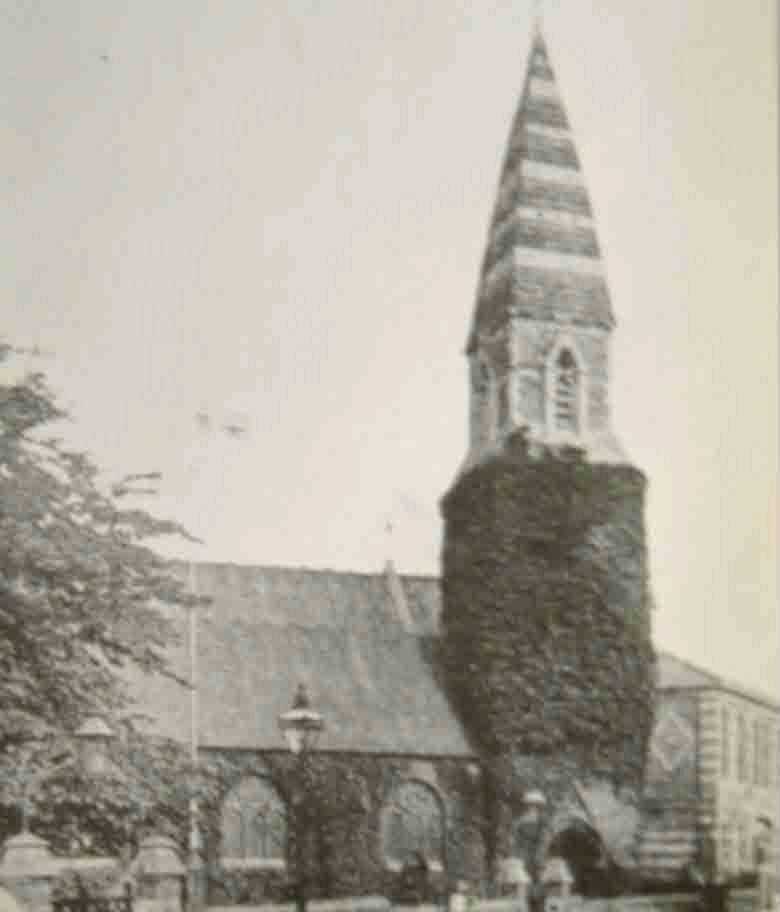
St Andrews Church, Queen Street, 1869

=== Churches ===
- Holy Trinity Church, Robertson Street (1860−1862; architect Samuel Sanders Teulon)
- St Johns Church, Hollington (1865−1868; architect Edward Alexander Wyon)
- St Andrews Church, Queens Road (1869; architect Matthew Edward Habershon) Demolished
- Emmanuel Church, Priory Road – now Vicarage Road (1873; architects Jeffrey & Skiller)
- Memorial Chapel (Baptist), Bank Buildings (west side of Station Road) (1864; architect Thomas Elworthy)
- Robertson Street Congregational Church, now United Reformed Church (1884−1885, completed 1890s; architect Henry Ward)
- St Peters Church, Lower Park Road (1883−1885; architect James Brooks)

=== Public works ===
Assembly Rooms, 1858

- Stables for the Local Board in Waterworks Road, (before 1851; possibly self-designed)
- Music Hall, Central Assembly Room or Public Hall now in Cambridge Road (1858; architect unknown)
- Hastings' main drainage works (1866−1868; engineer unknown)
- Council offices, corner of Middle Street and Station Road (1868; architect possibly George Smith)
- Roller skating rink or Cambridge Hall, in Cambridge Gardens, on current ESK Warehouse site (1875; architect possibly James Leonard Plimpton) Demolished
- Mary Magdalen schools, possibly built with funds from the Magdalen charity (undated; architect unknown)
- Hastings and East Sussex Liberal Club, 4 Pelham Street, now part of Lloyds Bank in Wellington Place.
- Hastings Grammar School (1882−1883; architects Jeffery & Skiller) Demolished 1965−1966

=== Domestic and commercial buildings ===
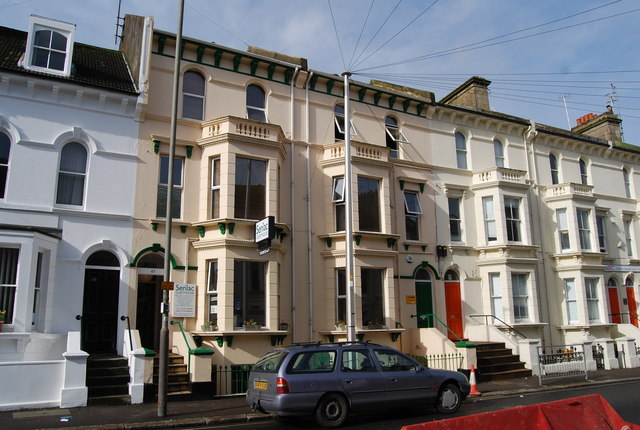
Cambridge Gardens, built by John Howell & Son, 1873

- West side of Warrior Square (completed 1855; architect unknown)
- Basement of the Queens Hotel (1862; architect unknown)
- Cornwallis Estate including Cambridge Gardens, Cornwallis Gardens and Holmesdale Gardens (1873; architect unknown)
- - Priory Mount, 7 Holmesdale Gardens, now the Westwood Centre, was occupied by John Howell Senior from at least 1881 to 1893.
- - 20 Holmesdale Gardens was occupied by John Howell Junior in 1902−1903.
- London and County Bank, now the National Westminster Bank (undated; architect unknown)
- Numerous domestic buildings (details unknown)
