= 9 and 11 Duke Street =

Houses in Westminster, London, England

Coordinates: 51.5161°N 0.1521°W

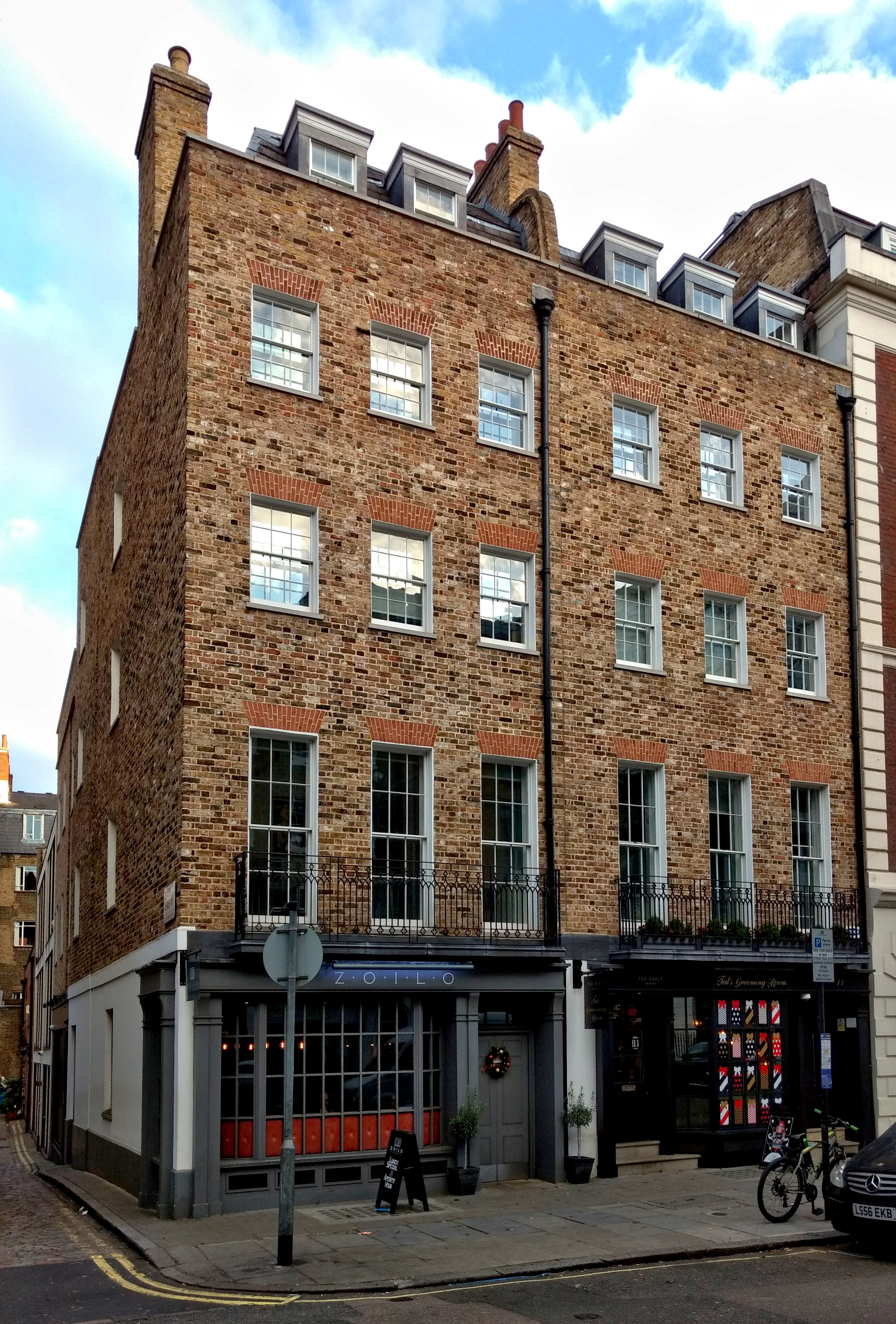
9 and 11 Duke Street

9 and 11 Duke Street are grade II listed terraced townhouses in Duke Street, Marylebone, in the City of Westminster, London. The houses are on the east side of the street on the corner with Duke's Mews. They were built around 1776–1788 when the Duke of Manchester developed Manchester Square on Portman Estate land. Built of stock brick with slate roofs, they later had shop fronts added which were altered in the Victorian period. The buildings were extensively renovated in 2011–12 by Richardsons (Nyewood) Limited.
