= Beaumont Hotel, London =

Hotel in Mayfair, London

Coordinates: 51.5129°N 0.1524°W

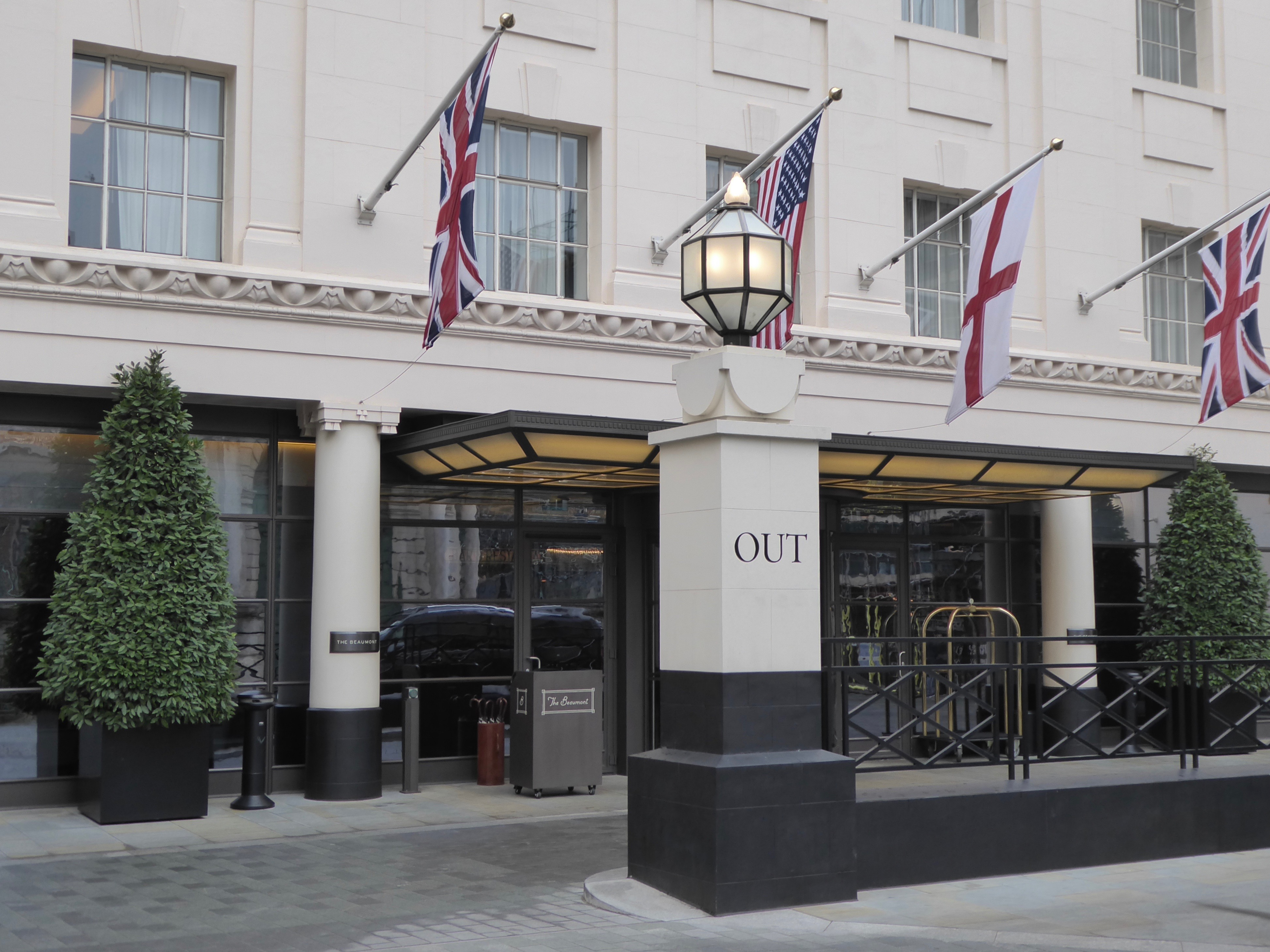
The hotel's entrance in Balderton Street

The Beaumont Hotel is a Grade II listed luxury hotel in Mayfair, London, United Kingdom. One of its rooms was designed by Antony Gormley as a public sculpture.

== Location ==
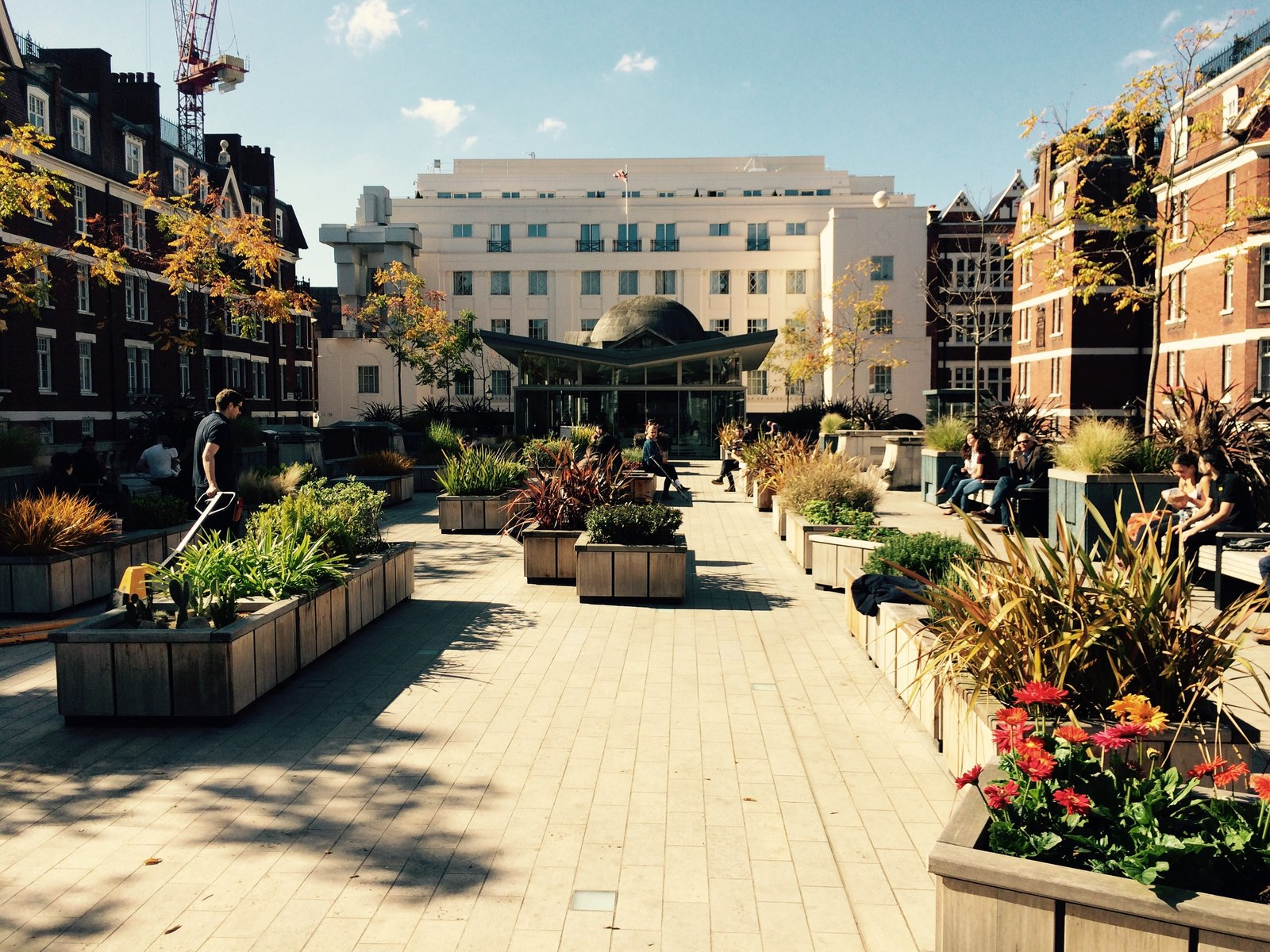
Beaumont Hotel seen from Brown Hart Gardens, in 2015

The hotel is located at 8 Balderton Street, Mayfair, near Brown Hart Gardens. It has 73 rooms, including 23 studios and suites, and opened in September 2014.

== History ==
The building was erected as a multistorey car park in 1925–1926 to designs by the architects Wimperis and Simpson on behalf of Macy's Ltd.

Historic England note that "the façade is remarkably ambitious for a car park of this date", as well as "its importance in the evolution of the multi-storey car park as a distinctive C20 building type".

The building was listed Grade II on the National Heritage List for England by Historic England in 2009.

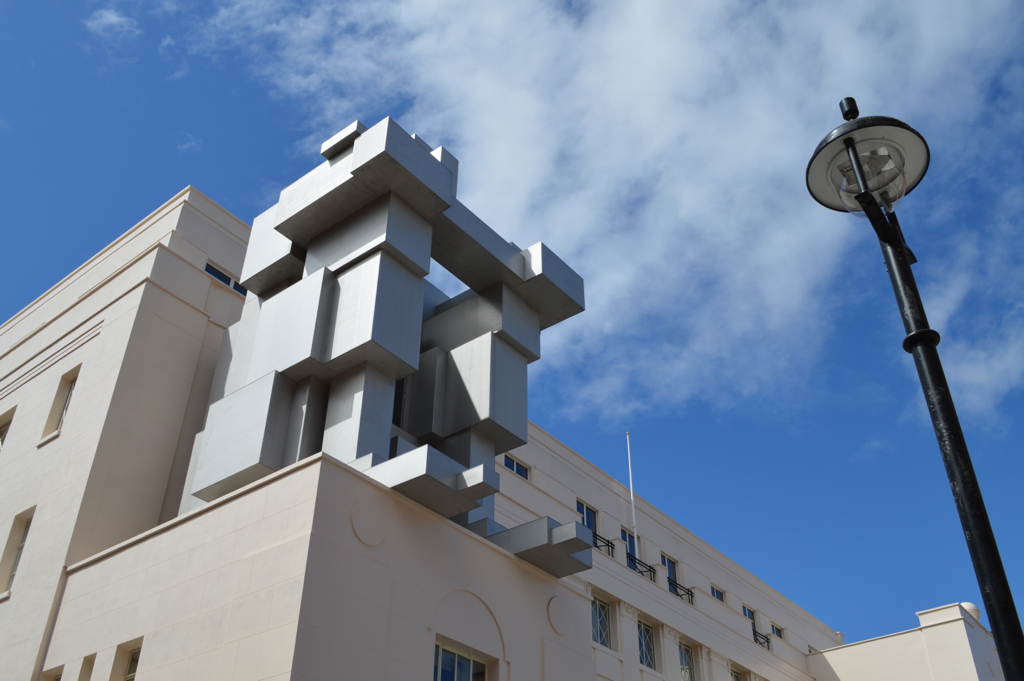
Antony Gormley's hotel room

In 2014 Antony Gormley designed a room as a public sculpture.
