= Brown Hart Gardens =

Public garden in Mayfair, London

Coordinates: 51.5131°N 0.1516°W

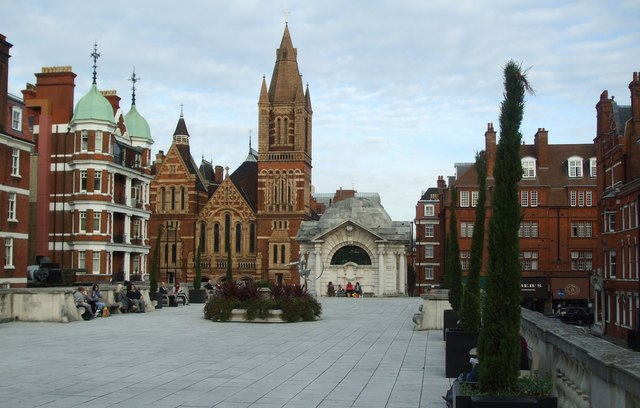
Deck of the garden looking east

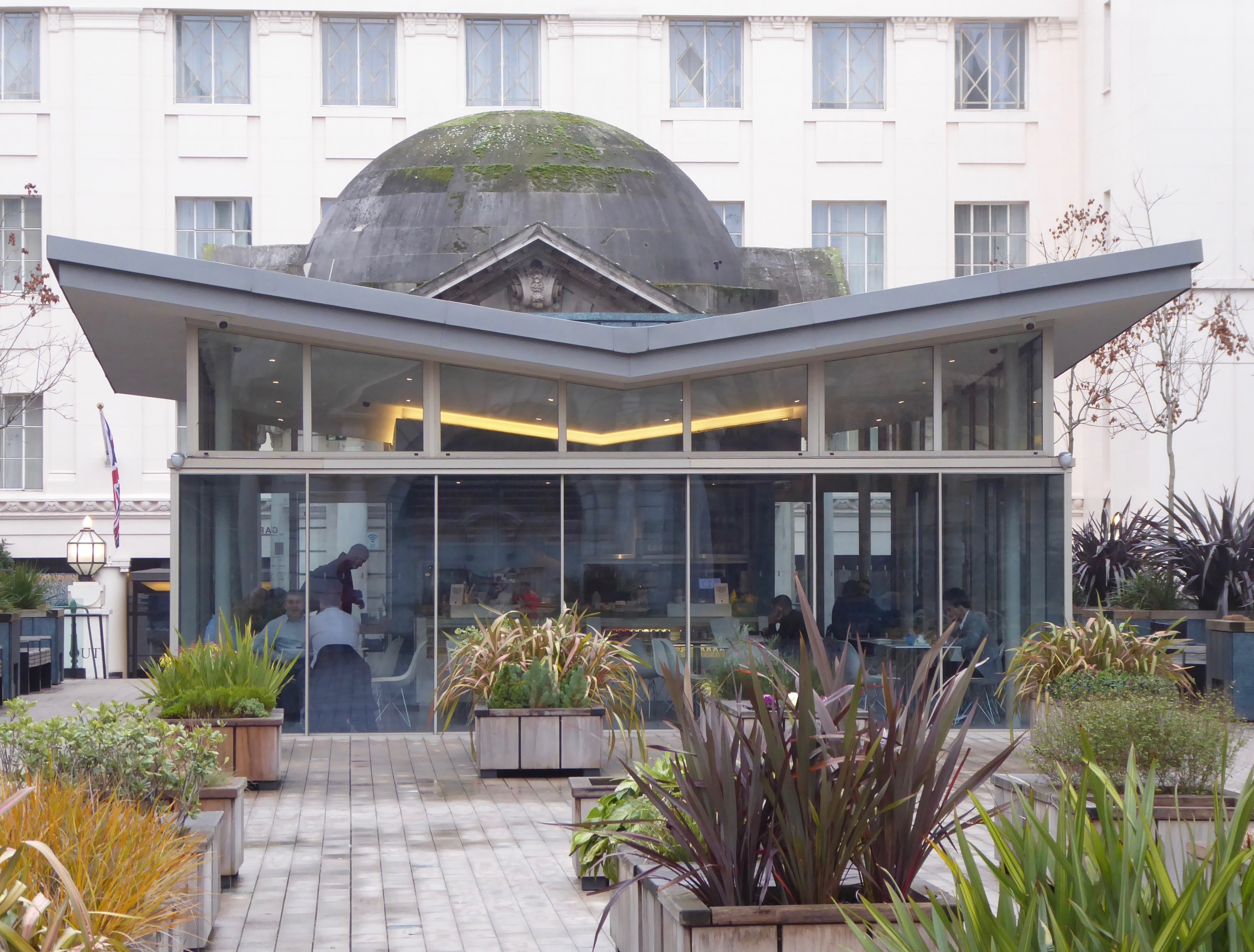
The glass building at the Western end which houses a café

Brown Hart Gardens, located off Duke Street, Mayfair, is a 10,000 square feet (929 m^{2}) public garden on top of an electricity substation.

== History ==
The gardens began life as the Duke Street Gardens where a communal garden was laid for what were then working class dwellings in Brown Street and Hart Street.

In 1902, the building of the Duke Street Electricity Substation led to the removal of the street level gardens. The substation was completed in 1905 to the design of Charles Stanley Peach in a Baroque style from Portland stone featuring a mannerist domed pavilion and steps at either end, a balustrade and Diocletian windows along the sides to light the galleries of the engine rooms, and deep basements. In order to compensate local residents for the loss of the old communal garden, the Duke of Westminster insisted that a paved Italian garden featuring trees in tubs be placed on top of the substation. It was completed in 1906. The deck of the property was open to the public as an ornamental garden until the 1980s when it was closed by the then lessees, the London Electricity Board.

The dwellings surrounding Brown Hart Gardens were built by The Improved Industrial Dwellings Company (founded in 1863) to replace the poor housing that existed previously. In 1888 Moore suggested that tenants of old houses should move into Clarendon Buildings and that inmates of Clarendon Buildings should go into the new blocks, so that 'those who had not been used to a model lodging house would be gradually improved before moving into new buildings'. This was approved, but it cannot have been generally done. Though no figures are available, the rents for those displaced and rehoused were fixed below market value and indeed below what they had paid before, while for newcomers the terms were higher. This was only possible because of the low grounds rents charged by the Duke on all the buildings on both sides of Duke Street, amounting to £502 per annum as against £2,193 for old leases of the same sites. Altogether 332 families were accommodated in the developments of 1886–92.

Together with Clarendon Buildings, this meant that the Duke and the I.I.D.C. had between them settled nearly 2,000 people on the Grosvenor estate in Mayfair.

Since 1973 the blocks have been taken over by the Peabody Trust, and their names changed from 'Buildings' to 'Flats'.

In 2007 plans were announced to revamp the site, and the site was reopened to the public after 20 years of closure in October 2007. In 2012 the gardens were closed for further refurbishment, funded by Grosvenor Britain and Ireland, under supervision of BDP, the architectural consultancy. The new development includes a glass building at the Western end, housing The Garden Café, run by Benugo. The gardens were reopened to the public in June 2013, complete with over sixty bespoke seating and planter products.

The adjacent Beaumont Hotel (formerly an Avis garage) was opened in autumn 2014, after a £21 million development by Grosvenor, in partnership with Corbin & King Hotels, who operate the hotel.
