= Jean Goguel =

French geologist

Jean Goguel (2 January 1908 – 5 January 1987) was a French geologist and geophysicist. He was an Honorary Fellow of the Geological Societies of America, of London, and of Belgium. He played an important leadership role in the International Union of Geodesy and Geophysics and he was made chairman of the European Association of Exploration Geophysicists in 1952

== Family ==
Jean Marc Henri Victor Goguel is the son of Maurice Goguel, professor at the Sorbonne and dean of the Protestant theological faculty of Paris, and the brother of François Goguel and Elisabeth Labrousse, philosopher and historian. The family comes from a long line within the French Protestant tradition.

== Diplomas and titles ==
In 1926, he graduated the Polytechnique. He became an engineer at the Corps des Mines in 1931, a chief engineer in 1942, and a general engineer in 1959. He earned a doctor of science in 1937.

== Awards and honors ==
- Officier de la légion d'honneur (1959).
- Commandeur de l'ordre national du mérite (1976).
- Prix James Hall de l'Académie des Sciences (1938).
- Prix Cuvier de l'Académie des Sciences (1948).
- Prix Prestwich de la Société géologique de France (1957).
- Première médaille Vermeil du BRGM (1977).
- Prix Gaudry de la Société géologique de France (1978).
- Grand prix scientifique de la Ville de Paris (1979).
- Médaille d'Or de la Société d'encouragement à l'industrie nationale (1979).
- Prix Alexandre Joannidès de l'Académie des Sciences(1980).
- Médaille d'Or Fourmarier de l'Académie Royale de Belgique (1984).

== Books ==
- L'Homme dans l'univers, éditions Corréa, 1947.

== Bibliography ==
- Catherine Storne, "Goguel, Jean", in Patrick Cabanel and André Encrevé (ed.), Biographical Dictionary of French Protestants from 1787 to the present day, volume 2: DG, Les Éditions de Paris Max Chaleil, Paris, 2020, p. 861-862 ( ISBN 978-2-84621-288-5 )
