= Elisabeth Labrousse =

French philosopher, historian and academic

Elisabeth Labrousse (French: [labʁus]; born Elisabeth Goguel; 10 January 1914 – 1 February 2000) was a French philosopher, historian, and academic. She became known for her work on Pierre Bayle and the history of French Protestantism.

== Early life and education ==
Elisabeth Goguel was born in Paris on 10 January 1914. She was the daughter of Maurice Goguel, a specialist in early Christianity and professor at the Protestant Faculty of Theology in Paris, director of studies at the École pratique des hautes études, and Professor at the Sorbonne. Her siblings included François Goguel, French constitutional expert, and Jean Goguel, geologist.

Labrousse defended her thesis in 1963, under the direction of Henri Gouhier.

== Career ==
Labrousse began her career at the National University of Tucumán in Argentina, where she taught history of modern philosophy from 1947 to 1955. A 1952 scholarship winner of Maison Descartes in Amsterdam, she initiated the critical inventory of Bayle's correspondence. She joined the Centre national de la recherche scientifique (CNRS) in 1955 and continued her university career there until 1979. From 1966 till 1979, she was a lecturer at the 4th section of the École pratique des hautes études.

She died in Nice on 1 February 2000. Following her death, an appraisal of her work by comparison with Bayle's was published by the Huguenot Society.

== Distinctions ==
- 1973, Doctorat honoris causa, Institut protestant de théologie - faculté de théologie protestante de Paris
- 1982, Doctorat honoris causa, University of Geneva
- 1986, Doctorat honoris causa, University of Oxford
- 2000, Doctorat honoris causa, Leiden University
- Fellow, St Hilda's College, Oxford
- Honorary fellow, American Historical Association

== Selected works ==
- Critical inventory of the correspondence of Pierre Bayle, Paris, Vrin, 1961.
- Pierre Bayle - I. From the country of Foix to the city of Erasmus; II. Heterodoxism and rigorism, The Hague, Nijhoff, 1963-1964 (Volume II, reissued: Paris, Albin Michel, 1996).
- Pierre Bayle and the critical instrument, Presentation, choice of texts, bibliography by E. Labrousse, Paris, Seghers, 1965.
- Henri Basnage de Beauval, Tolerance of Religions, London / New York, 1970. (editor and introduction)
- Pierre Bayle, What is France all Catholic under Louis the Great, edited by E. Labrousse with the collaboration of H. Himmelfarb and Roger Zuber, Paris, Vrin, 1973. (editor)
- Saturn's Entrance to Leo (The Sun's eclipse of August 12, 1654), The Hague, Nijhoff, 1974.
- The Massacre of St. Bartholomew, or the resonances of a massacre, Neuchâtel 1976. (in collaboration with Philippe Joutard, Janine Estèbe and J. Lecuir)
- Pierre Bayle, Miscellaneous Works, edited by and preface by E. Labrousse, Hildesheim and New York, Georg Olms, 1982.
- A faith, a law, a king? The Revocation of the Edict of Nantes, Paris, Payot / Geneva, Labor and Fides, 1985.
- Warning to the Protestants of the Provinces (1684), text presented by E. Labrousse, in Studies of Religious History and Philosophy, No. 67, Paris, PUF, 1986. (editor)
- Notes on Bayle, Paris, Vrin, 1987.
- Pierre Bayle's Correspondence, Oxford, The Voltaire Foundation, 1999. (editor)
