= Charles Stanley Peach =

British architect (1858–1934)

Charles Stanley Peach (1858–1934) was a British architect who designed Baroque and early modern architecture. He designed many buildings across the United Kingdom, including the Central Cold Storage in Smithfield Market, Grove Road Power Station, Brown Hart Gardens in London, and notably the Centre Court at Wimbledon. Peach was described as a "Pioneer in power" and was praised for his early work with electricity.

Peach trained in the office of Hugh Roumieu Gough as a young man, where he learnt the basics of architecture. He commenced independent practice at Carlton Chambers, Regent Street, London, in 1884, moving to Warwick Square, south-west London, in 1921. He developed an extensive practice, working with organisations such as the Waifs and Strays Society, and continued working until his death.

== Early life ==
Charles Stanley Peach was born at sea in 1858, while his parents, Robert Atkyns Peach and Penelope Eliza Warden, were returning from India. Charles had four brothers and four sisters, one of whom, Alfred C. Peach (1865), lived with Charles, his wife and children for a few years after Charles had established his architectural firm. In 1889, Peach married Charlotte Justina Newton at Putney. They had two daughters, Ermyntrude Stanley Peach (1894) and Justina Rose Peach (1892). Charles and Charlotte also had a son, Cruger Stanley Peach (1896). Cruger was a Lieutenant in the army during the First World War, but died aged 20 following a flight training accident. Justina was married, but none of the children went on to have children of their own.

== Career ==
Peach originally studied medicine but left after a year to pursue opportunities in America before it had been fully developed. After a riding accident, Peach returned home to England, where he spent two years in the office of architect Hugh Roumieu Gough.

After these two years, Peach began his own practice in 1884. The beginning of his practice coincided with the development of public electricity supply in the UK. Peach was in close contact with many of the leading electricians in the UK at this time and soon became a preferred architect for numerous companies establishing electrical supply infrastructure around the country. This was a particularly challenging area at the time, as this type of architecture was relatively new, meaning that new solutions had to be developed rather than simply drawing upon existing architectural traditions.

Charles worked closely with Charles Herbert Reilly on some of these projects. Reilly described him as "a good constructor, but diffident about his own powers of design". Reilly also criticised Peach for attempting to add too much architectural decoration to his engineering buildings, which he felt would have been better left more simply designed. Others, such as Grosvenor, described Peach's work at Brown Hart Gardens as a "rejuvenated oasis".

During Peach's career as an architect, he trained many others as assistants. These included Charles Ogilvie Campbell, Sir Charles Herbert Reilly, John Mackenzie and Stanley Churchill Ramsey.

== Style ==
Peach's work drew heavily upon the Baroque architecture common in the UK at the time. He was influenced by architects such as George Basevi and drew inspiration from the structural features of temples and churches. Peach spent a year studying temples in Jerusalem and was particularly interested in the relationship between religion and architecture. He was also closely connected to the Church, having undertaken extensive design work for the Waifs and Strays Society.

Much of Peach's work includes features that were becoming less common at the time, with more classical designs appearing alongside the growing simplicity of the period. These included the use of pillars and domes, as can be seen in structures such as Brown Hart Gardens. Peach also focused on stately arches and doorways in many of his buildings, as can be seen in several of his buildings for the Waifs and Strays Society, as well as Brown Hart Gardens.

Peach was also ahead of his time in some aspects of his work. At the time of its construction, the Centre Court at Wimbledon was the largest whole-concrete structure created. This further contributed to Peach's reputation and significance as an architect.

Although many of his buildings date back many years, the vast majority are still in use today. Brown Hart Gardens remains accessible, while many of his London works continue to be repurposed and occupied.

== Works ==
- Brown Hart Gardens, London
- Centre Court at Wimbledon
- Highball, Hanley Swan
- Central Cold Storage, Smithfield Market, London
- Grove Road Power Station, London
- Preston Manor, Brighton
- WHSmith offices, 127 Stamford Street, London
- Theatre Royal Auditorium, Haymarket
- Stations for the municipality of Kilmarnock
- Electricity Generating Station, Kirkcaldy
- Tramway offices, Kilmarnock
