= Guy Alfred Wyon =

English researcher

Dr Guy Alfred Wyon MD, BSc
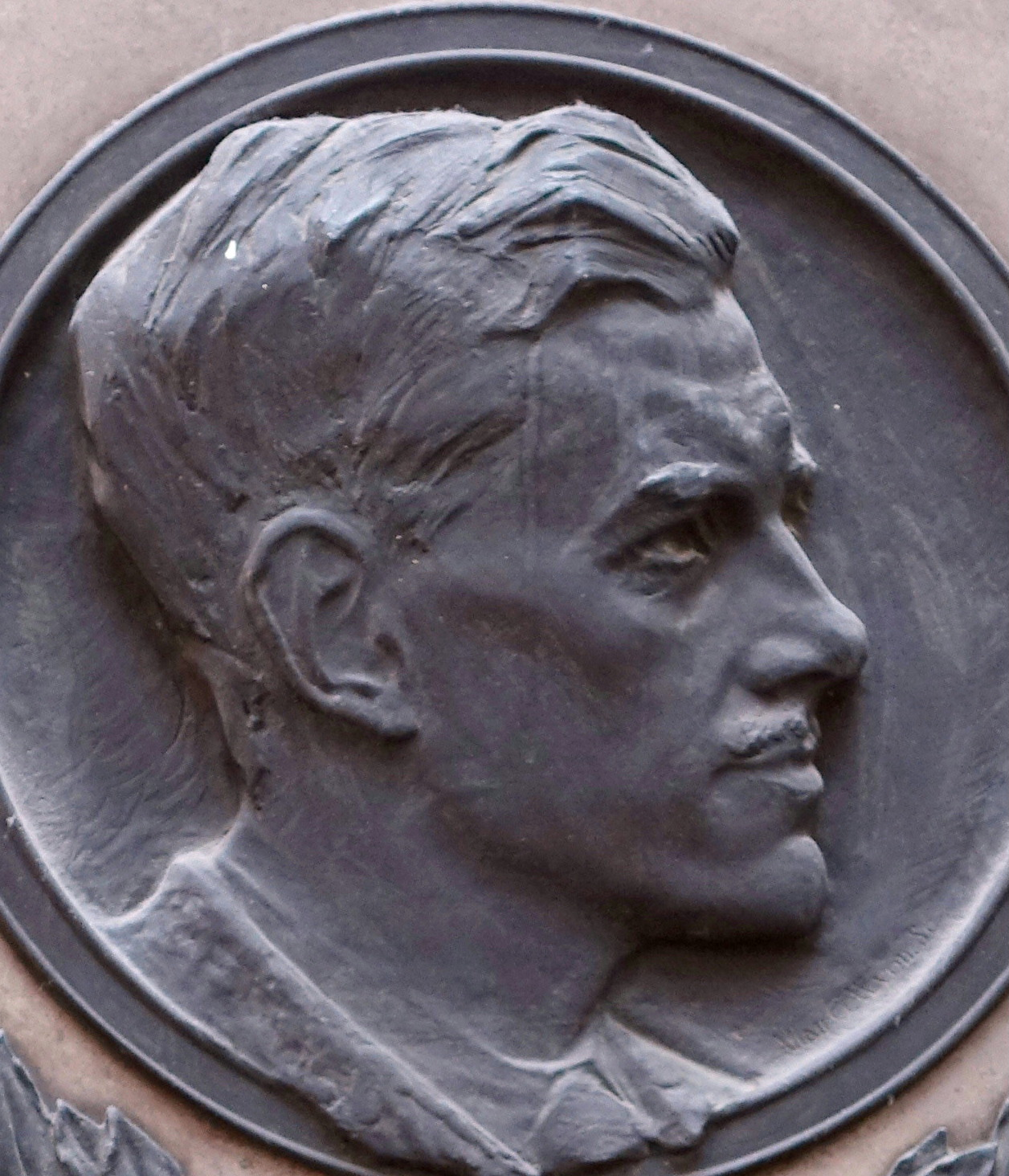
- Guy Alfred Wyon, 1924, by his brother Allan G. Wyon
- Born: 15 October 1883; Hampstead, London
- Died: 2 March 1924 (aged 40); Leeds, West Riding of Yorkshire, England
- Years active: c.1904–1924
- Known for: Discovery of the mode of entry of, and remedy for, TNT poisoning (with Benjamin Moore)
- Relatives: Wyon family
- Medical career
- Profession: Medical doctor, researcher and lecturer
- Field: Pathology
- Institutions: Ipswich Hospital; Medical Research Council; Leeds University; Old Leeds School of Medicine
- Research: Chemistry of bacterial growth

Guy Alfred Wyon (15 October 1883 – 2 March 1924) MD, BSc. was an English pathologist, researcher and lecturer, focusing mainly on bacterial growth and producing papers on the subject.

Before the First World War, he was a house physician and surgeon. During the war, he was seconded to the Medical Research Council and took an active part in the three-man team which discovered the mode of entry of potentially-lethal TNT poisoning into the human system in British shell factories, and used that knowledge to implement a method of prevention of further deaths. In 1917 he served in a Casualty Clearing Station in France, and following the Armistice he was in control of a mobile laboratory in the Meuse Valley. After the war he became a demonstrator and then a lecturer at Leeds University, England, while continuing research.

Wyon was related to the Wyon family of sculptors and engravers associated with the Royal Mint. He married organist Emma Mildred "Ruby" Hitchcock, the daughter of a miller, and they had three sons, of whom one was a medical missionary. Wyon died in Leeds at age 40 of influenza and pneumonia.

== Background ==
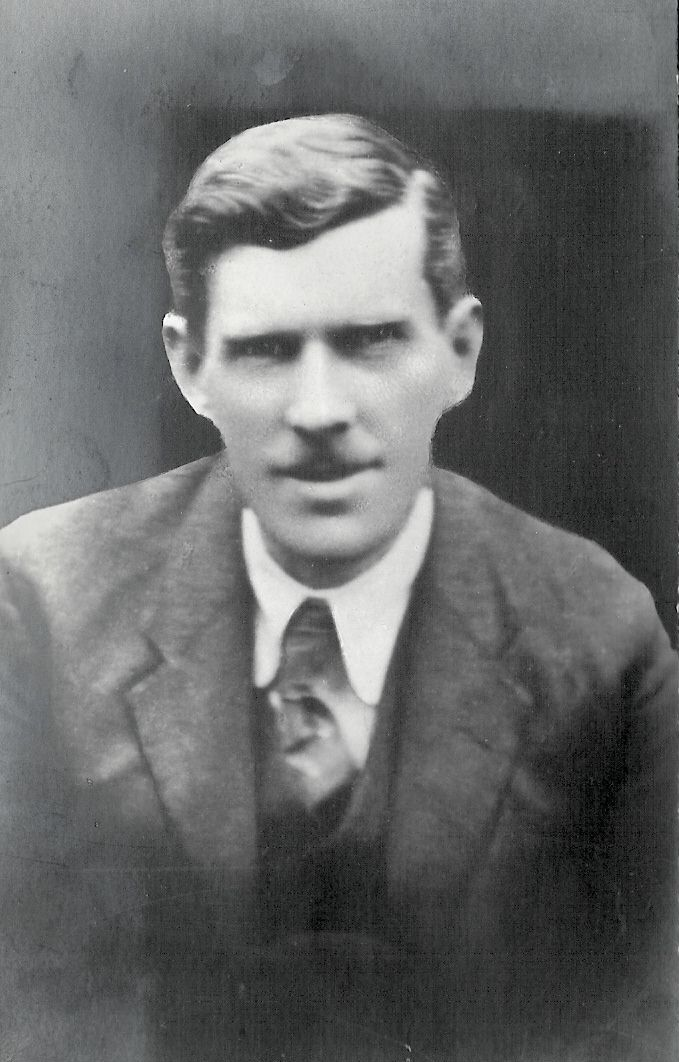
Guy Alfred Wyon

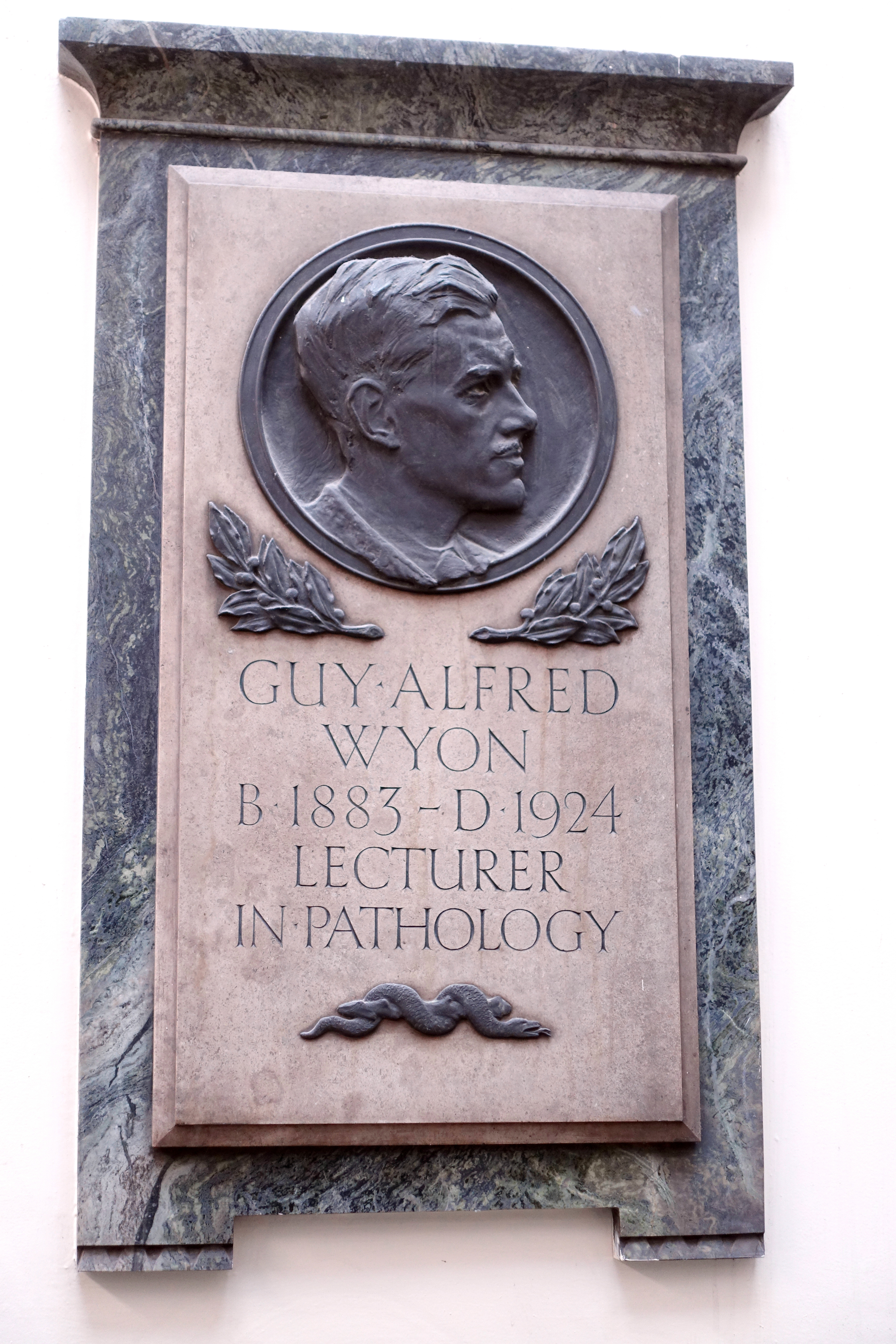
Wyon's 1924 memorial plaque by A.G. Wyon, at the old School of Medicine, Thoresby Place, Leeds

Guy Alfred Wyon (Hampstead 15 October 1883 – Leeds 2 March 1924) MD, BSc, (Note: GRO index: Births Dec 1883 WYON Guy Alfred Hampstead 1a 634) of 5 Spring Road, Headingley, West Yorkshire, England, was related to those members of the Wyon family of die-engravers and medallists who were associated with the Royal Mint. He was the younger son of the engraver Allan Wyon FSA (4 July 1843 – 25 January 1907) and Harriet "Hetty" Gairdner (1847–1936), and the brother of Allan Gairdner Wyon FRBS RMS (1882 – 26 February 1962), a die-engraver and sculptor.

On 18 July 1911 at the Free Church, Bures, Suffolk, Wyon married organist Emma Mildred "Ruby" Hitchcock (Sudbury 12 June 1879 – Thirsk 1973), (Note: GRO index: Births Sep 1879 Hitchcock Emma Mildred Sudbury 4a 510, Deaths Sep 1973 Wyon Emma Mildred 12 JE 1879 Thirsk 1B 2175) daughter of miller Cornelius Hitchcock (d.1933) (Note: GRO index: Deaths Jun 1933 Hitchcock Cornelius 81 Sudbury 4a 874) of Bures, Suffolk and organist Esther Fanny Hitchcock (d.1948), and sister of Dr John Hitchcock (d.1919), a medical missionary. Wyon and his wife were both nonconformists. They had three sons, of whom one was the medical missionary and writer John Benjamin Wyon (London 3 March 1918 – Maine 31 March 2004). The others were Dr Peter Hitchcock Wyon (1913–2007), a medical practitioner, and William Allan Wyon (1921 – Beirut 25 May 1945).

Wyon died on 2 March 1924 aged 40 years, at Leeds General Infirmary, of influenza (mistakenly described as "Spanish flu" in one newspaper) and pneumonia. The funeral took place on 5 March 1924 at Lawnswood Crematorium, where his ashes were scattered in the Cemetery Copse behind the chapel. Besides family and friends, mourners included Professor J.T. Jamieson, pro-vice chancellor of Leeds University, Professor M.J. Stewart, Professor McLeod, Professor Gilligan, a number of doctors, and nurses including Euphemia Steele Innes the matron of Leeds Infirmary. The Probate of 16 April 1924 states that he left £4,982 4s. 6d. (equivalent to £261,885 in 2025) gross to his widow.

=== Personality and interests ===
The Journal of Pathology and Bacteriology doubted that Wyon was interested in the arts, but said that, "he had a fine appreciation and joy in natural scenery, amounting in the case of the Lake District almost to a passion". At 6.5 ft (1.98 m) he was a tall man. He played lacrosse as a student, and was later a tennis player, when "his long reach stood him in good stead". "He played once for Middlesex second team against Gloucestershire, and had the satisfaction of scoring the winning goal just on the stroke of time". At Leeds University he belonged to a number of clubs including the Pathology Society and the Biochemical Society. Towards the end of his life he was taking an interest in clinical psychology.

=== Education and training ===
Wyon attended Highgate Grammar School. He gained his BSc degree in chemistry at the University of London (1904) and the University of Leeds, then his bachelor's degree in medicine (1910), and his MD with distinction (1915) at the University of Edinburgh Medical School where his thesis (completed in the London Hospital's clinical laboratory) was on the Abderhalden reaction.

== Career ==
=== Pre-war ===
Before the First World War, Wyon was a house physician and surgeon at East Suffolk and Ipswich Hospital, and a general practitioner in Bow, London.

=== First World War ===
Wyon served in Salonika with the Royal Army Medical Corps (RAMC), having joined up in April 1915 as a temporary lieutenant. Being seconded in May 1916 to the department of applied physiology of the Medical Research Council alongside Professor Benjamin Moore FRS and the pathologist T.A. Webster, Wyon was involved with the discovery of a remedy for TNT poisoning. They discovered the way in which the poison entered the body, then were able to provide a means of prevention. The Journal of Pathology and Bacteriology said of this research:

Into this work Wyon threw himself with characteristic ardour and enthusiasm. [A report] by Professor Moore shows clearly the important part which Wyon took in these researches. "Our joint labours," Moore wrote later, "resulted in a remarkable success, and this was due in no small measure to Wyon's energy and originality." By a long series of experiments, including many on their own persons, they were able to show the mode of entrance of the poison, and so to evolve satisfactory methods of protection.

The tragedy of First World War female factory employees of shell factories dying of TNT poisoning, plus the subsequent prevention and remedy discovered by Moore, Wyon and Webster, was censored by the War Office for the sake of public morale until October 1921, when Moore published an article on the subject in the British Medical Journal. This article shed some light on Wyon's working conditions:

I [Benjamin Moore] seem to remember that along with my colleagues Wyon and Webster, I went down to a munition factory in a county somewhere in England where girls were dying of T.N.T. poisoning. (T.N.T. was trinitroluol, our most forceful explosive), and that there we studied the subject for several weeks, that we rubbed the poisonous substance into our own skins and suffered from the poisonous effects, that we worked as operators in the factory and were assisted by many willing helpers. Finally we discovered that only a certain percentage of persons was acutely susceptible to the poison, and these were persons who readily let it through their skins. We tracked out how such susceptible persons could be detected and sent on to other work, and we reported accordingly. For weeks and months no action was taken, and we were prevented by the censorship from making our discoveries known, and deaths kept on occurring till there was almost a stampede of labour. In one factory alone illness due to T.N.T. was costing over £1,000 (equivalent to £88,880 in 2025) a week. It was only when I threatened to stump round the munition centres and explain to the workers upon T.N.T. what was at the root of the evil that executive action was taken, and within two or three weeks there was not another fatal case of T.N.T. poisoning throughout the whole country.

Following his Medical Research Council service, in 1917 Wyon joined a Casualty Clearing Station (13th CCS) in France. After the Armistice of 11 November 1918 he was in the Meuse Valley for a year, with responsibility for No. 19 mobile laboratory. When time allowed he would use laboratory facilities to pursue his own academic research.

=== Post-war ===
Wyon was described as a "distinguished scientist". He joined the department of pathology and bacteriology at the Leeds University as a demonstrator in December 1919. Until summer 1922 he was working in the bacteriology department, researching "nutritive requirements for bacterial growth, the reaction of culture media, and other problems of general bacteriology". His focus was the chemistry of bacterial growth, and several of his papers on the subject were published in medical journals.

In 1922 Wyon was promoted to a lectureship in pathology at Old Leeds School of Medicine, Thoresby Place, Leeds. That position included responsibility for the clinical laboratory in Leeds General Infirmary in Great George Street. "He addressed himself with special keenness to the chemical side of the work". When Wyon caught influenza, he was working on "the simplification and improvement of routine methods, the study of fundamental principles on which these were based, the establishment of normal standards". After he died, the Yorkshire Evening Post said, "Dr Wyon's work in Leeds has been most distinguished ... His colleagues deplore his loss most deeply".

The Journal of Pathology and Bacteriology said of him:

Tall ... and of striking aspect, Wyon was of a very quiet and retiring disposition. At home and among his colleagues his keen sense of humour, his good temper, kindliness and unusual gentleness of character endeared him to all. Personal advancement was about the last thing in his thoughts; indeed he may be said to have sacrificed much, in a material sense, in the pursuit of his own high ideals.

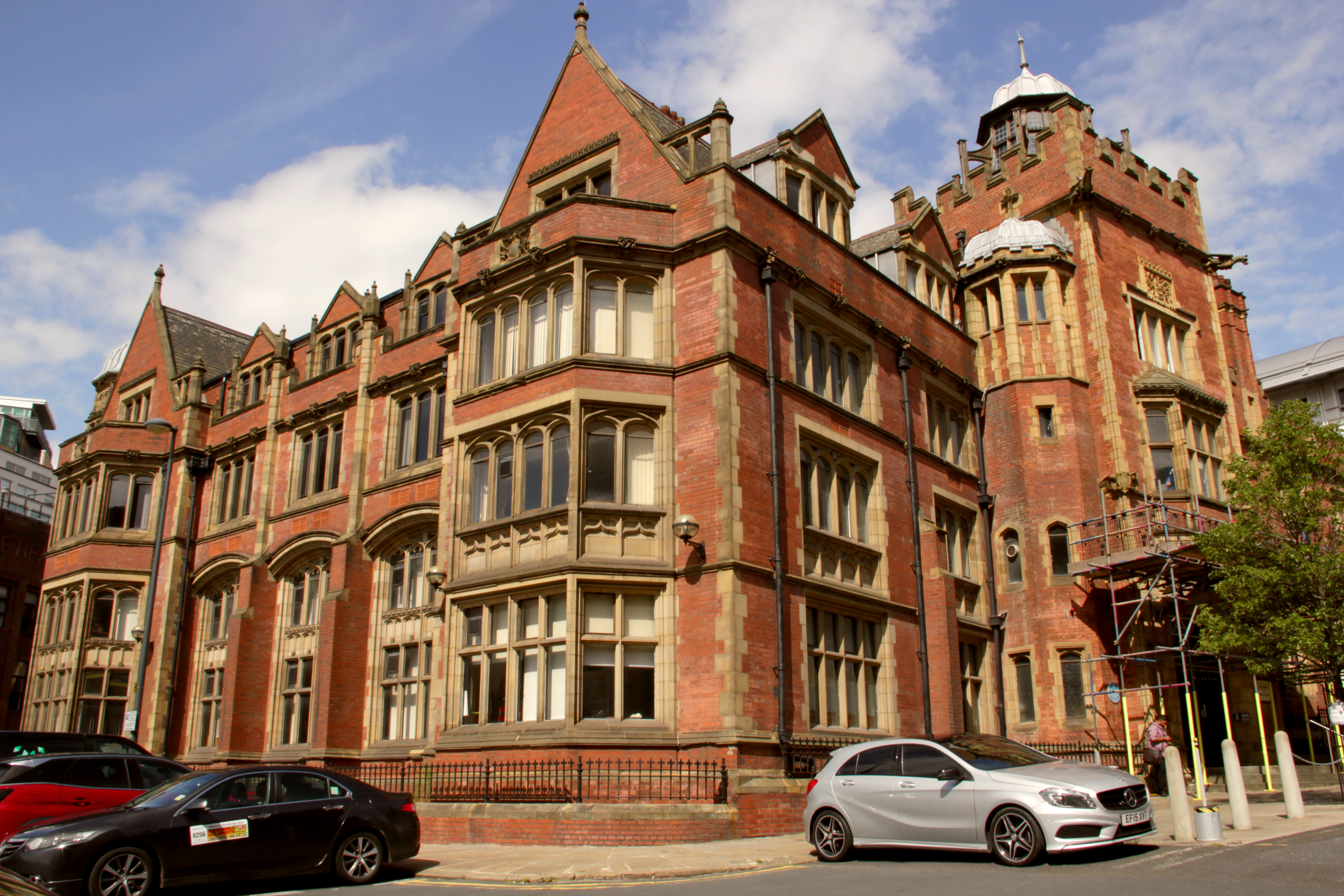
Leeds School of Medicine where Wyon worked

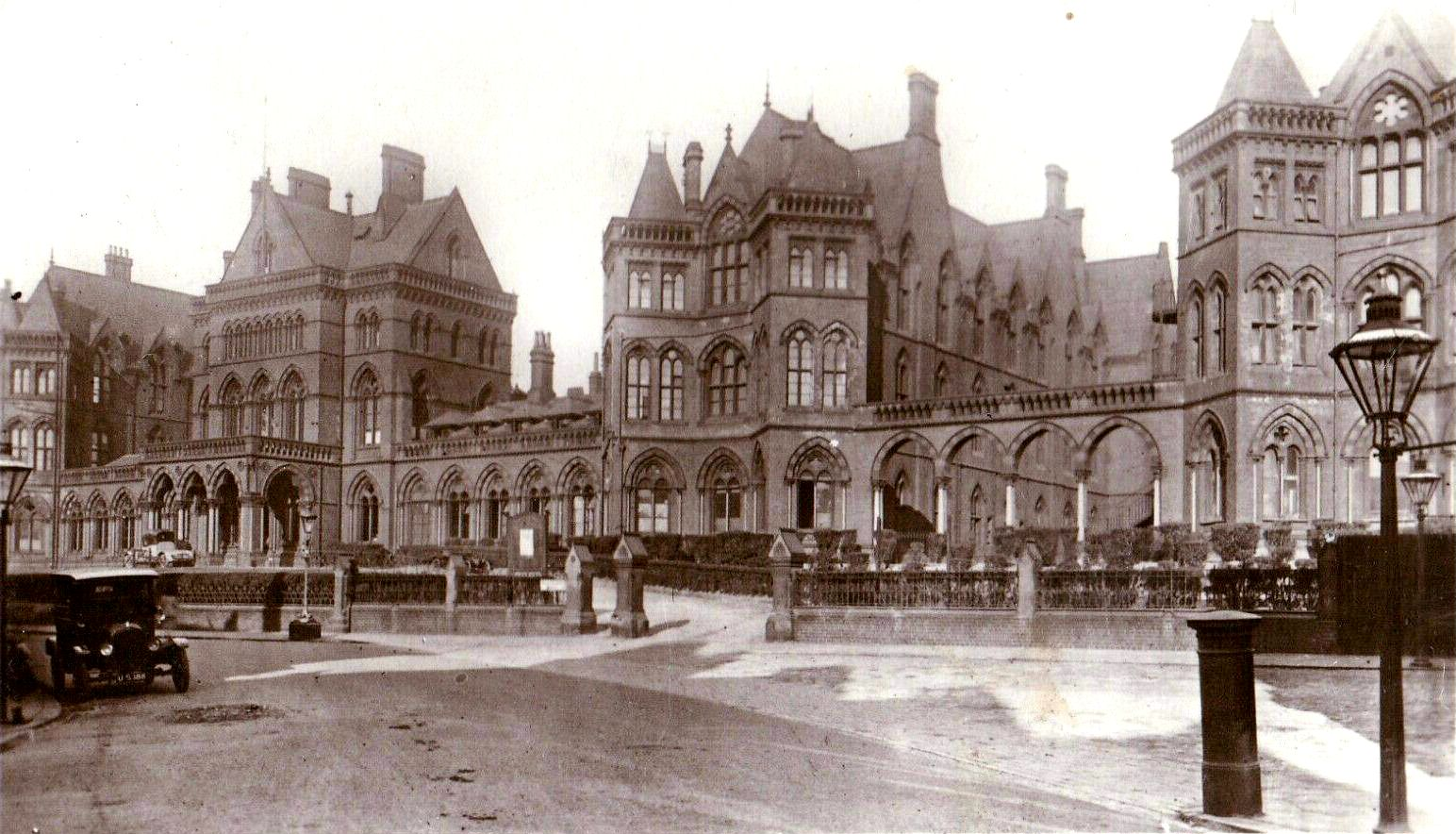
Leeds General Infirmary where Wyon ran a lab, in 1924
