= Olive Wyon =

Dr. Olive Wyon (7 March 1881 - 21 August 1966) was a British author and translator of books of the Christian faith.

== Life ==
Wyon was born in Hampstead, London, into a cultured Victorian family. The daughter of Allan Wyon, Chief Engraver of Seals to Queen Victoria, she had a brother, the Rev. Allan G. Wyon, the sculptor and medalist, and two sisters, one an Anglican Deaconess and the other a Congregational Minister.

She was a member of the faculty of St. Colm's College, Edinburgh and was given an honorary doctorate by the University of Aberdeen for her contribution to theological learning.

She died in Edinburgh in 1966, aged 85.

== Bibliography ==
=== Books by Olive Wyon ===
- An Eastern Palimpsest : A Brief Survey of the Religious Situation in Turkey, Syria, Palestine, Transjordania, Egypt, London: World Dominion Press (World Dominion Survey Series), c. 1927.
- The Challenge of Central Asia : A Brief Survey of Tibet and its Borderlands, Mongolia, North-West Kansu, Chinese Turkistan, and Russian Central Asia, London: World Dominion Press, 1929. Joint authors: Mildred Cable, F. Houghton, R. Kilgour, A. McLeish and R. W. Sturt.
- The Church and World Peace : Principles Which Should Govern a Righteous Peace Settlement, London: Embassies of Reconciliation, c. 1940.
- The Dawn Wind : A Picture of Changing Conditions Among Women in Africa and the East, London: S.C.M. Press, 1931.
- Radiant Freedom: The Story of Emma Pieczynska, London: Lutterworth Press, c. 1942.
- The School of Prayer, Philadelphia: The Westminster Press, 1944.
- The Altar Fire: Reflections on the Sacrament of the Lord's Supper, London: S.C.M. Press Ltd., !954; Philadelphia: The Westminster Press, 1954.
- The Three Windows: The Story of Ann Hunter Small, London: J. Clarke, 1954.
- Praying for Unity, London: Edinburgh House Press, 1955.
- Consider Him: Three Meditations on the Passion Story, New York: Abingdon Press, 1956.
- On the Way: Reflections on the Christian Life, London: S.C.M. Press, 1954; Philadelphia: The Westminster Press, 1956.
- The Grace of the Passion: The St Giles Lectures, 1958, SCM Press, 1959. Note: The St Giles' Lectures were delivered annually in St Giles' Cathedral, Edinburgh in the late 19th century and after a long break recommenced in 1957.
- Living Springs: New Religious Movements in Western Europe, Philadelphia: The Westminster Press, 1963.
- The World's Christmas, Philadelphia: Fortress Press, 1965.
- Prayer and Life, New York: National Council of the Churches in Christ in the US, 1965
- Desire for God: A Study of Three Spiritual Classics: Francois Feńelon, "Christian Perfection"; John Wesley, "Christian Perfection"; Evelyn Underhill, "The Spiritual Life", London: Collins, 1966.
- Prayer: An Answer to the Question Why Should I Pray and How Do I Pray?, London: Collins, 1966 (Fontana Books)
- Teachings Toward Christian Perfection: Introducing Three Spiritual Classics: Christian Perfection by Francois Feńelon, Christian Perfection by Charles Wesley, The Spiritual Life by Evelyn Underhill, New York, Women's Division of Christian Service, Board of Missions, Methodist Church, 1968.
- Prayer, Philadelphia: Fortress Press, 1978. First paperback edition.

=== Translations by Olive Wyon ===
She translated the works of theologians Emil Brunner, Adolf von Harnack, Maurice Goguel, Friedrich Heiler, Ernst Robert Curtius, Hanns Lilje, Nils Ehrenström, Jacques Ellul, Ernst Troeltsch, Basilea Schlink, Paul Seippel, Suzanne de Dietrich, Helmut Gollwitzer, and Léopold Malevez.

Her translations included:

- Emil Brunner, Dogmatics, Vol. I: The Christian Doctrine of God, Philadelphia: The Westminster Press, 1950.
- Emil Brunner, Dogmatics, Vol. II: The Christian Doctrine of Creation and Redemption, Philadelphia: The Westminster Press, 1950.
- Emil Brunner, Dogmatics, Vol. III: The Christian Doctrine of the Church, Faith and the Consummation, Philadelphia: The Westminster Press, 1950.
- Emil Brunner, The Mediator: A Study of the Central Doctrine of the Christian Faith, Lutterworth Press, 1952 (Lutterworth Library, Vol. 111).
- Nils Ehrenström, Christian Faith and the Modern State, Chicago and New York: Willett, Clark and Company, 1937. Joint translator: Denzil Patrick.
- Maurice Goguel, The Life of Jesus, London: George Allen & Unwin, 1933.
- Friedrich Heiler, The Gospel of Sadhu Sundar Singh, London: George Allen & Unwin, 1927.
- Hanns Lilje, The Last Book of the Bible : The Meaning of the Revelation of St. John, Philadelphia: Mulenberg Press, 1957.
- Paul Seippel, A Living Witness: The Life of Adèle Kamm, London: Hodder and Stoughton, 1914
- Ernst Troeltsch, The Social Teaching of the Christian Churches, London: George Allen & Unwin, 1931 (Halley Stewart Publications, 1).
