= Peter Wyon =

English engraver (1767-1822)

Peter Wyon (1767–1822) was a British engraver of medals and coins. He was born into a family who had a long tradition of dye-engraving. He was the son of George Wyon, as well as the brother of Thomas Wyon, with whom he went into business for a short time. Both his nephew, Thomas Wyon, and his son, William Wyon, held the position of Chief Engraver at the Royal Mint.

After his brother went to London, Wyon remained working in Birmingham. Wyon worked for the manufacturer and business man, Matthew Boulton (1728-1809) in Soho, Birmingham. He was associated with the Royal Birmingham Society of Artists.
