= Duke Street, Marylebone =

Street in central London, England

Coordinates: 51°30′54″N 0°09′06″W

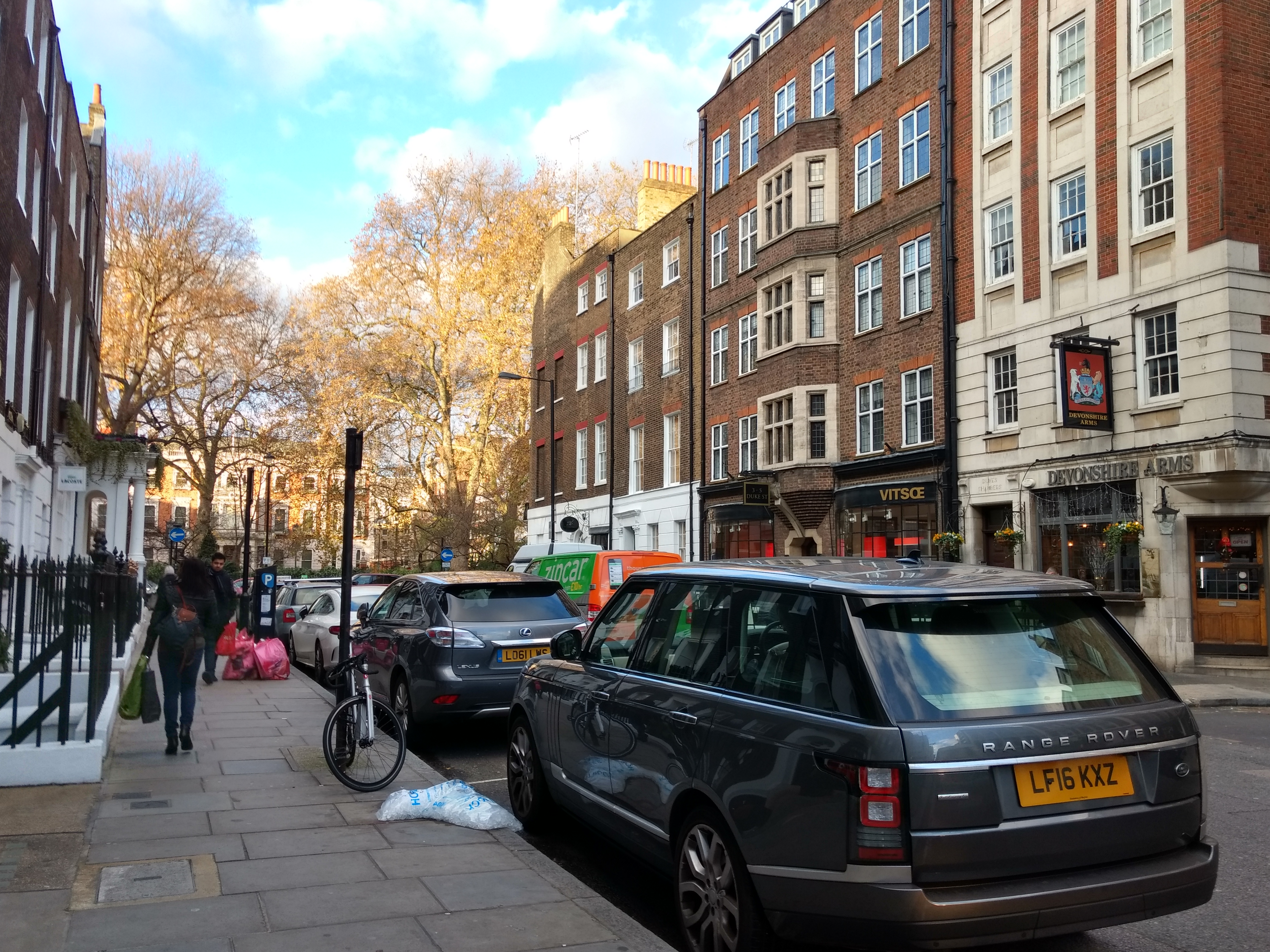
Duke Street looking north towards Manchester Square

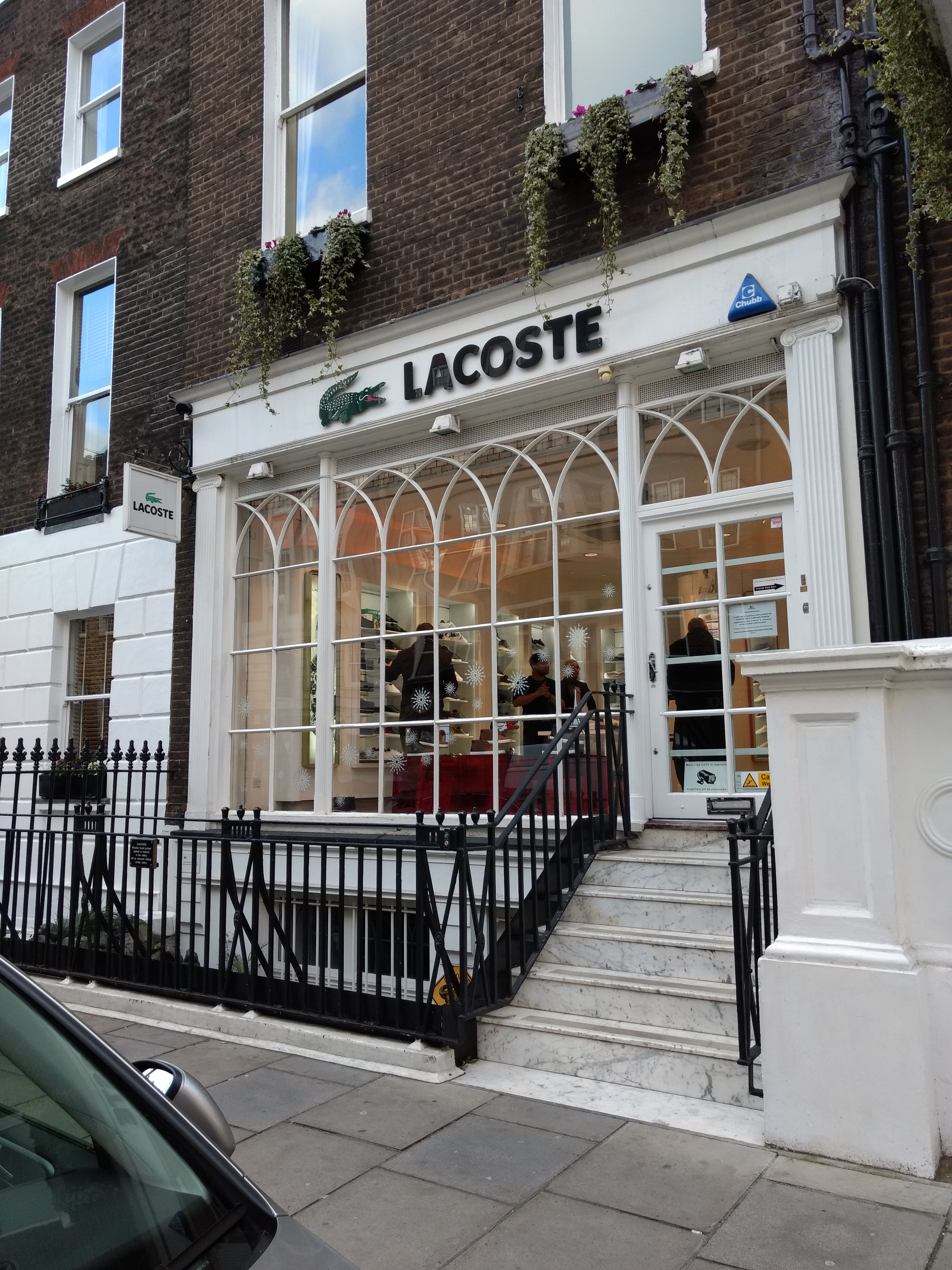
The Lacoste shop in Duke Street

Duke Street is a street crossing the western half of Oxford Street, London and connecting Wigmore Street and Grosvenor Square. It is best known as the setting for the BBC television drama series The Duchess of Duke Street and has been the headquarters of the Artists' Rifles, a regiment of the British Army Reserve, since 1880.

It is often confused with the relatively nearby central London location Duke Street, St James's which connects Piccadilly and King Street, intersecting Jermyn Street, and is the location of the Cavendish Hotel, which was the real life inspiration for the fictional hotel in The Duchess of Duke Street.

== See also ==
- 9 & 11 Duke Street
- Brown Hart Gardens
