= Allan Wyon =

Allan Wyon (1843–1907) was an English medallist and seal-engraver.

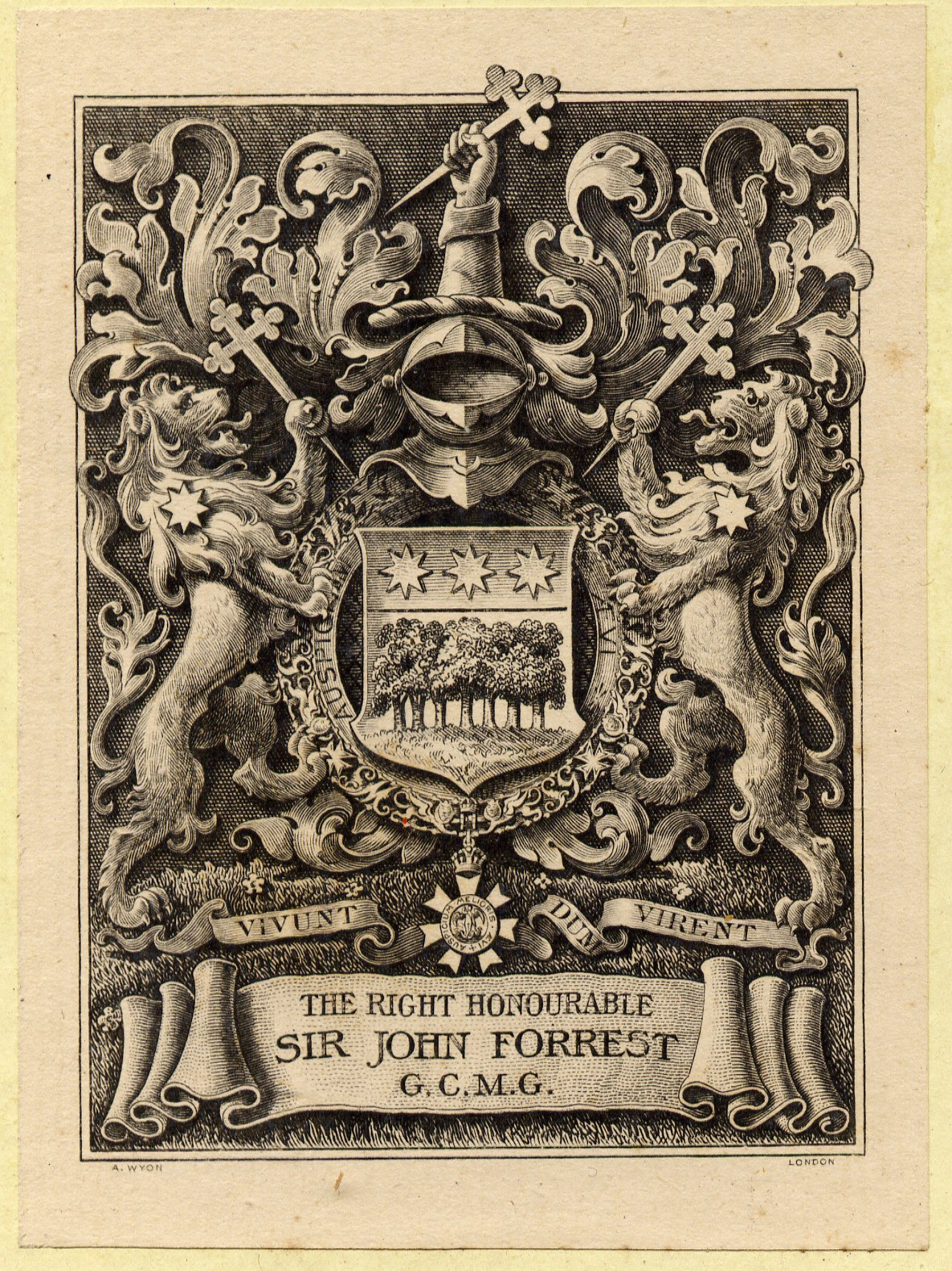
Bookplate for John Forrest, by Allan Wyon

== Life ==
He was the son of Benjamin Wyon, and the younger brother of Joseph Shepherd Wyon and Alfred Benjamin Wyon. He went into the family arts, and for a time supported his brother Joseph in medal-work. From 1884 till his death he carried on in London the business of the Wyon firm of medallists and engravers founded by his grandfather, Thomas Wyon the elder.

From 1884 to 1901 Wyon held the post of engraver of the royal seals, a post that had been successively held by his father and his two elder brothers. He was a fellow of the Society of Antiquaries of London (elected 1889) and of the Numismatic Society of London (elected 1885), and was at one time treasurer and vice-president of the British Archæological Association. His medal designs included the Jenner Medal of the Royal Society of Medicine.

Wyon died at Hampstead on 25 January 1907.

== Works ==
Wyon made the episcopal seals for the archbishops of Canterbury and York; the seal for the secretary of Scotland in 1889, and the Great Seal of Ireland in 1890. The great seal of Queen Victoria of 1899 was not his, but the work of George William de Saulles.

Among Wyon's medals were:

- Sir Joseph Whitworth (commemorating the Whitworth scholarships founded 1868);
- the Royal Jubilee medal of 1887;
- Charles Darwin (Royal Society medal, first awarded 1890);
- Max Müller, circ. 1902.

He signed in full as "Allan Wyon". Wyon also compiled and published The Great Seals of England (1887, with 55 plates), a work begun by his brother Alfred.

== Family ==
Wyon married in 1880 Harriet, daughter of G. W. Gairdner of Hampstead, and had three daughters and two sons; the elder son was Allan G. Wyon, and the younger was Guy Alfred Wyon.

== Notes ==
Attribution

This article incorporates text from a publication now in the public domain: Lee, Sidney, ed. (1912). "Wyon, Allan". Dictionary of National Biography (2nd supplement). Vol. 12. London: Smith, Elder & Co.
