= Allan G. Wyon =

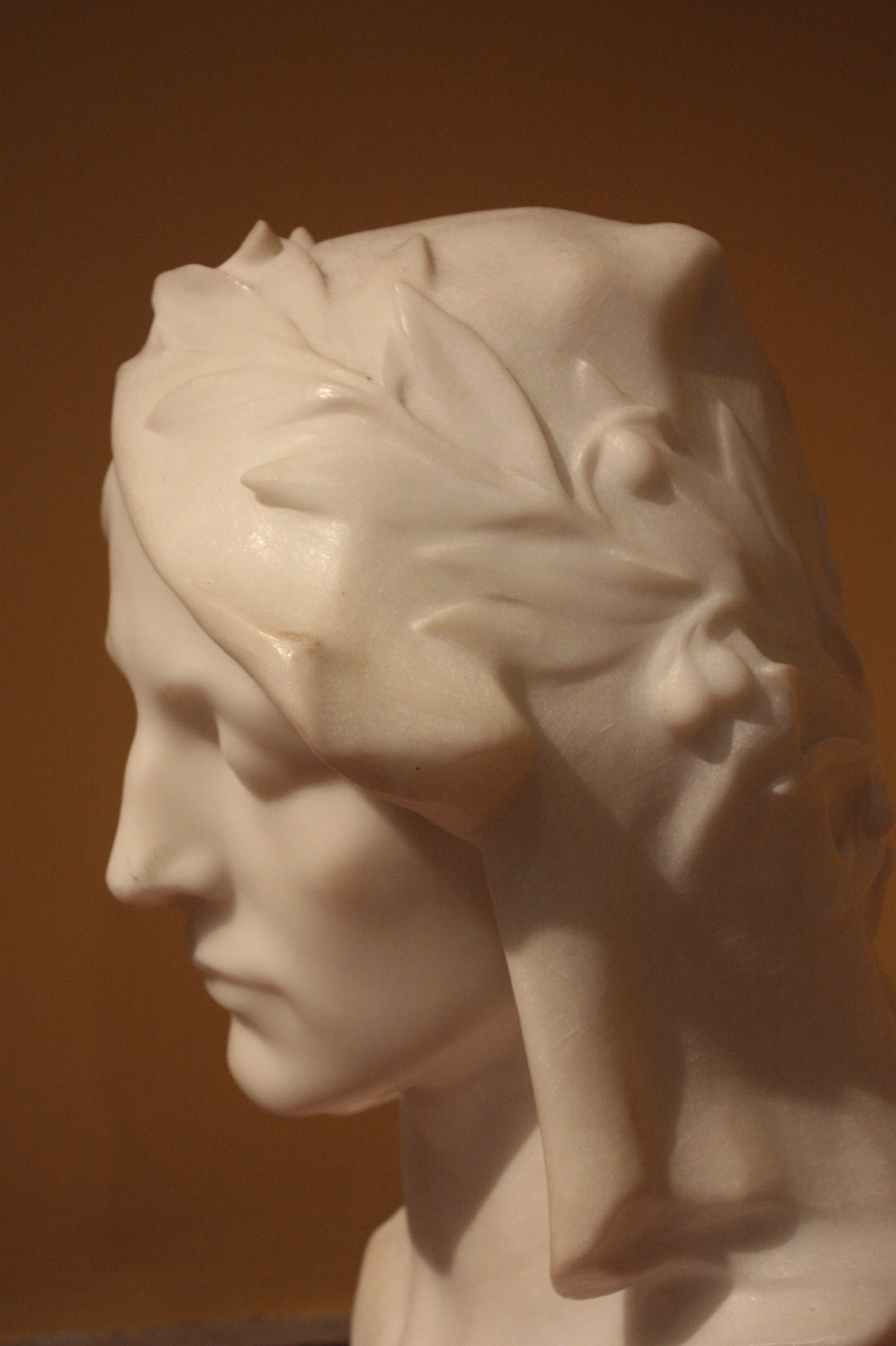
Pax Dolorosa, by Allan Gairdner Wyon, 1916, Kelvingrove Art Gallery

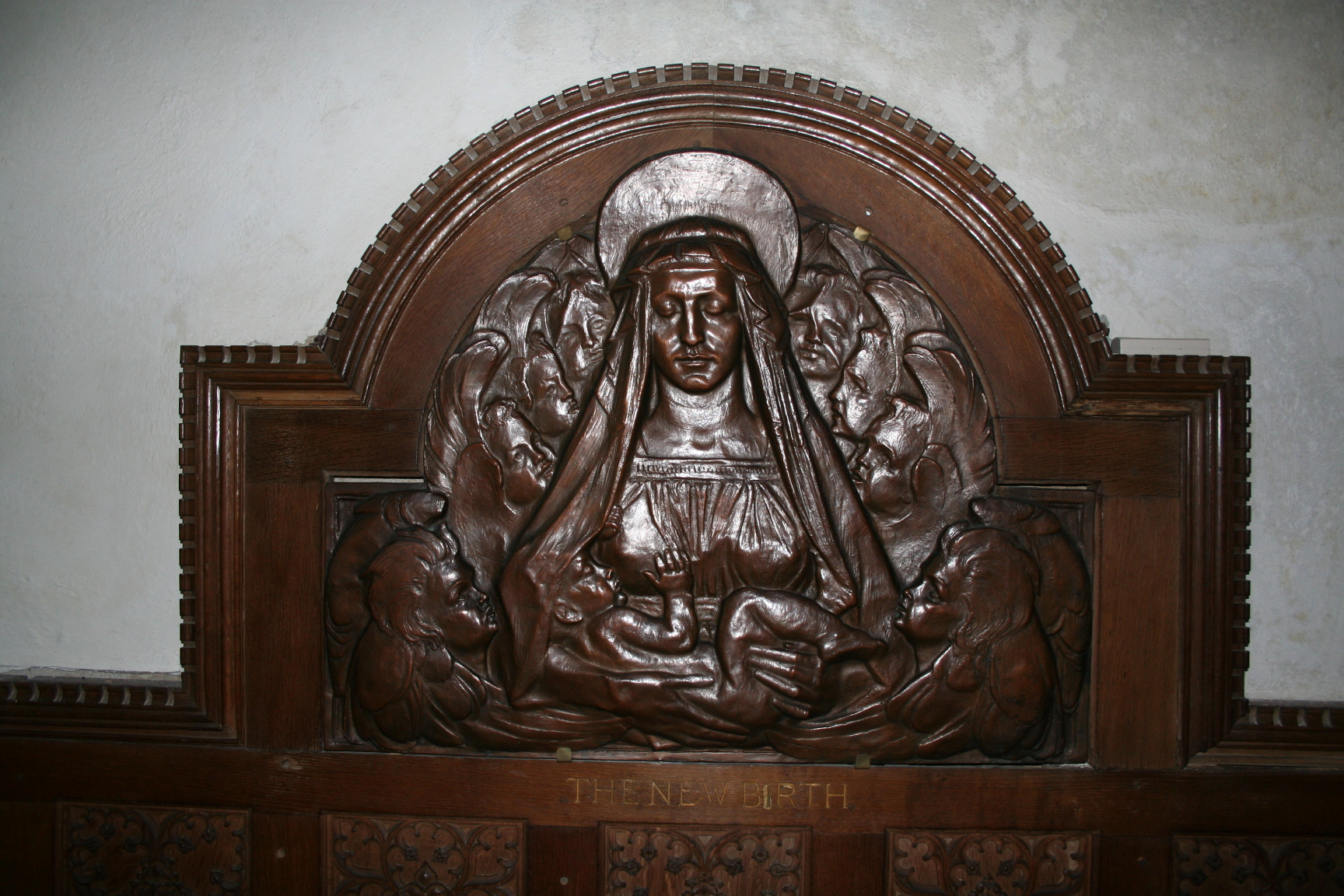
"New Birth", by Allan G. Wyon. 1931

Allan Gairdner Wyon FRBS RMS (1882 – 26 February 1962) was a British die-engraver and sculptor and, in later life, vicar in Newlyn, Cornwall.

Many of his works are memorials with a number located in British cathedrals. Other, more decorative, works include the relief of a male figure representing the East Wind on the London Underground headquarters building at 55 Broadway above St James's Park Underground Station.

== Biography ==
Wyon was born in 1882, the son of Allan Wyon FSA (1843–1907) and Harriet Gairdner. Wyon's father, two of his uncles, his grandfather and his great-grandfather successively held the position of Chief Engraver of Seals to the monarch. William Wyon (1795-1851) was official chief engraver at the Royal Mint.

Wyon attended Highgate School and, like others in his family, studied sculpture in London from 1905 to 1909 at the Royal Academy. From 1910 to 1911 he was an assistant sculptor to Hamo Thornycroft. Between 1924 and 1930 he was Honorary Secretary of the Art Workers Guild. He was a Fellow of the Royal Society of British Sculptors and also worked as a die-engraver, but took Holy Orders in 1933. From 1936 until his retirement in 1955, he was vicar of St. Peter's, Newlyn.

He married Eileen May Trench in 1910; they had one daughter. He had three sisters, Olive, and two others. One an Anglican Deaconess and the other a Congregational minister. His brother was Guy Alfred Wyon, a pathologist.

== Works ==
Wyon exhibited a wide range of sculptures, busts medals and engravings at the Royal Academy. He designed commemorative and memorial medals for the Masons, the London Chamber of Commerce, and Lloyd's.

Sculptured memorials in Salisbury Cathedral by Wyon include those to:

- Bishop Ridgeway
- Bishop Donaldson
- Lieutenant General Sir George Harper
- Hon. Edward Tennant
- Bishop Ken

Other memorials include those to:

- Bishop Percival, in Hereford Cathedral.
- Bishop Frere, in Truro Cathedral.
- Bishop Walpole, in St. Mary's Cathedral in Edinburgh.
- The combined Memorial to William Pitt, 1st Earl of Chatham, and William Pitt the Younger, at Hayes near Bromley in Kent.
- Cambrian Railways War Memorial, Oswestry, Shropshire.
- The figure of St Michael, Shropshire War memorial, Shrewsbury.
- Female standing figure with laurel wreath, Hinckley and District War Memorial.
- The Richard Corfield Memorial, at Marlborough College.
- Joseph Watson, 1st Baron Manton, in Leeds Infirmary, Great George Street Entrance Hall, unveiled 1931.
- Allan G. Wyon's brother Guy Alfred Wyon (1883–1924), in Old Leeds School of Medicine in Thoresby Place, Leeds.

Other works:

- The Sorrows of Mankind, 1920
- Egyptian Nude, 1917
- Madonna and Child, Newlyn Church Cornwall
- Christ the leader, In the South Transept of St Columb Major Church, Cornwall
- New Birth, 1931, West wall of the baptistery of St Columb Major Church, Cornwall
- Lion on Rock, 1920
- Seal for the London School of Hygiene & Tropical Medicine
- East Wind on 55 Broadway, headquarters of the Underground Electric Railways Company of London (now London Underground)
- Bronze Plaques of Kenrick and Jefferson previously at Kenrick and Jefferson Printing Works Ltd http://blackcountryhistory.org/collections/getrecord/GB146_BS-KJ/ now privately owned
