= Joseph Shepherd Wyon =

British engraver

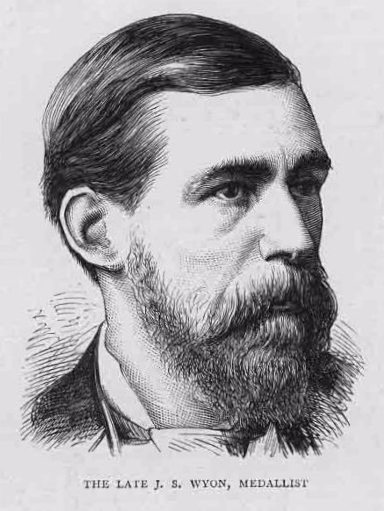
Joseph Shepherd Wyon

Joseph Shepherd Wyon (28 July 1836 – 12 August 1873) was a British medallist and seal-engraver.

== Life ==
Born in London on 28 July 1836, he was the eldest son of Benjamin Wyon. He was educated by his father, and studied in the Royal Academy Schools, where he gained two silver medals.

On 2 December 1858 Wyon was appointed Chief Engraver of the Seals, a post previously held by his father, Benjamin Wyon, and grandfather, Thomas Wyon the elder. He died at Winchester on 12 August 1873.

== Works ==
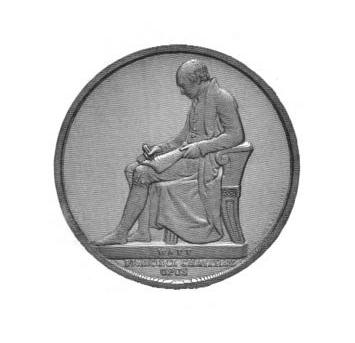
Medal of James Watt, by Joseph Shepherd Wyon

Wyon's first important work was a medal of James Watt. On Robert Stephenson's recommendation, it was adopted as the prize medal of the Institution of Civil Engineers.

In his work as a medallist, Wyon was aided by his brothers Alfred Benjamin Wyon and Allan Wyon. The medals are often signed "J. S. and A. B. Wyon". They included:

- 1861, Steevens's Hospital medals, Dublin (Cusack prize);
- 1863, Seal of the Confederate States.
- 1863, entry of Princess Alexandra into London;
- 1846–65, New Zealand war medal;
- 1867, confederation of provinces of Canada;
- the great seal of the dominion of Canada;
- reception of the sultan of Turkey in London;
- 1867–8, Abyssinian war medal; and
- 1872, Prince of Wales's recovery.

== Notes ==
Attribution

This article incorporates text from a publication now in the public domain: Lee, Sidney, ed. (1900). "Wyon, Joseph Shepherd". Dictionary of National Biography. Vol. 63. London: Smith, Elder & Co.
