= Alfred Benjamin Wyon =

English medallist

- Born: 28 September 1837; Willesden, Middlesex, England
- Died: 4 June 1884 (aged 46); Hampstead, Middlesex, England
- Known for: Medals

Alfred Benjamin Wyon (28 September 1837 – 4 June 1884) was an English medallist, a member of the Wyon family of engravers and medallists.

== Biography ==
Alfred Benjamin Wyon was born in Willesdon, then part of Middlesex but now an outer suburb of London, on 28 September 1837. He was the third son of Benjamin Wyon, also a medallist as well as Chief Engraver of the Seals. He was a brother of Allan Wyon and Joseph Shepherd Wyon. Alfred was trained alongside Joseph under his father and later at the Royal Academy Schools.

Alfred, with his brother Joseph, took over his father's firm, renaming it J. S. and A. B. Wyon. They also both became Chief Engraver of the Seals from 1865 and, with only Alfred having the title after Joseph's death in 1873.

Alfred Wyon married Kate in 1868. He died in his home in Hampstead in 1884.

== Works ==
Alfred's brother Allan Wyon completed and posthumously published his work, The Great Seals of England, in 1887.

== See also ==
- Wyon family
