= Thomas Wyon =

Thomas Wyon the Younger (1792 – 22/23 September 1817) was an English medallist and chief engraver at the Royal Mint.

== Life ==
Wyon was born in Birmingham. He was apprenticed to his father, Thomas Wyon (1767–1830), the chief engraver of the King's seals, who taught him the art of engraving on steel; subsequently he studied at the sculpture school of the Royal Academy in London, where he earned silver medals in both the antique and the life class. In 1809, he struck his first medal, presented to Lieutenant Pearce, R.N. In 1810, he won the gold medal of the Society of Arts for medal engraving; the die, representing a head of Isis, was purchased by the society and used for striking its prize medals. From this period he produced many medals for schools, societies, Pitt clubs, and other institutions.

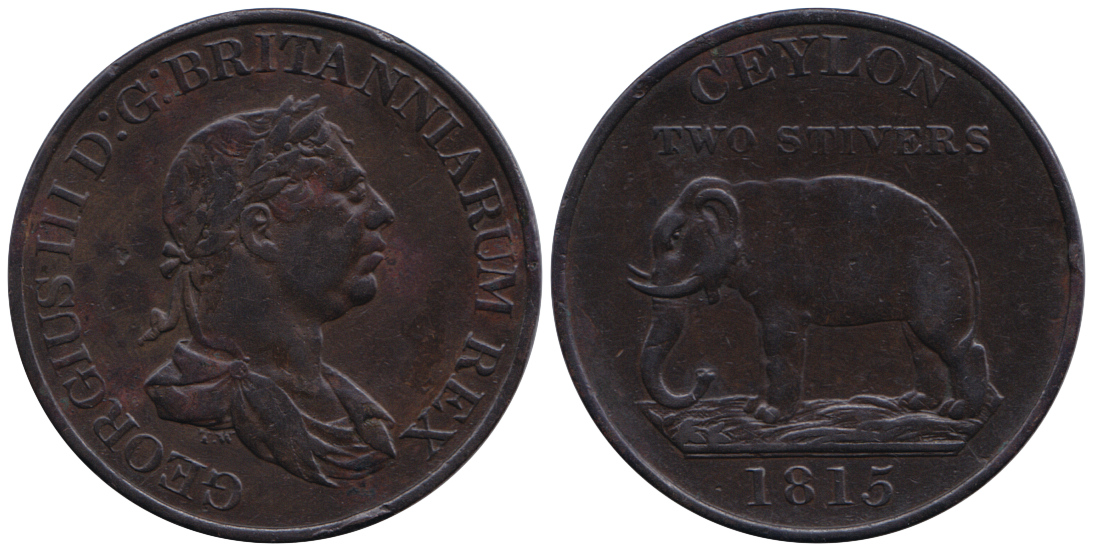
2 stivers coin of British Ceylon 1815. On the reverse are the initials of Thomas Wyon (T.W.)

On 20 November 1811, Wyon was appointed probationary engraver to the Royal Mint, and was employed in making the bank tokens for England and Ireland, and coins for the British colonies and for Hanover. He also engraved his medal commemorative of the peace and his Manchester Pitt medal. On 13 Oct. 1815 he was appointed chief engraver to the mint, being then only twenty-three. The next year he brought out the new silver coinage for the United Kingdom (half-crown, shilling, and sixpence), designing the reverses himself. In 1817 he struck the maundy money, and began to make his pattern crown-piece in rivalry of Thomas Simon.

Signs of consumption now began to appear, and Wyon—a modest and talented artist—died on 23 (or 22) September 1817 at the Priory Farmhouse, near Hastings. He was buried in the graveyard attached to Christ Church, Southwark.

His younger brother, Benjamin Wyon (1802–1858), his nephews, Joseph Shepherd Wyon (1836–1873) and Alfred Benjamin Wyon (1837–1884), and his cousin, William Wyon (1795–1851) were also distinguished medallists.

== Work ==
Among Wyon's medals may be mentioned: 1809, Pearce medal; 1810, Isis medal (re-engraved in 1813); medal of Wellington; 1812, Wooldridge medal; medal for Royal Naval College, Portsmouth; 1813, Manchester Pitt Club medal; "Upper Canada preserved"; 1814, medals presented to the North American Indians; medal of the tsar of Russia struck during the visit of the Grand Duchess of Oldenburg to the English mint; treaty of Paris (published by Rundell & Co. from his "Peace checking the Fury of War," a design which had gained the gold medal of the Society of Arts); centenary of accession of house of Brunswick (for the corporation of Cork), and Liverpool Pitt club medal; 1815, Waterloo medal, with reverse, Victory, adapted from a Greek coin of Elis (Mayo, Medals, plate 22); and 1817, opening of Waterloo Bridge. Wyon also engraved (1813) seals for the Newcastle Antiquarian Society, the Chester Canal Company, and (c. 1815) the Limerick chamber of commerce.

Wyon's engraving of Queen Victoria for the City of London medal was used as the basis for the design of the Penny Black, the world's first postage stamp. Examples of the medal, in silver and bronze, are held in the R M Phillips Collection by the British Postal Museum & Archive.
