= Benjamin Wyon =

Benjamin Wyon (9 January 1802 – 21 November 1858) was a British engraver of seals, and medallist.

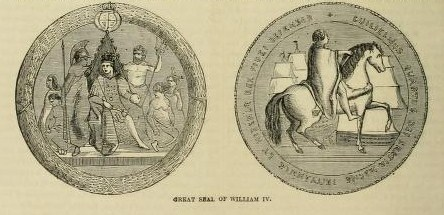
Great Seal of George IV, design by Benjamin Wyon

== Life ==
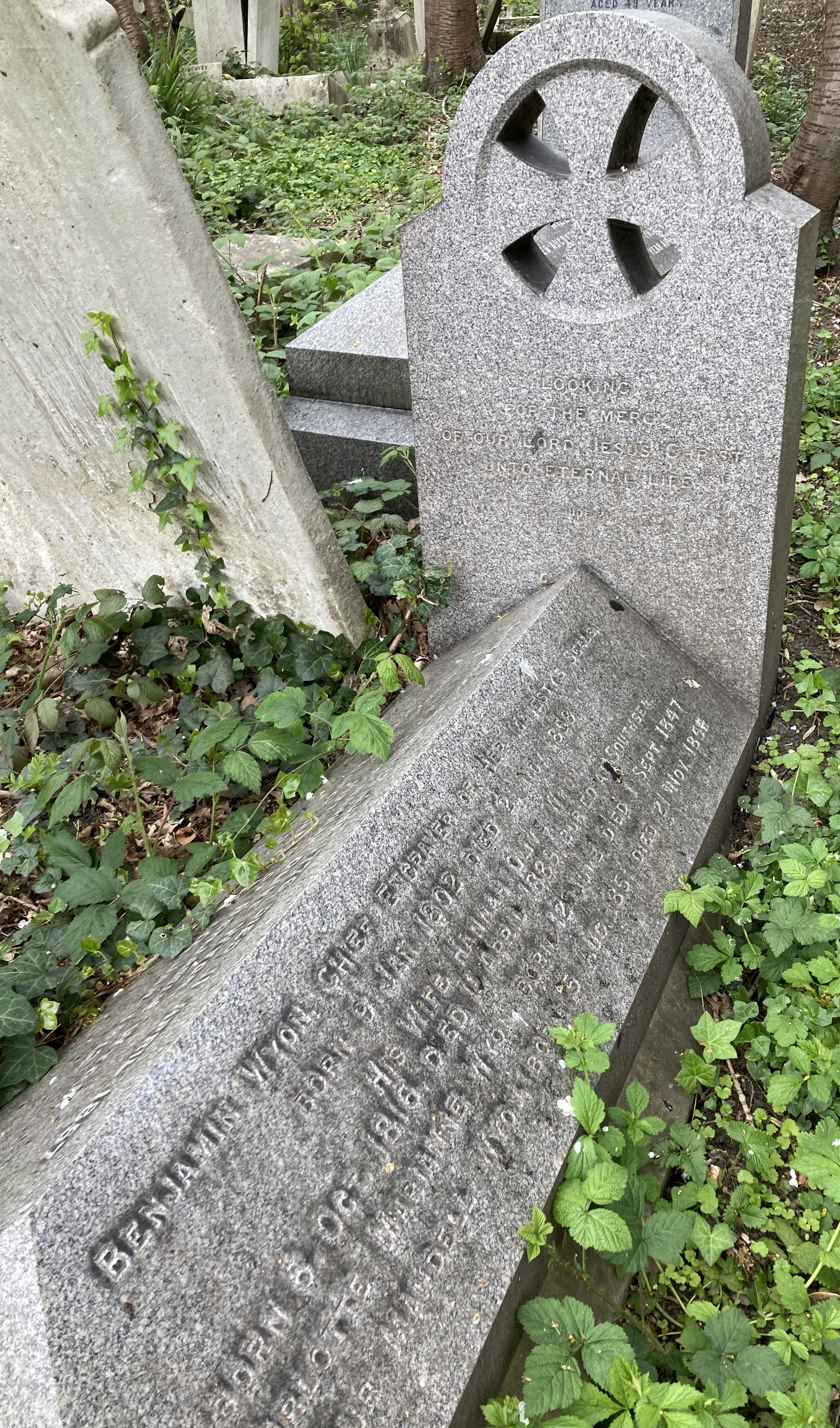
Family grave of Benjamin Wyon in Highgate Cemetery

Born in John Street, Blackfriars, London, on 9 January 1802, he was the second son of Thomas Wyon the elder. He received instruction from his elder brother, Thomas Wyon the younger, and in 1821 gained the gold medal of the Society of Arts for a medal die of figures. He also gained the silver medal of the Royal Academy, for a die with the head of Apollo.

On 10 January 1831 Wyon was appointed Chief Engraver of the Seals and made the Great Seal of William IV.

He died in London on 21 November 1858 and is buried on the west side of Highgate Cemetery.

== Works ==
Wyon produced medals, his signatures being "B. Wyon" and "Benj. Wyon". Among them were:

- 1821, Visit of George IV to Ireland (obverse only);
- 1831, Opening of London Bridge;
- 1832, Passing of Reform Bill;
- 1834, Foundation of City of London School;
- 1842, Pollock Prize Medals;
- 1849, Opening of London Coal Exchange;
- 1851, Shakespeare Prize, City of London School;
- 1854/1855, reverse of the Crimea Medal as the obverse, the diademed head of Queen Victoria, was a reuse of an engraving of William Wyon RA;
- 1855, Visits of the Emperor of the French and of the King of Sardinia to the Guildhall, London.

Seals produced by Wyon include The Seal of George Augustus Selwyn, the first Anglican Bishop of New Zealand in 1841.

== Family ==
Wyon was the father of Joseph Shepherd Wyon, Alfred Benjamin Wyon, and Allan Wyon.
