= Thomas Wyon the elder =

English engraver (1767–1830)

- Born: 1767
- Died: 1830 (aged 62–63)
- Known for: English Chief Engraver of the Seals
- Children: Thomas Wyon the younger, Benjamin Wyon, Edward William Wyon

Thomas Wyon the elder (1767–1830) of the Wyon family was an English engraver of dies, who became Chief Engraver of the Seals.

== Life ==
He was the eldest of the four sons of George Wyon, an engraver. Around 1796, he went into business in Birmingham with his brother Peter, father of William Wyon, as a general die-engraver. They resided at Lionel Street in 1797.

Wyon engraved many dies for tokens, especially part of the Coventry series of buildings. From 1800 he carried on business in London, and on 30 September 1816 was appointed Chief Engraver of the Seals. He died on 18 October 1830 in Nassau Street, London.

== Personal life ==
Wyon was the father of Thomas Wyon the younger, Benjamin Wyon, and Edward William Wyon the sculptor.

== Notes ==
Attribution

This article incorporates text from a publication now in the public domain: Lee, Sidney, ed. (1900). "Wyon, Thomas (1767-1830)". Dictionary of National Biography. Vol. 63. London: Smith, Elder & Co.
