= List of medallists =

List of medal sculptors and artists

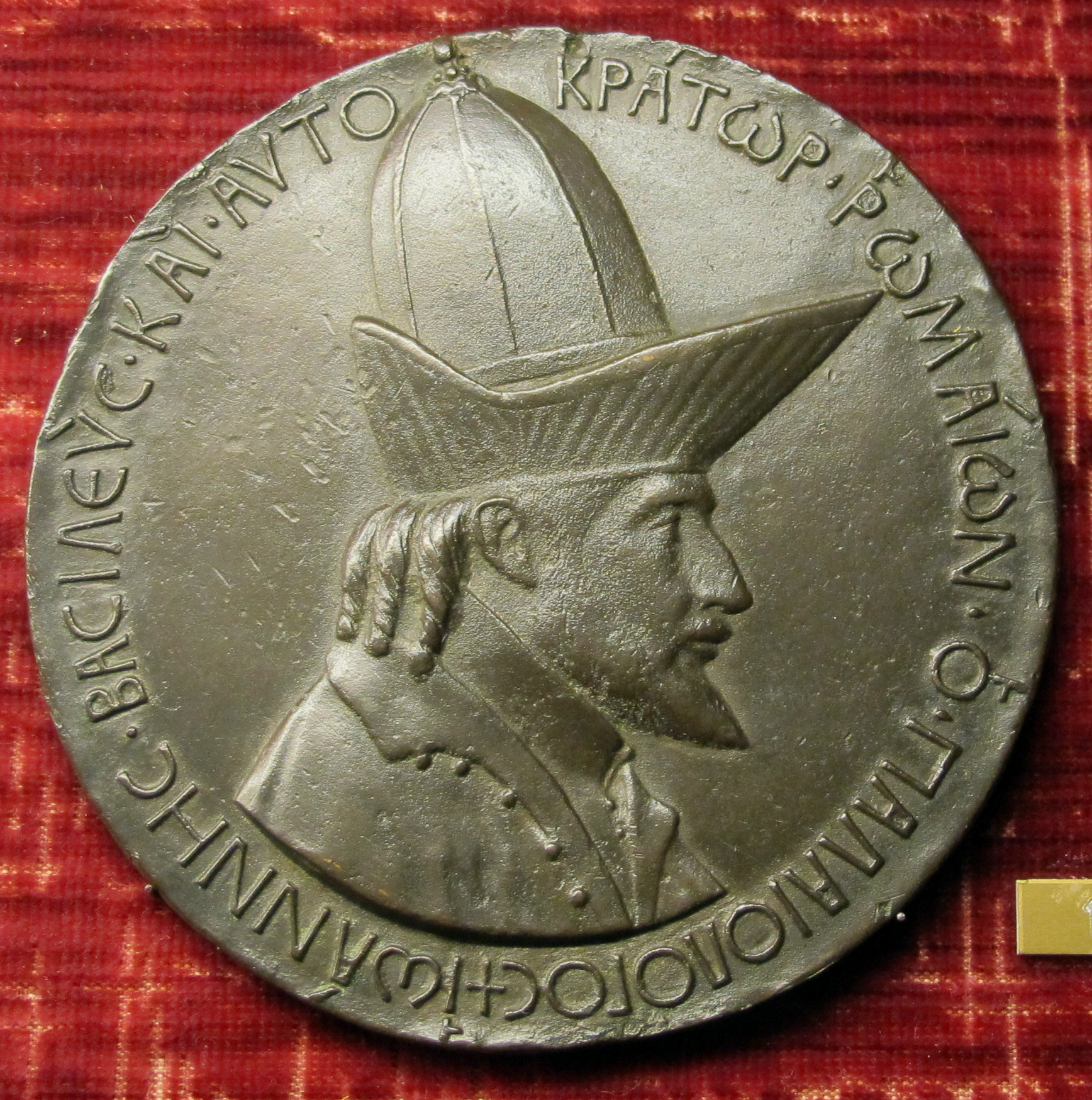
Medal of the Emperor John VIII Palaiologos during his visit to Florence, by Pisanello (1438). This was the first portrait medal. The legend reads, in Greek: "John the Palaiologos, basileus and autokrator of the Romans".

A medallist or medalist (see spelling differences) is an artist who designs medals, plaquettes, badges, coins and similar small works in relief in metal. Art medals are a well-known and highly collected form of small bronze sculpture, most often in bronze, and are considered a form of exonumia. "Medalist/medallist" is confusingly the same word used in sport and other areas (but not usually in military contexts) for the winner of a medal as an award. Medallists very often also design, or produce the dies for coins as well. In modern times medallists are mostly primarily sculptors of larger works, but in the past the number of medals and coins produced were sufficient to allow specialists who spent most of their career producing them. Medallists are also often confusingly referred to as "engravers" in reference works, referring to the "engraving" of dies, although this is often in fact not the technique used; however many also worked in engraving the technique in printmaking.

Art medals have been produced since the late Renaissance period, and, after some classical precedents and Late Medieval revivals, the form was essentially invented by Pisanello, who is credited with the first portrait medal, which has remained a very popular type. He cast them like bronze sculptures, rather than minting them like coins.

== By nationality ==
An incomplete list, biased towards the 19th-century onwards; see also Category:Medallists. (Note: Where an artist is best known by other than their first given name, the commonly used name is highlighted in boldface.)

=== Argentinian ===
- Soto Avendaño
- José Bellagamba
- Alfredo Bigatti (1898 – 1964)
- Ernesto de la Cárcova (1866 – 1927)
- Arturo Dresco (1875 – 1961)
- Juan Gottuzzo (1858 Buenos Aires – 1924 Buenos Aires)
- José Horta
- Jorge Maria Lubary (1862 Buenos Aires – 1938 Buenos Aires). Signature: J.M.LUBARY
- Victor de Pol (1865 Venice – 1925 Buenos Aires)
- Francisco Alberto Rossi (1878 Buenos Aires - ). Signature AF. Rossi.
- Marcos Constante Rossi (1872 Buenos Aires - 1940?). Signature C. Rossi.

=== Australian ===
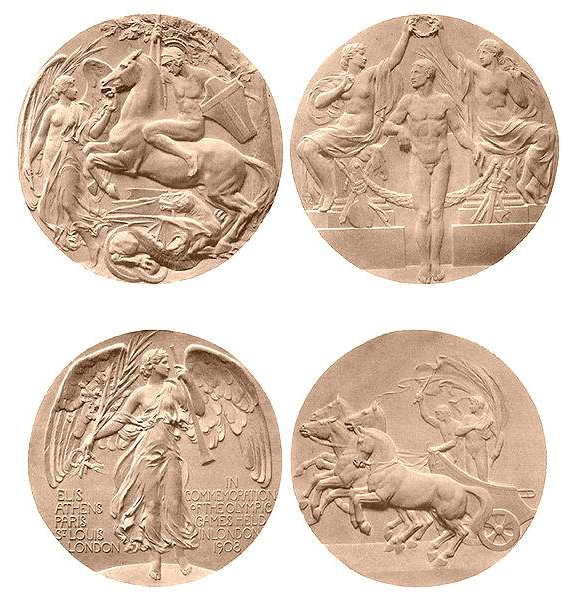
Medals for the 1908 Olympic Games, designed by Sir Edgar Bertram Mackennal

- Ernst August Altmann (circa 1850-1920), jeweller, die-maker and engraver.
- W.J. Amor, Sculptor, (1860 England – after 1947 Sydney, New South Wales)
- William Leslie Bowles, Sculptor, (1885 Leichhardt, Sydney, New South Wales - 1954 Frankston, Victoria)
- Stuart Leslie Devlin, Sculptor, (1931 Geelong, Victoria - 2018 Chichester, United Kingdom)
- Vladimir Gottwald (born 1950 in Czechia)
- Horst Hahne, Chief Engraver of the Royal Australian Mint Canberra (born 1940 in Frankfurt am Main, Germany)
- Stanley James Hammond MBE, Sculptor, 1913 Trentham, Victoria – 2000 Melbourne, Victoria
- Rayner Hoff (1894 – 1937)
- Ing Jong (since 2011 coin designer at Perth Mint)
- Sir Edgar **Bertram** Mackennal (1863 – 1931)
- Andor Mészáros (1900 – 1972)
- Michael Meszaros (born 1945)
- Mark Nodea (born 1968 Derby, Western Australia)
- Dora Ohlfsen (1877 – 1948)
- Wojciech Pietranik (born 1950)
- Charles Douglas Richardson (1853 – 1932) Signature: CDM
- Harry Stokes (active 1880 – 1901) Signature: H.S.
- Thomas Stokes (1831 Edgbaston, Birmingham, England – 1910 Alphington, Melbourne, Victoria) founder of Stokes & Son in 1893.
- Jeanette Timbery (born 1941 La Perouse, Sydney)

=== Austrian ===
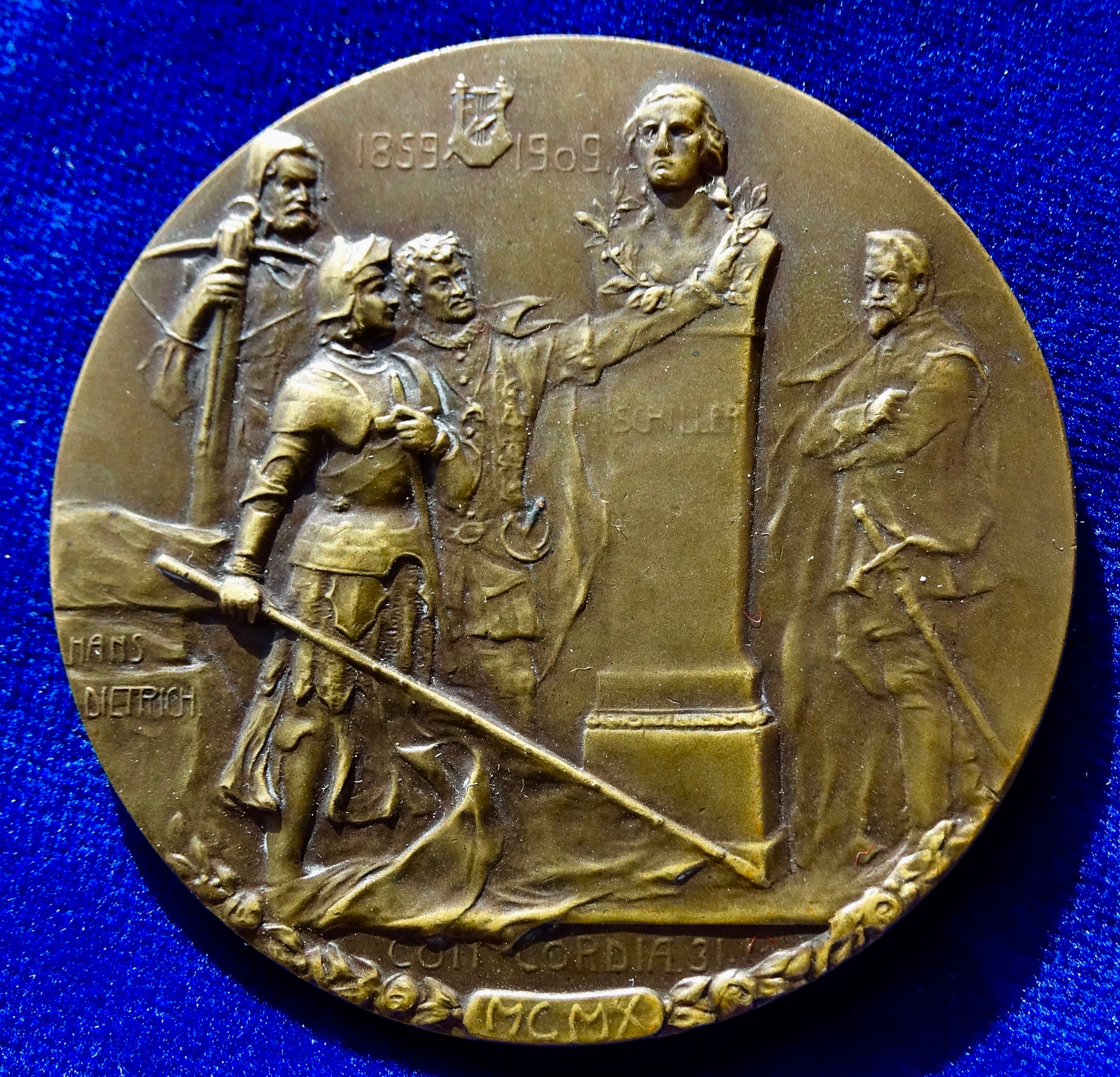
Schiller's 150th Birthday, Art Nouveau uniface Bronze-Medal 1909 by Hans Dietrich

- Helmut Andexlinger (born 1973 in Linz, Oberösterreich)
- Michael Blümelhuber (1865 – 1936)
- Kurt Bodlak (born 1924 in Vienna — died 2017 in Kirchberg am Wechsel)
- Sir Joseph Edgar Boehm (1834 Vienna, Austria – 1890 London, England)
- Peter Breithut (1869 – 1930)
- Josef Cesar (1814 – 1876)
- Josef Christian Christlbauer (1827 – 1897)
- Hans Dietrich (1868 – 1936)
- Ignaz Donner (1752 – 1803)
- Franz Gaul (1802 – 1974)
- Hans Gerstmayr (1882 – 1987)
- Josef Fabi (1780 Mint-warden at Günzburg on the Maria Theresia Thalers). Signature: S.F. in conjunction with Tobias Johann Schöbel.
- Emil Fuchs (1866 – 1929)
- Heinrich Friedrich Füger (1751 – 1818)
- Edwin Grienauer (1893 – 1964)
- Helmuth Gsöllpointner (born 1933)
- Grete Hartmann (1869 – 1946) née Chrobak
- Philipp Häusler (1887 Panczowa, Hungary, today Pančevo, Serbia - 1966 Frankfurt am Main)
- Alfred Hofmann (1879 – 1958)
- Otto Hofner (1879 – 1946)
- Ludwig Hujer (1872 – 1968)
- Friedensreich Hundertwasser (1928 – 2000)
- Heinrich Jauner (1833 – 1912)
- Josef Kaiser (1954 Bač, Vojvodina -)
- Heinrich Ernst Karl (1781 Vienna – 1854 Kremnitz)
- Josef Köblinger (1912 Innsbruck – 1960)
- Hans Köttenstorfer (1911 Steyr – 1995 Steyr, Oberösterreich, Austria)
- Franz Kounitzky (1880 Vienna – 1928 Eichgraben)
- Ernst Wilhelm Kubiena (1902 Neutitschein, Moravia – 1973 Salzburg)
- Friedrich Leisek (1839 Vienna - 1914 Vienna)
- Rudolf Marschall (1873 – 1967)
- Friedrich Mayr (1929 – 2019)
- Rudolf Neuberger (1861 – 1916)
- Franz Xaver Pawlik (1865 – 1906)
- Karl Perl (1876 Liezen, Styria – 1965 Vienna)
- Thomas Pesendorfer (born 1952 in Marchtrenk, Oberösterreich) Signature: TP
- Wolfgang Pichl (1931 Innsbruck - 2003 Linz, Austria)
- Anton Pittner (1814 – 1892)
- Richard Placht (Bohemian, 1880–1962)
- Michael Powolny (1871 Judenburg, Styria, Austria – 1954 Vienna)
- Carl Radnitzky (1818 Vienna – 1901 Vienna)
- Hans Schaefer (1875 Sternberg, Moravia – 1933 Chicago, Illinois)
- Anton Scharff (1845 – 1903)
- Rudolf Schmidt (1894 – 1980)
- Tobias Johann Schöbel (1762 – 1789). Mint-master at Günzburg. Signature: S.F. in conjunction with Josef Fabi.
- Josef Schön (1809 Vienna – 1843 Vienna, Austria). Signature: I. SCHÖN
- Stefan Schwartz (1851 Neutra, Hungary – 1924 Raabs an der Thaya, Austria)
- Johann Schwerdtner (1834 – 1920)
- Franz Stiasny (1881 – 1941)
- Josef Hermann Tautenhayn (1837 – 1911)
- Josef Johann Tautenhayn (1868 Speising bei Wien – 1962 Vienna)
- Fritz Tiefenthaler (1929 Matrei/Brenner, Tyrol – 2010 Vienna)
- Oskar Thiede (1879 – 1961)
- Ascher Wappenstein (about 1780 Kraków, today in Poland -)
- Carl Waschmann (1848 – 1905)
- Anton Rudolf Weinberger (1879 – 1936?)
- Ferdinand Maria Josef Welz (1915 – 2008)
- Johann Nepomuk Wirth (1753 – 1811)
- Franz Zeichner (1778 – 1862)
- Alfred Zierler (born 1933)
- Helmut Zobl (born 1941)

=== Belgian ===
- Jules Baetes (1861 – 1937)
- Armand Bonnetain (1883 – 1973)
- Alasia Borghese (born 1926)
- Joseph-Pierre Braemt (1796 – 1864)
- Georges André Brunet (1902 Brussels – 1986)
- Eugène Canneel (1882 – 1966)
- Albert Carlens (1789 – 1873)
- Guillaume Charlier (1854 – 1925)
- Eugène Jean De Bremaecker (1879 – 1963)
- Oscar de Clerck (1892 Oostende – 1968 Sint-Stevens-Woluwe)
- Floris de Cuyper (1875 – 1965)
- Paul De Greef (1926 – 1988)
- Marnix D'Haveloose (1885 – 1973)
- François De Hondt (1786 – 1862)
- Jean-Baptiste DeKeyser (born 1857, year of death unknown)
- Maxine Real Delsarte (1888 – 1954)
- Victor Joseph Ghislain Demanet (1895 – 1964)
- Isidore-Lievin De Rudder (1855 – 1943)
- Louis-Antoine de Smeth (1883 – 1964)
- Pieter De Soete (1886 – 1948)
- Godefroid Devreese (1861 Courtrai (Flanders) – 1941 Brussels, Belgium)
- Auguste De Wever (born 1856, year of death unknown)
- Paul-Maurice Dubois (1859 – 1938)
- Josuë Dupon (1864 – 1935)
- Louis Dupont (1896 – 1967)
- Toon Dupuis (1877 – 1937)
- Antoine Fisch (1827 – 1892)
- Joseph Fisch (1870 – 1916)
- Paul Fisch (1865 Brussels - ?) son of Antoine Fisch
- François Auguste Fonson (1845 - 1920)
- Jean-Barthélemy Fonson (1808 - 1882)
- Jules Fonson (1871 – 1937)
- Édouard Louis Geerts (1846 Brussels – 1889 Ixelles)
- Léon Gobert (1869 – 1935)
- Laurent Joseph Hart (1810 – 1860)
- Frans Jochems (1880 – 1949)
- Jules Jooris
- Jules Jourdain (1873 Namur – 1957 Brussels)
- Adolphe Christian Jouvenel (1798 – 1867)
- Jan Alfons Keustermans (born 1940)
- Jules Lagae (1862 – 1931)
- Karl Lateur (1873 - 1949)
- Paul Lateur (1909 - 1993)
- Jean Lecroart (1883 Laeken near Brussels – 1967)
- Dolf Ledel (1893 – 1976)
- Hippolyte Le Roy (1857 Liège – 1943 Ghent)
- Luc Luycx (born 1958)
- Alfonse "Alf" Mauquoy (1880 Antwerp – 1954)
- Alphonse Michaux (1860 – 1928)
- Georges Petit (1879 – 1958)
- Joseph Arnold Pingret (1798 – 1862)
- René Pirart (1887 – 1952)
- Marcel Rau(1886 – 1966)
- Jacques II Roëttiers (1698 Bromley, Kent – 1772 Brussels)
- Victor Rousseau (1865 – 1954)
- Charles Samuel (1862 – 1939)
- Henri Thiery (1875 – 1941)
- Robert van de Velde (1895 – 1978)
- Madeleine van Dionant (1903 – 1984)
- Philo Van Riel
- Geo Verbanck (1881 – 1961)
- Franz Vermeylen (1857 Louvain – 1922)
- Adrien Veyrat (1803 – 1883)
- Thomas Jules Vinçotte (1850 Antwerp-Borgerhout – 1925 Brussels)
- Charles Wiener (1832 – 1888)
- Jacob Wiener (1815 Kamp-Lintfort-Hoerstgen – 1899 Brussels)
- Léopold Wiener (1823 – 1891)
- François Wissaert (1855 Brussels – 1929 Overijse)
- Paul Wissaert (1885 – 1972)
- Joseph Witterwulghe (1883 Brussels – 1967 Ukkel near Brussels). Engraver of medals commemorating WW1.
- Marcel "Marc" Wolfers (1886 Brussels – 1976)
- Philippe Wolfers (1858 – 1929)
- Jean Würden (1807 Cologne – 1874 Brussels). Signature: WURDEN

=== Bermudian ===
- Eldon Trimingham III (born 1956)

=== British ===
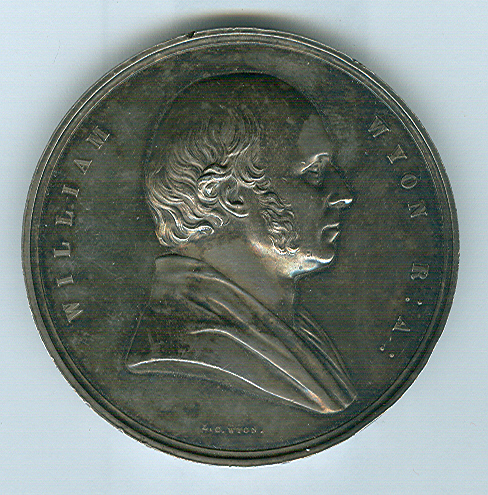
Posthumous medallic portrait of William Wyon by his son L. C. Wyon (1854). Both designed coins for Queen Victoria

- George Gammon Adams (1821 – 1898)
- Abigail Burt (born 1989). British Art Medal Society Medallist
- William Henry James Blakemore, Engraver, (1871 Birmingham, West Midlands – 1945 Croydon, South London) Signature: WHJB
- Sir Joseph Edgar Boehm (1834 Vienna, Austria – 1890 London, England)
- Matthew Boulton (1728 Birmingham – 1809 Birmingham)
- Frank Bowcher (1864 Islington – 1938 London)
- Sir Thomas Brock (1847 – 1922)
- William Brown (Gem-engraver) (1748 – 1825 London)
- Edward Geoffrey Brian Colley (born 1934 Gillingham, Kent)
- John Croker (1670-1741)
- Linda Crook (born 1943). British Art Medal Society Medallist
- Joseph Davis (died c. 1857)
- Ron Dutton (born 1935). British Art Medal Society Medallist
- George William de Saulles (1862 – 1903) Signatures: "DES", "DS", or "WS".
- Robert Elderton (Born 1948)
- Elkington & Co. (1861 Birmingham - 1963)
- Thomas Fattorini Ltd (from c 1860s). British Art Medal Society Medallist
- Arthur Fenwick (active in Birmingham 1888 - 1951)
- Joseph Fray (active in Birmingham 1873 - 1951)
- William Maving Gardner (1914 – 2000). Signature WG
- Ernest George Gillick (1874 – 1951)
- Mary Gaskell Gillick OBE (1881 – 1965)
- Samuel Grün
- Thomas Halliday (c. 1780–?)
- John Gregory Hancock (active in Birmingham 1775 – 1815)
- Ralph Heaton & Sons Signature H (Heaton's Mint), Birmingham
- John Henning (Scottish) (1771 – 1851)
- Michael Hibbit, (born 1947 in London, died 2009 in Seattle)
- Mathew Holland, of Bigbury Mint Ltd (Born 1963), British Art Medal Society Medallist, Bigbury Mint also award the Annual Student Medal Prize
- Thomas Wells Ingram (1799 Warwickshire – 1844 Birmingham, England)
- Christopher Ironside, OBE (1913 London, England – 1992 Winchester, Hampshire)
- Henry Kettle & Sons (active in Birmingham 1792 – 1830)
- George Kruger Grey (1880 London, England – 1943 Chichester West Sussex, England). Signature: GK
- Alphonse Legros (1837 – 1911). British Art Medal Society Medallist
- John Lobban (1919-1996) "one of Britain’s foremost numismatic artists" — ref British Art Medal Society (BAMS)
- Arthur Immanuel Loewental (1879 – 1964)
- Arnold Machin (1911 Stoke-on-Trent, Staffordshire – 1999 Eccleshall near Stoke-on-Trent, Staffordshire, England), Signature: RDM
- John Maine (born 1942). British Art Medal Society Medallist
- Raphael David Maklouf (born 1937 in Jerusalem, Israel)
- Maurice Frank Meers (1929 - 2012 Streetly, Staffordshire)
- Percy Metcalfe (1895 – 1970)
- George Mills (1792/3 – 1824)
- John Mills (1933-2023)
- Joseph Moore (1817-1892)
- Nichola Moss (born 1960). British Art Medal Society Medallist
- Philip R. Nathan (born 1941) Signature: PN
- Jane McAdam Freud (born 1958)
- Johann Rudolf Ochs (1704 Berne, Switzerland – 1788 London)
- John Ottley (active in Birmingham 1790 – 1850)
- Thomas Ottley (active in Birmingham 1852 – 1931)
- Martin Page. British Art Society (BAMS) Medallist
- Thomas Humphrey Paget, Sculptor, (1893 Watford, Hertfordshire near London, England – 1974 Sussex). Signature: HP
- Ronald Penell (born 1935). British Art Society (BAMS) Medallist
- John Phillp (1778 Falmouth, Cornwall – 1815 Birmingham). Artist at Boulton's Soho Mint since 1793.
- Francis Phillips
- Catherine Pilkington
- John Pinches (1916 – 2007)
- John Pinches Snr (1825 Birmingham – 1905 London)
- John Harvey Pinches (1852 – 1941)
- John Robert Pinches (1884 – 1968)
- Thomas Ryan Pinches (1825 Birmingham – ?)
- John Pingo (1738 – 1827)
- Lewis Pingo (1743 – 1830)
- Thomas Pingo Jr (1714 – 1776)
- Thomas Pingo Sr. (1688 – after 1743)
- Benedetto Pistrucci (1783 – 1855); became English Chief engraver
- Felicity Powell (1961-2015)
- Edward Carter Preston (1885-1965)
- Ian Rank-Broadley, coin designer (born 1952 in Walton-on-Thames, Surrey England). Signature: IRB
- Natasha Ratcliffe (born 1982). British Art Medal Society Medallist
- Sara Richards
- Michael Rizzello (1926 – 2004)
- John Emmanuel Roberts (1946 Neath, Glamorgan - 2002 Friston Forest, East Sussex)
- John Roettiers (1631 – 1703)
- Ronald Searle (1920-2011). British Art Medal Society Medallist
- Bernard Ralph Sindall (1925 Surbiton, Surrey – 1998)
- Danuta Soloweij-Wedderburn (born 1962). British Art Medal Society Medallist. Coin designer
- Jacqueline Stieger (born 1936). British Art Medal Society Medallist
- Thomas Stirling Lee (1857-1916). Sculptor, specialising in reliefs and portrait heads.
- John Sigismund Tanner (1705-1775)
- Avril Vaughan (1937-2008) Coin & Medal designer. British Art Medal Society Medallist
- Thomas Webb (fl. 1797 – 1830)
- Paul Vincze (1907 Galgagyörk, Hungary – 1994 Grasse, France)
- J.A. Wylie (active 1914 – 1940)
- David Wynne (1926 – 2014)
- Alfred Benjamin Wyon (1837 – 1884)
- Joseph Shepherd Wyon (1836 – 1873)
- Leonard Charles Wyon (1826 – 1891)
- Thomas Wyon the elder (1767 – 1830)
- Thomas Wyon the younger (1792 – 1817)
- William Wyon (1795 – 1851)

=== Bulgarian ===
- Blagovest Georgiev Apostolov (born 1953 Sofia)
- Alexander Haytov (born 1954)
- Sneschana Russewa-Hoyer (born 1953 Krushari)

=== Canadian ===
- Walter Seymour Allward (1876 – 1955)
- Patrick Brindley, Chief engraver Royal Canadian Mint ( – 1989 Ottawa). Signature: B
- Henry Birks (1840 – 1928)
- Paul Cederberg (1932 Toronto – 2014 Ottawa) Signature: PC
- Elizabeth Bradford Holbrook (1913 – 2009)
- Christian Cardell Corbet (born 1966)
- Emily S. Damstra (born 20th century last quarter)
- Ken Danby (1940 - 2007)
- Emanuel Otto Hahn (1881 Reutlingen (today Baden-Württemberg), Germany – 1957 Toronto, Canada)
- Georges Huel (1930 Gravelbourg, Saskatchewan – 2002 Montréal)
- John Jaciw (Graphic Designer, born 1932 Kolynci, Ukraine -)
- Orazio Lombardo (1926 Milan, Italy – ) founder of Lombardo Mint, a Mississauga Mint division
- R. Tait McKenzie (1867 – 1938)
- Walter Ott (1920 Kapfenberg, Styria – 2020 Ottawa)
- Dora de Pedery-Hunt (1913 – 2008)
- Walter Schluep (1931 San Feliu de Guixols, Spain - 2016 Montreal)
- Thomas Shingles (1903 – 1984)
- Raymond Taylor, Royal Canadian Mint Olympic coins designer (1931 Toronto - 2020 Scarborough, Ontario)
- Benjamin Trickett Mercer (born 1991)
- Leo Yerxa (1947 - 2017)

=== Costa Rican ===
- Juan (Johann) Barth (essayer San José mint, 1847–1864). Signature J.B.

=== Croatian ===
- Frano Menegello Dinčić (1900 – 1986)
- Ivo Kerdić (1881 – 1953)
- Francesco Laurana (c. 1430 – 1502)

=== Czech ===
- Jaroslav Brůha (1889 – 1969)
- Gregor Egerer (Bohemian) (Mint-master, Prague 1694 - 1710). Signature: G E
- Jiří Harcuba (1928 Harrachov – 2013 Prague)
- Jaroslav Horejc (1886 – 1983)
- Jaroslav F. Huta (born 1940 at Charvátská Nová Ves, Czechoslovakia)
- Zdeněk Kolarsky (born 1931 in Kostelec nad Orlicí, Bohemia)
- Mario Korbel (1882 – 1954)
- Miroslav Mlynář (born 1938)
- Josef Václav Myslbek (1848 – 1922)
- Věnoval Pichl (1741-1805)
- Marian Polonski (born 1933)
- Václav Adolf Kovanič (1911 - 1999)
- Lubomir Ruzicka (born 1938 in Vyškově, Moravia)
- Jan Solpera (1939 Hradec – )
- Otakar Španiel (Bohemian) (1881 – 1955)
- Ivan Strnad (1926 – 2005)

=== Danish ===
- Frode Bahnsen (1923-1983), chief medallist for the Royal Danish Mint
- Harald Conradsen (1817 – 1905) Signature: H·C
- Johannes Conradsen (1783 Vester Åby – 1856 Copenhagen) Signature: I.C.
- Johann Friedrich Freund (Mint-master in Altona, Schleswig-Holstein 1819 – 1856) Signature: FF, or IFF
- Gunnar Jensen (1863 – 1948) Signature: GJ
- Hans Peter Sophus Lindahl (1849 Køge-1935 Copenhagen)
- Anders Nyborg (born 1934 in Gentofte, Capital Region of Denmark)
- Peter Petersen (1810 – 1892)
- Jan Petersen (born (1945), chief medallist for the Royal Danish Mint
- Vilhelm Buchard Poulsen (Mint-master Royal Mint of Copenhagen 1893-1918), signature VBP
- Rikke Raben
- Harald Salomon (1900 – 1990)
- Anton Schultz (active in Copenhagen 1716 – 1724, from 1724 active in Moscow, died there 1736)
- Diderik Christian Andreas Svendsen, Mint-master in Copenhagen 1869 - 1893. Signature: CS
- Bertel Thorvaldsen (1770 – 1844)
- Hanne Varming (born 1939)

=== Dominican Republic ===
- Juan Medina (born 1948 Santo Domingo)

=== Dutch ===
- Hugo Laurens Adriaan van den Wall Bake (1856 Utrecht - 1909 Arnhem)
- Barend Christiaan van Calker (1738-1813)
- Floris de Cuyper (1875 – 1965)
- Bruno Ninaber van Eyben (born 1950 Boxtel)
- Dr Copius Hoitsema (1867 Groningen – 1958 Zuidlaren)
- Romeyn de Hooghe (1645 Amsterdam – 1708 Haarlem)
- Frederik Engel Jeltsema (1879 – 1971)
- Ludwig Jünger (1856 Neutitschein today Nový Jičín – 1906 Amsterdam)
- Johan Philip van der Kellen (1831 Utrecht - 1906 Baarn). Signature: VDK
- Eugène Lacomblé (1828 Brussels – 1905 Arnhem)
- Hendrix Lageman (1765 – 1816)
- Johannis Petrus Schouberg (1798 The Hague – 1864 Utrecht)
- Yman Dirk Christiaan Suermondt (1792 Rotterdam – 1871 Utrecht), mint-master in Utrecht 1815-1838.
- Willem Vis (1936 Leiden – 2007)
- Salomon Isaac de Vries (1816 The Hague – 1886 Amsterdam), signature: S. de Vries
- Ludwig Oswald Wenckebach (1895 – 1962)
- Johann Cornelius Wienecke (1872 – 1945)

=== Estonian ===
- Günther Reindorff (1889, Saint Petersburg – 1974, Tallinn)

=== Finnish ===
- Aarre Aaltonen (1889-1980). Coin design OLYMPIA HELSINKI 1952
- Olof Eriksson (1911-1987)
- Heikki Häiväoja (1929-2019)
- Raimo Heino (1932 Helsinki – 1995 Helsinki)
- Eila Hiltunen (1922 – 2003)
- Pertti Kalervo Mäkinen (1952 Tyrvää -)
- Kimmo Pyykkö(born 1940)
- Gerda Franziska Qvist (1883 – 1957)
- Kauko Räsänen (1926 – 2015)
- Walter Runeberg (1838 – 1920)
- Matti Visanti (1885 – 1957). Coin design OLYMPIA HELSINKI 1952

=== French ===
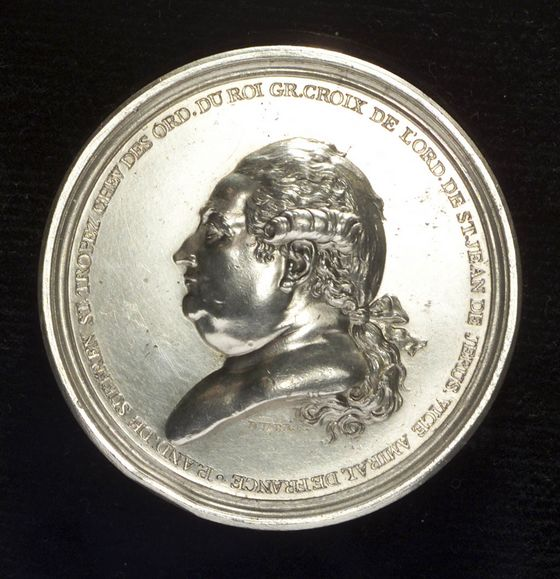
Medal commissioned from Augustin Dupré and issued in 1784 by the American republic to honor Admiral Suffren

- Henri Émile Allouard (1844 Paris – 1929)
- Léonce Alloy (fl. 1899 – 1942)
- Charles Altorffer (1809 Strasbourg – 1887 Paris)
- René Jean Louis Andréi (1906-1987)
- Jean-Bertrand Andrieu (1761 – 1822)
- Arthus-Bertrand (founded in Paris in 1803)
- Roger B. Baron (1907 – 1994)
- Albert Désiré Barre (1818 – 1878)
- Jean-Auguste Barre (1811 – 1896)
- Jacques-Jean Barre (also often styled "Jean-Jacques Barre", 1793 – 1855)
- Anna Bass (1876-1961)
- René Baudichon (1878 – 1963)
- Léon Georges Baudry (1898 – 1978)
- Lucien Georges Bazor (1889 – 1974)
- Edmond Henri Becker (1871 – 1971)
- Paul Belmondo (1898 – 1982)
- Raoul René Alphonse Bénard (1881 – 1961)
- Arthus Claude Bertrand (mint founded 1803 in Paris) signature: A. Bertrand
- Louis Charles Beylard (1843 – 1925)
- Roger Bezombes(1913 – 1994)
- Jane L. Blanchot (1884-1979)
- Léon-Alexandre Blanchot (1868 – 1947)
- Édouard Pierre Blin (1877 Chartres - 1946 Paris)
- Max Blondat (1872 – 1925) He is a sculptor, for medallist
- Michel Eugène Blondelet (1840 Paris – 1929 Paris)
- Émile André Boisseau (1842 – 1923)
- Alfred Borrel (1836 – 1927)
- Louis-Alexandre Bottée (1852 – 1940)
- Maximilien Louis Bourgeois (1839 – 1901)
- Brassaï (Gyula Halász) (1899 – 1984)
- Nicolas-Guy-Antoine Brenet (1773 – 1846)
- Nicholas Briot (1579 – 1646)
- Laurent Burger (1897 – 1969)
- Gérard Buquoy (Chief engraver of La Monnaie de Paris 2001) (born 1944)
- Jean Marie Camus (1877 Clermont-Ferrand – 1955 Paris)
- Armand Auguste Caqué (1793 Saintes – 1881 Paris)
- Claude Cardot (born 1934 Saint-Etienne)
- Lucien Jean Henri Cariat (1874 – 1925)
- Francis Cartaux (active in Paris from the end of the 19th to the start of the 20th centuries)
- Louis-Félix Chabaud (1824 – 1902)
- Jules-Clément Chaplain (1839 – 1909)
- Pierre Puvis de Chavannes (1824 – 1898)
- Raymond Corbin (1907 – 2002)
- Jean-Louis Chorel (born 1875, year of death unknown) medallist?
- François André Clémencin (born 1878, year of death unknown) medallist?
- Robert Cochet (1903 – 1988)
- Georges Contaux (1891-1984)
- Raymond Corbin (1907 – 2002)
- Marie Alexandre-Lucien Coudray (1864 Paris – 1932)
- Marcel Courbier (1898 – 1976)
- Fabienne Courtiade (born 1970 in Villeneuve-Saint-Georges (Val-de-Marne))
- Robert Coutre (born 1915)
- Léopold Georges Crouzat (1904 – 1976)
- Paul-Marcel Dammann (1885 – 1939?)
- Jean-Baptiste Daniel-Dupuis (1849 – 1899)
- Joseph Dantzell (1805 Lyons – 1877 Paris)
- Pierre-Victor Dautel (1873 – 1954?)
- Georgette Daveline (1902-?)
- Pierre-Jean David d'Angers (1788 – 1856)
- Louis Auguste Ernest Davin (1866 Saint-Michel-en-Beaumont – 1937 Grenoble)
- Charles-Jean-Marie Degeorge (1837 – 1888)
- Raymond Henri Philippe Delamarre (1890 – 1986)
- Maurice Delannoy (1885 – 1972)
- Jean Delpech
- Jean-Marie Delpech (1866 Banios – 1929)
- André Deluol(1909-2003) medallist?
- Dominique-Vivant Denon (1747 – 1825)
- Alexis Joseph Depaulis (1792 – 1867)
- Albin François de Possesse (born 1888, year of death unknown)
- Jean-Pierre Casimir de Marcassus, Baron de Puymaurin (1757 – 1841)
- Alphonse Desaide (1850-1911)
- Jules Desbois (1851 – 1935)
- Léon Julien Deschamps (1860 – 1928)
- Joseph François Domard (1792 – 1858)
- Jean-Baptiste Émile Dropsy (1848 – 1923)
- Henri Dropsy (1885 – 1969)
- Alphée Dubois (1831 Paris – 1905 Clamart)
- Henri Alfred Auguste Dubois (1859 – 1943)
- Joseph Eugène Dubois (1795 – 1863)
- Thérèse Dufresne (1937 Madagascar - 2010)
- Auguste Dujardin (1847 Paris - 1925 Essey-lès-Nancy)
- Rambert Dumarest (1750 – 1806)
- Augustin Dupré (1748 – 1833)
- Georges Dupré (1869 – 1909)
- Guillaume Dupré (1574 – 1643)
- Amédée Pierre Durand (1789 Paris – 1873)
- Pierre-Simon-Benjamin Duvivier (1730 – 1819)
- Johanna Ebertz (1944 Wetzlar, Germany – )
- Claude Emmel
- Étienne Victor Exbrayat (1879 – 1914)
- Richard-Camille Fath (1900 – 1952) Signature: FATH
- Charles-Maurice Favre-Bertin (1887 Paris - 1960 Clichy)
- Daniel Flourat (1928 Paris – 1968 Bry-sur-Marne)
- Charles Forster (19th century)
- Édouard Fraisse (1880 – 1945)
- Jean Gallo (born 1916)
- André Léon Galtié (1908 – 1998)
- Hippolyte Marius Galy (1847-1929)
- Jacques-Édouard Gatteaux (1788 – 1881)
- Raymond Gayrard (1777 – 1858)
- Lucien Gibert (1904 Saint-Etienne – 1988)
- Ferdinand Gilbault (1837 – 1926)
- Émile Gilioli (1911 – 1977)
- Léon Gobert (1869 – 1935) medallist?
- Paul Grandhomme (1851 Paris – 1944 Saint-Briac-sur-Mer, Ille-et-Vilaine, France)
- Geneviève Granger (1877 – 1967)
- Henri-Léon Gréber (1855 – 1941)
- René Grégoire (1871 – 1945)
- Hélène Guastalla (1903 Paris – 1983 Nice)
- Paul Louis Guilbert (1886 - 1952) medallist?
- Octave Denis Victor Guillonnet (1872 – 1967)
- Georges Guiraud (1901 – 1989)
- Aleth Jeanne Antoinette Guzman-Nageotte (1904 – 1978)
- Emmanuel Hannaux (1855 – 1934)
- Jacques Hardy
- Josette Hébert-Coëffin (1906 – 1973)
- Auguste Albert Herbemont (1874 Paris - 1953)
- Benoit Lucien Hercule (1846 – 1913)
- Henri Théodore Martin Herluison (1835 – 1905)
- Léon Auguste César Hodebert (1854? – 1914) medallist?
- Roland Irolla (born 1935)
- Albert de Jaeger (1908 Roubaix - 1992 Paris)
- Romain-Vincent Jeuffroy (1749 - 1826)
- Joaquin Jimenez (born 1956)
- Jean Joachim (1905 Levallois-Perret – 1990 Paris)
- Raymond Joly (1911 Paris – 2006)
- Laurent Jorio (1973 Bouaké, Ivory Coast)
- Sylvain Kinsburger (1855 – 1935)
- Pierre-François-Henri Labrouste (1801 – 1875)
- Abel Lafleur (1875 – 1953)
- Jean Lagrange (1831 – 1908)
- René J. Lalique (1860 – 1945)
- Léon Lamer (1889 – 1926)
- Raoul-Eugène Lamourdedieu (1877 – 1953)
- Alfred-Désiré Lanson (1851 – 1898)
- André-Marie Lavrillier (1885 – 1958)
- Gaston Lavrillier (1890 – 1958)
- Jean Le Blanc (1677 – 1749)
- Arthur Jacques Le Duc (1848 – 1918)
- Hippolyte-Jules Lefèbvre (1863 – 1935)
- Jules-Prosper Joseph Marie Edmond Legastelois (1855 Paris – 1931)
- Alphonse Legros (1837 – 1911)
- René Leleu (1911 – 1984)
- Georges Henri Lemaire (1853 – 1914)
- Pierre-Charles Lenoir (1878 – 1953)
- Claude Lesot (1933 – )
- Jules-Aurèle L'Hommeau (1867-1938)
- Honoré Delongueil (1818 Paris – 1889 Thiais)
- Marcel Prosper Lordonnois (1876 Paris – 1926)
- Auguste Maillard (1864 – 1944)
- Claude-Léon Mascaux (1882 – 1965)
- André Arthur Paul Massoulle (1851 Epernay – 1901 Paris)
- Louis Maubert (1875 Paris – 1949 Nice)
- Jean Mauger (1648 – 1712)
- Marius-Jean-Antonin Mercié (1845 – 1916)
- J.(Giacomo Jaques) Merculiano (1859 – 1935)
- René Mérelle (1903 – 1990)
- Louis Merley (1815 – 1883)
- Auguste-François Michaut (1786 – 1879)
- Gustave Frédéric Michel (1851 – 1924)
- Émile Adolphe Monier (1883 – 1970)
- Jean-Pierre Montagny (1789 – 1862)
- Blanche Adèle Moria (1859 – 1927)
- Pierre-Alexandre Morlon (1878 – 1951)
- Marie-Madeleine Moufle, engraver (born 1947), signature M M MOUFLE
- Mélanie "Anie" Mouroux (1887-1978)
- Louis Muller (1902 – 1957)
- Henri Naudé (1859 Brégnier-Cordon, Ain – ?)
- Henri Éduard Navarre (1885 Paris – 1971 Paris)
- Paul François Niclausse (1879 – 1958)
- Alexandre Olivier (1527 Paris – 1607 Paris)
- Eugène André Oudiné (1810 – 1887) Signature: E.A. Oudiné
- Henri Auguste Jules Patey (1855 – 1930)
- Louis Patriarche (1872 – 1955)
- Jean William Henri Pécou (1854 Bordeaux - 1920)
- Raymond "Ray" Pelletier (1907 – 1958)
- Adolphe Penin (1888 – 1985)
- Ludovic Penin (1830 – 1868)
- Marius Penin (1807 – 1883)
- Paul Penin (1921 – 2017 Lyon)
- Victor Peter (1840 – 1918)
- Henri Marius Petit (1913 Paris – 2009 Boulogne-Billancourt)
- Jean Claude Petit (1819 Besançon - 1903 Paris)
- Louis-Michel Petit (1791 – 1844)
- Émile Edmond Peynot (1850 – 1932)
- Charles-Louis Picaud (1855 Lyon - 1934)
- Charles Philippe Germain Aristide Pillet (1869 – 1960)
- Pierre Marie Poisson (1876 – 1953)
- Daniel Ponce (1933 – 2017)
- Hubert Ponscarme (1827 – 1903)
- Pierre Pradeilhes (1919 – 2003)
- Auguste Préault (1809 Paris – 1879)
- Victor-Émile Prouvé (1858 – 1943)
- Georges-Henri Prud'homme (1873 – 1947)
- Denis Fernand Py (1887 – 1949)
- Madeleine Pierre Quérolle (born 1914)
- Marcel Renard (1893 – 1974)
- Dr Paul M. L. Pierre Richer (1849 – 1933)
- Georges Ridet (1906 – 1967)
- André Adolphe Rivaud (1892 Paris – 1951)
- Adolphe Rivet (1855 Périgueux – 1925 Gentilly (Seine))
- Pierre Roche (1855 – 1922)
- Pierre Rodier (1939 Paris – ) Signature: A bee.
- Charles Norbert Roettiers (1720 – 1772)
- Joseph-Charles Roettiers (1691/2 – 1779)
- Émile Rogat (1770 – 1852)
- Louis-Oscar Roty (1846 – 1911)
- Émile Rousseau (1927 Paris - 2010 Paris)
- Charles René de Paul de Saint-Marceaux (1845 – 1915)
- André Pierre Salès (born 1860 Perpignan, year of death unknown)
- Sylvain Salières (1865, Escorneboeuf, Gers - 1920 Pittsburgh, USA)
- André Pierre Schwab (1883 Nancy – 1969)
- Georges Simon (1906 – 1982)
- Moïse Stern (1826 Haguenau, Alsace - 1915 Paris), owner-director of Graveur Stern)
- René Stern (1862 Paris - 1940), owner-director of Graveur Stern
- Gérard Suzeau-Villeneuve (1938 - )
- Paulin Tasset (1839 – 1921)
- Maurice René G. Thénot (1893 – 1963)
- Gravure des Métaux Thévenon & Cie (1893 – 1963)
- Nicolas-Pierre Tiolier (1784 Paris – 1853 Paris) Signature: N. Tiolier
- Pierre-Joseph Tiolier (1763 – 1819)
- Raymond Tschudin (1916 – 1998)
- Pierre Turin (1891 – 1968)
- Georges Urbain (1872 – 1938) medallist?
- André Vauthier-Galle (1818 – 1899)
- Antoine Vechte (1800 – 1868 Avallon, Burgundy)
- Frédéric-Charles-Victor de Vernon (1858 – 1912)
- Adrien Veyrat (1803 – 1883)
- Élie Jean Vézien (1890 – 1982)
- Charles Louis Eugène Virion (1865 – 1946)
- Jean Warin, or Varin (1604 – 1672)
- Hubert Yencesse (1900 – 1987) medallist?
- Ovide Yencesse (1869 – 1947)

=== German ===
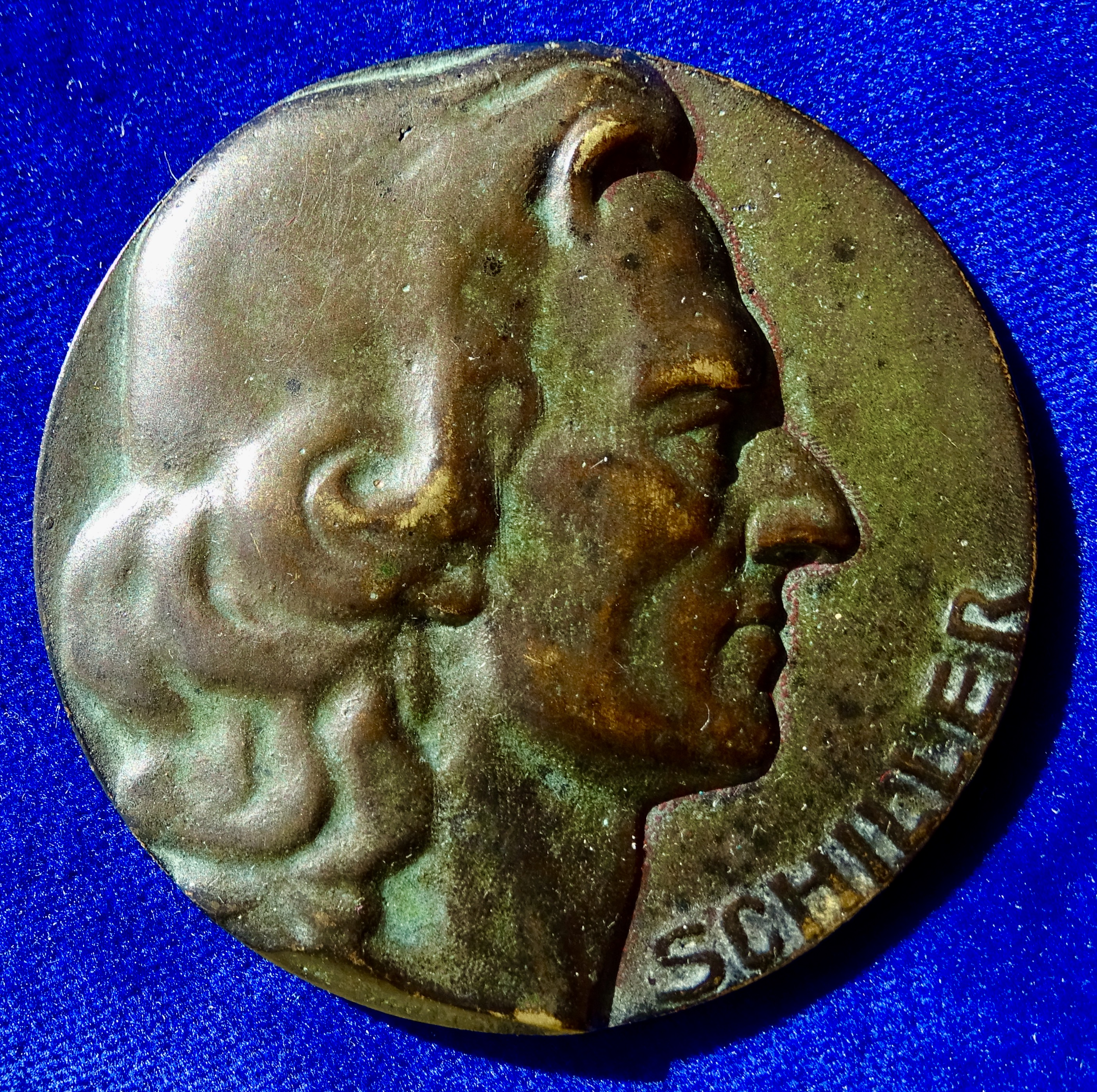
1909 medal by Karl Dautert, 150th birthday of Friedrich Schiller, obverse

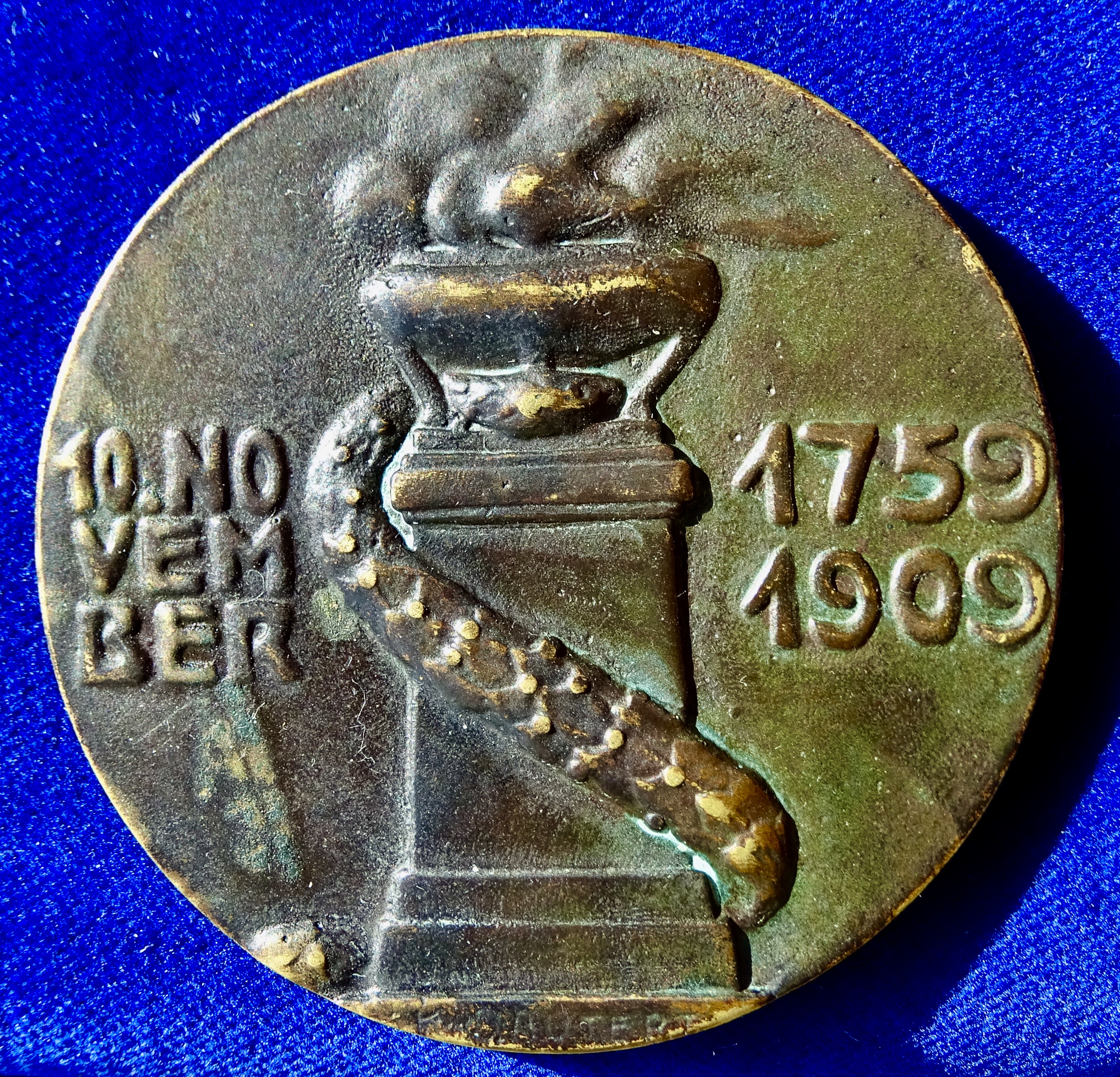
The reverse of this medal

- Abraham Abramson (1754 – 1811)
- Friedrich Johannes Maximilian "Max" Barduleck (1846 – 1923)
- Ernst Barlach (1870 – 1938)
- Egon Beckenbauer (1913 – 1999)
- Karl Wilhelm Becker (1772 – 1830)
- Gertrud Bergmann (1910 – 1985)
- Josef Bernhart (1883 – 1967)
- Axel Bertram (1936-2019)
- Johann Blum (1599 – after 1689)
- Hans Biener (1556 - 1604), Mint-master in Dresden. Signature HB monogram.
- Alois Börsch (1855 – 1923)
- Rudolf Bosselt (1871 – 1938)
- Ferdinand von Brakenhausen (1835 – 1895)
- Friedrich Brehmer (1815 – 1889)
- Bodo Broschat (1959 Neuruppin – )
- Philipp Christian Bunsen (1729 – 1790)
- Hans Karl Burgeff (1928 – 2005)
- Ludwig Burger (1825 – 1884)
- Georg Christoph Busch (died 1811) Mint-master in Ratisbon, Bavaria, 1773 – 1809. Signature B
- František Chochola, (1943 Kolín, Bohemia – 2022 Hamburg)
- Fritz Christ (1866 – 1906)
- Sebastian Dadler (1586 – 1657)
- Maximilian Dasio (1865 – 1954)
- Karl Dautert (1875 Frankfurt am Main – 1944/45 Berlin)
- Cirillo Dell'Antonio (1876 – 1971)
- Gottlob August Dietelbach (1806 Stetten im Remstal - 1870 Stuttgart). Signature: D
- Wolfgang Doehm (1934-2010)
- Johann Veit Döll (1750 – 1835)
- Oskar Döll (1886 – 1914)
- Dietrich Dorfstecher, (1933 Groß Miltzow-Kreckow – 2011 Berlin)
- Friedrich Drake (1805 – 1882)
- Lissy Eckart-Aigner (1891 – 1974)
- Paul Effert (born 1931 in Düsseldorf)
- Benno Elkan (1877 – 1960)
- Veitel Heine Ephraim (1703 Berlin – 1775)
- Bruno Eyermann (1888 – 1955)
- Angelica Facius (1806 Weimar – 1887)
- Friedrich Wilhelm Facius (1764 Greiz - 1843 Weimar)
- Reinhold Felderhoff (1865 – 1919)
- August Fischer (1805 – 1866)
- Johann Karl Fischer (1802 – 1865)
- Wilfried Fitzenreiter (1932 – 2008)
- Else Fürst (1873 – 1943)
- Werner Godec (born 1946)
- Bernd Goebel (born 1942)
- Karl Goetz (1875 – 1950)
- Theodor von Gosen (1873 – 1943)
- Friedrich Hermann Werner Graul (1905 – 1984)
- Hugo Grünthal, owner of Robert Ball Nachf. Berlin, (1869 Beuthen – 1943 Berlin)
- Arthur K. Grupp, (1929 Plochingen – )
- Heinrich Gube (∗ 1802 Breslau (Prussia),† 1848 St. Petersburg)
- Ludwig Habich (born 1872, year of death unknown)
- Jan Hansky (1925 – 2004)
- Georg Hautsch (1659 Nürnberg – 1745 Vienna)
- Reinhart Heinsdorff (1923 – 2002)
- Emil Helfricht (1878 Gotha – 1908 Gotha, Thuringia)
- Johann Georg Hille (1772 - 1816 Frankfurt am Main)
- Johann Heinrich Hille (1737 Kleinern-Edertal - 1802 Frankfurt am Main)
- Lorenz Hoffstätter (1904 – 1787)
- Rudi Högner (1907 – 1995)
- Ludwig Hohlwein (1874 – 1949)
- Albert Holl (1890 – 1970)
- Martin Holtzhey (1697 – 1764)
- Friedrich Wilhelm Hörnlein, (1873 – 1945)
- Hermann Hosaeus, (1875 – 1958)
- Heinz Hoyer, (born 1949 Elxleben)
- August Hummel (1866 – 1933)
- Johann Ludwig Jachtmann (1776 - 1842)
- Anton Zvone Jezovsek (born 1935 Slovenia, died 2017)
- Horst Rainer Kerger (born 1943 Düsseldorf) Signature: HRK monogram
- Richard Klein (1890 – 1967)
- Hubert Klinkel (born 1939 Cochem, Mosel)
- Anton Friedrich König (1756 – 1838)
- Friedrich Anton König (1794-1844)
- Helmut König (1934-2017)
- Heinrich Körner (1908 – 1993 Esslingen)
- Karl Reinhard Krüger (1794 Dresden – 1879 Dresden). Signature: R. K.
- Christian Friedrich Krull (1748 Hessen am Fallstein – 1787 Braunschweig)
- Bruno Kruse (1855 Hamburg – 1934 Berlin)
- Rudolf Kube (active in Berlin 1897 - 1918)
- Reinhard Kullrich (1869 – 1947)
- Kunst- und Glockengießerei Lauchhammer (founded 1725 in Lauchhammer)
- Ludwig Christoph Lauer (1817 – 1873)
- Hans Lauffer (1584 - 1632 Nuremberg)
- Rolf Lederbogen (1928 – 2012)
- Arthur Lewin-Funcke (1866 - 1937)
- Gerhard Lichtenfeld (1921 – 1978)
- Daniel Friedrich Loos (1735 Altenburg an der Pleisse – 1819 Berlin)
- Friedrich Wilhelm Loos (about 1767 Magdeburg – after 1816 before 1819)
- Gottfried Bernhard Loos (1773 Berlin – 1843)
- Heinrich Lorenz (1810 – 1888)
- Johann Jacob Lorenz (1845 – 1887)
- Valentin Maler (about 1540 – 1603)
- Prof. Rudolf Mayer (1846 Nýdek - 1916 Karlsruhe)
- Wilhelm Mayer (born in 1840, year of death unknown)
- Heinrich Missfeldt (1872 Kiel – 1945 Torgau)
- Heinrich Moshage (1896 – 1968)
- Georg Mueller, Sculptor of the Munich Secession, (1880 Munich – 1952 München)
- Philipp Heinrich Müller (1654 – 1719)
- August Neuss (medallist in Augsburg 1840 – 1870)
- Johann Jakob Neuss (1770 – 1847)
- Rolf Nida-Rümelin (1910 – 1996)
- Hermann Noack (1867 – 1941)
- August Friedrich von Nordheim (1813 Heinrichsdorf bei Suhl, Thuringia – 1884 Frankfurt am Main, Germany)
- Karl Ulrich Nuss (born 1943 Stuttgart)
- Otto Oertel (died in 1892)
- Louis Oppenheim (1879 – 1936)
- Otto Placzek (1884 Berlin – 1968 Berlin)
- Christoph Carl Pfeuffer (1801 – 1861)
- Erich Ott (born 1944 Oberammergau, Bavaria)
- Carl Poellath (1777 Landshut – 1834)
- Leonhard Posch (1750 – 1831)
- Robert Propf (1910 – 1986)
- Carl Radnitzky (1818 – 1901)
- Alfred Raum (1872 – 1935)
- Johann Christian Reich (1740 – 1814)
- Heinz Rodewald (1932 Zduńska Wola, Poland – 1993 Berlin) Signature: R
- Gerhard Rommel (1934 – 2014)
- Karl Roth (1900 – 1967)
- Wilhelm von Rümann (1850 – 1906)
- Sneschana Russewa-Hoyer (born 1953 Krushari)
- Bruno Schäfer (1883 Leipzig – 1957 Frankfurt am Main)
- Heinz Schiestl (1867 Zell am Ziller, Austria – 1940 Würzburg) Designer of German Notgeld
- Emil Schilling (1864-1933)
- Karl Friedrich Schinkel (1781 – 1841)
- Johann Wilhelm Schlemm Mint-master at Clausthal 1753 – 1788†. Signature: I.W.S
- Christian Schnitzspahn (1829 – 1877)
- Ernst Schomer (1915 – 2005)
- Kurt Schumacher (1905 – 1942)
- Siegmund Schütz (1906 Dessau – 1998 Dessau)
- Tobias Schwab (1887 – 1947)
- Heinrich von Schwabe (1847 – 1907)
- Hans Schwegerle (1882 – 1950)
- Renée Sintenis (1888 – 1965)
- Peter Strang (born 1936 in Dresden)
- Paul Sturm (1859 Leipzig, Saxony – 1936 Jena, Germany)
- Alfred Thiele (1886 – 1957)
- Diedrich Uhlhorn (1764 – 1837)
- Carl Vezerfi-Clemm (1939 – 2012)
- Alfred Vocke (1886 – 1944)
- Georg Vogt (1881 – 1956) Signature: G·V
- Otto Vogt (1911 Schwäbisch Gmünd – 1981 Ellwangen)
- Carl Friedrich Voigt (1800 – 1874)
- Joseph Wackerle (1890 – 1950)
- Heinrich Maria Waderé (1865 – 1950)
- Heidi Wagner-Kerkhof (born 1945 in Spremberg)
- Doris Waschk-Balz (born 1942 in Berlin)
- Leopold Weber (see Lippold Wefer)
- Lippold Wefer (Mint Master in Clausthal, Harz, 1640 – 1674)
- Gustav Weidanz (1888 – 1970)
- Emil Weigand (1837 – 1906)
- Emil Rudolf Weiss (1875 – 1942)
- Richard Martin Werner (1903 – 1949)
- Franz Wilhelm(1846 – 1938)
- Susanne Wimmelmann (1926 – 2015)
- Wilkens & Söhne (established 1810 by Martin Heinrich Wilkens)
- Albert Wolff (1814 – 1892)
- Albert Moritz Wolff (1854 – 1923)
- Arnold Zadikow (1884 – 1943)
- Christian Zollmann (Medallist and mint engraver at Wiesbaden 1845 – 1859) Signature: C. ZOLLMANN

=== Greek ===
- Georgios Jakobides (1853 – 1932)
- Giorgos Stamatopoulos (1963 Athens – )

=== Hungarian ===
- Tamás Asszonyi (born 1942)
- Eszter Balás (born 1947)
- Lajos Berán (1882 Budapest – 1943 Budapest)
- György Bognár (born 1944 Budapest) Signature: BGY
- Miklós Borsos (1906 – 1990)
- Jenő Bory (1879 – 1959)
- Barna Búza (1910 – 2010)
- Tibor Budahelyi (born 1945)
- Sándor Csepregi (born 1950)
- Róbert Csíkszentmihály (born 1940 Budapest)
- Tibor Csiky (1932 – 1989)
- Viktória Csúcs (1934 Kiskunhalas – 1993) Signature: CSV
- Antal Czinder (born 1937)
- István Béla Farkas (1915 – 2005)
- Béni Ferenczy (1890 – 1967)
- Ferenc Friedrich (born 1946)
- Mihály Fritz (born 1947)
- Gábor Gáti (born 1937)
- István Iván (1905 Szombathely – 1967 Budapest)
- Gyula Halász (1899 – 1984)
- György Holdas (born 1944)
- János Kalmár (born 1952)
- György Kiss (1943-2016)
- András Kiss Nagy (1930 – 1997)
- János Konyorcsik (1926 – 2010)
- József Kótai (born 1940 Sopron). Signature KJ
- László Kutas (born 1936)
- András Lapis (born 1942 Kecskemét, Hungary)
- Roland Ferenc Lieb (born 1976)
- Erika Ligeti (1934 – 2004)
- Mária Lugossy (1950-2012)
- Gyula Murányi (1881 – 1920)
- Pál Patzo (1886 – 1945)
- József Reményi (1887 – 1977)
- E. Tamás Soltra (born 1955)
- Tamás Somogyi (born 1950)
- György Szabó (born 1947)
- László Szlávics, Jr. (born 1959)
- László Szunyogh (born 1956)
- Enikő Szöllőssy (born 1939)
- Eduard Telcs (1872 Baja, Hungary - 1948 Budapest)
- Endre András Tornay (1949 – 2008)
- Sándor Tóth (1939-2019) Signature: TS
- Carl Vezerfi-Clemm (1939 – 2012)
- Tamás Vígh (1926-2010)
- Fülöp Zoltán (1951 Budapest – 2004 Budapest). Monogram "FZ"
- Képíró Zoltán (1944 Budapest – 1981 Budapest). Monogram "KZ"
- Ildikó Zsemlye (born 1969)

=== Irish ===
- Gabriel Hayes
- Jarlath Fabian Hayes

=== Israeli ===
- Zvi Narkiss (1921 Botoșani, Romania - 2010)
- Reuven Rubin (1893 – 1974)
- Eliezer Weishoff (born 1938)

=== Italian ===
- Giovanni Guido Agrippa (c. 1501)
- Costantino Affer (1906 Milano – 1987 Milano, Italy), Designer. Signature: COST· AFFER
- Pietro Annigoni (1910 – 1988)
- Donnino Bentelli (1807 – 1885)
- Antonio Berti (1904 San Pietro a Sieve – 1990 Sesto Fiorentino, Italy)
- Francesco Bianchi (1842 Rome – 1918 Rome)
- Bini Bino (1916 Florence - 2007 Florence)
- Floriano Bodini (1933 – 2005)
- Egidio Boninsegna (1868 Milan - 1929 Milan)
- Francesco Broggi (died in 1857)
- Camello (surname of Vittore Gambello)
- Pietro Canonica (1869 – 1959)
- Angelo Cappuccio (1855 Milan - 1918)
- Maria Angela Cassol (born 1956 in Nettuno, Province Rome) Signature: MAC
- Giannino Castiglioni (1884 Milan – 1971 Lierna, Como)
- Vincenzo Catenacci (1786 – 1855)
- Giuseppe Cerbara (1770 – 1856)
- Nicola Cerbara (1796 – 1869)
- Pietro Cinganelli
- Maria Carmela Colaneri (born 1963 Rome)
- Luigi Cossa (1789 – 1867)
- Laura Cretara (born 1939 in Rome)
- Eugenio Driutti (born 1949 Tarcento)
- Antonio Fabris (1792 – 1865)
- Giuseppe Ferraris (1791 Torino – 1869) Signature: F·
- Filarete (about 1400 – 1469)
- Ettore Lorenzo Frapiccini (born 1957 in Buenos Aires)
- Pietro Giampaoli (1898 Urbignacco di Buja, Province of Udine, Italy – 1998 Rome)
- Ettore Galli (1811 – 1841)
- Luigi Giorgi (1848 Lucca – 1912 Rome)
- Stefano Girola
- Giuseppe Girometti (1780 – 1851)
- Pietro Girometti (1811 – 1859)
- Tommaso Gismondi (1906 Anagni, Province Frosinone, Italy – 2003 Anagni)
- Emilio Greco (1923 Catania, Sicily – 1995 Rome)
- Alberto Hamerani (1620 – 1677)
- Giovanni Martino Hamerani (1646 – 1705)
- Ottone Hamerani (1694 – 1768)
- Gioacchino Hamerani (1766 – 1797)
- Giovanni Hamerani (1774 – 1846)
- Stabilimento Stefano Johnson (active 1836 - 2019)
- Michele Laudicina
- Francesco Laurana (c. 1430 – 1502)
- Amedeo Lavy (c. 1770 – 1826)
- Leone Leoni (1509 – 1590)
- Lodovico Leoni (1531 – 1606)
- Daniela Longo (born 1968)
- Luigi Mainoni (died in 1853)
- Giuseppe Malavasi (died in 1855)
- Luigi Manfredini (1771 – 1840)
- Roberto Mauri (born 1949 in Rome)
- Tommaso Mercandetti (1758 – 1821)
- J.(Giacomo Jaques) Merculiano (1859 – 1935)
- Aurelio Mistruzzi (1880 – 1960)
- Claudia Momoni (born 1963 Rome)
- Guerrino Mattia Monassi 1918 Buja, Italy – 1981 Zingonia, near Bergamo, Italy
- Attilio Silvio Mottii (1867 – 1935)
- Vittorio Nesti
- Giovanni Pasinati (born 1755, year of death unknown)
- Giuseppe Pasinati (1756 – 1829)
- Salvator Passamonti
- Domenico Perger Chief-engraver Naples Mint 1760 - 1820
- Uliana Pernazza (born 1959)
- Giuseppe Fortunato Pirrone (1898 Borgetto (Palermo) – 1978 Rome)
- Pisanello (1395 – 1455)
- Domenico Poggini (1520 – 1590)
- Victor de Pol (1865 Venice – 1925 Buenos Aires)
- Giovanni Pietro de Pomis (ca.1565 or 1569/70 – 6 March 1633)
- Francesco Putinati (c. 1775 – 1848)
- Giuseppe Romagnoli (1872 Bologna – 1966 Rome)
- Orietta Rossi (born 1968 Rome)
- Enrico Saroldi (1878 – 1954)
- Gregorio Sciltian (1900 – 1985)
- Luciana De Simoni (born 1957)
- Filippo Speranza (1848 San Martino al Cimino – 1903 Rome)
- Niccolò di Forzore Spinelli (1430 Arezzo – 1514 Florence)
- Roberto Terracini, Sculptor, (1900 Torino – 1976 Torino)
- Luigi Teruggi Sculptor (born 1934 Fontaneto d'Agogna) Signature: LT
- Gabriella Titotto Sculptor (born 1970 Rome)
- Jacopo da Trezzo (c. 1515 or 1519 – 1589), or Jacometrezo in Spain. Born in Italy, moved to Spain
- Girolamo Vassallo (1771 – 1819)
- Goffredo Verginelli (1911 – 1972)
- Guido Veroi (1926 Rome – 2013 Rome)
- Giovan Battista Vighi (1774 Parma – 1849)
- Jorio Vivarelli Sculptor (1922 Fognano, near Pistoia, Italy – 2008 Pistoia)
- Bonfiglio Zaccagnini (1793 – 1867)
- Gaetano Zapparelli (1792 – 1863)

=== Japanese ===
- Shigeo Fukuda (1932 Tokyo – 2009 Tokyo)

=== Latvian ===
- Jānis Tilbergs (1880 Riga, Russian Empire – 1972 Riga, Latvian SSR)
- Rihards Zariņš (1869 Kocēni, Latvia – 1939 Riga)

=== Lebanese ===
- Paul Koroleff (1896 St Petersburg, Russia – 1992 Beirut, Lebanon)

=== Lithuanian ===
- Petras Henrikas Garška (born 1933 Gyliai, Kaunas County, Lithuania)
- Juozas Kalinauskas (born 1935)
- Juozas Zikaras (1881 – 1944)

=== Luxembourg ===
- Charlotte Engels (1920 – 1993)
- Yvette Gastauer-Claire (born 1957 Esch-sur-Alzette)
- Edmond Goergen (1914 Steinsel-Müllendorf – 2000 Luxembourg)
- Julien Lefèvre (1907 Esch-Uelzecht – 1984 Luxembourg)
- Nina Lefèvre, née Kestler (1904 Tashkent – 1981 Luxembourg)
- Auguste Trémont (1892 – 1980)

=== Monégasque ===
- Pierre Lovy

=== New Zealand ===
- Reginald George James Berry OBE (1906 London-Dulwich – 1979 Auckland, New Zealand) Signature: JB
- William Rose Bock (1847 – 1932)
- G. Coates & Co. Christchurch (Established by Giles Coates 1851 in Nelson, and removed 1861 to Christchurch). Mint of the award medal for the New Zealand Interprovincial Exhibition 1872 Christchurch.
- Robert Maurice Conly (1920 Dunedin – 1995 Waikanae)
- Harry Dansey MBE (1920 Auckland – 1979 Auckland, New Zealand)
- Max Elbe (Engraver Centennial Medal 1971 Auckland City, New Zealand)
- Peter Featherstone (1951 Waiuku -) Signature: P F Designer of the New Zealand Leprosy Mission Centennial Medal 1974
- Stephen J. Fuller, numismatic designer, and illustrator in Wellington. Designer of the first New Zealand coins of King Charles III.
- David Hakaraia Wellington. Designer of NZ coins. (born 1977 at Tokoroa, New Zealand)
- Thomas Hugh Jenkin (born 1899 Surrey, England)
- Sacha Lees (1977 Greymouth - )
- Saint Andrew Matautia, NZ Post Wellington (born 1984 in Apia, Samoa), designer of the New Zealand 2020 Rowi Kiwi coins.
- Michael McHalick Wellington, coin designer around 2000 at the Reserve Bank of New Zealand
- Leonard Cornwall Mitchell (1901 Wellington, New Zealand - 1971)
- Hagbarth Ernest Möller (1870 Dunedin – 1936 Dunedin, New Zealand)
- Dave Martin Robertson (coin designer since 2011)
- John Shier, Jeweller (1836 Glasgow - 1923 Christchurch)
- Frederick Charles William Staub (1919 – 2012) Signature: FS
- Michel Tuffery (Artist in Wellington, NZ coin design 2012 "Friendship New Zealand & Samoa")
- Christopher (Chris) Waind, Vancouver, Canada (NZ coin designer 2006 "Gold Rushes"). Signature: CRW
- Heath Adam Wilkes (coin designer since 2011)
- Ken Wright (born about 1955 in England), Papamoa, Bay of Plenty, New Zealand, designer of the 2009 NZ coins silver series

=== Norwegian ===
- Caspar Herman Langberg (1811 Kristiansand, Norway - 1888 Kongsberg, Norway)
- Ivar Throndsen (1853 Nes, Akershus, Norway - 1932 Kongsberg, Norway)
- Gunnar Karelius Utsond (1864 Kviteseid – 1950 Kviteseid, Norway)

=== Peruvian ===
- Robert Henry Britten (1832 UK – 1882 Lima, Peru)

=== Polish ===
- Józef Aumiller (1892 Warsaw – 1963 Wielen, Poland)
- Tadeusz Breyer (1874 – 1952)
- Bronisław Chromy (1925-2017)
- Zofia Demkowska (1919 – 1991)
- Wacław Głowacki (1828 – 1908)
- Józef Gosławski (1908 – 1963)
- Anna Jarnuszkiewicz (1935 Warsaw – )
- Jerzy Jarnuszkiewicz (1919 – 2005)
- Krystian Jarnuszkiewicz Signature: KJ
- Wojciech Jastrzębowski (1884 Warsaw – 1963 Warsaw)
- Bronisław Krzysztof (born 1956)
- Anthony Francis Mieczyslaw Madeyski (1862 – 1939)
- Józef Markiewicz (1913 – 1991)
- Wiesław Müldner-Nieckowski (1915 – 1982)
- Jerzy Nowakowski (born 1947)
- Krzysztof Szczepan Nitsch
- Katarzyna Piskorska (1937 – 2010)
- Stanisław Plęskowski
- Adolf Ryszka (1935 – 1995)
- Stanisław Sikora (1911 – 2000)
- Stanisława Wątróbska-Frindt (1934 Jaworzno, Silesia – 1994 Warsaw)

=== Portuguese ===
- Luís Filipe de Abreu (born 1935)
- Caetano Alberto Nunes de Almeida (1795 –1851)
- José Simões de Almeida (sobrinho) (1880 Figueiró dos Vinhos – 1950 Lisbon)
- Leopoldo de Almeida (1898 – 1974)
- Venâncio Pedro de Macedo Alves (1853 Lisbon - 1933)
- Pedro Anjos Teixeira (1908 – 1997)
- José Manuel Aurélio (born 1938)
- Rogério dos Santos Azevedo (1898 – 1983)
- Salvador Carvão da Silva d'Eça Barata Feyo (1899 – 1990)
- Maria Barreira (1914-2010)
- Baltazar Manuel Bastos
- Gustavo Bastos (1928-2014)
- Hélder Batista (1932-2015)
- Avelino António Soares Belo (1872 – 1927)
- João Paulo Póvoas Bento d'Almeida (born 1947)
- Vasco Berardo (1933 – 2017)
- Numídico Bessone Borges de Medeiros Amorim (1913 – 1985)
- João José Braga
- Fernando Branco (born 1930 Lisbon)
- Álvaro João Vela de Brée (1903 – 1962)
- José Maria Cabral Antunes (1916 – 1986)
- Frederico Augusto de Campos (1814 Lisbon – 1895 Bemfica, Portugal). Signature: F. A. C.
- Domingos António Cândido
- José Cândido (born 1932)
- Isabel Carriço (born 1943 at Coimbra)
- Cassiano Augusto Vidal da Maia (1844 – 1895)
- Dorita de Castel-Branco (1936 – 1996)
- Luís dos Santos Castro Lobo
- João Charters de Almeida (born 1935)
- Jorge Coelho (1955)
- Vasco Pereira da Conceição (1914-1992)
- Fernando Conduto (born 1937)
- Joaquim Correia (1920-2013)
- Hélio Costa (born 1960)
- Tomás Costa (medallist)
- Vasco Gonçalves Costa (aka Vago) (1921-2005)
- Rui Cunha
- João Cutileiro (1937-2021)
- Carlos Diniz
- António Duarte (1912-1998)
- Paulo Guilherme Ribeiro Dúlio Thomas d'Eça Leal (1932 Lisbon – 2010 Lisbon)
- José Farinha (1920 – 1979)
- Paulo Ferreira (1911-1999)
- Manuel Carvalho Figueira
- Francisco Xavier de Figueiredo (? – 1818)
- João de Figueiredo (1725 – 1809)
- João Fragoso (1913 – 2000)
- Francisco Franco (1888 – 1955)
- José Franco (1920 – 2009)
- Francisco de Borja Freire (1791 – 1869)
- C. Gama
- António Lagoa-Henriques (1923 – 2009)
- Manuel Inácio
- Aureliano Lima (1916 – 1984)
- Casimiro José de Lima (? – 1899)
- António Lino (1914-1996)
- Raul Sousa Machado (born 1921 Viseu, Portugal)
- Manuel da Silva Lúcio
- António Marinho (born 1945 at Guimarães)
- Amaro Marques (? – 1797)
- Joaquim Martins Correia (1910 – 1999)
- Armando Matos Simões (born 1933)
- Clara Menéres (1943-2018)
- Paulo Aureliano Mengin (? – 1788)
- Pedro António Mengin (? – 1795)
- José Arnaldo Nogueira Molarinho (1828 – 1907)
- Cipriano da Silva Moreira (1755 – 1826)
- José de Moura (1915-2016)
- Manuel da Silva Nogueira (born 1926)
- Marcelino Norte de Almeida (1906 Lisbon - 1995)
- António José Oliveira (1921-?)
- João Oom (born 1937)
- António Paiva
- Luís Gonzaga Pereira (1796 – 1868)
- Feliciano Avelino Peres (1821 – ?)
- Rosa Ramalho (? – 1978)
- Ramos de Abreu
- Manuel de Morais Silva Ramos (? – 1872)
- Domingos Alves Cevens do Rêgo (1873 Colmeias, Leiria - 1960 Lisbon)
- Manuel Martins Ribeiro
- José Rodrigues (1936-2016)
- Francisco dos Santos (1878 Paião – 1930 Lisbon)
- Inácio Santos
- José Laranjeira Santos (born 1930)
- José Sérgio Carvalho e Silva
- João da Silva (1880 Lisbon – 1960 Lisbon)
- José de Sousa
- Augusto Jorge Ulisses
- José António do Vale (1765 – 1842)
- Euclides da Silva Vaz (1916-1991)
- Raul da Vaza (born 1935)
- Domingos Venâncio
- Jorge Ricardo da Conceição Vieira (1922 – 1998)
- Maria Irene Lima de Matos Vilar (1930 – 2008)
- Armindo Viseu pseudonym of Armindo Ribeiro (1916 – 2004)
- Raul Maria Xavier (1894 – 1964)

=== Romanian ===
- Ion Jalea (1887 – 1983)
- Constantin Kristescu (1871 – 1928)
- Démètre "Anastase" Anastasescu (born 1909, year of death unknown)
- Haralambie Ionescu (1913 Curtea de Argeș - 1977 Bucharest)

=== Russian ===
- Alexander Vasilyevich Baklanov (1954 Shishkina, Vagay district–)
- Remir Kharitonov (USSR)
- Alexey Koroluck (1933 – 2002)
- Alexander Vasilievich Kozlov (1917 - 1987) Leningrad Mint Chief Engraver 1974-1987
- Alexander Paulovich Lyalin (1802 – 1862)
- Count Feodor Petrovitch Tolstoy (1783 – 1873)
- Nikolay Aleksandrovich Sokolov (USSR) (1892 - 1974), Mint-master Leningrad Mint 1950 - 1971. Signature: Н.СОСОЛОВ
- Yevgeny Vuchetich (USSR) (1908 – 1974)

=== Serbian ===
- Zlatara Majdanpek (Gold Refinery Belgrade established 1969)

=== Slovak ===
- Štefan Schwartz (1851 – 1924)
- Ladislav Snopek (1919 Mařatice – 2010 Bratislava)
- Marián Polonský (1943 Hubina, Slovak Republic)

=== South African ===
- Willie Myburg (Die-sinker at the South African Mint 1965 – 1989)
- Thomas Sasseen (Die-sinker at the South African Mint 1959 – 1974)
- Coert Steynberg (1905 – 1982). Signature: C.L.S.
- Jan van Zyl (born 1946 Kimberley, South Africa). Signature: J.v Z.

=== Spanish ===
- Mariano Benlliure y Gil (1862 Valencia, Spain - 1947 Madrid)
- Fernando Calico Rebull (1909-?)
- Begoña Castellanos Garcia (1967- ) Designer of the 1st Spanish Euro coins
- Salvador Felipé Jacinto Dalí (1904 – 1989)
- Luis José Díaz Salas (1967- ) Designer of the 1st Spanish Euro coins
- Alberto Estruch (1830 Barcelona - 1884)
- Luis Marchionni Hombrón (1815 Paris - 1894 Madrid)
- Bartolomé Maura y Montaner (1844 – 1926)
- Teodoro Miciano Becerra (1903 Jerez de la Frontera - 1974 Madrid)
- Garcilaso Rollán (Designer of the 1st Spanish Euro coins)
- Pablo Ruiz y Picasso (1881 – 1973)
- Gregorio Sellán y González (1829 Madrid - after 1893)
- Ismael Smith (1886 – 1972)
- Jacopo da Trezzo (c. 1515 or 1519 – 1589), or Jacometrezo. Born in Italy
- Remigio Vega (1787 Madrid - 1854 Madrid)

=== Swedish ===
- Lea Ahlborn (1826 – 1897)
- Emil Brusewitz (1840 – 1908)
- Carl Gustaf Fehrman (1746 – 1798)
- Alf Grabe (1880 – 1966) Signature: G
- Leo Jean Holmgren (1904 Paris – 1989 Stockholm)
- Ivar Viktor Johnsson (1885-1970)
- Arvid Karlsteen (1947 - 1718)
- Svante Kede (1877 – 1955)
- Olof Lidijn, Mint-master in Stockholm, (1773 – 1819†)
- Adolf Lindberg (1839 – 1916)
- J. Erik Lindberg (1873 – 1966)
- Ludvig Lundgren (1789 – 1853), Father of Pehr Henrik Lundgren
- Pehr Henrik Lundgren (1824 – 1855) Signature PHL
- Torsten Swensson, Mint-master in Stockholm 1945 – 1961, signature: TS (monogram)
- C.C. Sporrong & Co., founded 1666 in Stockholm
- Sebastian Tham, Mint-master in Stockholm 1855 – 1876, 1797 Forsvik, Sweden - 1876 Stockholm. Signature: S.T.
- Benkt Ulvfot, Mint-master in Stockholm 1961 – 1988, 1923 Nyköping, Sweden - 2013 Norrtälje. Signature: U

=== Swiss ===
- Richard Emil Amsler (1859 Schaffhausen – 1934 Schaffhausen)
- August Blaesi (1903 Stans – 1979 Luzern)
- Hugues Bovy (1841 Geneva – 1903 Hermance)
- August Bösch (1857 – 1911)
- Antoine Bovy (1795 – 1877)
- Hans Brandenberger (1912 Sumbawa, Dutch East Indies – 2003 Zürich, Switzerland)
- Jacques-Antoine Dassier (1715 – 1759)
- Jean Dassier (1676 – 1763)
- Eugène-Baptiste Doumenc (1873 Geneva - 1943)
- Jean-Pierre Droz (1746 – 1823)
- Edouard Durussel, designer of Swiss shooting thalers and medals (1842 Morges - 1888 Bern)
- Hans Frei (1868 Basel – 1947 Riehen)
- Johann Baptist Frener (1821 – 1892)
- Georges Hantz (1846 La Chaux-de-Fonds - 1920 Geneva)
- Jules Holy (1872 Saint-Imier - 1950 Bienne)
- Henri-Édouard Huguenin (1879 – c. 1919–20)
- André Huguenin-Dumittan (1888 – 1975)
- Fritz Huguenin-Jacot (born 1845, year of death unknown)
- Alexander Hutter (1817 Constance - 1876 Bern)
- Richard Kissling (1848 – 1919)
- Fritz Ulysse Landry (1842 – 1927)
- Conrad Meyer (1618 – 1689)
- Jean Henri Samuel Mognetti (1820 Geneva - 1904)
- Johann Rudolf Ochs (1673 Berne – 1750 London)
- C. (Charles Jean) Richard (1832 Geneva, Switzerland -)
- Philipp Jakob Treu (1761 – 1825)
- Charles Vuillermet (1849 – 1918)
- Max Reinhold Weber (1897 Menziken, Aargau – 1982 Collonge-Bellerive, Genève, Switzerland)
- Hans Wildermuth (1846 Zürich - 1902 Zollikon)

=== Tongan ===
- Dudley Moore Blakely (1902 Harriman, Roane County, Tennessee – 1982 Saint Simons Island in Georgia) Signature D B

=== United States ===
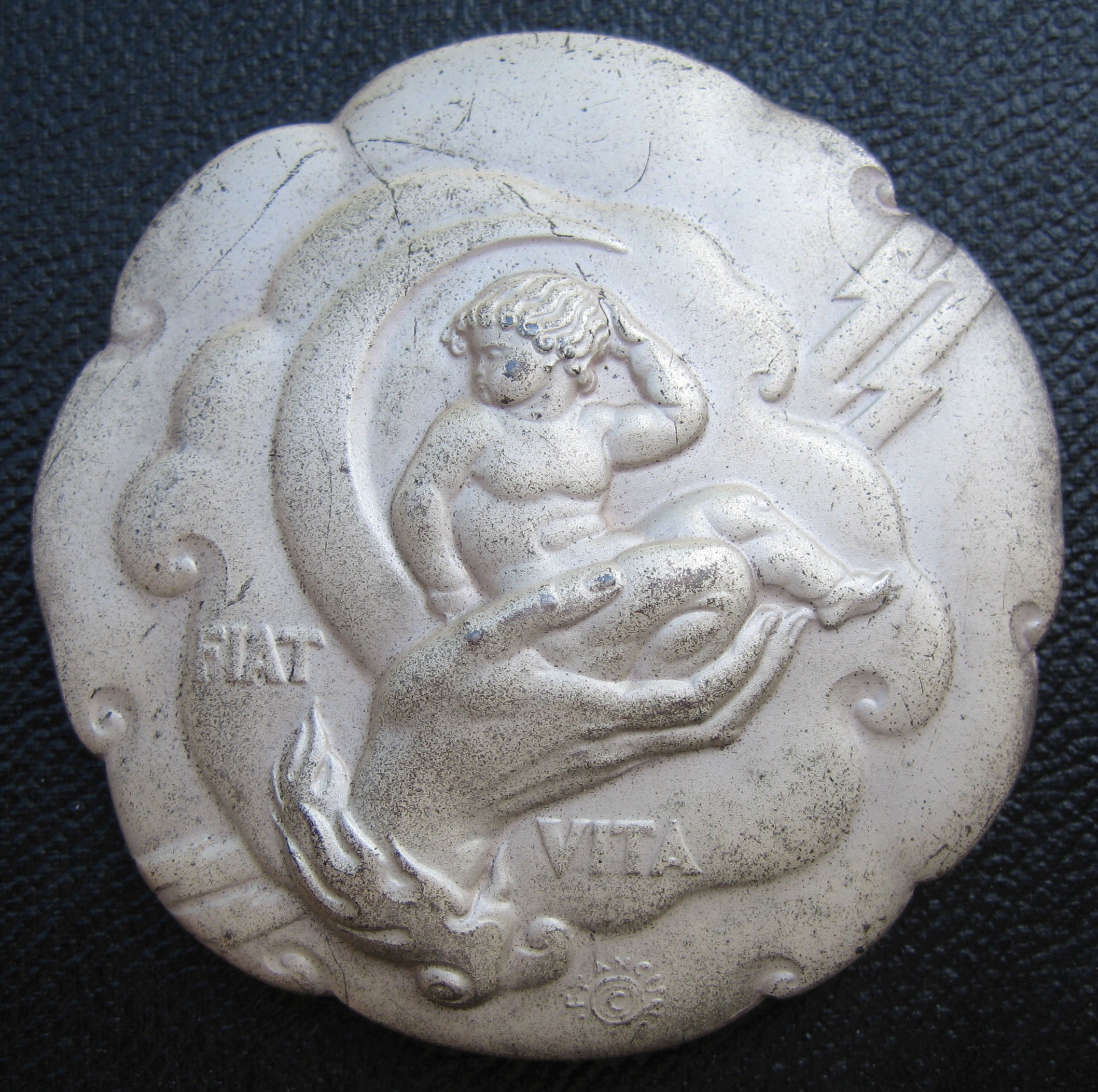
Medal (Obverse) for The Society of Medalists designed by Anthony de Francisci, 1935

Medal (Reverse) for The Society of Medalists designed by de Francisci, 1935

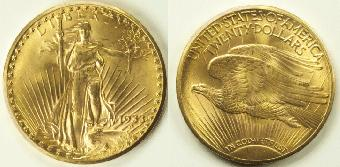
United States coin, the 1933 Double Eagle, designed by Augustus Saint-Gaudens, who also produced artistic medals

- Robert Ingersoll Aitken (1878 – 1949)
- Mark Aron (1910 – 1990)
- Richard W. Baldwin (1921 – 2012)
- Charles E. Barber (1840 – 1917)
- William Barber (1807 – 1879)
- Leonard Baskin (1922 – 2000)
- Chester Beach (1881 – 1956)
- Abram Belskie (1907 – 1988)
- Stanley Bleifeld (1924 – 2011)
- Victor David Brenner (1871 – 1924)
- George Thomas Brewster (1862 – 1943)
- Gaetano Cecere (1894 – 1985)
- Rene Paul Chambellan (1893 – 1955)
- Herring Coe (1907 – 1999)
- Joseph Arthur Coletti
- Robert Cronbach (1908 – 2001)
- Eugene L. Daub (born 1942)
- Thomas James Ferrell (1939 Clayton, New Jersey - 2020 Sewell, New Jersey)
- Anthony de Francisci (1887 – 1964)
- Donald Harcourt De Lue (1897 – 1988)
- René Theophile de Quélin (1853 – 1931)
- Frank Eliscu (1912 – 1996)
- Donald Nelson Everhart II (born 1949 York, Pennsylvania)
- John F. Flanagan (1865 – 1952)
- James Earle Fraser (1876 – 1953)
- Laura Gardin Fraser (1889 – 1966)
- Daniel Chester French (1850 – 1931)
- Moritz Fuerst (1782 – 1840)
- Frank Gasparro (1909 – 2001). Signature: FG
- Christian Gobrecht (1785 – 1844)
- Edward Ryneal Grove (1912 — 2002)
- Gladys Gunzer (1939 – 2016)
- Isaac Scott Hathaway (1872 - 1967)
- Laszlo Ispanky (1919 – 2010)
- Carl Paul Jennewein (1890 – 1978)
- Elizabeth Jones (born 1935 in Montclair New Jersey), Signature: EJ
- Marcel Jovine (1921 – 2003)
- Julio Kilenyi (1885 – 1959)
- Mario Korbel (1882 – 1954)
- Georg Albrecht (Albert) Ferdinand Küner (1819 Lindau, Germany – 1906 San Francisco, California)
- Michael Lantz (1908 – 1988)
- Leo Lentelli (1879 – c. 1961/2)
- James B. Longacre (1794 – 1869)
- George Hampden Lovett (1824 Philadelphia – 1894 Brooklyn, New York)
- Bruno Lucchesi (1860 – 1924)
- Henry Augustus Lukeman (1872 – 1935)
- Oronzio Maldarelli (1892 – 1963)
- Edward Francis McCartan (1879 – 1947)
- Ralph Joseph Menconi (1915 – 1972)
- John M. Mercanti (born 1943 in Philadelphia) Signature: JM
- Albert F. Michini (1925 Philadelphia, Pennsylvania – 1994 Coatesville, Pennsylvania) Signature: am
- Richard McDermott Miller (1922 – 2004)
- George T. Morgan (1845 – 1925)
- Berthold Nebel (1889 – 1964)
- Norman E. Nemeth (1942 Newport News, Virginia – 2012 West Chester, Pennsylvania). Signature: NN
- Edmondo Quattrocchi (1889 – 1966)
- Franklin Peale (1795 – 1870)
- Matthew Peloso (1912 Salerno, Italy – 2008) Signature: MP (monogram)
- Christian Petersen (Danish - American, 1886 - 1961)
- Johann (John) Matthias Reich (1768 Fürth, Bavaria, Germany – 1833 Albany, New York)
- Joseph Emile Renier (1877–1966)
- Richard Renninger (1917 Boyertown, Pennsylvania – 1995 New Holland, Pennsylvania, near Philadelphia). Medallist at Franklin Mint, signature RR.
- Gilroy Roberts (1905 – 1992) Signature: GR (monogram)
- Augustus Saint-Gaudens (1848 – 1907)
- Hans Schaefer (1875 Sternberg, Moravia – 1933 Chicago, Illinois)
- Alexander "Alex" George Shagin (born 1947)
- John Ray Sinnock (1888 – 1947)
- Ken Smith (1951-2020)
- Jonathan M Swanson (1888 Chicago – 1963 New York)
- Lorado Zadoc Taft (1860 – 1936)
- Henry van Wolf (1898 – 1982)
- Adolph Alexander Weinman (1870 – 1952)
- Robert Weinman (1915 – 2003)
- Dennis R. Williams (born 1952 Erie, Pennsylvania) Signature: DRW
- Sherl Joseph Winter (born 1934 in Dayton, Ohio) Signature: JW
- Charles Cushing Wright (1796 Damariscotta, Maine – 1854 New York). Signature: C.C.W.
- Emil Zettler (1878 – 1946)

== Mints specializing in art medals ==
- Medallic Art Company
- Monnaie de Paris (Paris Mint) (founded in 864)
- Mathew Holland, of Bigbury Mint Ltd, Devon, United Kingdom (Founded in 1980, incorporated in 2000). Matthew Holland: Designer of The Promise, Art Medal (British Art Medal Society, New Art Medal 2003)
