= Terracini =

Terracini is a surname. It is the surname of:

- Alessandro Terracini (1889–1968), Italian mathematician
- Catherine Terracini (born c. 1982), Italian-born Australian actress, daughter of Lyndon
- Lyndon Terracini (born 1950), Australian opera singer and director, brother of Paul
- Paul Terracini (born 1957), Australian composer and conductor
- Roberto Terracini (born 1900), Italian sculptor
- Susanna Terracini (born 1963), English-born Italian mathematician
- Umberto Terracini (1895–1983), president of the Constituent Assembly of Italy
