= Hujer =

Hujer is a surname. Notable people with the surname include:

- Flower Hujer (1907–1999), American dancer and modern dance choreographer
- Jiří Hujer (born 1941), Czech luger
- Ludwig Hujer (1872–1968), Austrian sculptor
- CJ Huyer, Canadian singer
