= List of Royal Canadian Mint RCMP coins =

Originally dispatched in the 19th century to patrol the Western frontier, the scarlet-clad Mountie on horseback is a well-known image of Canada. Today, the cavalry drills the Royal Canadian Mounted Police (RCMP) practised over a century ago are performed in front of audiences. The Musical Ride is part of Canada's national identity. The images of the RCMP have been featured on various Canadian coins.

The first coins that featured the image of the RCMP were the twenty-five cent and one dollar coins of 1973. Police Constable Paul Cederberg designed both coins. The twenty-five cent coin is unique in that there are two varieties of the coin. A new obverse with a smaller, more detailed portrait and fewer rim denticles placed farther from the rim was planned for use with the RCMP commemorative reverse. A small quantity of coins was struck with the 1972 obverse, thus creating two varieties for the year. The quantity of the large bust has never been confirmed but most publications on Canadian coins estimate that there are approximately 10,000 of these coins. The 1999 Millennium series of 25-cent pieces included the bust of a Mountie on each of the January and July issues.

Unlike the twenty-five cent coin, the Silver Dollar had the same obverse. The only difference with these coins were the cases. One case was black leatherette, with a coat of arms and an insert that was coloured maroon and black. A second case was created and it was blue leatherette with a gilt RCMP crest, with a maroon and black insert.

== Twenty-Five Cents ==
Year	Theme	Artist	Mintage	Special Notes
1973	100th Anniversary of the RCMP	Paul Cederberg	135,958,589	The 25-cent piece for 1973 bears a special reverse designed by Paul Cederberg (the Police Constable sitting on a horse in the design). It honoured the RCMP for 100 years of service.
1999	Millennium	P. Ka-Kin Poon	12,238,559	Released in January 1999.
1999	Millennium	M.H. Sarkany	16,537,018	Released in July 1999.
2007	Canada Day Coin	N/A	N/A	Numismatic Piece with an issue price of $9.95 featuring MacLean the Mountie

== Fifty cents ==
* This is a numismatic piece and not meant for general circulation.

Year	Artist	Mintage	Issue price
2010	Janet Griffin Scott	14,000	$109.95

== One Dollar ==
Year	Theme	Artist	Mintage	Issue price
1973	RCMP Centennial	Paul Cederberg	904,723	$3.00

Year	Theme	Artist	Mintage (Proof)	Issue price (Proof)	Mintage (Brilliant Uncirculated)	Issue price (Brilliant Uncirculated)
1994	25th Anniversary of the last RCMP dog sled	Ian D. Sparkes	178,485	$24.50	65,295	$17.95
1998	125th Anniversary of RCMP	Adeline Halvorson	130,795	$29.95	81,376	$19.95

== Seventy-Five Dollars ==
Year	Design	Artist	Mintage	Issue price	Release date	Composition	Finish	Weight (grams)	Diameter (mm)	Special Notes
2007	RCMP	Cecily Mok	8,000	$389.95	February 24	58.33% gold, 41.67% silver	Proof (with colour on reverse)	12	27	Canadian Culture, Wildlife, and Winter Games themes

== Two Hundred Dollars ==
The $200 Gold coin of 1993 celebrated the force's 130th anniversary. It featured a uniformed member of the famous "RCMP Musical Ride" alongside his horse, speaking with children. The 1994 Silver Dollar depicted the 25th Anniversary of the last northern dog-sled patrol.

Year	Theme	Artist	Mintage	Issue price
1993	Royal Canadian Mounted Police	Stewart Sherwood	10,807	$389.65

== Gold Maple Leaf ==
The 1-ounce gold bullion coin of 1997 bore the likeness of an RCMP Musical Ride member, its face value was $50, but its guaranteed value was US$310 until January 1, 2000. There was some controversy because some felt that the guaranteed value should have been in the issuing currency. The majority of these pieces were sent to the melting pot, so the piece is a relatively scarce item.

Year	Theme	Artist	Mintage	Issue price	Special Notes
1997	125th Anniversary of the RCMP	Ago Aarand	12,913	$310.00 US Funds	Guaranteed value of $310 US until January 1, 2000

== Silver Maple Leaf ==
Year	Theme	Artist	Mintage	Issue price	Special Notes
1998	RCMP	Walter Ott, RCM Engravers	25,000	N/A	Made for Canada Post
