= Louis Boekhout =

Dutch-Canadian painter (1919–2012)

- Born: 1 March 1919; Bergen-op-Zoom Netherlands
- Died: 9 January 2012 (aged 92); Saint-André-Avellin, Quebec, Canada
- Education: Royal Academy of Fine Arts in Antwerp
- Known for: Landscape art
- Movement: Dutch School; School of Barbizon; Impressionism
- Spouse: Charlotte Krzok

Louis Boekhout (1 March 1919 in Netherlands – 9 January 2012 in Canada) was a painter born in the Netherlands who later immigrated to Québec Canada.

== Biography ==
Born to Theodoor Boekhout et de Anna Maria Heijs, in Bergen-op-Zoom, raised for the most part in Indonesia, Boekhout began his training at the Royal Academy of Fine Arts in Antwerp at the age of 19 where he studied under Floris de Cuyper and later perfected his training in France.

The onset of World War II forced Boekhout to put his painting career on hold. After the war, he immigrated to Québec, where he became acquainted with Marc-Aurèle Fortin (1888–1970). He finally settled in Chénéville, Quebec circa 1970 where he bought a small cottage. The surroundings and peacefulness of the country were an endless source of inspiration. He also taught painting classes and gave French lessons. He had a talent for finding water and was a well-known healer.

== Work ==
Boekhout's body of work includes oils and water color paintings. His art lies somewhere between the Dutch School, the Barbizon school and Impressionism. He enjoyed painting outdoors where his inspiration was his surroundings as well as indoors where his inspiration was memory tempered by his imagination. He never painted from photographs or from illustrations. His philosophy and spirituality transcended his work and gives it a peculiar lightness. Boekhout was also a master at detecting colors and nuances in his surroundings and rendered these in his art.

Boekhout spent many years teaching at the Presentation High School, a residential school for problem youngsters, in Montebello, Quebec.

== Collections ==
Boekhout's art work can be found in public collections like at the Musée national des beaux-arts du Québec, as well as in private collections worldwide such as Collection Le Portal Art Tour, and even at the White House.
