= Sneschana Russewa-Hoyer =

Bulgarian engraver and medallist

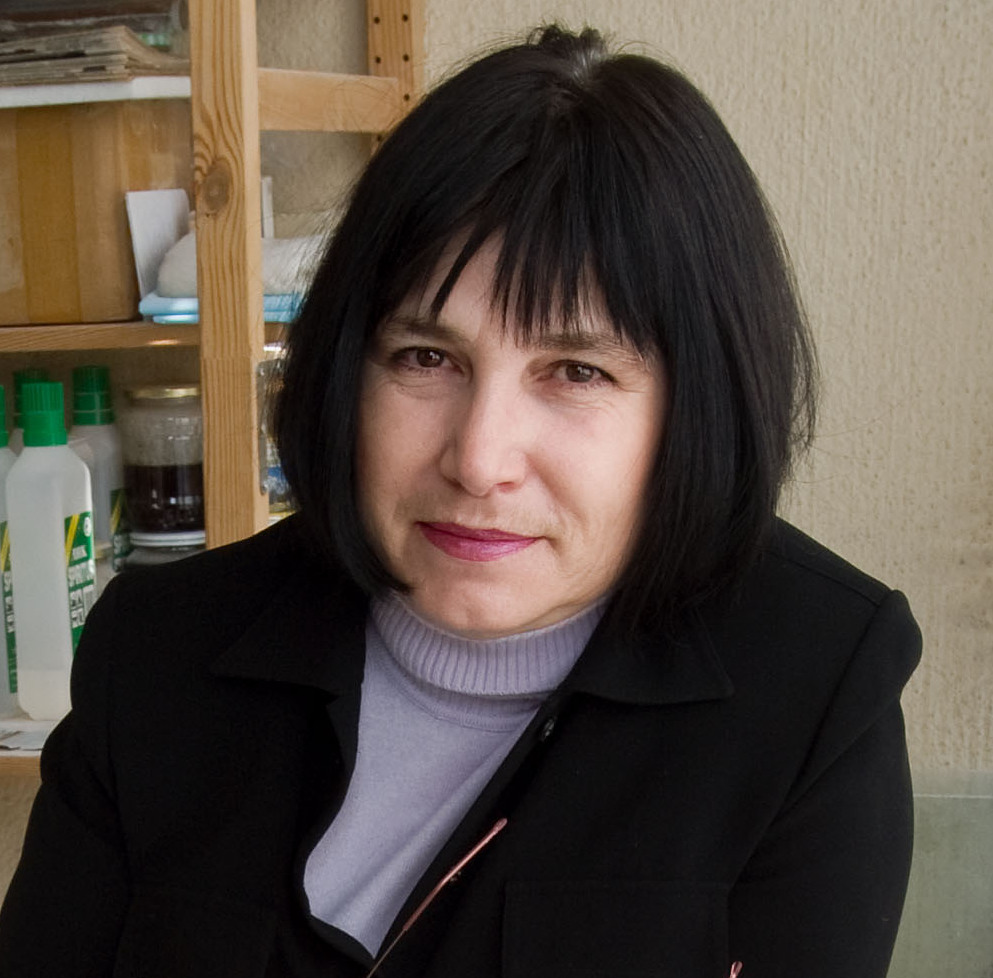
- Born: January 10, 1953 (age 72); Krushari, Bulgaria

Sneschana Russewa-Hoyer (born January 10, 1953) is a Bulgarian engraver and medallist. She lives in Berlin, Germany.

== Life ==
She was born Sneschana Russewa in Krushari, Bulgaria. She received her secondary education at an arts school in Sofia. She studied from 1972 to 1977 at the Kunsthochschule Berlin-Weißensee (Weißensee Academy of Art Berlin). In 1976 she married the sculptor Heinz Hoyer, who had finished his studies at the same academy in 1975.

== Work ==
Sneschana Russewa-Hoyer worked together with her husband Heinz Hoyer in the design of many DDR stamps and coins. After the German Unification in 1990 the Hoyers were creating coins and medals for the Federal Republic of Germany with great success.

An example for a coin design is the national side of the German 1 Euro and 2 Euro coins. These coins are the most common coins in use for more than 300 Million inhabitants of the Eurozone.

An example of a medal design is the 2009 farewell medal for Wolfgang Steguweit, the manager of the Münzkabinett der Staatlichen Museen zu Berlin (Bode Museum).

== Collections ==
- British Museum
- Münzkabinett, Berlin
- Friedrich-Schiller-Universität Jena
