= Giovanni Guido Agrippa =

Italian medalist

Giovanni Guido Agrippa (active c. 1501) was an Italian medalist active in Venice.

Very little is known of the artist; he was in the service of the Doge Leonardo Loredan, on whose behalf he made commemorative medals, which were probably for his inauguration in 1501. One, titled A Triumph, with Venice Crowning Leonardo Loredano as Doge is held at the US National Gallery of Art in Washington, DC. The other is in the collection of the British Museum The Yale Art Gallery also has a medal

It is assumed he was a member of the lower nobility, as one of the medals is signed "knight"; and it was not the custom for artists to receive titles at that time.

== Bibliography ==
- Ulrich Thieme, Felix Becker and a: General Encyclopedia of Artists of the antiquity to the present. Volume 1, Wilhelm Engelmann, Leipzig, 1907, pp. 137
- Artists of the world: The visual artists of all times and peoples (AKL). Volume 1, Seemann, Leipzig 1983, p 571
- Content translated from corresponding German Wikipedia article
