= Frode Bahnsen =

Danish medallist and artist

Frode Bahnsen (1923–1983) was a Danish sculptor, medallist, ceramist and painter. He served as chief medallist for the Royal Danish Mint for the last 15 years of his life.

== Biography ==
Bahnsen was trained as a medallist under Harald Salomonsen. He worked at the Royal Mint from 1948 until his death. In 1968, he was appointed as chief medallist. Ge has also created the Sirius Patrol's medal (1975).

Bahnsen also worked as a ceramicist in his own workshop in "Den 3. kunstnerby" in Hjortekær, Kongens Lyngby, an artist's village, which he, together with carver Ulrika Marseen, established first half of the 1950s. From here he produced stoneware under his own name (FB) as well as i.a. under the name MELFF. He also created a teapot design for the Palshus ceramics manufacturer.

Bahnsen's first education was as a sign painter. He later took drawing and painting lessons from, among others Aage Handest in Århus and throughout his life was also active as a painter.
