= Karl Perl =

Austrian sculptor and engraver

Karl Perl ( March 3, 1876 – 1965) Austrian sculptor and engraver, born in Liezen, Austria. He studied with Hellmer, Zumbusch and Kundmann and is remembered for his busts, bas reliefs and medallions. He worked and died in Vienna.
