= Girolamo Vassallo =

Italian medallist

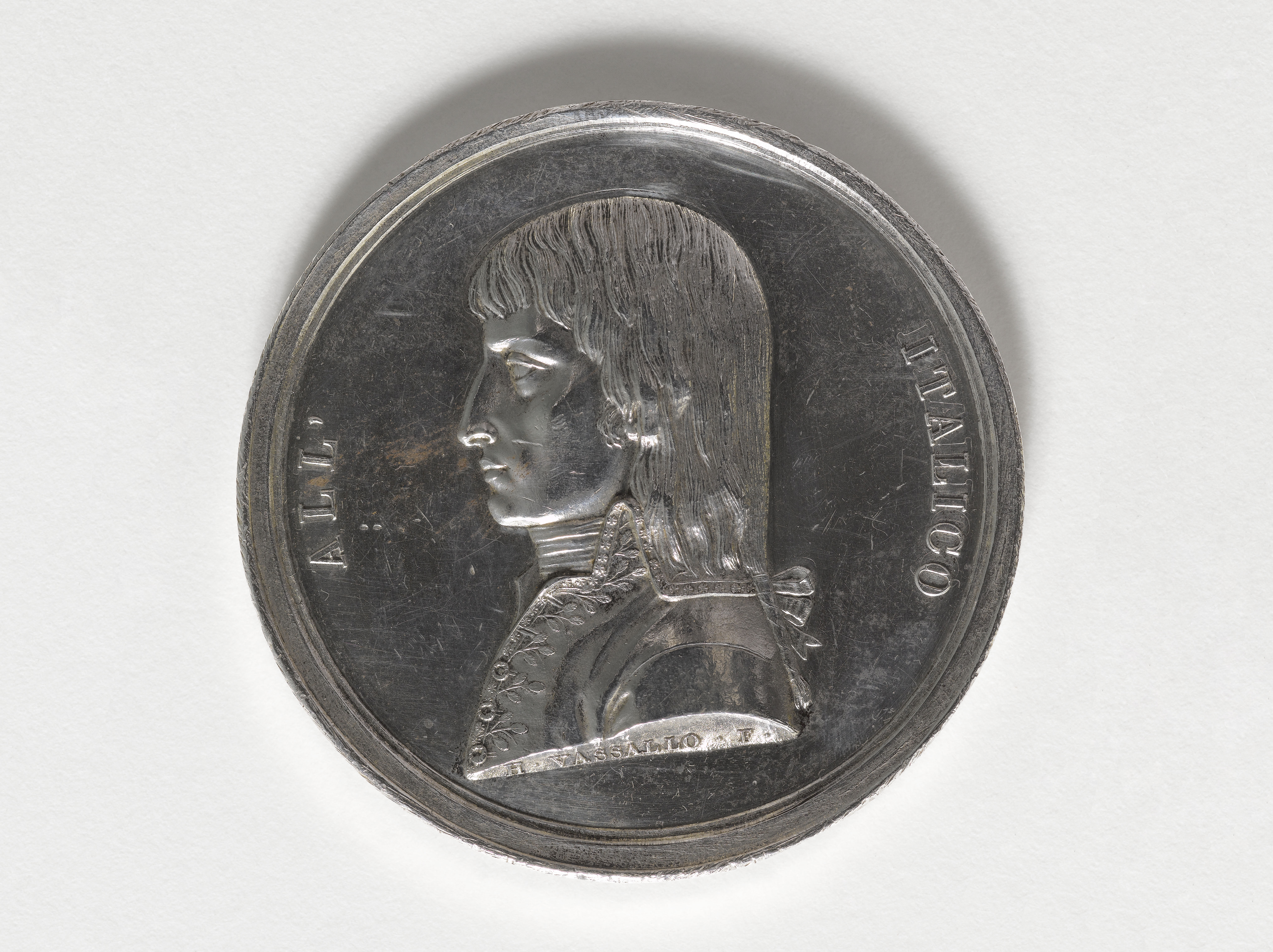
Coin engraved by Vassalo in 1797 with the bust of Napoleon Bonaparte

Girolamo Vassallo, also known as Gerolamo or Hieronymus Vassallo, was an Italian engraver and medallist, born in Genoa in 1773 and died on 10 March 1819 in Milan. He was a student of Franz Joseph Salwirk and studied at the Academy of Fine Arts of Genoa around 1788. Later, he became the apprentice of chief engraver Anton Guillemard, at the Mint of Milan. In 1797, he moved to the Mint of Genoa and became chief engraver there in 1800. In 1808, he moved to Milan to assist Luigi Manfredini. Financial concerns and ill health led the artist to suicide in March 1819.

Vassallo is the author of the coins of Genoa until 1808, the coins of the Ligurian Republic of 1797 and 1805, as well as numerous Genovese, Milanese, and French medals. He also engraved several state medals for Francis I of Austria.
