= Léonce Alloy =

French sculptor and engraver

Léonce Alloy (1875–1949) was a French medallic sculptor and engraver.

He was born in Paris. He was a student of Barrias, Chaplain, Vernon and Couteau. He was a member of the Société des artistes français and exhibited from 1902 to 1942.
