= Giacomo Merculiano =

Italian sculptor

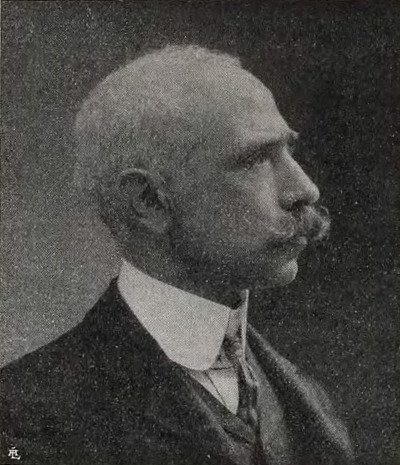
- Born: 29 September 1859; Naples
- Died: November 1935 (aged 75–76)
- Occupation: Sculptor

Giacomo Merculiano (29 September 1859 - November 1935) was an Italian sculptor, medallist, and illustrator.

He studied at the Institute of Fine Arts in Naples, where he first gained recognition for a stucco statue titled Aspiration, exhibited at the Promotrice of Naples. In 1889 at the same Exhibition, he displayed a bronze statuette titled Canto fermo. He completed the bronze bust for the funereal monument of Count Giulio di Conversano in Camposanto di Naples.

While Merculiano also dabbled in painting, sculpture was his main output. By 1900, he was living in Paris, France, and would sign his works Jacques Merculiano or J. Merculiano. He focused mainly on depictions of animals. He exhibited from 1914 on in the Salon in Paris.

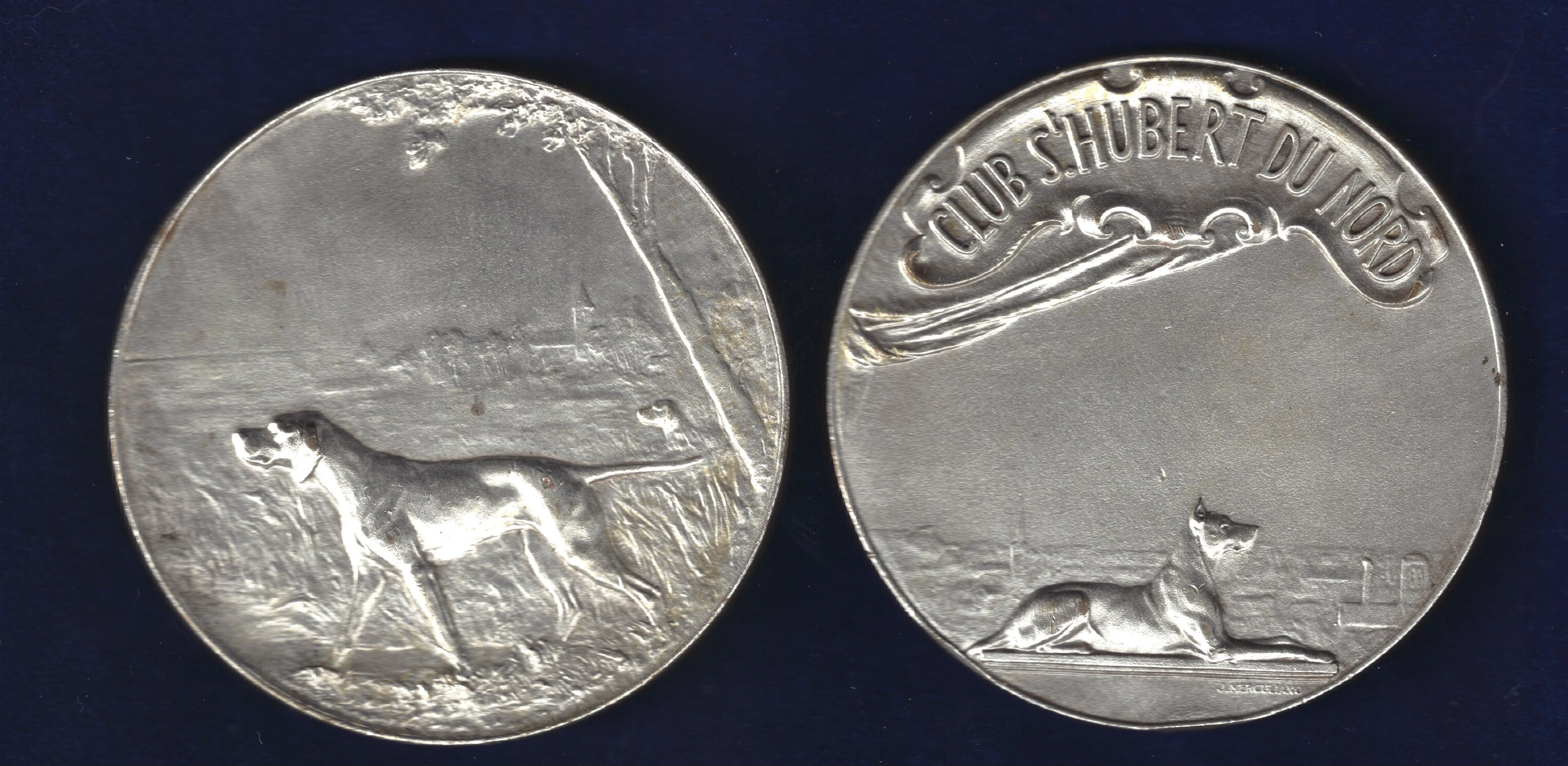
French Kennel Club Prize Medal Art Nouveau by Merculiano

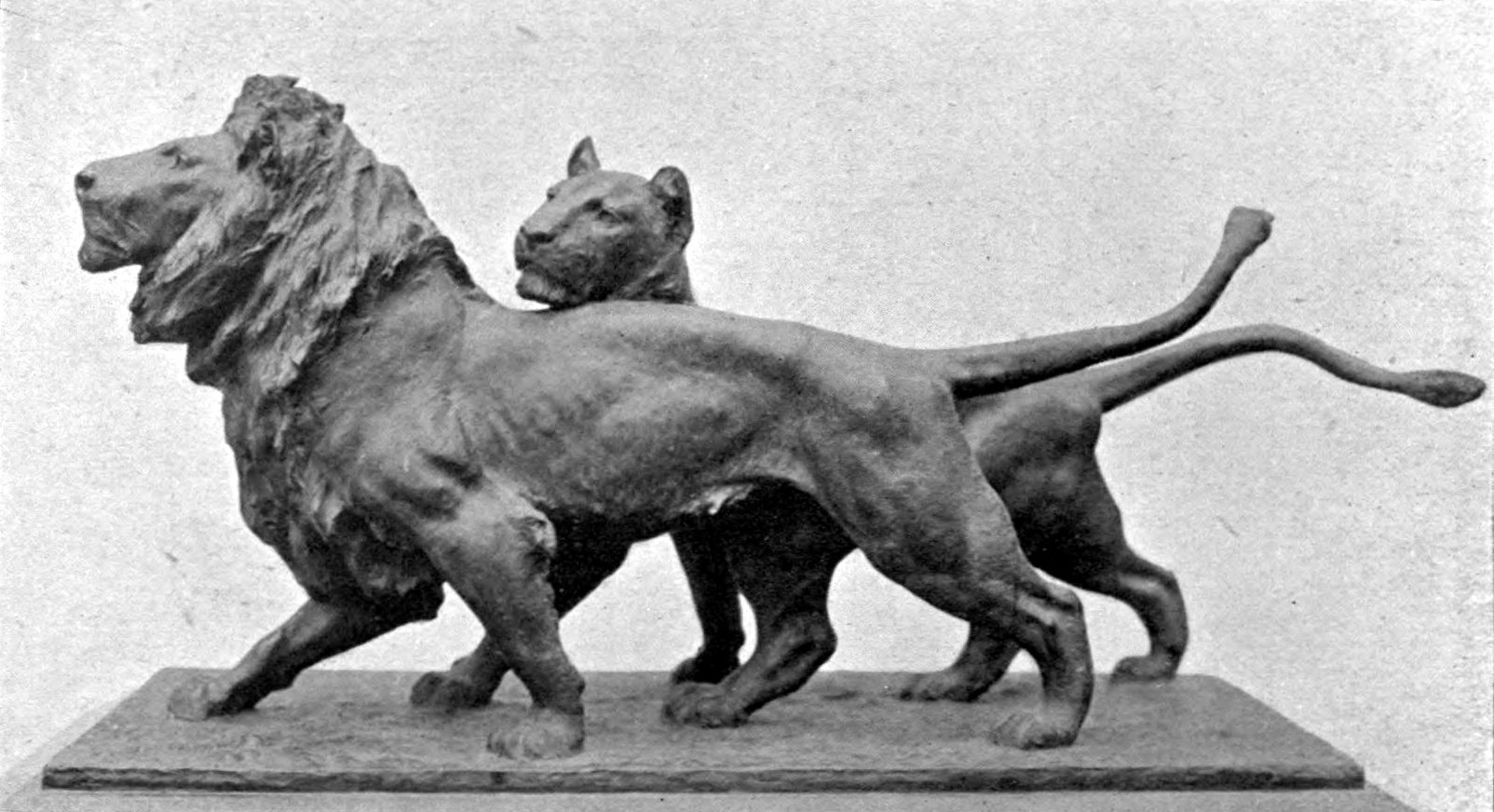
Lion and Lioness

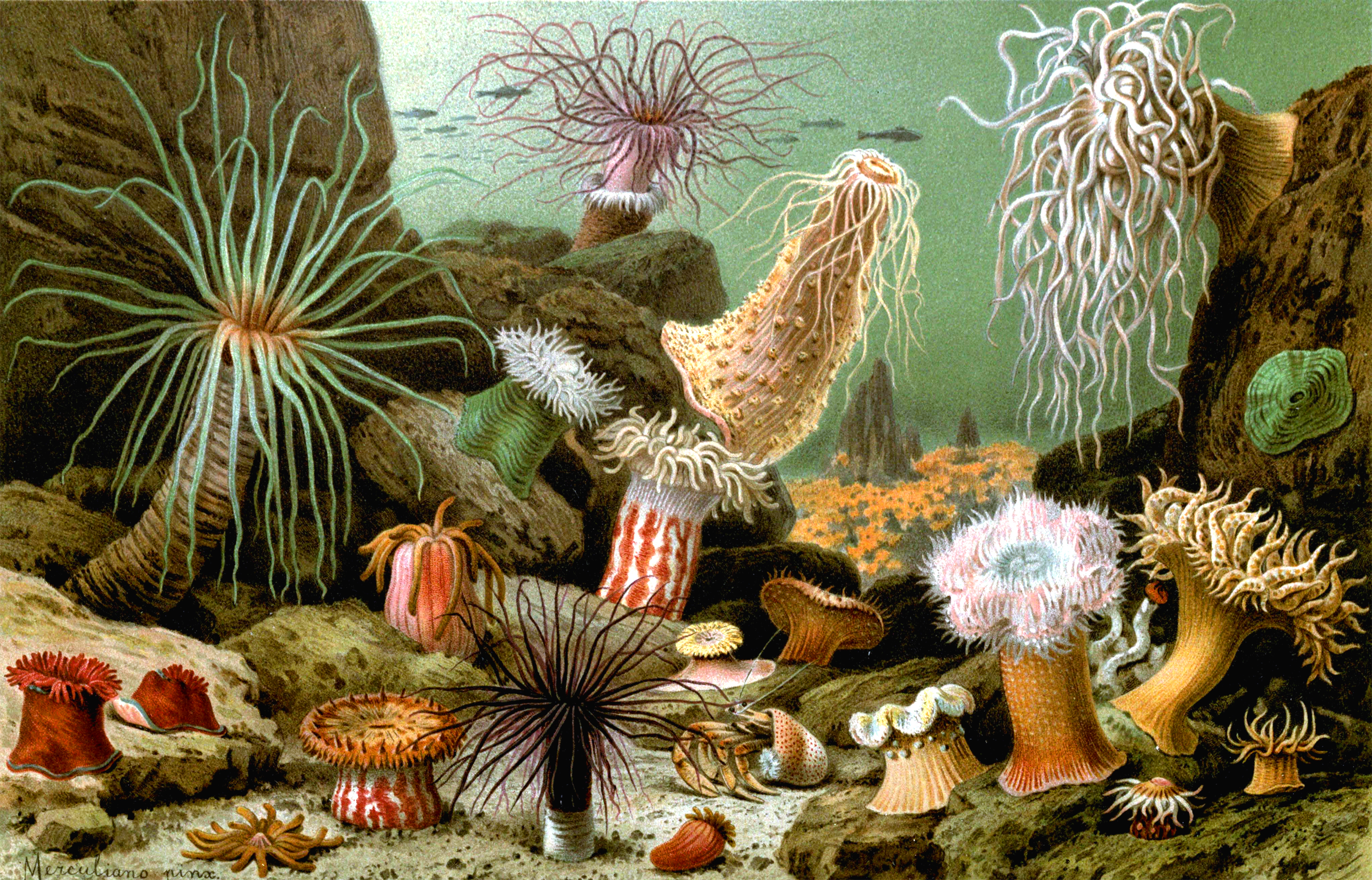
Actiniaria by Merculiano, 1893, in Richard Lydekker's The Royal Natural History
