= Guerrino Mattia Monassi =

Italian medalist and engraver

Guerrino Mattia Monassi (Urbignacco di Buja, 1918 - Bergamo, 1981) was an Italian medalist and engraver. He was a pupil of Pietro Giampaoli who called him to Rome in 1934 in the workshop of Torre dei Capocci. In 1963 he was appointed chief engraver at the Istituto Poligrafico e Zecca dello Stato.

Among his best known works is the 1974 silver "Marconi" 500 lire piece.
