= Richard Martin Werner =

German sculptor

- Born: 21 January 1903; Offenbach am Main, Germany
- Died: 2 October 1949 (aged 46); Oberursel, Germany
- Occupation: Sculptor

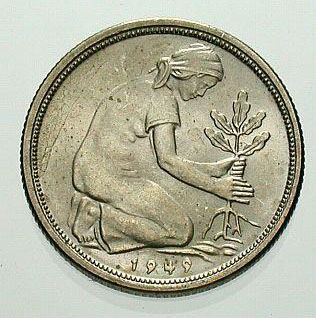
West-German coin 50 Pfennig 1949 reverse

Richard Martin Werner (21 January 1903 – 2 October 1949) was a German sculptor and medalist. His work was part of the sculpture event in the art competition at the 1936 Summer Olympics.

Werner's last important work was the design of the reverse of the West-German 50 Pfennig coin. Werner modified drawings of his wife Gerda Johanna Werner, for the Trümmerfrau. He never saw this popular coin in circulation, because of his early death in October 1949, just before this coin was issued for the first time by Bank deutscher Länder.
