= Helmut Zobl =

Austrian medallist living in Vienna (born 1941)

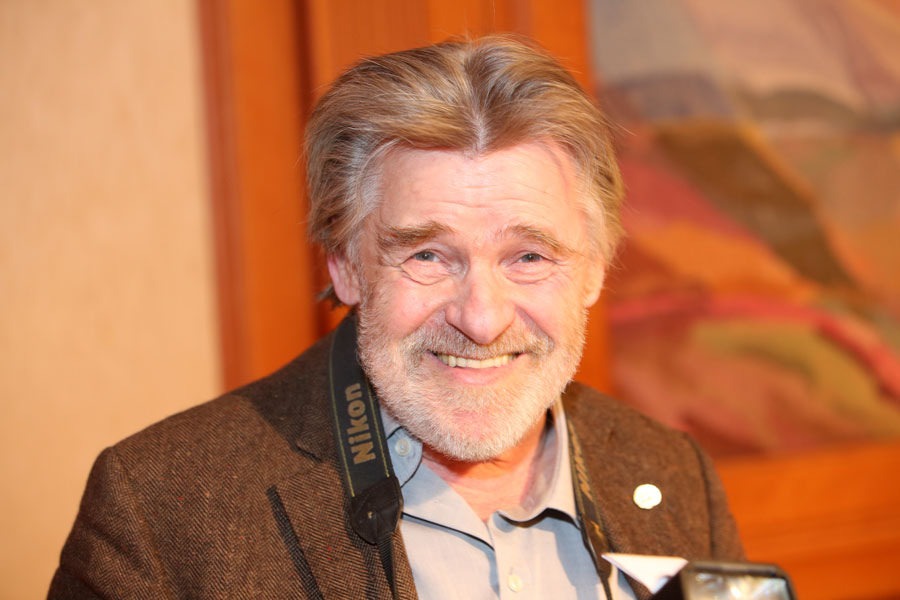
- Helmut Zobl in 2015
- Born: May 6, 1941 (age 85); Schwarzach im Pongau, Austria
- Education: Academy of Fine Arts Vienna
- Known for: Painting

Helmut Zobl (born 6 May 1941 at Schwarzach im Pongau, Austria) is an Austrian medallist living in Vienna.

== Life ==
Helmut Zobl studied at the Academy of Fine Arts Vienna from 1960 to 1965. From 1967 to 1970, he was an Assistant of Ferdinand Welz at the Meisterschule für Medaillenkunst.

== Work ==
Since 1970, Helmut Zobl has been working as a freelance artist coin designer, painter, sculptor etc. He became one of the most important contemporary medallists of Austria. He has designed many Austrian coins and medallions. Since 1971, Zobl has been a member of the Wiener Secession. In 1994, he became a member of Deutsche Gesellschaft für Medaillenkunst. He was awarded with high prizes and honors.
