= Daniel Friedrich Loos =

German medallist (1735–1819)

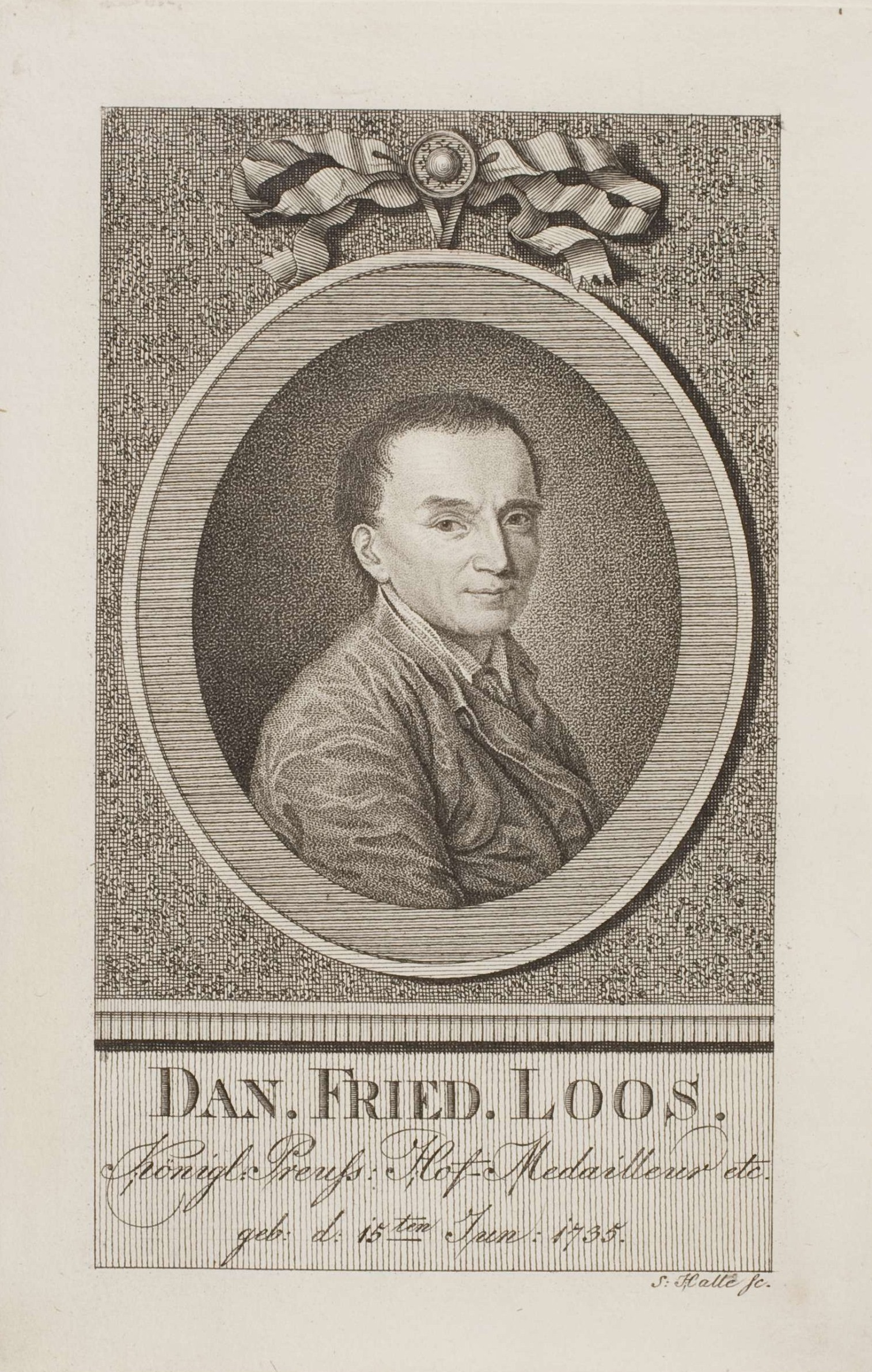
- Born: June 15, 1735; Altenburg, Saxe-Gotha-Altenburg, Holy Roman Empire (now Germany)
- Died: October 1, 1819 (aged 84); Berlin, Kingdom of Prussia (now Germany)
- Occupations: Medallist, engraver, die-cutter
- Children: 2

Daniel Friedrich Loos (June 15, 1735 – October 1, 1819) was a German medallist, engraver, and die-cutter. He was the chief engraver and medalist for the Kingdom of Prussia, and was given the title Prussian Court Medallist.

== Biography ==
Daniel Friedrich Loos was born June 15, 1735, in Altenburg, Saxe-Gotha-Altenburg, Holy Roman Empire (now Germany). He trained as an engraver under Johann Friedrich Stieler (1729–1790).

He worked at the Prussian Mint in Magdeburg from 1756 until its closure during the Seven Years' War. He moved to Berlin in 1768, to work at the new Staatliche Münze Berlin. Loo was given the title "Prussian Court Medallist" in 1787, which brought him membership of the Prussian Academy of Arts (now Academy of Arts, Berlin). On May 1, 1816, he was awarded a metal for his work for 60 years serving the state.

He had two sons which continued his work, Friedrich Wilhelm Loos (ca. 1767–1819), and Gottfried Bernhard Loos (1774–1843).

Loos work can be found in museum collections, including the National Gallery of Art in Washington, D.C., the British Museum in London, and the National Museum Paleis het Loo.
