= Paul Sturm =

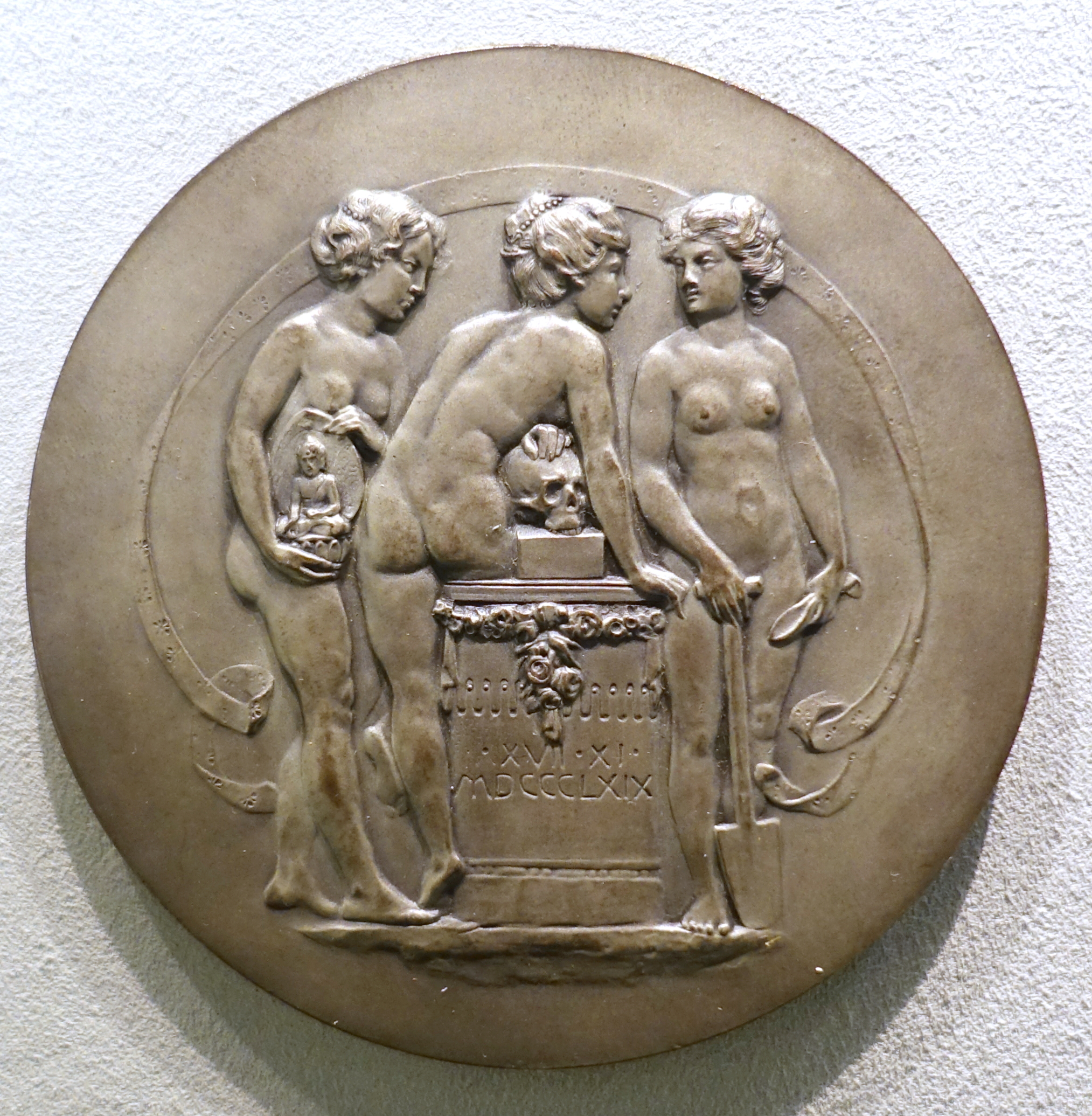
Berlin Company for Anthropology, Ethnology, and Prehistory, by Paul Sturm, 1909

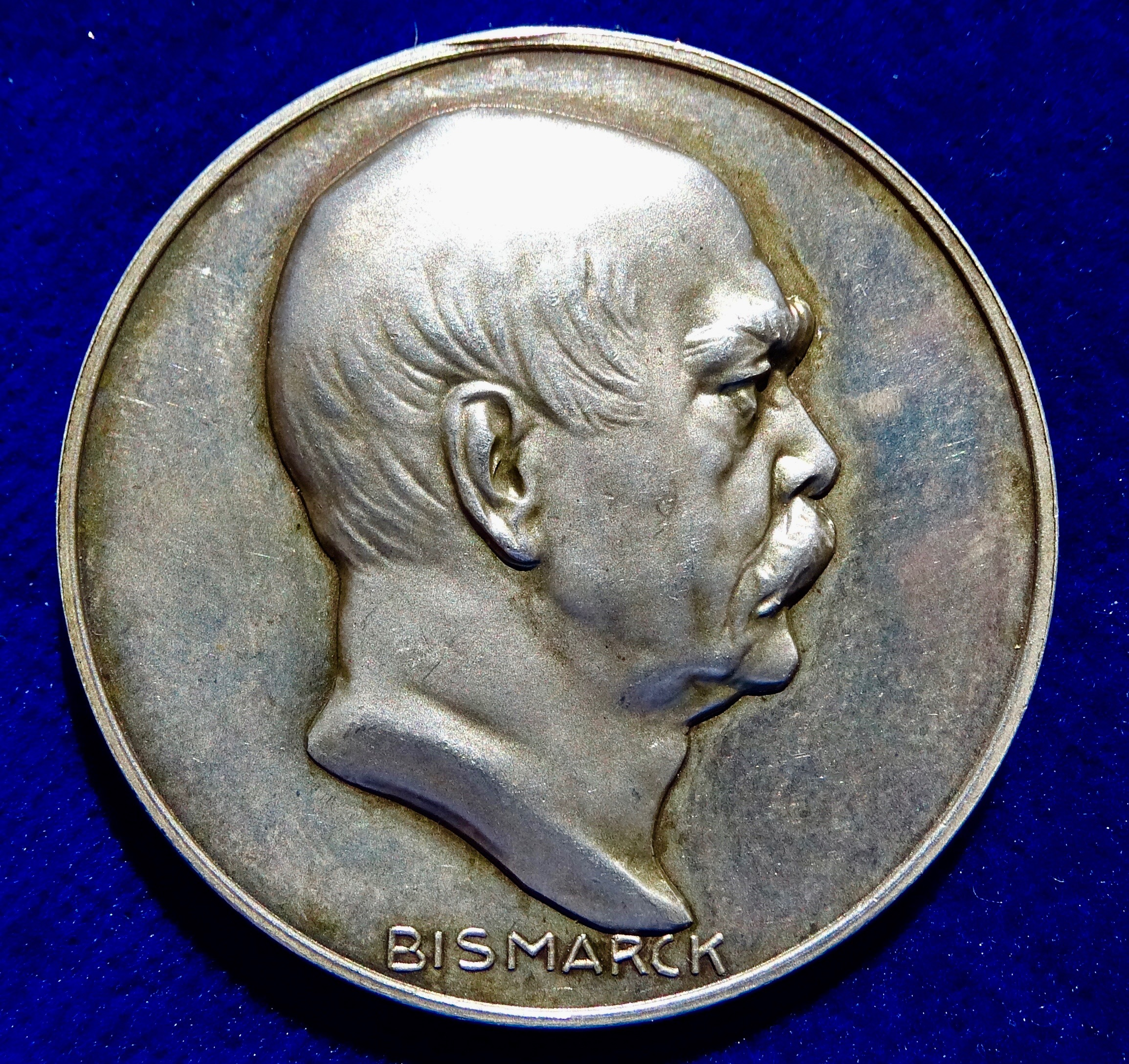
1915 WWI Judaica Silver Medal by Sturm for Otto von Bismarck's 100th Birthday, edited by Hugo Grünthal, obverse.

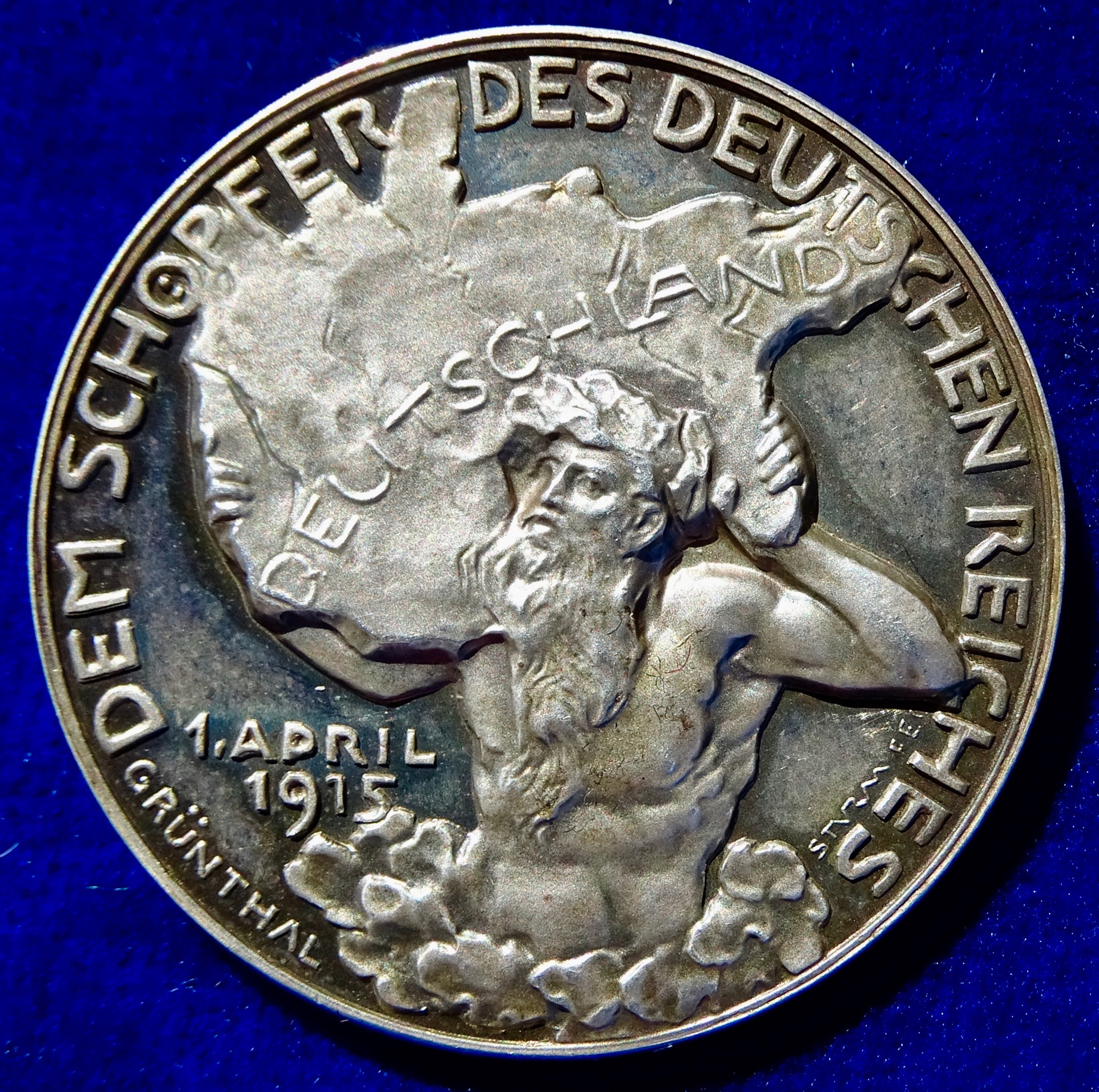
1915, the reverse of this medal is symbolising the war efforts by a giant carrying Germany.

Paul Sturm (1 April 1859 – 21 December 1936) was a German Art Nouveau sculptor, medallist and designer.

== Life ==
Sturm was born in Leipzig, Kingdom of Saxony. He started his education with an apprenticeship as a wood carver. His tertiary education was gained at schools of Fine Art in Munich, Zurich, Lausanne, and Lyon. From 1884 he studied at the Hochschule für Grafik und Buchkunst Leipzig.

In 1908 he relocated to Berlin, where he had to accept an early retirement for health reasons in 1919 under difficult post war conditions. From 1919 he lived with his second wife Hedwig Weckwerth, the widow of the medallist Hermann Weckwerth, at Bad Frankenhausen, Thuringia.

Sturm's two marriages were not well fated, and his life ended in the mental hospital in Jena Thuringia on 21 December 1936.

== Work ==
- 1903: Paul Sturm won the competition for the design of the award medal for the Dresden exhibition (Sächsische Kunstausstellung Dresden).
- 1904: He took part in the World Exhibition St Louis in the Room of Leipzig showing his medallions, and plaque medals.
- 1906: The King of Saxony awarded him the title Professor.
- From 1908 to 1919 medallist (Staatsmedailleur) at the Berlin State Mint.

== Bibliography ==
Bannicke, Elke: Das Friedrich-Franz-Alexandra-Kreuz für Werke der Nächstenliebe von Mecklenburg-Schwerin – Zum 70. Todestag des preußischen Staatsmedailleurs Paul Sturm. In: Beiträge zur brandenburgisch/preussischen Numismatik Numismatische Hefte des Arbeitskreises Brandenburg/Preussen Heft 14 (2006), pages 141–155.
