= Floris de Cuyper =

Floris de Cuyper (1875 – 1965) was a Belgian sculptor and medallist.
