= Roberto Terracini =

Italian sculptor

- Born: 6 January 1900; Turin, Italy
- Died: 15 July 1976 (aged 76); Turin, Italy
- Occupation: Sculptor

Roberto Terracini (6 January 1900 – 15 July 1976) was an Italian sculptor. His work was part of the sculpture event in the art competition at the 1936 Summer Olympics.
