= Ludwig Hujer =

Austrian sculptor

Ludwig Hujer (July 20, 1872, Jizerka (Klein Iser/Wihelmshöhe) Czech Republic - October 25, 1968, Vienna (Austria) was an Austrian sculptor and medalist. Ludwig Hujer graduated K.K. Kunstgewerbliche Fachschule Gablonz ( Imperial and Royal art and crafts technical school in Jablonec nad Nisou). Studied in Vienna with professors Karl Ludwig August Kühne and Stefan Schwartz. On his study trips, he gets acquainted with the works of French medalists: Jules-Clément Chaplain, Félix Charpentier, René Jules Lalique, Ernest Paulin Tasset.

He worked in the workshops of the Wyon dynasty of London medalists, members of which were chief engravers of the seals at the royal court. He is best known for his bas-reliefs and medallions.On October 17, 1962, he was made an honorary member of the Künstlerhaus.
