= Napoléon (coin) =

Former French gold coin

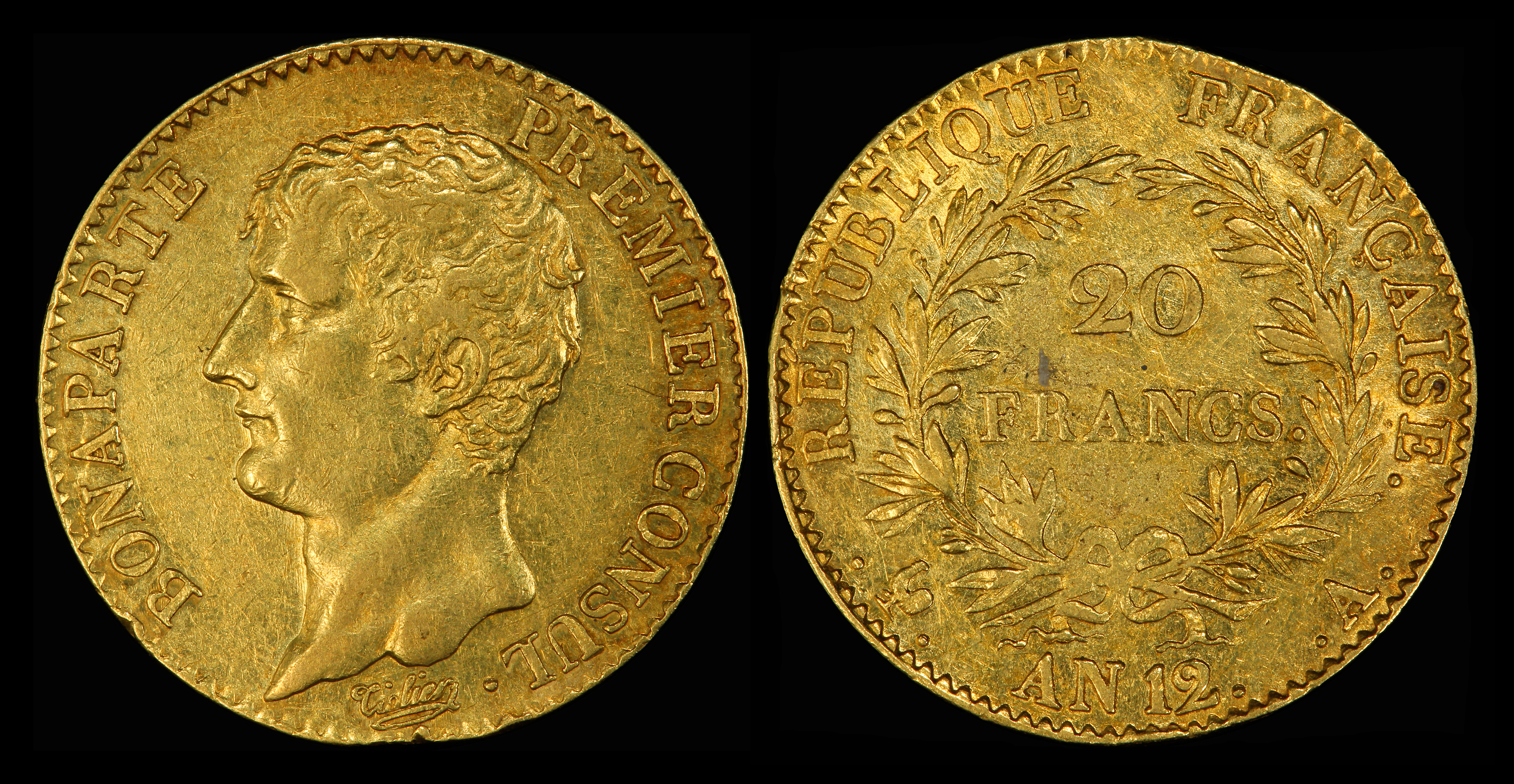
A 20-franc Napoléon from the latter part of 1803, also known as An 12. N.B. the French Revolutionary calendar began in September with the Revolution and therefore each Revolutionary year falls into two Gregorian calendar years.

The Napoléon is the colloquial term for a former French gold coin. The coins were minted (at various times) in denominations of 5, 10, 20, 40, 50, and 100 francs. This article focuses on the 20 franc coins issued during the reign of Napoléon Bonaparte, which are 21 mm in diameter, weigh 6.45 grams (gross weight) and, at 90% pure, contain 0.1867 troy ounces (5.807 g) of pure gold. The coin was issued during the reign of Napoleon I and features his portrait on the obverse. The denomination (known as the Franc Germinal) continued in use through the 19th century and later French gold coins in the same denomination were generally referred to as "Napoléons". Earlier French gold coins are referred to as Louis (the name of eighteen French kings) or écu (an old French word for shield). Gold Napoléons have historically proven more resilient than other gold coins to economic forces, such as after the Suez Crisis when unlike other coins Napoléons did not weaken.

== Overview ==
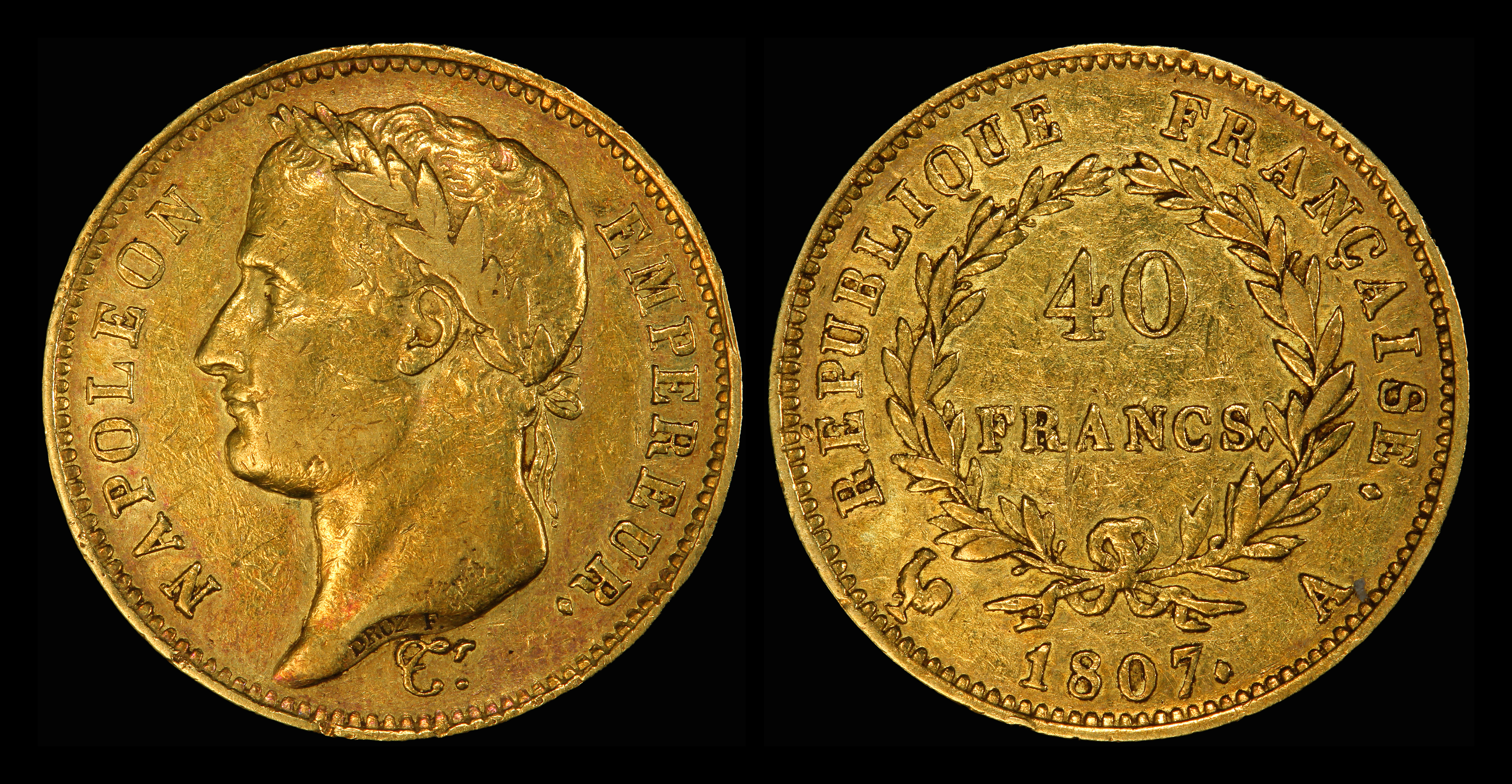
A 40-franc Napoléon from 1807

The coins were originally minted in two denominations, 20 and 40 francs for Napoléon Bonaparte. The 40-franc gold piece did not become popular. The 20 franc coins are 21 mm in diameter (about the size of a U.S. five-cent piece or a Swiss 20 Rappen coin), weigh 6.45 grams (gross weight) and, at 90% pure, contain 0.1867 troy ounces (5.807 g) of pure gold. The 40 franc coins are 26 mm in diameter, weigh 12.90 grams (gross weight) and are 90% pure gold.

They were issued during the reign of Napoleon I and feature his portrait, sometimes bare headed and other times wearing a laurel wreath (the ancient Roman symbol of imperial or military glory) and, depending upon the political status of France, the words on the front: either Bonaparte – Premier Consul (First Consul) or Napoléon Empereur (emperor). On the back: the legends read either "RÉPUBLIQUE FRANÇAISE" (French Republic) or after 1809, "EMPIRE FRANÇAIS" (French Empire). There was even a 20 and 40 Lire Napoleon minted under the auspices of the Kingdom of Italy, a client state. "Bonaparte First Consul" pieces of similar size, weight and fineness were struck at the Turin Mint. The obverse (L'Italie Délivrée à Marengo]) recounts that Italy was liberated from Austria by Bonaparte at Marengo, Piedmont on 14 June 1800, whereat the French General Louis Desaix was killed. The reverse indicates the extent liberated lands, known as Gaul Subalpine, Eridania or Northern Italy. The type was created pursuant to the decree of the Gaul Subalpine government established after the Battle of Marengo and which existed from 16 June 1800, through 11 September 1802.

== Dates of usage of the "Napoléon" coins ==
The coin continued in use through the 19th century and later French gold coins in the same denomination were generally referred to as "Napoleons". In particular the coins of Napoleon I were minted not only at the several French mints but also at the mints in Italian territories: Genoa, Turin (1803 to 1813), Rome (1812 to 1813), the Netherlands: Utrecht (1812 to 1813), and Swiss territories: Geneva, during the French occupation of these places. Although the mints came under French administration and minted French Empire coins, it was otherwise business as usual as the incumbent mint masters remained in their posts, for example: Sarwaas in Utrecht, Paroletti in Turin and Mazzio in Rome.

== French coins minted in London ==
Some coins of King Louis XVIII were minted in London in 1815. The English were supportive of the return of the French king to power after he was deposed by Napoleon in 1815, during the famous Hundred Days. The coins minted at London were purportedly authorized by Louis XVIII himself and were used to pay British troops occupying parts of North Western France. Some coins found their way to Paris and were considered counterfeits by the monetary authorities there and then. There was an exchange of diplomatic letters between France and England and the activity was stopped. The English artist who engraved the London dies, Thomas Wyon, Jr. (1792–1817), a highly accomplished artist, was insulted when his dies which were low relief based on the French struck coins and the original engravings of London born French engraver Pierre Joseph Tiolier (1763–1819) were considered inferior. Allegations also arose that the London Mint did not respect French law regarding fineness and tolerance with these coins and these facts have been offered for the early withdrawal of the coins from circulation. However, contemporaneous assays demonstrated adherence to the French law by the London minters. No coins were struck after 30 November 1815.

French mints of the time of Napoleon I
Letter	City	Letter	City	Letter	City
A	Paris	AA	Metz	B	Rouen
BB	Strasbourg	CL	Genoa	D	Lyon
G	Geneva	H	La Rochelle	I	Limoges
K	Bordeaux	L	Bayonne	M	Toulouse
M/A	Marseille	Q	Perpignan	R	Orléans
T	Nantes	W	Lille	flag	Utrecht
U	Turin	Crown/R	Rome	R	London

== First authorized by the Monetary Ordinance of 28 March 1803 ==
Napoleon tried to unify Europe and almost succeeded, especially in terms of the coinage. The Napoleon coin was first authorized by a Monetary Ordinance of 28 March 1803 by the Premier Consul (First Consul) Napoleon Bonaparte. The 20 franc gold pieces which he authorized in 1803, became the model of all the coins of the Latin Monetary Union which circulated in Europe until 1914. The French coin carries the effigy, in profile, Napoleon, who would later become the French Emperor. The coins had the same value as the Louis, which bears the likeness of the pre-French Revolution King Louis XIV. For Napoleon, there were ostensibly seven types or varieties of the coins minted. In general the varieties differed in terms of obverse legend, reverse legends, portraiture, and calendaring system. For each variety, there was a new enabling statute or executive decree: 28 March 1803; 7 April 1803; 26 June 1804; 8 September 1805; 11 February 1807; 5 August 1807; and 22 October 1808. By extension, the term Napoleon is applied today to all the various types of 20 franc French gold pieces.

=== "The Euro before the Euro" ===
Although the portraits and legends changed with the political changes in France, the denomination remained in usage until World War I under what was known as the Latin Monetary Union, the "Euro before the Euro", so-to-speak. Switzerland had 20 Swiss franc pieces, Spain had 20 peseta coins, Italy had 20 lira pieces, Belgium had 20 Belgian franc coins, and Greece had 20 drachma coins, all of which circulated and were accepted throughout Europe. Only for political reasons did the United Kingdom and the German Empire refuse to follow this direction. Attempts were even taken to explore the unification of the European currency with the American dollar, which explains the extremely rare U.S. pattern coins carrying $4 marking on the face and 25 franc markings on the reverse.

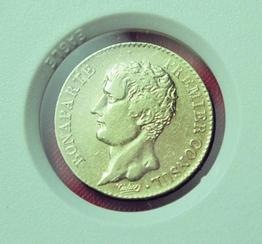
Obverse of the Bonaparte Premier Consul struck in 1803 at Paris, the first year of issue. Note the youthful portrait of Napoleon and compare to later issues reflecting contemporaneous appearances of the Emperor. Engravers: Jean-Pierre Droz (1746–1823) & Pierre-Joseph Tiolier (1763–1819).

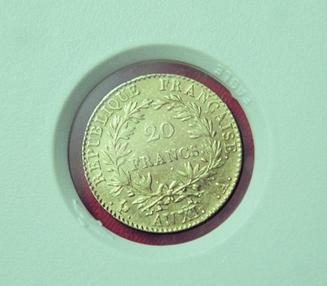
Reverse of the same coin 1803 Paris (AN XI indicates the 11th year after the French Revolution, or the latter part of 1803). A coin not often seen (58,262 were minted), this example exhibits Extra Fine details for a 206-year-old coin. The "A" denotes the Paris mint and the rooster denotes the mint master Charles-Pierre de l'Espine (1797–1821). Napoleon ordered coins struck in year 11 to be dated with Roman numerals fearing that Arabic numeral eleven would look like a two in Roman numerals and thus remind the public of the horrors of the Reign of Terror which occurred in the year 2.

== Distinguishing marks of the mint masters ==
The coins bear the signature of the master engraver responsible for the engraving of the coins' dies. In later times the engraver used a symbol to identify himself. The coins also bear the mark (a symbol, letter, or monogram) denoting the particular French (or French controlled) mint which struck the coin. These mint marks often signal the rarity of the issue, for example the Napoleon 20 franc gold coin struck in 1809 at Paris and marked with the letter "A" had an issue of 687,508 coins; in the same year at the mint at Bordeaux, marked with the letter "K" only 2,534 coins were struck; while the mint at Lille, marked with a "W" struck 16,911 coins. Over the years there were some twenty-three French mints not only in France but also in annexed or occupied countries, including Italy, Switzerland and the Netherlands.

== The engravers ==
Jean Pierre Droz (1746–1823), was perhaps the most skillful and certainly the most famous engraver and medallist of his day. Born in La-Chaux-de-Fonds, Switzerland, Droz studied in Paris and won acclaim with his fine pattern piece known as the Écu de Calonne after the French finance minister. This coin was struck with an edge inscription using a six-segmented collar (virole brisée) of Droz' own invention at the Paris Mint. After a brief tenure at Matthew Boulton's Birmingham (Soho) Mint, Droz returned to France and in 1799 was appointed Keeper of the Coins and Medals at the Paris Mint, which post he held throughout the Napoleonic era. Meanwhile, he was much in demand by other governments as a consultant. He struck patterns for Spain, the United States and his native Neuchâtel among others. In French coinage, the effigy of Napoleon as engraved by him appears both on the 20 and 40 franc gold pieces from 1804 through 1814. Droz was also responsible for the pattern of the 5 francs of the "Hundred Days" in 1815. Among his medallic work, the coronation medals for Napoleon in 1804 ("Medal Celebrating the Coronation of Napoleon I by Pope Pius VII at Notre Dame Cathedral in Paris") and several medals and jetons for the Bank of France are the most noteworthy.

Pierre-Joseph Tiolier (1763–1819), born in London, was appointed the engraver-general of the Paris Mint from 1803 to 1816. Tiolier engraved the patterns for the Bonaparte-First Consul coins. Tiolier was trained by his brother-in-law, the notable, Benjamin Duvivier. Many improvements of the coining machinery took place during Tiolier's tenure at the mint. His many medals and coins attest to his high skill. Tiolier's full signature appears on the dies he cut while coins bearing a "Tr" were from dies cut by others.

Thomas Wyon, Jr. (1792–1817) was an English medallist who died at the early age of 25. In both 1810 and again in 1811, he won the Society of Arts gold medal for medal engraving. In only four years, from 1811 to 1815, he rose at the Royal Mint from a probationer to chief engraver.

== Notes on varieties of Napoleon coins ==
After a competition among artists who submitted designs: Nicholas Guy Antoine Brenet (1773-1846), André Galle (1761-1844), Romain-Vincent Jeuffroy (1749-1826), the design by the Swiss, Jean-Pierre Droz (1746-1823) was selected. The coins were the work of Joseph Pierre Tiolier (1763-1819), who was appointed Chief Engraver of the Paris Mint on 1 April 1803. There were no reducing machines at the time and the entirety of the engraver's work was completed by directly cutting into the die face with punches and gravers.

In Year XI the government invested in a different method of minting pioneered by Jean-Pierre-Joseph Darcet (1777-1844). And in 1807, new minting equipment was introduced under the supervision of Philippe Joachim Gengembre (1764-1838), Inspector General of the Mints. This equipment, a Balancier Manuel (screw press) included a full ring (closed collar), produced slightly reduced reliefs. The general appearance of the coins is thus slightly modified compared to the coins struck by the prior methods.

In accordance with the Concordat with Pope Pius VII (1742-1823), signed 15 July 1801, a decree put an end to the revolutionary calendar. On 17 Brumaire Year 14 (8 November 1805) the Minister of Finance announced the return to the Gregorian calendar, which had been outlawed in October 1793, with effect from 1 January 1806.

Slight modifications in the portrait make it possible to distinguish the 1807 type from the preceding 1806 type; in particular, the variation is in the space between the rim and the top of the head. The 1807 issues are remarkable because the design was decided during Napoleon's absence. When he returned to Paris he was surprised to discover the new coins which were the result of the engraver's diligence. This is also considered a transitional issue, that is a coin struck after an official series ends, or before an official series starts. It can also refer to a coin struck with either the obverse or the reverse of a discontinued or upcoming series. These coins are a transitional issue because they were minted just before the 1807/08 issues (with laurel crown). The term "tête de nègre" sometimes used for these coins is a colloquial descriptor applied because of the frizzy appearance of Napoleon's hair as that of an African man.

A decree was announced by the Ministry of Finance on 5 August 1807, specifying the addition of a laurel wreath to the bust of Napoleon symbolizing the military victories of the Emperor. The decree of 22 October 1808, specified that for coins issued after 1 January 1809, the legend ― "French Republic" would be replaced by ― "French Empire".

1813CL- Tiolier was responsible for the dies for the Napoleonic coinage of Genoa (15 November 1811 through 1814).

1813Flag- the coining of French coins at Utrecht began on 16 November 1812 and did not continue beyond 1813.

1815 – the beading for the 1815 issue consists of 100 beads rather than the 103 beads used from 1809 to 1814. The 1815 coins show a greater distance between the eyebrows and the points of the "N" in Napoleon which are 2.4 mm for 1815 compared to 1.5 mm for earlier strikes. It is unlikely that at the time of the Emperor's return, Tiolier's original 20 francs dies had been preserved and thus, the dies must have been re-cut for the Hundred Days (21 March 1815 through 14 July 1815). The 1815 issue constitutes a discrete variety and the dies, signed Tr, were cut by Droz.

1815R (London) was struck in a lower relief, therefore, examples are difficult to find in better quality, yielding what is known as "condition rarities". On the obverse, the portrait is unsigned by the engraver, Wyon. On the edge, the word "SALVUM" appears to begin with the letter "Z" and the word "FAC" is not separated by a dot from the word "REGEM." On the reverse, the date is flanked by a fleur de lye, which was not a mark of any mint director, and the letter "R" which was not assigned to any French mint. The issue was considered counterfeit at the time of issue; however, it was authorized by Louis XVIII, in exile, and used for the payment of British troops serving in France.

Between 1802 and 1814 millions of coins were struck and they circulated heavily. The average daily wage in 1805 was 1.50₣ (US 27¢).

The coins carry mottos on the edges. Irregularities of the rims are acceptable and are not considered defects as they were caused by shifts of the coining collar and are characteristic of the edge lettering process. The edge letters are not sharp. There may be adjustment marks on the rims as well. The die axis was not well fixed and oscillates between 5 and 7 o'clock (as illustrated in the above photo of the An IX coin).

== "Coins, a reflection of the political events of 1814–1815" ==
In 1814 when Louis XVIII was restored to the throne of France (the Restoration), France changed its flag. Its coins, however, were merely modified to carry the king's portrait. There was a possibility that in modifying the coinage, Louis XVIII could have broken the reforms of the Revolution and returned to the duodecimal system and the livres of the Old Regime. But the new coins were struck with the same weight and fineness envisaged by Napoleon in the law of the 7 Germinal year XI, with one effigy (Louis XVIII) replacing another (Napoleon I).

== List of 20 franc French coin issues ==
All issues are 90% fine gold, have a nominal net weight of 6.45 grams and, have a diameter of 21 mm.

	Date	Mintage	Obverse legend	Reverse legend	Edge	Engraver	Notes
Bonaparte 1er consul	An XI to An XII	1,046,506 (XI= 58,262)	Bonaparte premier consul	République Française	Dieu protège la France (God Protect France)	Pierre Joseph Tiolier	First year of issue
Napoléon	An XII	428,143	Napoléon Empereur	République Française	Dieu protège la France	Pierre Joseph Tiolier	Intermediate bust
Napoléon	An XIII and an XIV	673,878	Napoléon Empereur	République Française	Dieu protège la France	Pierre Joseph Tiolier	Bare head; Revolutionary calendar
Napoléon	1806	996,367	Napoléon Empereur	République Française	Dieu protège la France	Pierre Joseph Tiolier	Bare head; Gregorian calendar
Napoléon	1807	594,332	Napoléon Empereur	République Française	Dieu protège la France	Pierre Joseph Tiolier	Bare head; transition type
Napoléon	1807 to 1808	1,725,753	Napoléon Empereur	République Française	Dieu protège la France	Pierre Joseph Tiolier	Laurel crowned head; République Française
Napoléon	1809 to 1815	14,283,710	Napoléon Empereur	Empire Français	Dieu protège la France	Pierre Joseph Tiolier	Laurel crowned head; Empire Français – note coins were struck in 1815 for both Napoleon and Louis XVIII
Louis XVIII	1814 to 1815	5,634,709	Louis XVIII Roi de France (King of France)	Pièce de 20 Francs	DOMINE SALVUM FAC REGEM (God Save the King)	Auguste-François Michaut	Uniformed bust – Some pieces were struck in London and are marked with an "R"
Louis XVIII	1816 to 1824	12,733,226	Louis XVIII Roi de France (King of France)	Pièce de 20 Francs	DOMINE SALVUM FAC REGEM	Auguste-François Michaut	Bare bust
Charles X type 1	1825 to 1826	771,932	Charles X Roi de France (King of France)		DOMINE SALVUM FAC REGEM	Auguste-François Michaut	Signature fine
Charles X type 2	1827 to 1830	919,535	Charles X Roi de France (King of France)		DOMINE SALVUM FAC REGEM	Auguste-François Michaut	Signature bold
Louis-Philippe type 1	1830 to 1831	2,371,848	Louis Philippe I Roi des Français (King of the French)	20 francs	Dieu protège la France	Nicolas Pierre Tiolier	Edge incused; this king held pro-Revolutionary ideals and therefore changed his royal title
Louis-Philippe type 2	1830 to 1831	included above	Louis Philippe I Roi des Français	20 francs	Dieu protège la France	Nicolas Pierre Tiolier	Edge raised/in relief
Louis-Philippe	1832 to 1848	6,761,231	Louis Philippe I Roi des Français	20 francs	Dieu protège la France	Joseph François Domard	Laurel crowned head
Génie 2nd république	1848 to 1849	2,843,007	République Française	Liberté Egalité Fraternité	* Dieu protège la France	Augustin Dupré	
Cérès 2nd république	1849 to 1851	17,293,983	République Française	Liberté Egalité Fraternité	* Dieu protège la France	Louis Merley	
Louis Napoléon Bonaparte	1852	9,857,428	Louis-Napoléon Bonaparte	République Française	* Dieu * protège * la * France	Jean Jacques Barre	
Napoléon III	1853 to 1860	146,557,145	Napoléon III Empereur	Empire Français	* Dieu * protège * la * France	Jean Jacques Barre	Bare head
Napoléon III	1861 to 1870	85,344,950	Napoléon III Empereur	Empire Français	* Dieu * protège * la * France	Jean Jacques Barre	Laurel crowned head
Génie 3 rd république	1871 to 1898	86,101,594	République Française	Liberté Egalité Fraternité	* Dieu protège la France (God Protect France)	Augustin Dupré	Génie ailé (winged genius) writing the Constitution on a blank tablet
Cérès/Coq (Harvest goddess/Rooster)	1898 to 1914	117,448,888	République Française	Liberté Egalité Fraternité	see notes	Jules Clément Chaplain	Edge 1 (before 1905): *++* DIEU *+ PROTEGE+* LA FRANCE; Edge 2 (after 1905): *++* LIBERTE +* EGALITE +* FRATERNITE

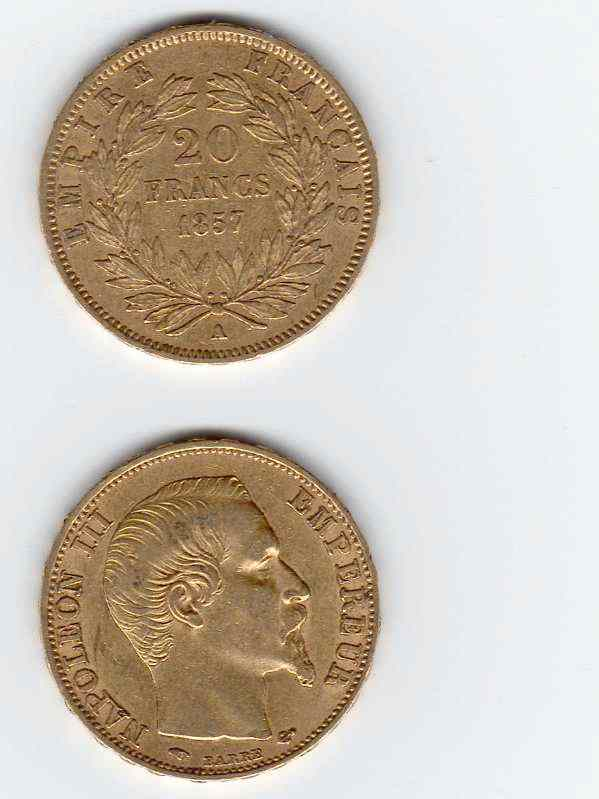
A 20 franc piece from 1857; portrait of Napoleon III

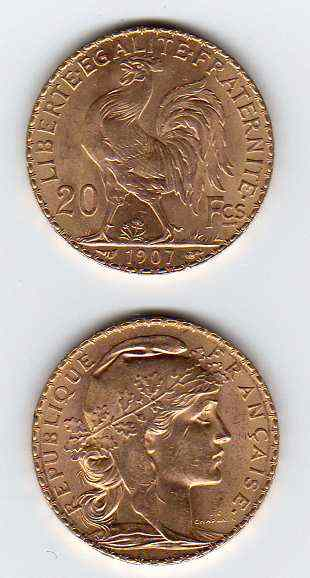
A 20 franc piece from 1907, Cérès, Third République

== See also ==
- Louis (coin)
- Vreneli
