= Auguste-François Michaut =

French sculptor

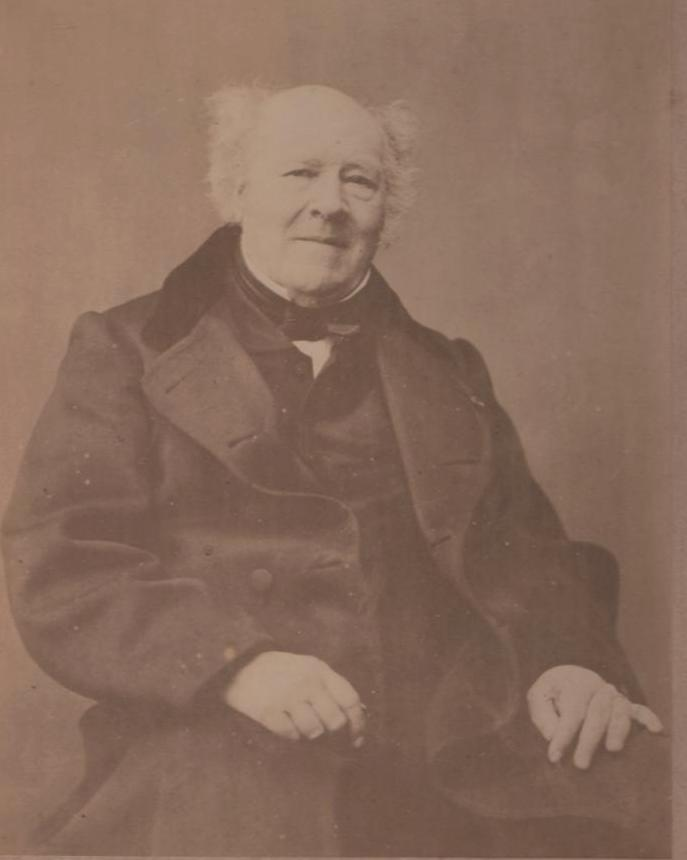
- Born: Auguste-François Michaut; 29 September 1786; Paris, France
- Died: 26 December 1879 (aged 93); Versailles, Île-de-France
- Education: François Frederic Lemot and Jean Guillaume Moitte
- Known for: coin and medal engraving, sculpture
- Awards: Prix de Rome, Légion d'Honneur

Auguste-François Michaut (1786 – 1879) was a French coin engraver of France and Holland, a medallist and sculptor.

== Early training as a sculptor ==
Auguste-François Michaut (Note: Spelling of the engraver's name: Among the various letters, certificates, articles AND different endings corresponding to this name have been found : Michaux, Michaud, Michault ou Michau. Actually, Auguste ended his signature on the coins and medals he produced with a T and on the documents relative to his identity and civil status (passport) Michaut is written with a T; his birth certificate with a T; but on his parents 's marriage certificate it ends with an X. Michot was his ancestors' name who were from Clamecy in Burgundy) was born in Paris in 1786 and was brought up in an artistic environment . His father Jean Michaut was a member of a craftsman association with Jean Baptiste ( Jean's brother). They owned a fine art foundry specialized in casting and chiseling, which was located in Paris, rue du Temple. In 1801 his mother died. By 1809 he had entered the École des beaux-arts de Paris where he primarily found himself very much inclined towards the practice of sculpture. At the time, he was the pupil of the sculptors François Frederic Lemot and Jean Guillaume Moitte. In 1809 he was admitted to take part in the prix de Rome competition but he suffered from a bad chest condition which forced him to give up sculpting altogether. He became a medallist instead. André Galle taught him the fundamentals of engraving; his signature was F.Michaut and a Roman lamp upon an anchor was what he used as a privy mark. During that same period he befriended fellowstudent James Pradier also one of Lemot's pupil. On 13 June 1813 he won second prize for the Grand Prix de Rome contest in the medal-engraving section, the subject being the French Hercules; the Academy had decided no first prize would be granted that year. He took part in the contest again the following year, but the jury members delivered their apologies to Michaut: one second prize only was to be awarded and he had already obtained it the year before; there was indeed no remaining award other than the Grand prix de Rome he could possibly acquire. Thereafter he was appointed by Napoleon the 1st's government to execute the medal L'aigle français sur la Volga under Dominique Vivant Denon's supervision. Auguste François's son, (Note: The son first followed his father's footstep, started out as an artist and was trained as a painter at the École des Beaux Arts de Paris, then he became a man of letters, he wrote a long funeral eulogy, as a tribute to James Pradier, following the latter's burial, who was his father's friend (Auguste Michaut, James Pradier, statuaire, Versailles, Imprimerie de Montalant-Bougleux, 1852). He married his niece, his step brother's daughter ( his step-brother being one of his mother's son born during her first marriage) by way of derogation from Louis Philippe I) Auguste Victor Michaut, was born on 19 February 1814 but he would only become his legal son ten years later when his father eventually married Jeanne Louis, his mother. She was five years older than Auguste François Michaut and had divorced from her previous husband fifteen years older than her in 1804.

== Coin-engraver for Louis XVIII ==
Medals and coins by Auguste-François Michaut

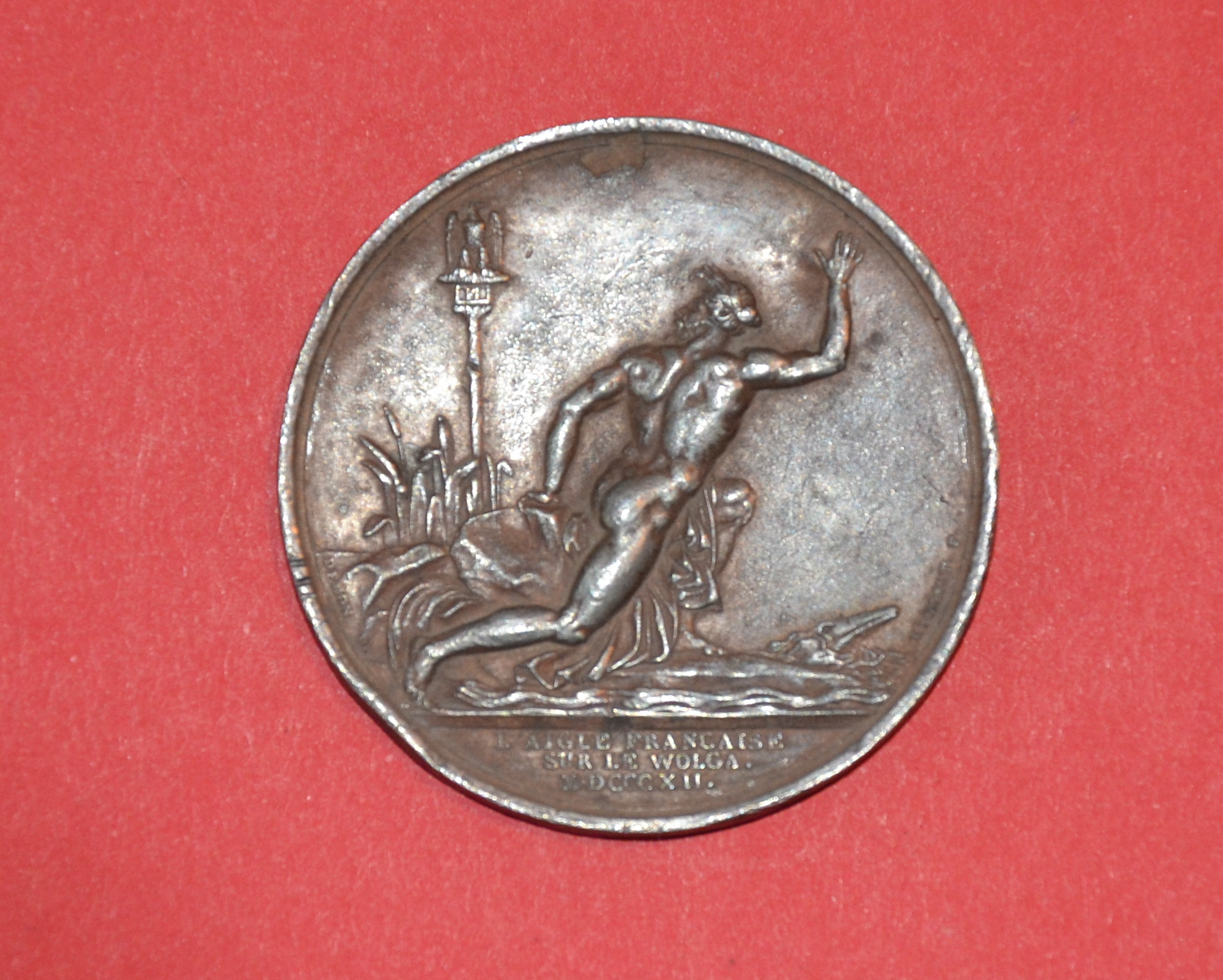
L'aigle français sur le Wolga.

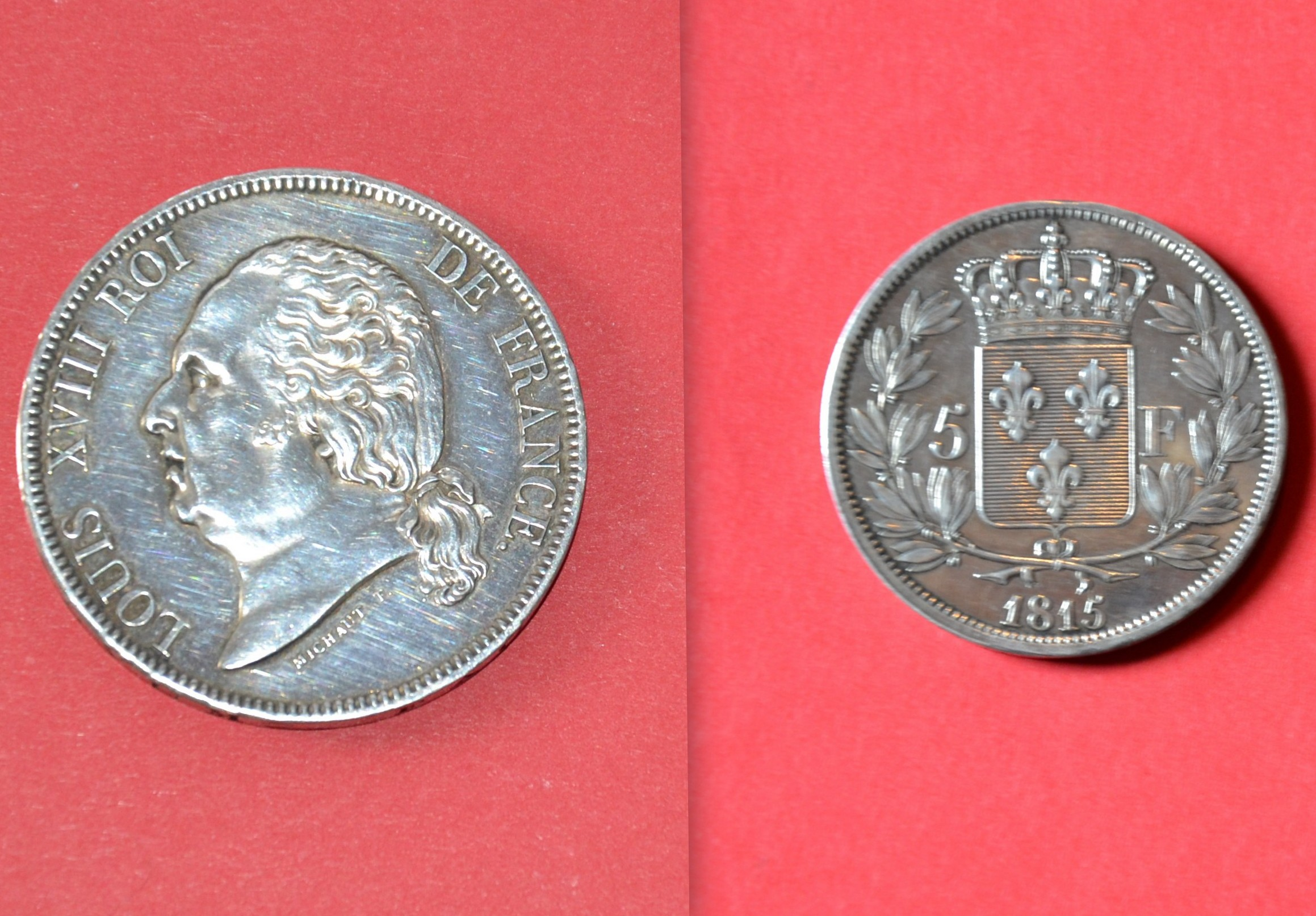
5 Francs Louis XVIII.

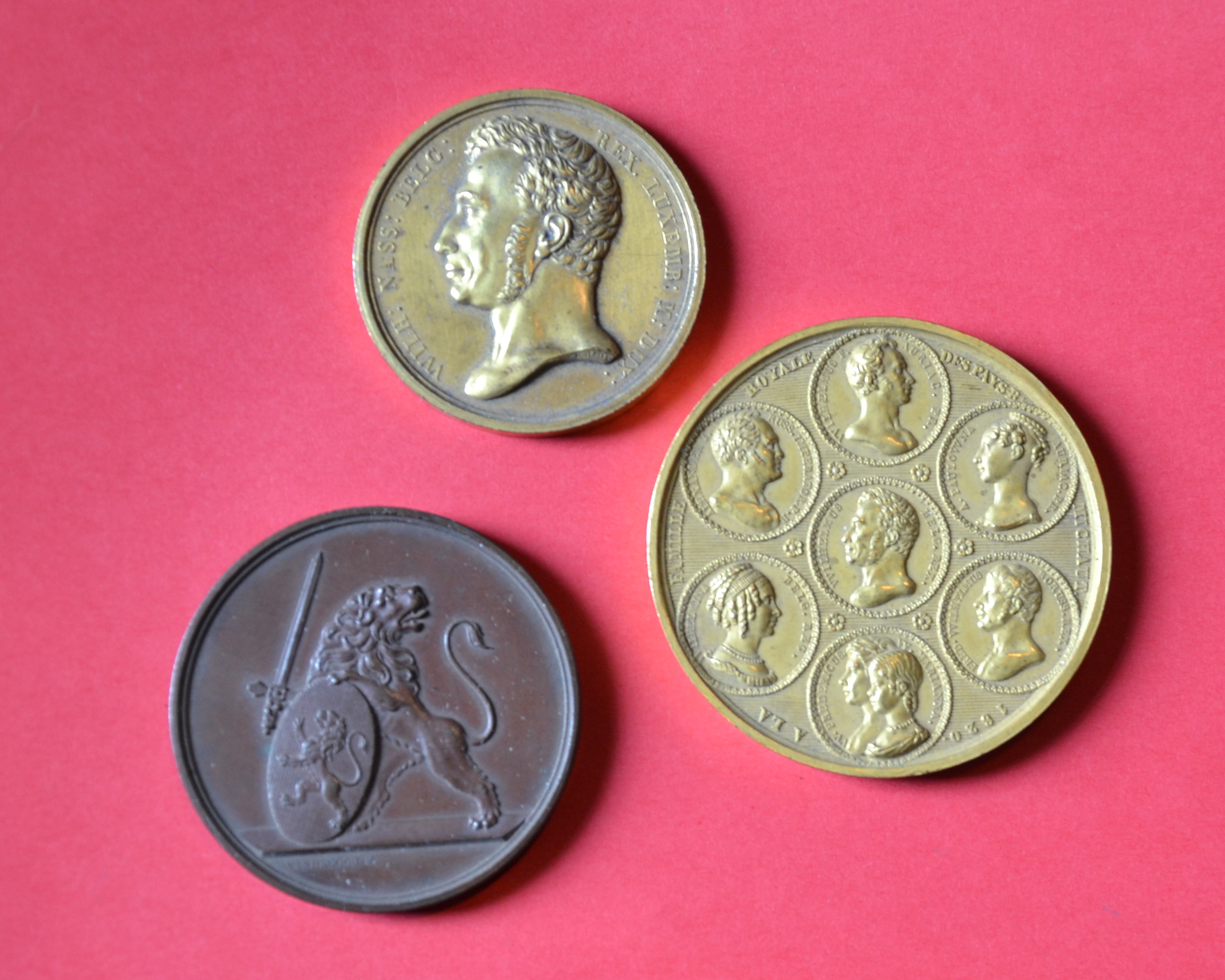
Medals William I.

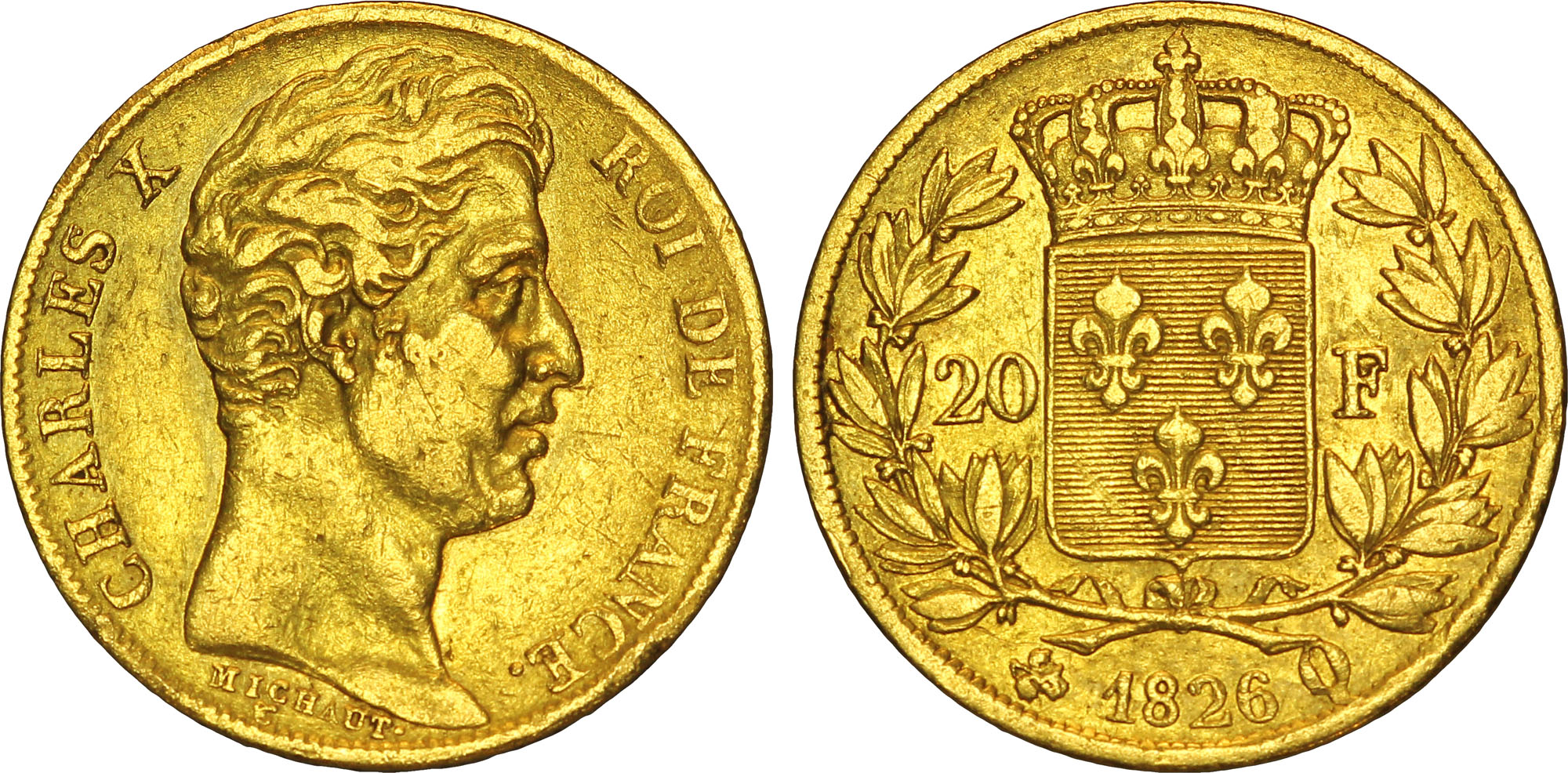
20 francs gold Charles X.

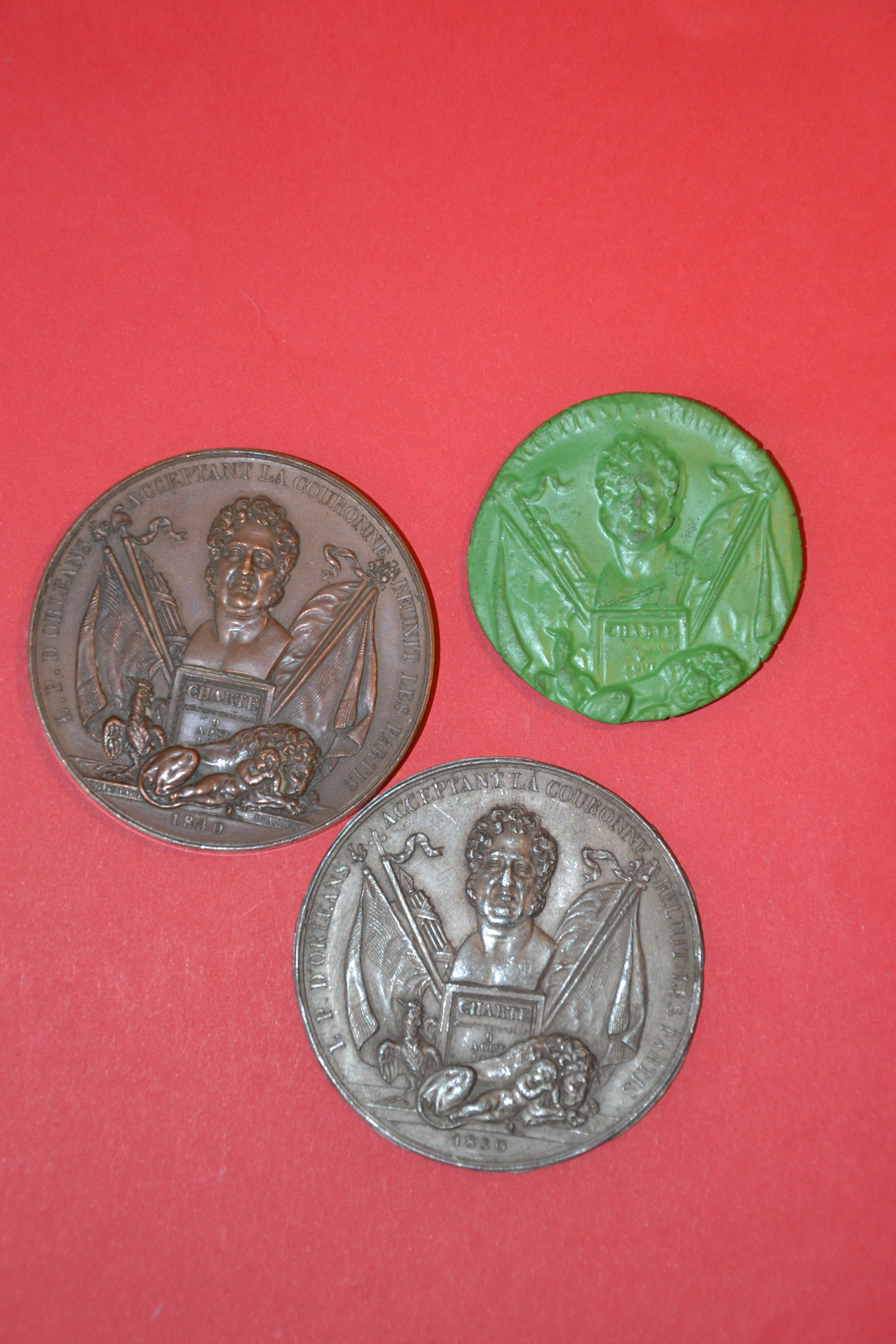
Accession to the throne Louis Philippe.

During the first Restoration, a competition for coin-engraving perfection was set up on 2 August 1814, which aimed to redefine the type of coins in use and henceforth to redesign the next monetary system. He won the contest over six older and more experienced medallists ( Bertrand Andrieu, Nicolas Guy Antoine Brenet, Jean-Pierre Droz, Nicolas Marie Gatteaux and Pierre-Joseph Tiolier) than he was; 9 December 1815 decree stated that Michaut's patterns should substitute the older ones and new coins be minted from 1 January 1816. The type he executed for a French five Franc coin ( écu) received great praise from the art critique Edmond About: " when this écu is thrown onto the counter of a tradesman without one being aware a masterpiece is being spent" and also from Thérèse Vallier as she celebrated engraver Hubert Ponscarmes, who said:«During the Bourbon Restoration, Glyptics continued to be considered important thanks to pompous academics. Michaut stood out as an exception. In a stroke of genius he shaped, with his écu featuring Louis XVIII, a truly wonderful piece of clarity and elegance».

== Court of Holland: success and fame ==
Thereafter Auguste François Michaut was called to the Court of Holland to execute gold and silver medals/coins, great official seals for the State and various medals. William I appointed him Mint-engraver and medallist to the Court for three years by a 4 October 1815 royal decree . He had his own accommodation within the Utrecht Mint (the Royal Dutch mint and thereafter in Brussels Mint (1817). He was assigned 2000 Gulden as official salary per year. On 9 December 1816 the king entrusted him with the die-engraving for 10, 3, 1 and 1/2 Gulden coins with the King's bust featured on them, while D. van der Kellen and A. J. van der Monde, the Utrech-based Mint-engravers were commissioned to strike silver and copper coins as well as gold ducats. Auguste-François Michaut signature occurred on the following coins:

- 1817: 10, 3, 1 and 1|2 Gulden,
- 1817: 3 Gulden, new type,
- 1818: 10 Gulden.

Furthermore, he produced several other medals including the one that celebrated the union of Holland with Belgium (1815). He was appointed as a member of the Royal Society of Fine Art and Literature (engraving section 1820) in Ghent, and also became a member of the Royal Institute of Holland. He had a portrait lathe imported for him to Belgium. This tool involved a process through which medal portraits could be replicated into smaller sized coins. It was invented by Anatole Hulot.

== France 1820-early 1830: medallist of the Dauphin ==
As soon as he returned to Paris he was appointed medallist of the Dauphin and on 28 April 1821 he was granted the Legion of honor by Louis XVIII; he received the award from M. Lemot's hand, the Master from the early years, in the" Ecole des Beaux Arts de Paris". But in 1821, his parisian apartment was devastated by a fire and he contracted serious injuries in his attempts to stop flames from spreading. He nevertheless continued producing numerous medals and his most successful productions were framed and exhibited at the Salons 1827 and 1831.

== Medals engraver under the reign of Charles X ==
By the time Charles X of France ascended to the throne, Auguste François Michaut had the idea of a medal he called "vows of the inhabitants of Versailles" that would depict the willingness of Versailles' inhabitants, willingness for the return of the King to the former royal residence. Meanwhile, a competition was opened to define how Charles's bust would appear on official medals. Nothing emerged from the first competition, in which he did not get involved. Another contest was then organized, he was requested to mint the 5 and 10 Francs coins of the new monetary system. Those personal favors from the government were met with a great deal of disapproval. Indeed, he was paid 44 800 Fr for the engraving of seven systems. In 1829, he was commissioned by the ministry of the Navy to engrave a medal for the privy council for colonial affairs whose theme was to be "Charles X granting the Charter to the Colonies". In addition, he executed a medal in association with James Pradier to Louis Philippe1st's glory on which the monarch's bust is portrayed among signs and banners representing the political parties of the days, alongside which the motto "for patriotism, he accepts the crown thus thwarting partys' plans". The medal is a dedication to the Republican national guard. He sustained serious injuries to his hands caused by the fire of his home, this had made the process of handling tools extremely difficult for him. He nonetheless endeavoured to overcome what constituted a major hindrance for him by entering a competition for Louis-Philippe's bust on medals but the king did not grant him the particular session that had been arranged for him by the Minister of Finance, judging every participant should deserve the same chance. Jean Nicolas Tiolier would execute the coins instead of Gallé, much to Michaut's dismay. In 1831, Jean Philippe Domart a former fellow student at the Beaux Arts won the competition. He offered to take on a medal curator position at the Mint then to become an Inspector-Auditor ( a position implying quality-check the Master-dies prior to them getting used for striking the coins ), he addressed to the Mint Administrator various letters concerning how medals should be kept, however his initiatives were unsuccessful. His medal-production slowed down from that period onwards. He retreated to Versailles, in les Chantiers area, rue de Vergennes.

== Final work as a sculptor ==
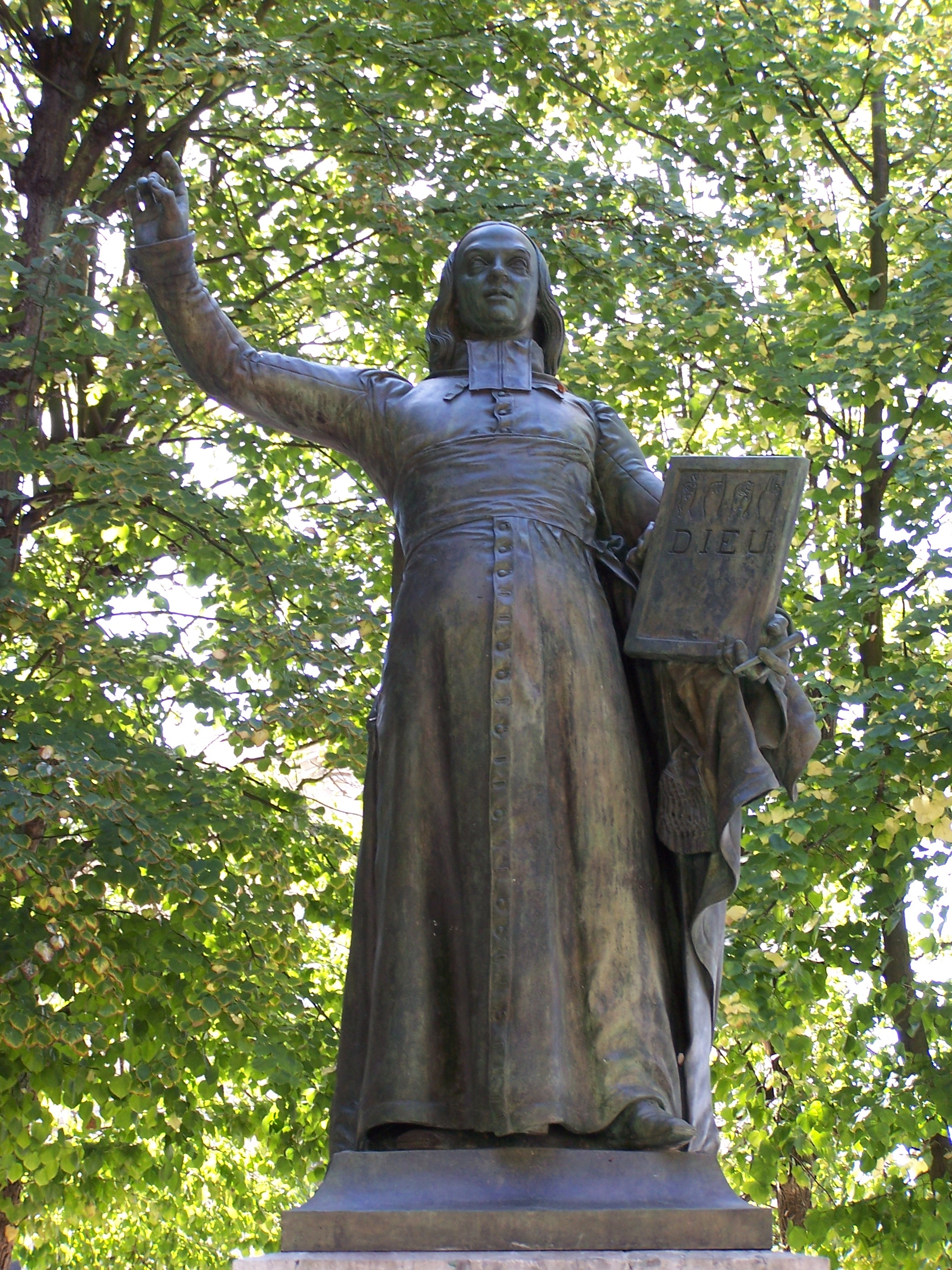
Monument to l'Abbé de L'Épée, 1843, place de la cathédrale Saint-Louis, Versailles.

He called himself "Michaut des monnaies " (Michaut of the Mint ) for he did not wish to be mistaken for a general called Michaux who fought the Napoleonic Wars and lived rue de Vergennes too. He made a living out of annuities, rents from the various apartments he owned in Versailles and Paris and a 300 francs yearly housing pension he had been benefiting since 1832 emanating from the Fine Art and Science Office attached to the Ministry of Trade and Public Works. His friendship with the Director of the Institute for the Deaf and Dumb, Desiré Ordinaire – who was an admirer of the Abbé Charles-Michel de l'Épée the founding father of free education for deaf and dumb children; he was also the inventor 1770, of the first language created based on a system of signs, – led him to produce his very last work . At first it consisted of a bust, however Michaut's father long illness took him away him from this project for a while. But in 1839, he started circulating an effigy of the Abbé he had executed . A commission was eventually constituted in Versailles, whose function was to supervise the making of " a monument à l'Abbé de l'Épée". Charles Michel de l' Épée was originally from Versailles and the monument was built to help raising funds for the Institute. He sculpted the statue and cast it into bronze at his own expense in 1843. The Abbé is represented standing while holding in his left hand a tablet on which is carved the word DIEU (GOD). His right hand is raised up as his fingers are shaping what stands for a D in sign language .

A. Michaut, later became involved in Versailles in local politics as a council member and he was there awarded a silver medal for this contribution. In 1859, he sculpted the bas-reliefs which were to be affixed on the base of the statue. The monument, which has been displaced many times, stands today on the site where it initially was, Saint Louis Cathedral square in Versailles.

Auguste-François Michaut died on 26 December 1879 at Boulevard de la Reine in Versailles.

== Works ==
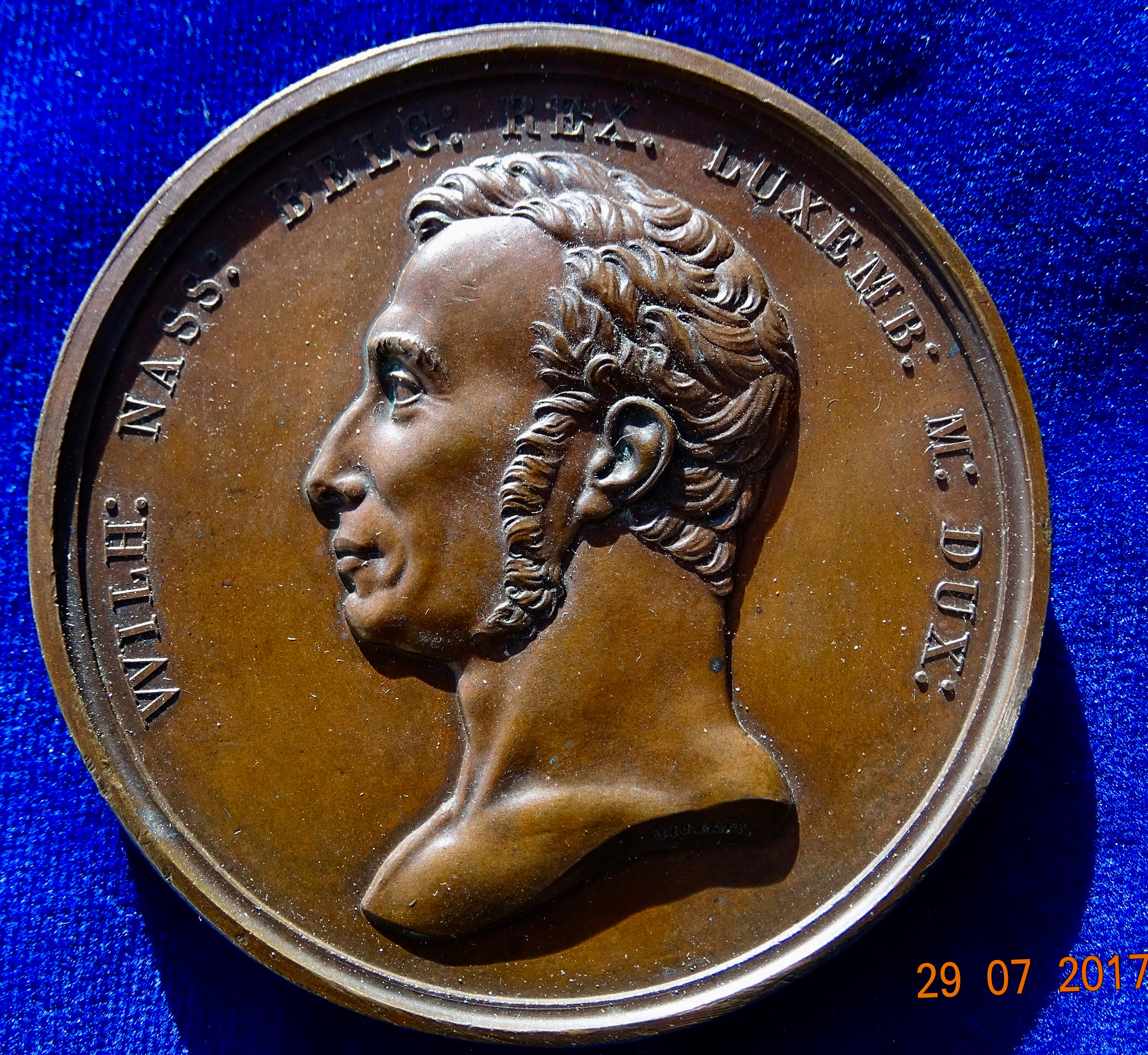
William I in March 1815 as king of Belgium & grand duke of Luxembourg on a medal by Michaut, obverse.

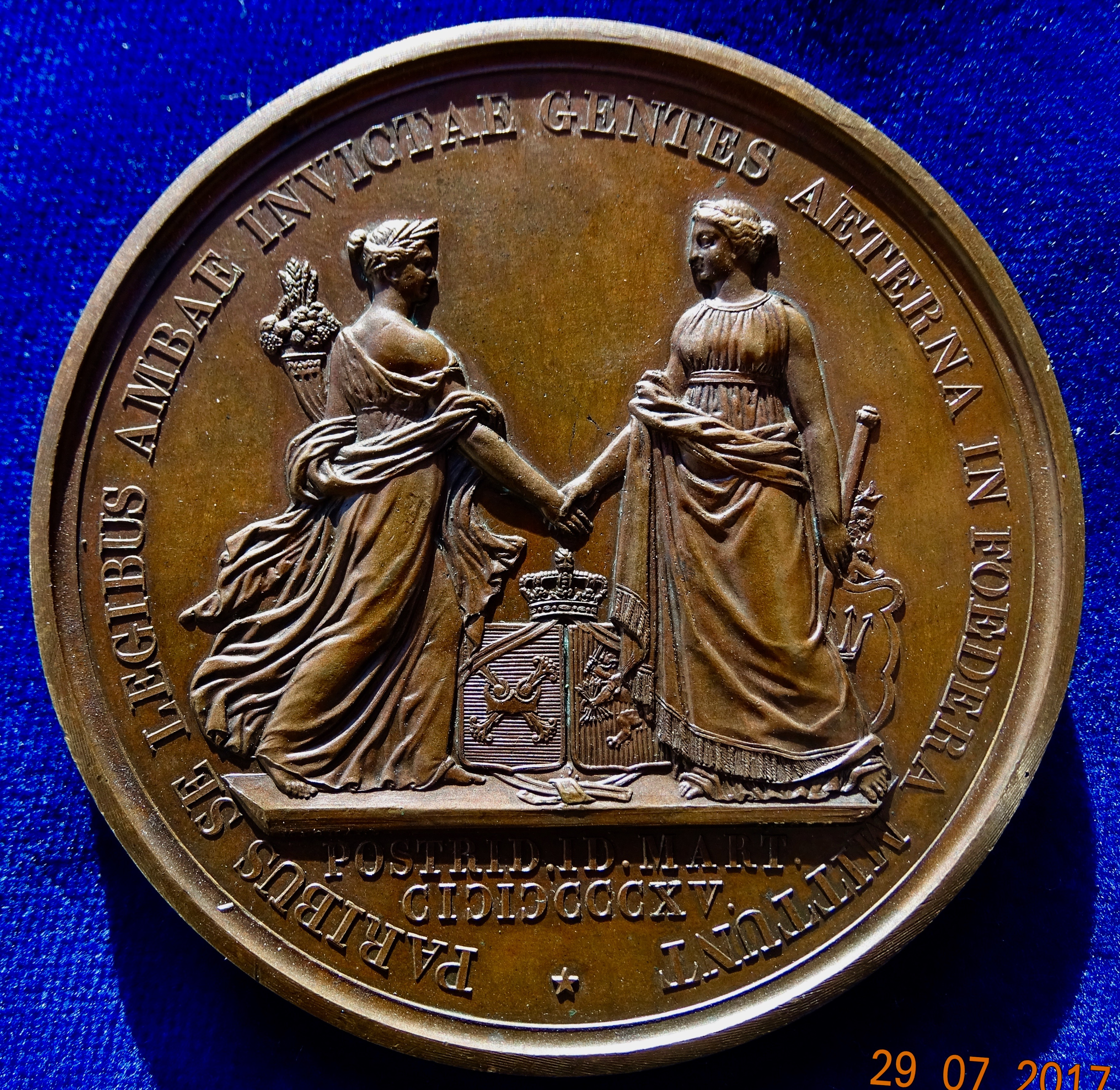
On the reverse of this medal the personifications of Belgium and Holland show clasping hands.

=== Coins ===
Napoleon (coin), Coins by Michaut

- Louis XVIII coins: 1 decime, ¼, ½, 1 franc, 2,5 francs
- Charles X coins : ¼, ½, 1 franc, 2,5 francs
- Gold coins : Louis XVIII Charles X, 20–40 francs;
- William Ist 1817, 10, 3, 1 and 1|2 Gulden; 1817, 3 Gulden, new type; 1818, 10 Gulden .

=== Commemorative medals ===
- Medals commemorating visits of the Mint :
    - Paris Mint : 1817 duke and duchess of Berry (2 Francs module ); 1817 duchess of Angoulême(5 Francs module );1817 : duke and duchess of Berry ( 5 Francs module, sev. var.)( 2 Francs module); 1818 Monsieur (Charles X) ( 5 Francs, sev. var.); 1822 Prince and Princess of Denmark(2 Francs module );
    - Lille Mint : 1814 duke of Berry ( 5 Francs module; several varieties); 1815 duke of Orléans ( 5 francs module);
    - Marseilles Mint: 1814 Count of Artois;
    - Ministry of Finance: Count Corvetto, Minister of Finance, 1817 ( 5 francs module ); M. Roy, Secretary of finance, 1820 ( 5 francs mod. ).
  - Medals in the Netherlands:
    - Large State Seals of the Kingdom of the Netherlands;
    - 1815, Union of the Southern and Northern States of the Netherlands;
    - 1815, Award for William the 1st;
    - 1818, In honor of Alexander the 1st, Czar of Russia
    - 1819, Medals of Merit NL- struck for the Mint of Utrecht, with a bust of William I. of Holland on the reverse, the decorated person or Institution 's name surmounted with a laurel wreath, engraved on the reverse (3 var.); in 1828 medals for H. Rotgans attributed on account of the fire fighting services in the Nieuwendijk gunpowder factory fire, attributed to W. van Leeuwen for his philanthropy, for Kaas Bolding, attributed for firefighting services in Nieuwendam; in honour of John Goldingham (1768–1849) attached to the service of the Company of East India in Madras; in 1836, one for Dr. Johannes Fredericus Kerst for the publishing of his works as a military surgeon.
    - 1820, In honor of the Dutch Royal family and their parents;
    - 1820, King William 1st and Queen Wilhelmina;
    - 1820, Anna Pavlovna, princess of Holland and married to William Frederick;
    - 1820, Queen W Wilhelmina, William1st;
    - 1820, Prince Frederik and Princess Marianne, Queen Wilhelmina and William 1st's son and daughter
    - 1821, Conquest of Palembang (Sumatra) by Dutch troops;
    - 1832, Return of the citadel in Antwerp by Dutch army led by General David Chassé to the French troops (siège de la citadelle d'Anvers). This medal commemorating the siege of Antwerp was a reward for the soldiers' participation in the expeditionary forces.
  - Medals in France :
    - 1812, Napoléon French Emperor and his son, the king of Rome
    - 1812, The French Eagle on the Bank of the Volga
    - 1814, Doctor Francois Broussais, writer of La médecine physiologique and another one in 1836;
    - 1814 Marie-Thérèse-Charlotte de France, Duchess of Angoulême, also named Madame Royale
    - 1816, Marriage of Louis of Angoulême with Marie-Thérèse de Bourbon in 1799
    - 1817, Restoration of the statue of Henri IV on the Pont-Neuf, 1817
    - 1818, Medal for the city of Rouen
    - 1818, Jean-Francois Ducis, poet
    - 1819, To Louis David's pupils
    - 1820, Commemorative medal of the Duke of Bordeaux;
    - 1823, Monument erected in Versailles in memory of duke of Berry
    - 1824, Restoration of the statues of the French kings
    - 1824, Versailles to Charles X
    - 1826, Versailles to Charles X
    - 1827, Octagon-shaped token for the Paris Notaries Society
    - 1827, French Colonies – Cour d'assises
    - 1827, Hyppolite Magloire Bisson
    - 1828, Jean-François Ducis
    - 1828, Prudhomme-Sénat and Conciliat
    - 1828, King's trip, Industry of Moselle
    - 1829, Cherbourg Embankment
    - 1829, Botanical Prize Medal, of Belgium
    - 1830, Louis Philippe accession to the throne
    - 1830, Constitutional Charter
    - 1830, Visit of the King in Versailles, viewing of the National guard
    - 1830, Embossing stamp -Headquarter Staff of Paris National Guard ( General La Fayette)
    - 1832, Token for the Company of notaries of Seine et Oise
    - 1833, Token for the Company of notaries of Marseille

=== Other works ===
- Statue of the Abbé de l'Épée
- Legion of honour: several Grand Croix insignia of the type called de Biennais with Henri IV's bust engraved in the middle

== Bibliography ==
- Charles Gabet, Dictionnaire des artistes de l'école française au XIXe siècle, 1834.
- Natalis Rondot, Les médailleurs et les graveurs de monnaies, jetons et médailles en France, Paris, Ernest Leroux, 1904, p. 394.
- L.Forrer, Biographical dictionary of Medallists, Londres, 1909, t.IV, p. 60.
- Spink & Son, The Numismatic circular, vol.62–64, Londres, 1954, p.c445.
