= Michaut =

Michaut is a French surname. Notable people with the surname include:

- Anne Michaut (born 1972), French sprint canoeist
- Auguste-François Michaut (1786–1879), French engraver, medallist and sculptor
