= Jacques Guay =

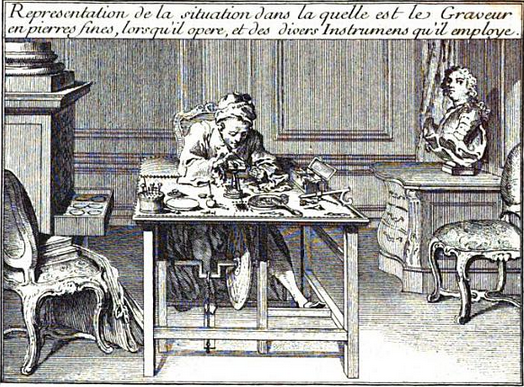
- Jacques Guay in his studio 1750
- Born: 1711; Marseille, France
- Died: 1793 (aged 81–82); Paris, France
- Occupation: Gemstone engraver

Jacques Guay (1711–1793) was a French gemstone engraver, a protégé of Madame de Pompadour (1721–1764), mistress of King Louis XV of France (1710–74). He was the most eminent gemstone engraver of his time, the official engraver of the king, and produced many cameo and intaglio engravings in semi-precious stones such as onyx, jasper and carnelian. Subjects included classical figures, events in the reign of the king and portraits of members of the court.

== Early years ==
Jacques Guay was born in Marseille in 1711. Little is known about his family or early life. He came to Paris at an early age and studied drawing with François Boucher. He met the rich financier and collector Pierre Crozat and studied his collection of 1,400 classical engraved gemstones. He decided to study the art of fine stone engraving. His first efforts were successful, but he needed formal training. He went to Florence in 1742, where he studied the antique stones in the grand duke's collection. He went on to Rome, where King Louis XV let him stay in the French Academy's building, and saw the best collections of classical antiques in Rome. He made several engraved stones while in Rome.

== Career ==
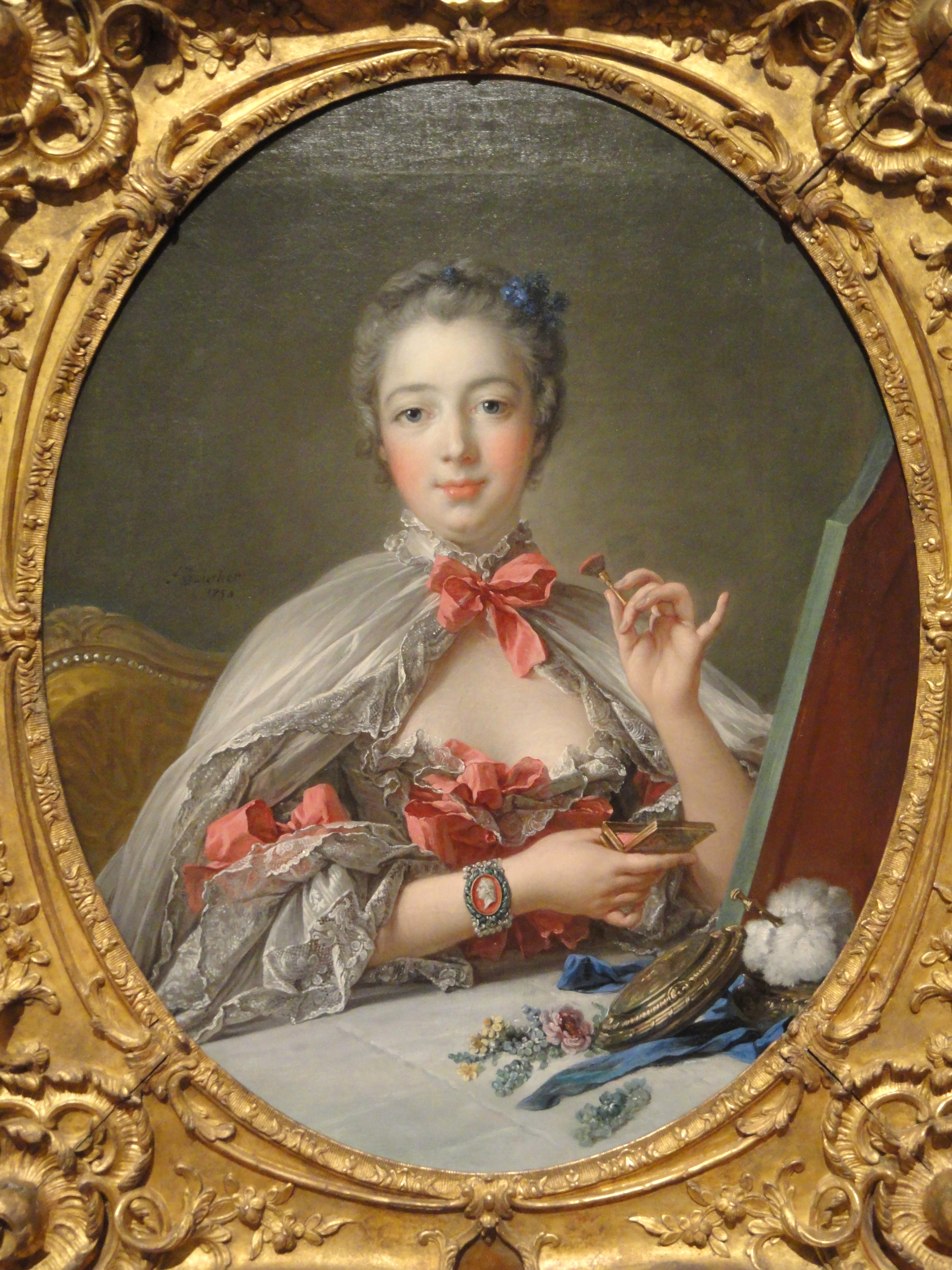
Madame de Pompadour at Her Toilette by Boucher (1758). She is wearing Guay's cameo of Louis XV on her wrist.

After Guay returned to France the king's mistress Jeanne-Antoinette Poisson, Madame de Pompadour, an artist in her own right, installed him in her apartment in the Palace of Versailles and charged him with making engravings in gemstones of the main events and characters of the reign. Guay made an engraving on a small carnelian of the Triumph of Fontenoy after a design provided by Edmé Bouchardon. This was the first of a series of engravings on historical subjects.

Guay was named graveur du roi (king's engraver) in 1745, and was granted lodgings in the Louvre. He succeeded François-Julien Barier (1680–1746) in this position. Barier, who had a minutely detailed style, was much inferior as an artist. Guay was agrée for admission to the Académie royale de peinture et de sculpture in 1747, the first gemstone engraver to receive this honor. He was formally admitted on 30 March 1748. He exhibited his work at almost all the Salons from 1747 to 1759. He taught Madame de Pompadour how to engrave stones, and she acquired proficiency as shown in surviving samples of her work in onyx, jasper and other precious stones. One of her works was of Victory, a self-portrait in sardonyx, which she had made up into a bracelet.

In 1753 Guay made a splendid cameo portrait of Louis XV in sardonyx. In a portrait of Madame de Pompadour by Boucher, exhibited in a Salon of 1755, papers at her feet include one of her print engravings after a cameo by Guay. A portrait of Madame de Pompadour at Her Toilette shows her wearing Guay's cameo of Louis XV on her wrist. Guay's miniature of Louis XV, cut from three-color sardonyx, was the basis for an etching of the king as a Roman emperor by Pompadour. One of the last of Guay's historical works was Wishes for the recovery of the health of Madame de Pompadour. There were two variants, one an intaglio in rock crystal dated 1764, the year of Madame de Pompadour's death. The work is incomplete since it could not be offered to its intended recipient.

Guay lost much of his importance after the death of the marquise. No more historical works by him are known, other than an allegory on the accession of Louis XVI dated 1774. Guay made some portraits for the new court. Jacques Guay died in Paris in 1793. (Note: Another source says Guay died in Paris in 1787, aged about 72.) A review of gem engraving published in 1819 said that "France, which at no time excelled in the number of good gem engravers has, ever since Guay's time, been particularly deficient in this class of artists, so that Millin (in 1797) considered the glyptic art as absolutely extinct in his country. There is however, at the present day, a skilful engraver in Paris of the name of Jeoffroy, whom the national institute has thought worthy to receive among its members." (Note: After Jacques Guay stopped working, Charles-Claude Flahaut de la Billaderie (1730-1809) tried to revive gemstone engraving. He promised to give the work to Romain-Vincent Jeuffroy (1749–1826) but did not keep his engagement. However, Jeuffroy engraved several portraits, which made his reputation.)

== Work ==
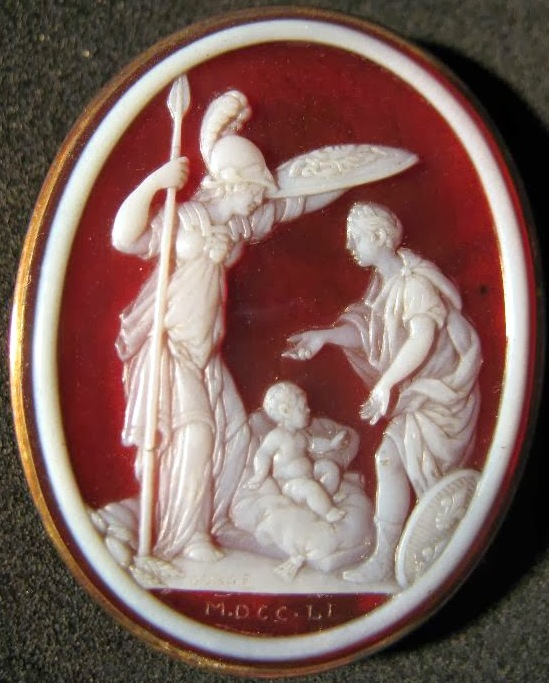
Cameo of Minerva and France protecting a newborn child (1751)

Guay's style is closer to the work of contemporary medalists and Rococo artists such as Boucher and Bouchardon than to the Roman masters of gem engraving. A record of Guay's work has been preserved in a collection of ink engravings by the marquise de Pompadour, reproducing Guay's stone engravings, and in drawings made as guides for his work by Guay himself, Boucher and Joseph-Marie Vien (1716–1809). The Pompadour collection includes fifty-two plates plus a frontispiece. Each plate is accompanied by a description of the subject represented. The prints were bound into a handsome volume that was given to favored members of the court. The collection includes eight intaglio copies of classical works made in Rome, mostly unsigned:

- Head of Octavius
- Le Lantin (Belvedere Antinous)
- Two fantasy heads
- Marcus Aurelius
- Plato
- Satyr
- Egyptian priest

Guay's engravings of historical subjects include:

- Triumph of Fontenoy (carnelian)
- Triumph of Fontenoy (jasper, 8 by 10 centimetres (3.1 by 3.9 in))
- Victory of Lawfeldt (intaglio, carnelian, after Bouchardon)
- Preliminaries of the Peace of 1748 (carnelian)
- Birth of the Duke of Burgundy (sardonyx)
- Wishes of France for the recovery of the Dauphin's health (cornelian)
- Thanks for the recovery of the Dauphin's health (intaglio)
- Death of the Duke of Aquitaine (intaglio)
- Alliance of France and Austria (cameo)
- Battle of Lutzelberg (intaglio, cornelian)
- Genius of France (intaglio, cornelian)
- Erection in Paris of an equestrian statue of Louis XV (cameo)

In addition Guay made various portraits of members of the court, notably his famous cameo of Louis XV.

Engravings by Madame de Pompadour of drawings by Boucher after works by Guay
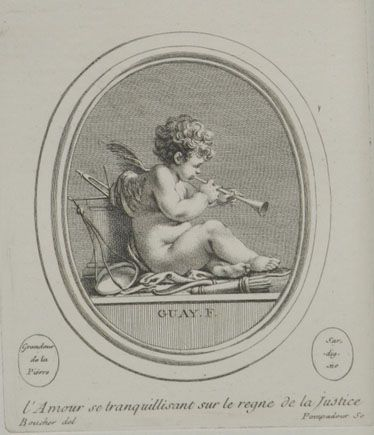
Amour at peace in the reign of Justice

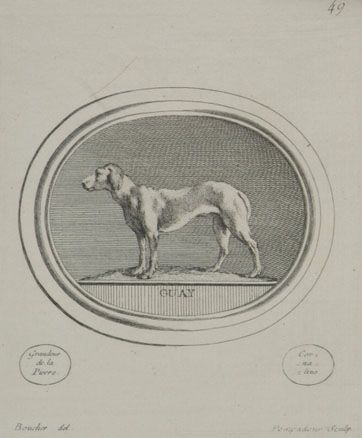
Dog

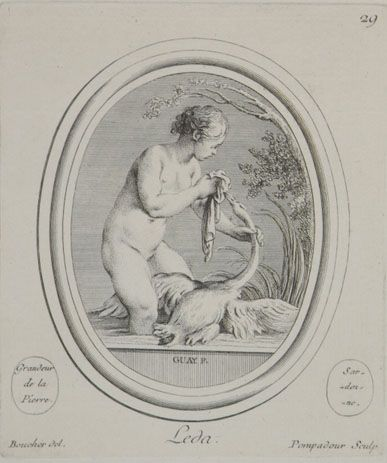
Leda

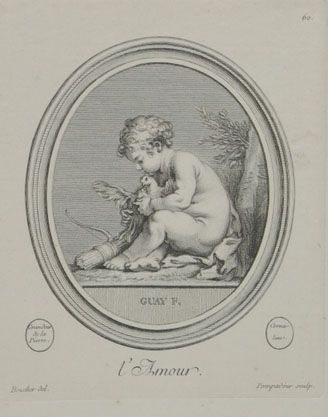
Amour

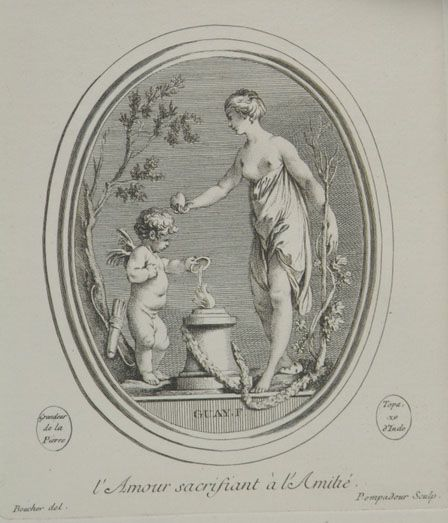
Love sacrificing to friendship

== Sources ==
- Algrant, Christine Pevitt (2003). Madame de Pompadour: Mistress of France. Grove Press. ISBN 978-0-8021-4035-7.
- Campbell, Gordon (2006-10-01). The Grove Encyclopedia of Decorative Arts: Two-Volume Set. Oxford University Press. ISBN 978-0-19-518948-3.
- Dussieux, L. (1850). Les Artistes français à l'étranger. Paris: Gide et J. Baudry.
- Hyde, Melissa Lee; Boucher, François (2006). Making Up the Rococo: François Boucher and His Critics. Getty Publications. ISBN 978-0-89236-743-6.
- Leda and the Swan, from Suite d'estampes gravées par madame la marquise de Pompadour d'après les pierres gravées de Guay, graveur du Roi, The Metropolitan Museum of Art
- Leturcq, Jean François (1873). Notice sur Jacques Guay, graveur sur pierres fines du roi Louis xv. Documents émanant de Guay, et notes sur les œuvres de gravure en taille-douce et en pierres fines de la marquise de Pompadour. Baur. p. 9.
- Michaud, Louis-Gabriel (1865). "Jacques Guay". Biographie universelle ancienne et moderne: histoire par ordre alphabétique de la vie publique et privée de tous les hommes avec la collaboration de plus de 300 savants et littérateurs français ou étrangers (2 ed.).
- Rees, Abraham (1819). The Cyclopædia: Or, Universal Dictionary of Arts, Sciences, and Literature. Longman, Hurst, Rees, Orme & Brown.
- Vardi, Liana (2012-03-19). The Physiocrats and the World of the Enlightenment. Cambridge University Press. ISBN 978-1-107-02119-8.
- Younger, Fletcher William (1897). Bookbinding in England and France. Рипол Классик. ISBN 978-1-141-52870-7.
