= Louis d'or =

French coins minted by Louis XIII

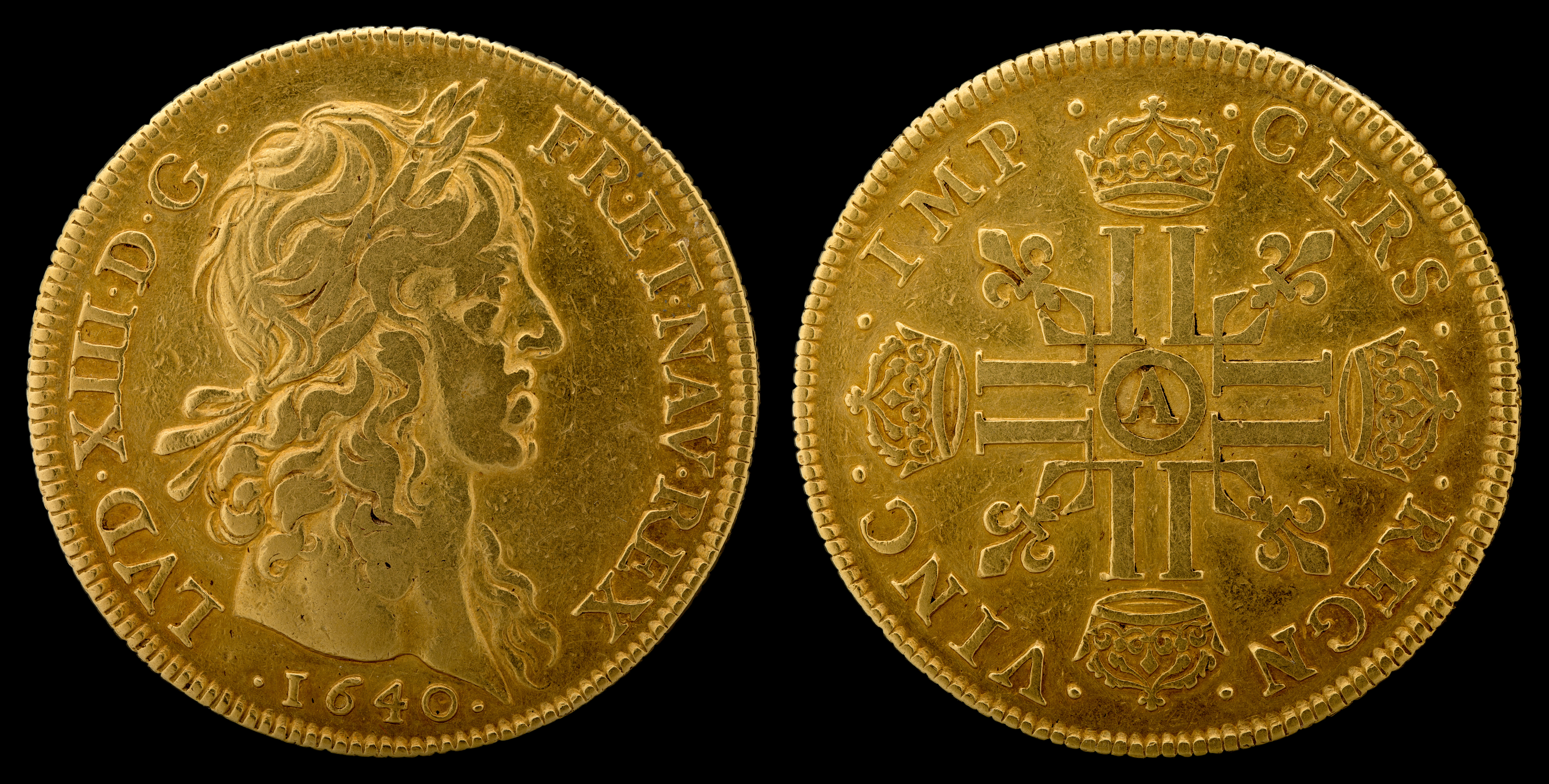
4 Louis d'or of Louis XIII (1640), first year of issue, Paris Mint. (Note: The 4 Louis d’or, issued only in 1640, contains (on average) of 0.9170 fine gold, and weighs 0.948 ounces.)

The Louis d'or (French pronunciation: [lwi dɔʁ], "golden Louis") is any number of French coins first introduced by Louis XIII in 1640. The name derives from the depiction of the portrait of King Louis on one side of the coin; the French royal coat of arms is on the reverse. The coin was replaced by the French franc at the time of the revolution and later the similarly valued Napoléon. The actual value of the coins fluctuated according to monetary and fiscal policy (see livre tournois), but in 1726 the value was stabilized.

The 1640 issue of Louis d’or contained five denominations: a half Louis and a one, two, four, and eight Louis. All subsequent issues through 1793 were only denominated in half, one, and two Louis.

== Louis XIII ==
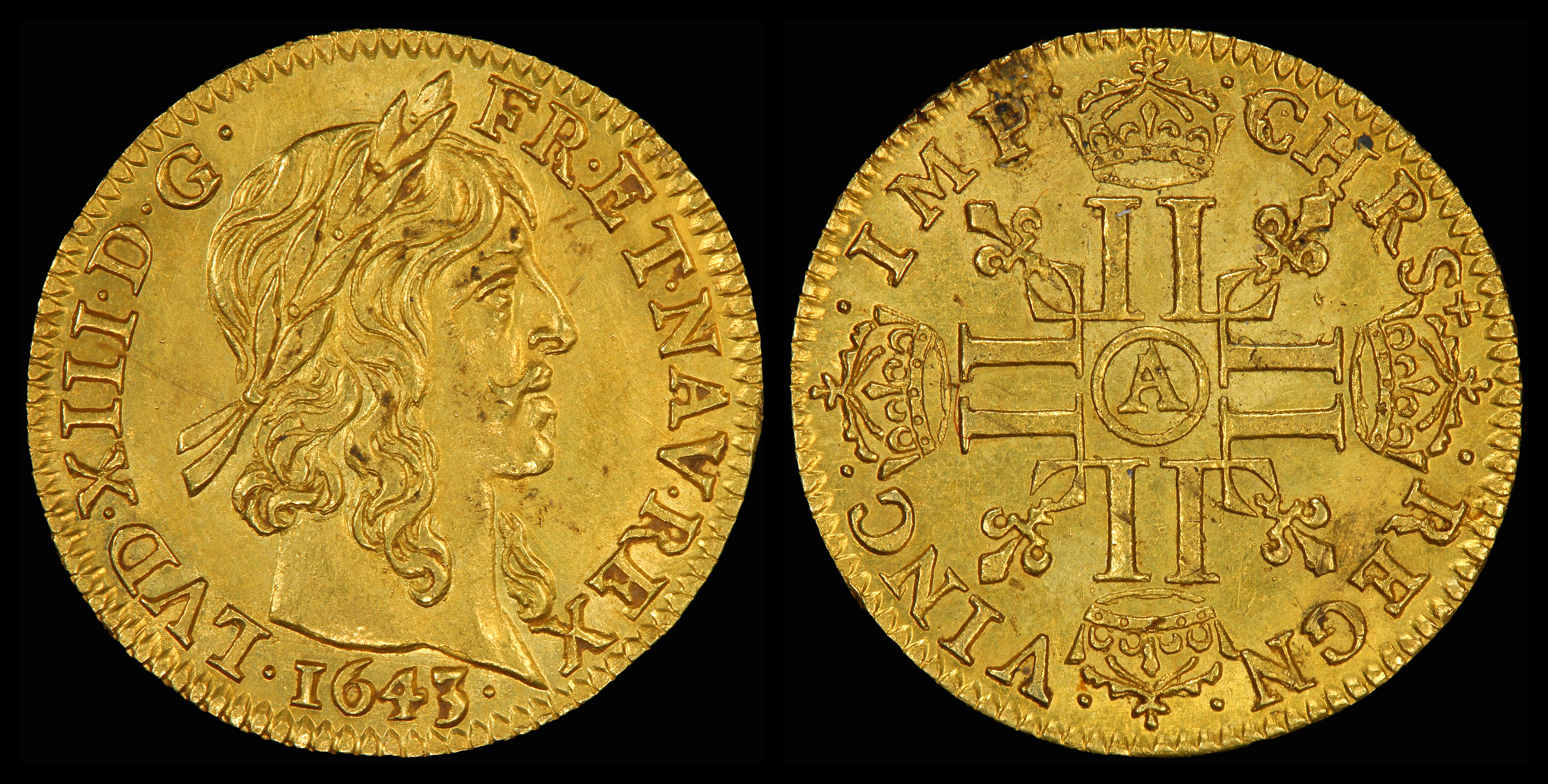
Half Louis d’or of Louis XIII (1643) (Note: The Half-Louis d’or, contains (on average) 3.34g of 0.9170 fine gold, and weighs 0.0985 ounces.)

The Louis d'or (a gold coin) replaced the franc which had been in circulation (in theory) since John II. In actual practice the principal gold coin circulating in France in the earlier 17th century had been Spanish: the 6.7-gram double escudo or "doubloon", of which the Louis d'or was an explicit copy. There also existed a half-Louis coin (the demi-louis d'or) and a two-Louis coin (the double louis d'or).

The Louis d'or fixed several problems with previous French gold coinage. Louis XIII previously struck coins from 23 carat gold even though Charles V had made 22 carats the de facto international standard for gold coinage a century earlier. Royal edicts had set the official values of his gold coins so low that it was profitable to export them. Since they were still made by hand, cheaters could shave bits of gold from the edges of the coins before passing them on, an illegal process called clipping. To fix this, Jean Varin, a medalist from Liège, installed machinery in the Paris mint which made perfectly round coins so that clipping could not go undetected. The new demi Louis d'or maintained the weight of the old écu d’or, but decreasing its fineness to 22 carats, allowing it to circulate at a value of five livres. Its double, the Louis d'or, had the weight and fineness of the Spanish pistole, or two escudo coins, which was an international trade currency.

Smaller values were available through a number of silver coins – the écu (sometimes called the louis d'argent), also available in 1/2, 1/4 and 1/8 écu denominations (60, 30 and 15 sous) – and copper coins: sous (s.) and deniers (d.).

The Louis d'or under Louis XIII had a dimension of about 25 mm, and a weight of 6.75 g.

- Recto: the king's head turned to the right with the motto "LVD XIII DG – FR ET NAV REX" (LVDOVICVS XIII DEI GRATIA FRANCIAE ET NAVARRAE REX "Louis XIII, by the grace of God king of France and of Navarre").
- Verso: the royal monogram (4 double "L"s surmounted by a crown with fleur de lis) and the motto "CHRS REGN VINC IMP" (CHRISTVS REGNAT VINCIT IMPERAT "Christ reigns, conquers and commands").
- Engraver: Jean Varin (1604–1672)

The double louis has a size of 28.5 mm and a weight of 13.47 g. The quatruple louis has a size of 35 mm and a weight of 26.88 g. The 10 louis has a size of 44 mm and a weight of 66.87 g. One of these was sold in 2012 for 210,000 euros, which makes it the most expensive French coin of any time. The half louis has a size of 20 mm and a weight of 3.34 g.

== Louis XIV ==
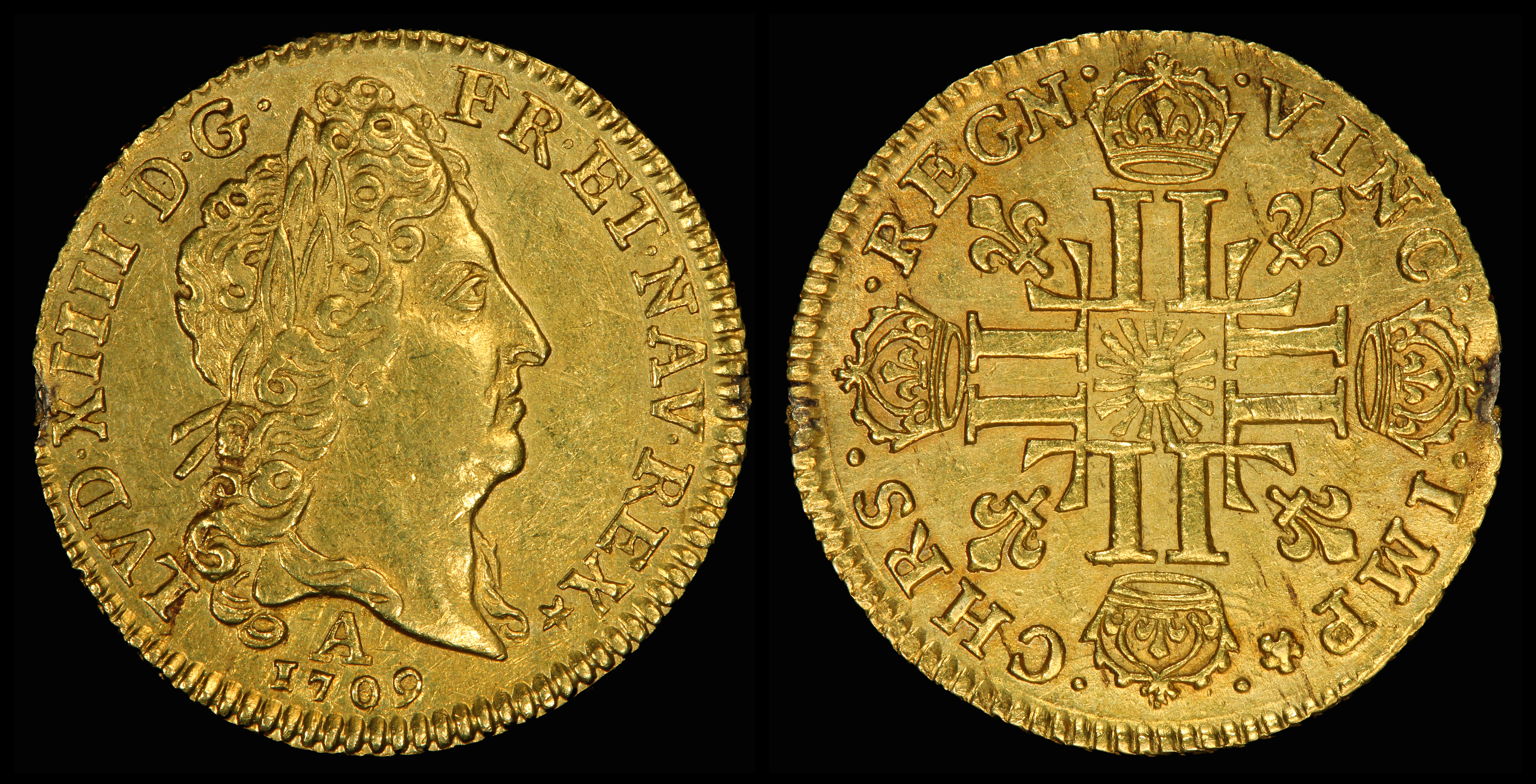
Louis d’or of Louis XIV (1709)

The Louis d'or under Louis XIV was similar in most respects to its predecessor and had a dimension of +/- 25 mm, and a weight of 6.75 g.

- Recto: the king's head turned to the right with the motto "LVD XIIII DG – FR ET NAV REX" (LVDOVICVS XIIII DEI GRATIA FRANCIAE ET NAVARRAE REX "Louis XIV, by the grace of God king of France and of Navarre").
- Verso: the royal monogram (4 double "L"s surmounted by a crown with fleur de lis) and the motto "CHRS REGN VINC IMP" ("Christ reigns, defeats and commands").
- Engraver: Jean Varin (1604–1672)

== Louis XV ==
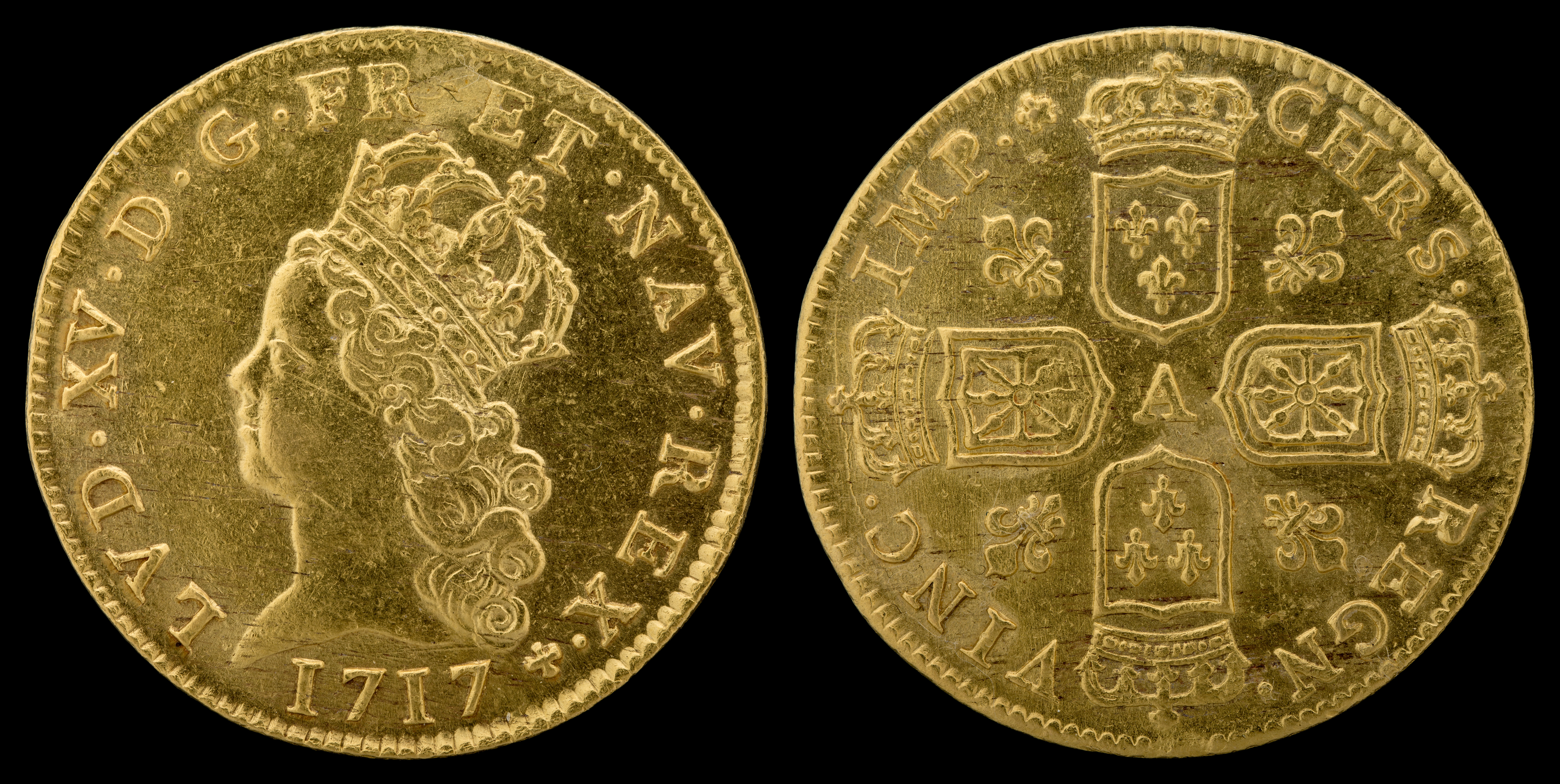
2 Louis d’or of Louis XV (1717) (Note: The 2 Louis d’or contains (on average) 12.235g of 0.9170 fine gold, and weighs 0.3607 ounces.)

Under Louis XV, mintage of the Louis d’or was at first reduced while John Law introduced paper money. After Law's system failed and Cardinal Fleury became Louis XV's chief magistrate in 1726, France returned to a policy of sound money and the mintage of the Louis d’or returned to normal levels. The weight of the Louis d’or was now increased to 8.1580 g and gold content of 0.2405 troy oz, it was revalued at 20 livres (₶.), and a commitment was made to maintain this valuation. This promise was kept until 1740 when the louis d’or was revalued to 24 ₶., thereby effecting a 20% devaluation of the livre. This was the last devaluation until the French revolution replaced the louis d’or by the franc.

- Recto: Crowned young head. Notable changes were made to the portrait when the weight of the Louis d’or was stabilized in 1726 and when it was revalued in 1740.
- Verso: The early coinage of Louis XV has a variety of rapidly changing reverse types. When the value of the Louis d’or was stabilized in 1726, a reverse type with the coats of arms of France and Navarre in two ovals was adopted. This reverse earned the coin the nickname "Louis aux lunettes", i.e. Louis with glasses.
- Engraver: Norbert Roettiers (1703–1748)

== Louis XVI ==
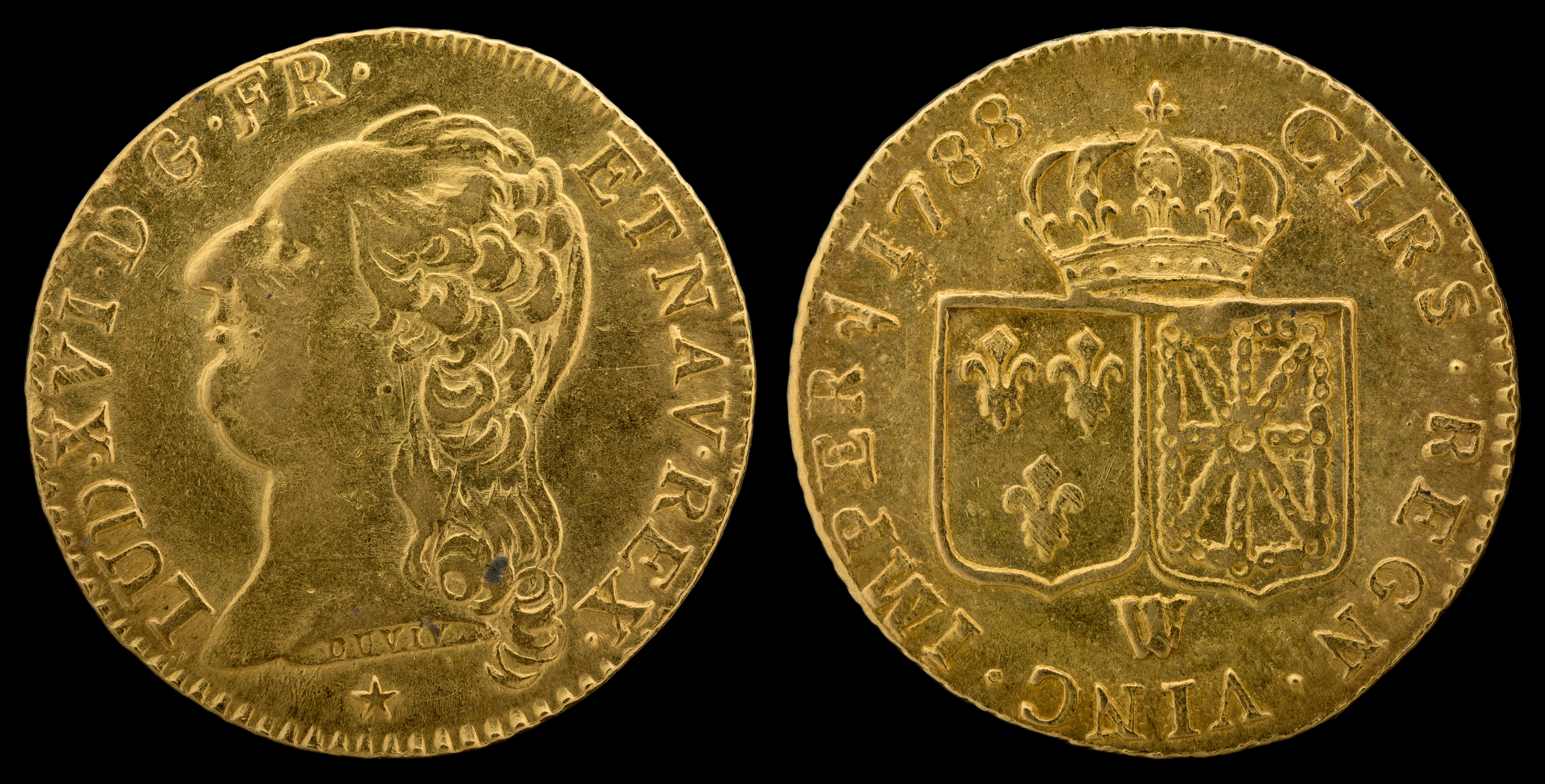
Louis d’or of Louis XVI (1788)

The Louis d'or under Louis XVI was minted between 1785 and 1792 and had a dimension of 23 mm, and a weight of 7.6490 g, a fineness of 0.917, and gold content of 0.2255 troy oz. The double louis has a size of 28.5 mm and a weight of 15.26 g.

- Recto: the king's head turned to the left with the motto "LVD XVI DG – FR ET NAV REX" (LVDOVICVS XVI DEI GRATIA FRANCIAE ET NAVARRAE REX "Louis XVI, by the grace of God king of France and of Navarre").
- Verso: Crowned arms of France and Navarre.
- Engraver: B. Duvivier

== Louis d'or "constitutionnel" ==
During the French Revolution there was a coin named the "Louis d'or constitutionnel", a coin of the French First Republic. Engraved on the coin is "24 livres".

== Louis XVIII ==
Contrary to what one might expect, the 20-franc gold coin under Louis XVIII was not a Louis d'or but a Napoléon gold coin. Because of the new monetary law under Napoleon I, all the 20 francs gold coins from Napoleon I to the 20-franc "coq" are Napoleon gold coins.

== Royal Canadian Mint issues ==
In July 1725, the ship Chameau left France for Quebec, carrying dozens of military and political VIPs and a fortune in gold and silver, but sank near the end of the voyage. In 1961, a discovery of cannons scattered on the sea bottom alerted Alex Storm, a diver working part-time on a fishing trawler from Louisbourg. Storm carefully mapped the wreckage of the Chameau to locate the treasure compartment. In 1965, after several years of searching, the gold was found and the mystery of the treasure was solved.

The Royal Canadian Mint commemorated this by creating a 1/20th ounce gold coin. The coin was released in October 2006 and was composed of 99.99% pure gold. Its face value was one Canadian dollar and had a limited mintage of 10,000 coins. This numismatic coin, named the Gold Louis, had a weight of 1.555 grams and a diameter of 14.1 mm. Obverse: Queen Elizabeth II. Reverse: the royal monogram (4 double "L"s) surmounted by a crown with fleur de lis and the motto "CHRS REGN VINC IMP" (Christus regnat, vincit, et imperat. Latin > "Christ reigns, conquers and commands"). Engravers: Royal Canadian Mint engravers.

== See also ==
- Friedrich d'or
- Napoléon (coin)
