= André Galle =

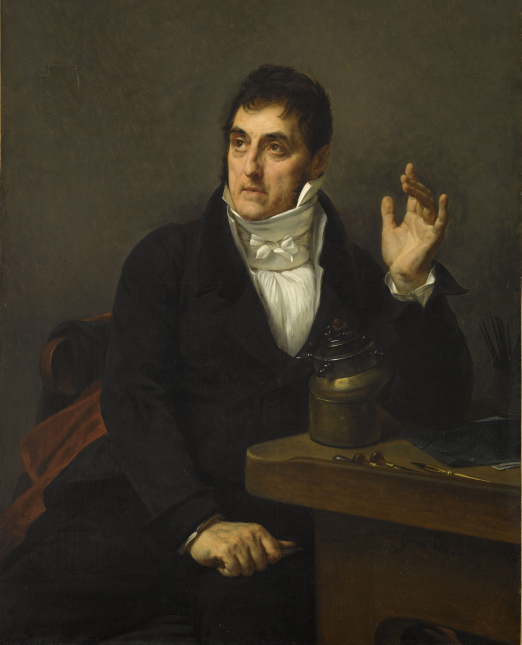
- André Galle (1822), portrait by Antoine-Jean Gros
- Born: 27 May 1761
- Died: 22 December 1844 (aged 83); Paris, France
- Known for: Engraving

André Galle (27 May 1761, Saint-Étienne – 21 December 1844, Paris) was a French engraver and medallist. In 1829, he patented a type of roller chain, known as a leaf chain, which is still used for low-speed, heavy duty applications. It was not put into production during his lifetime.

== Biography ==
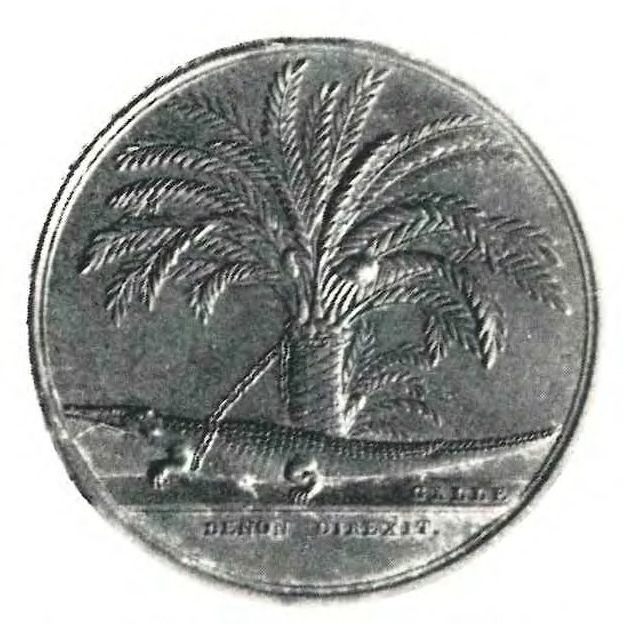
The Conquest of Egypt

André's father was an engraver who specialized in decorating rifles. Unable to support his family in Saint-Étienne, he relocated to Lyon, where André became an apprentice in a button factory, but also received drawing lessons. His work attracted the attention of a local artist named Bergeon, who helped him gain admission to the Academy of Lyon. At the factory, his problem-solving and technical abilities led to his being named a partner. In 1779, aged only eighteen, he married Marie-Catherine, née Lejeune.,

After the factory owner and his wife had died, Galle became the company's sole proprietor. He focused on the engraving and production of medals, and became a Master Engraver in 1785. Four years later, he opened his own engraving studio, where he appears to have specialized in seals and stamps for various Revolutionary organizations.

In 1792, as a result of these activities, the City of Lyon appointed him a delegate to Paris, to discuss the use of metal from bells. There, he produced two coins from bell metal, one of which depicted Mirabeau, an early leader of the Revolution. This prompted the Committee of Public Safety to commission a medal of Hercules and the Hydra; symbolizing the French people destroying the Monarchy.

He decided to remain in Paris; working with Augustin Dupré, the Engraver General of coins and medals. Later, he would produce a series of medals celebrating the French campaign in Egypt and Syria and, in collaboration with Romain-Vincent Jeuffroy, one for the occasion of Napoleon's coronation as Emperor.

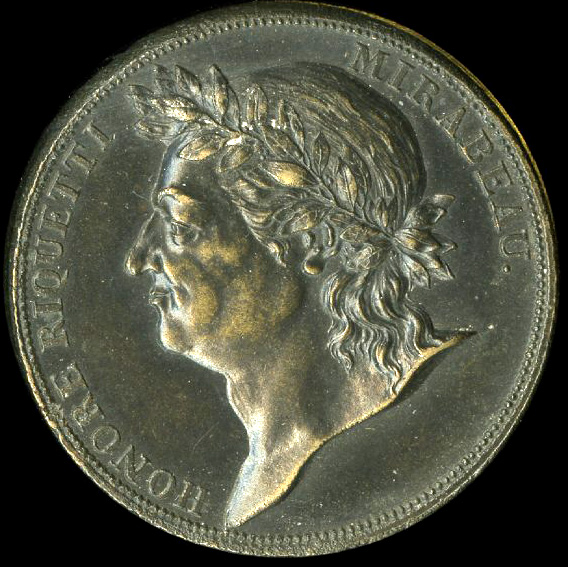
A portrait of Mirabeau

His later career is largely marked by a series of awards and appointments. In 1809, he obtained one of the Prix décennaux, established by Napoleon and awarded by the Institut de France. In 1819, he was elected to the Académie des Beaux-Arts, where he took Seat #3 for engraving. His students there included Eugène André Oudiné, and his own grandson, André Vauthier-Galle. In 1826, he was named a Knight in the Legion of Honor. Six months before his death, he was made a corresponding member of the National Institute for the Promotion of Science in Washington, D.C.
