= Nicolas-Pierre Tiolier =

French sculptor and engraver (1794–1843)

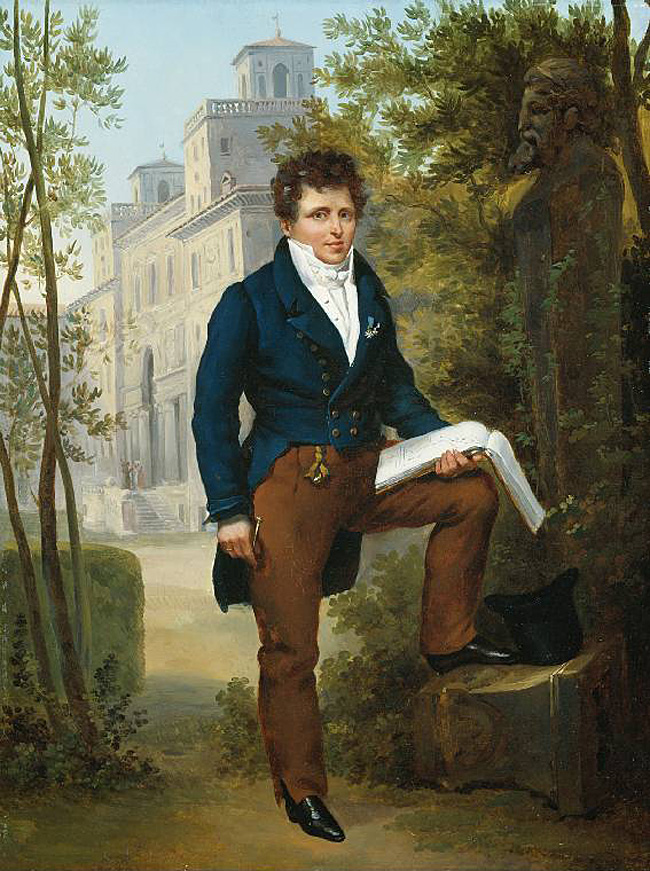
- Nicolas-Pierre Tiolier by François-Édouard Picot c. 1817, in front of Villa Medici where Tiolier lived.
- Born: 9 May 1784; Paris, France
- Died: 25 September 1843 (aged 59); Paris, France
- Occupations: Sculptor and engraver of coins and medals

Nicolas-Pierre Tiolier (9 May 1784 – 25 September 1843) was a French sculptor and engraver of coins and medals.

== Life ==
Nicolas-Pierre Tiolier was the son of Pierre-Joseph Tiolier (1763–1819). He was born in Paris. He was a pupil of his father and of the engraver Romain-Vincent Jeuffroy (1749–1826) and the sculptor Claude Dejoux (1732–1816). The first competition of the Prix de Rome was for a stone engraving of the seated Emperor Napoleon crowned with laurels. On 25 June 1805 Nicolas-Pierre Tiolier, the sole candidate, won the prize. As a prize winner, Tiolier lived at the Villa Medici in Rome from 1806 to 1811. He made a portrait of Raphael.

Nicolas-Pierre Tiolier succeeded his father as 16th general engraver of coins in September 1816. He held his position until the end of December 1842. Tolier was a Freemason. He was knighted in 1821. He engraved the seals of Louis XVIII, Charles X, and the Order of the Holy Spirit, and also engraved medals for Louis-Philippe. Besides engraving coins and medals, Tiolier was a sculptor and engraver in stone. He was made a knight of the Legion of Honor in July 1825.

Tiolier died in Paris in 1843 and is buried in the 25th division of the Père Lachaise Cemetery. He was succeeded as Graveur Général by Jacques-Jean Barre. He had one son and one daughter, but they left no descendants.

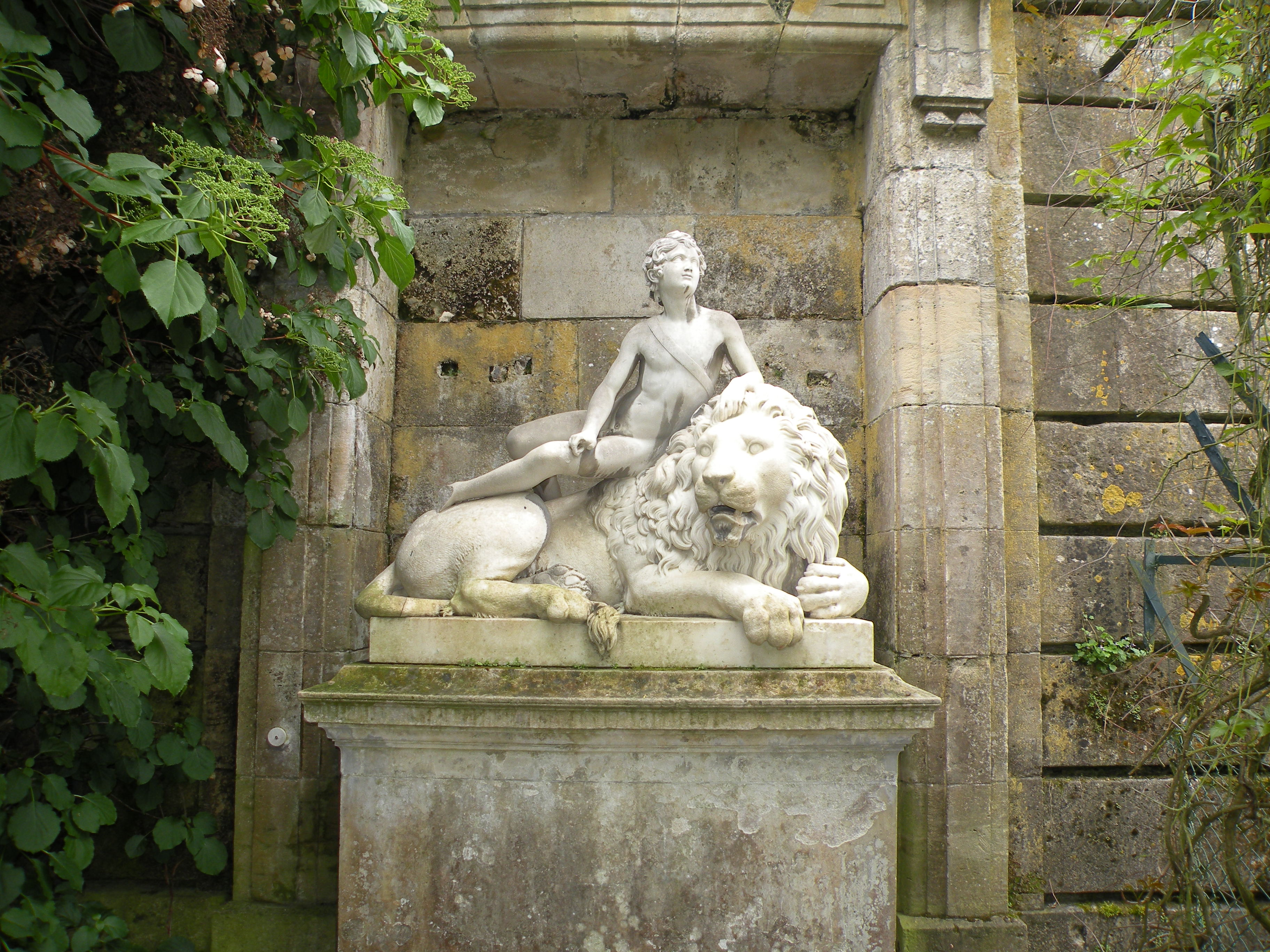
Force enslaved by love

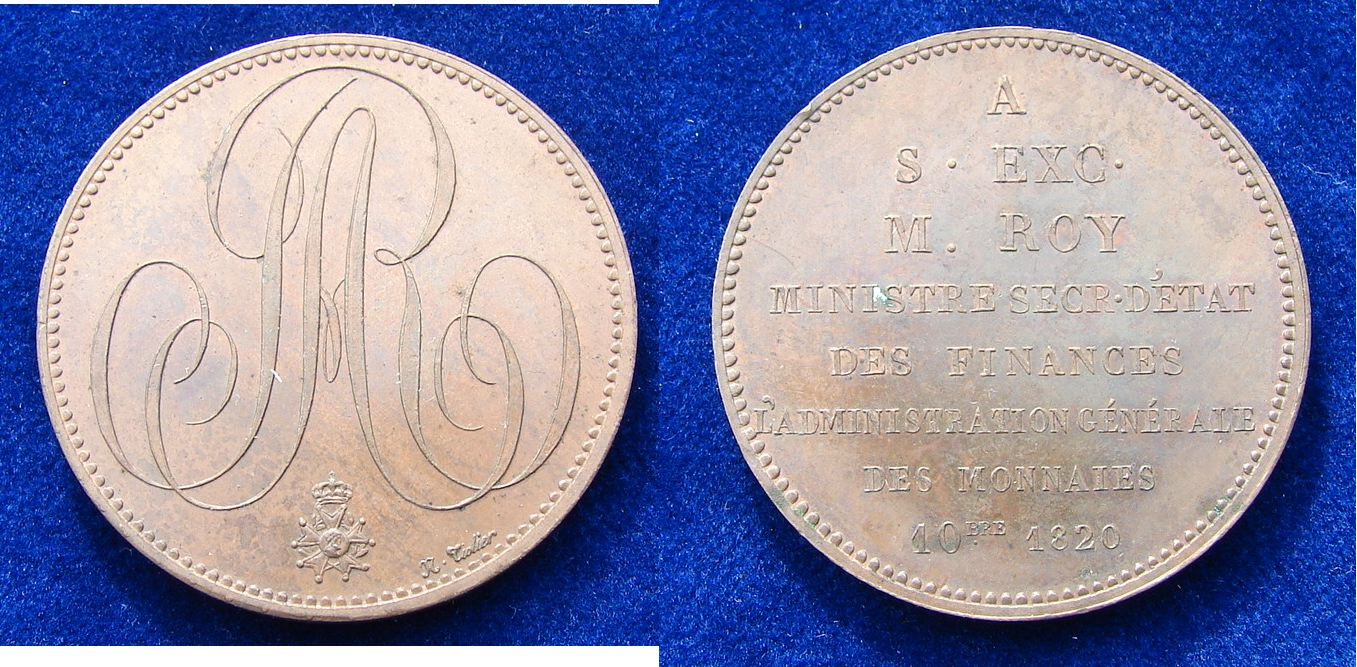
Medal of Antoine Roy, Finance Minister of Louis XVIII

== Sources ==
- Lenormant, François (1891). Appendices Monnaies et médailles. A. Quantin.
- Pinoteau, Hervé (1983). Etat de l'Ordre du Saint-Esprit en 1830; et, La survivance des ordres du roi. Nouvelles Editions Latines. ISBN 978-2-7233-0213-5.
- Pradier, James (1984). Correspondance. Librairie Droz. ISBN 978-2-600-03606-1.
- Rambach, Hadrien J. (July 2013). "Nicolas-Pierre Tiolier". Bulletin Numismatique.
- "TIOLIER Pierre Nicolas (1784-1843)". Association des Amis et Passionnés du Père-Lachaise.
- Webb, Percy (1907). The Reign and Coinage of Carausius. Рипол Классик. ISBN 978-5-88181-419-9.
