= Pierre-Joseph Tiolier =

French engraver (1763–1819)

- Born: 17 March 1763; London, England
- Died: 27 June 1819 (aged 56)
- Occupation: Engraver
- Known for: 15th General Engraver of the mint

Pierre-Joseph Tiolier (17 March 1763 – 27 June 1819) was a French engraver who was appointed the 15th Engraver-General of France.

== Early years ==
Pierre-Joseph Tiolier was born of French parents in London, England on 17 March 1763, the youngest of at least fourteen children. His family originated in Auvergne and included lawyers, businessmen, doctors, clergymen and civil servants. His father, Joseph Tiolier of Cournon, Auvergne was established as a master confectioner in Lons-le-Saunier in 1840. Pierre-Joseph Tiolier was taught by his brother-in-law, Pierre-Simon-Benjamin Duvivier.

== Career ==
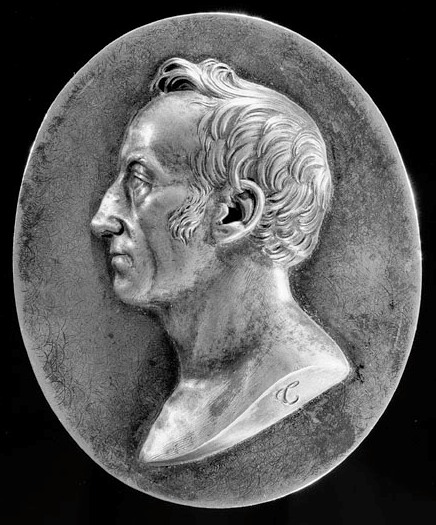
Medallion of James Smithson (1817)

Tiolier was appointed controller of coins at the Paris Mint on 24 Frimaire year IV (14 December 1795). He was named Engraver-General of France by Napoleon, the First Consul, on 11 Germinal year XI (1 April 1803). In 1816 he resigned his position in favor of his son, Nicolas-Pierre Tiolier (1784–1853). In 1817 he was commissioned by the scientist James Smithson to make a bust medallion, which showed Smithson in profile. Pierre-Joseph Tiolier died in 1819.

== Work ==
Coins include:

- 5 Francs Bonaparte First consul (year XI et XII)
- 5 Francs Napoléon Emperor of the French Empire (1809–1815)
- 5 Francs Louis XVIII (1814–1815)
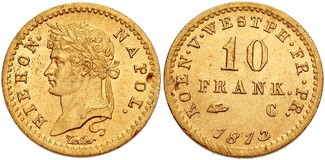
10 Franken 1813 Jérôme Bonaparte, King of Westphalia

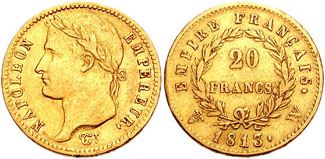
20 Francs, gold, 1813

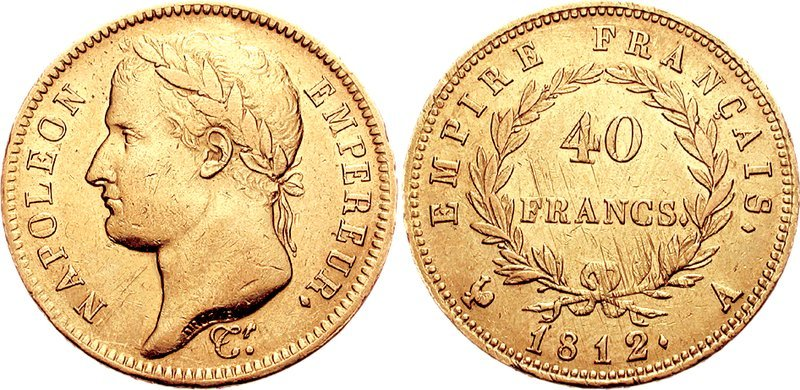
40 Francs, gold, 1812

== Sources ==
- Barre, Albert, Graveur Général des Monnaies (1867). Graveurs Généraux et particuliers des Monnaies de France, Contrôleurs Généraux des Effigies, Noms de quelques graveurs en Médailles de la Renaissance Française. Paris.
- Ewing, Heather (10 December 2008). The Lost World of James Smithson: Science, Revolution, and the Birth of the Smithsonian. Bloomsbury Publishing. ISBN 978-1-59691-779-8.
- Théret, Philippe (2014). "Tiolier Pierre-Joseph". Les amis du Franc. Archived from the original on 13 May 2021.
- Webb, Percy (1907). The Reign and Coinage of Carausius. Рипол Классик. ISBN 978-5-88181-419-9.
