= Romain-Vincent Jeuffroy =

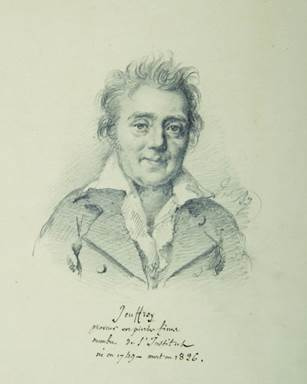
- Portrait by Julien-Léopold Boilly
- Born: 16 July 1749; Rouen, France
- Died: 2 August 1826 (aged 77); Bas-Prunay, near Saint-Germain-en-Laye, France
- Occupation: Engraver

Romain-Vincent Jeuffroy (16 July 1749 – 2 August 1826) was a French gemstone engraver and medalist. He was active before and during the French Revolution and the First French Empire, and made many medals for Napoleon.

== Life ==
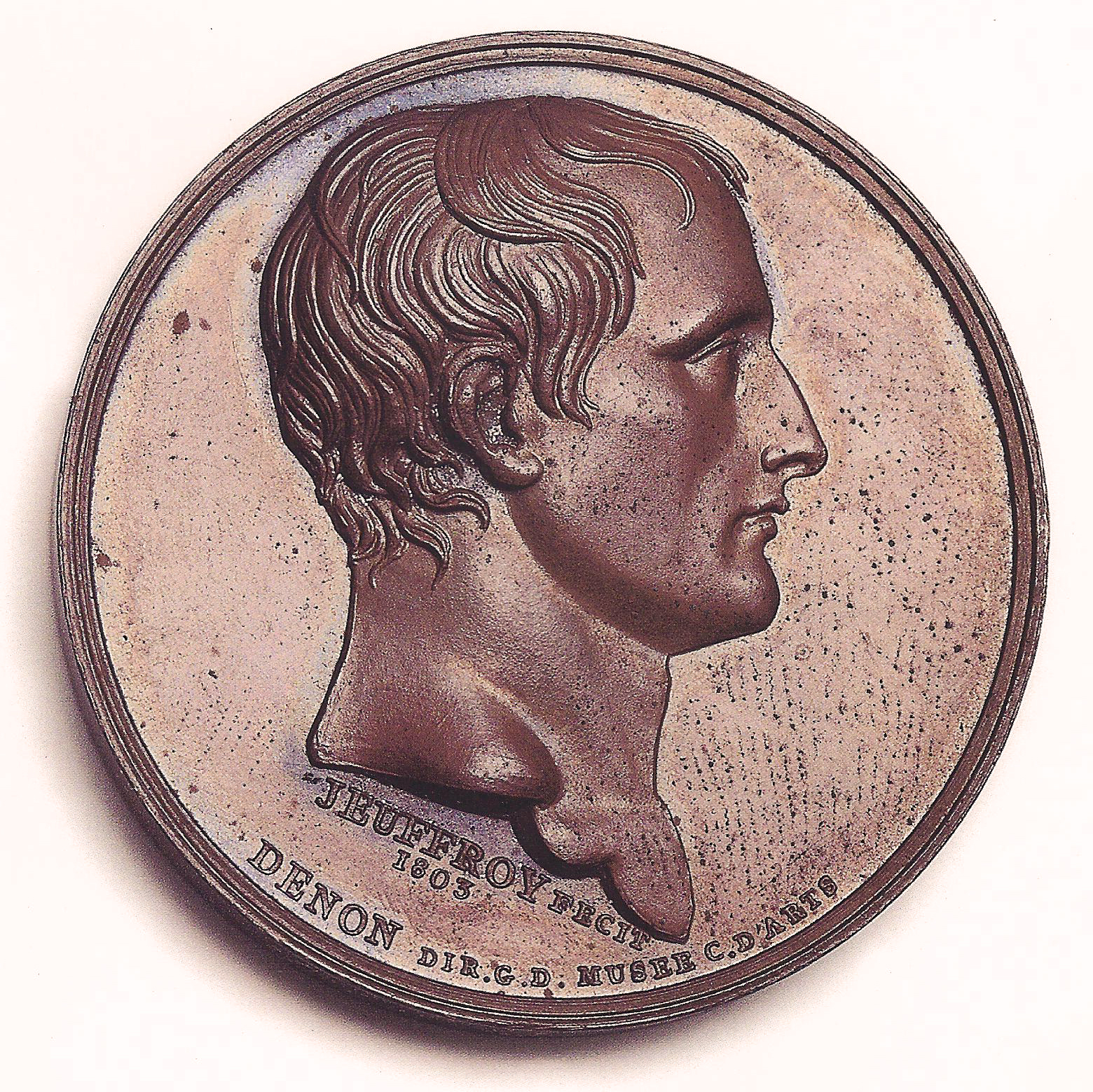
1803 medal of Napoleon

Romain-Vincent Jeuffroy was born on 16 July 1749 in Rouen. He learned his art without a master, imitating an engraved stone that had come into his hands. He made his own tools. He became known, and was sponsored to go to Rome to perfect his art. In 1770 Jeuffroy went to Rome and then to Naples, where he lived for ten years. He worked with Johannes Pichler. He produced many engraved or embossed works, including much work for the French ambassador, the Marquis Jean-Baptiste-Charles-François de Clermont-d'Amboise.

After returning to France he made Paris his home. After Jacques Guay (1715–1787) stopped working, Charles-Claude Flahaut de la Billaderie (1730–1809) tried to revive gemstone engraving. He promised to give the work to Jeuffroy, but did not keep his engagement. Jeuffroy engraved several portraits, which made his reputation. In 1790 he accepted an offer from King Stanislaus II of Poland and moved to Warsaw.

Jeuffroy returned to Paris and was appointed a member of the Institut de France in 1803. He created a commemorative medal for Napoleon entitled "The Treaty of Amiens Broken by England, May 1803". Jeuffroy was made a Knight of the Legion of Honour. In 1805 Napoleon founded a school of gemstone engraving, headed by Jeuffroy. The school was established in the deaf-mute institution. In 1816 Jeuffroy was made a member of the Académie des Beaux-Arts in the engraving section.

Jeuffroy died on 2 August 1826 in Bas-Prunay near Saint-Germain-en-Laye at the age of 77. Pierre-Amédée Dupaty, the medal engraver and sculptor, was one of his pupils. Nicolas-Pierre Tiolier, who became the official engraver of coins, was another pupil.

== Work ==
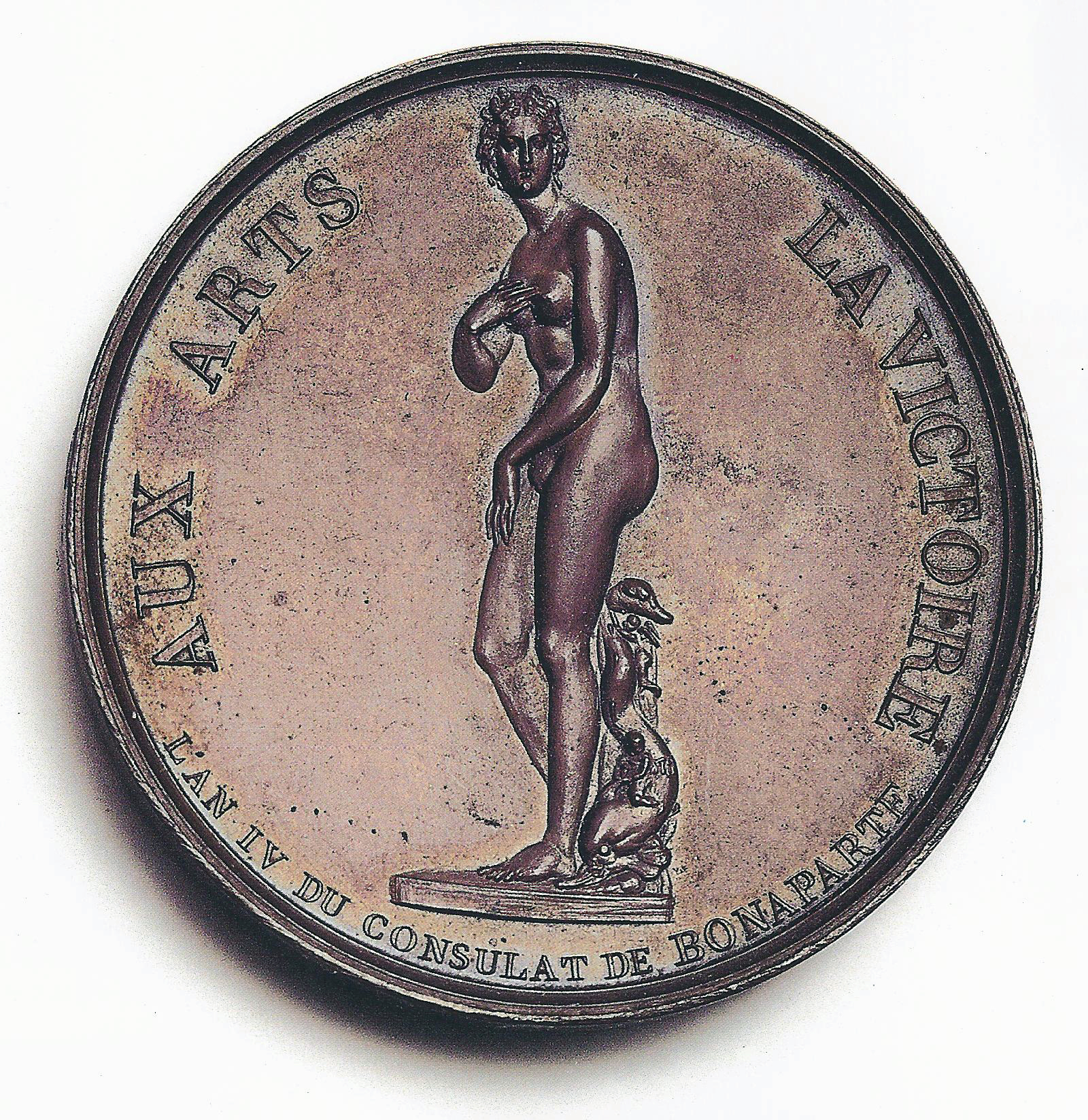
Victory to the Arts. Fourth year of Bonaparte's consulate

Jeuffroy made masterpieces in his genre, particularly the heads of women. His portrait subjects include the King of Poland, Prince Lubomirski and Julie Clary, Queen Consort of Naples.

=== Gemstone engravings ===
- Head of Jupiter
- Louis XVI
- Marie Antoinette
- Military piety
- Love floating on his quiver
- Head of Regulus.
- Angel worshiping
- Medusa
- The genius of Bacchus
- Victor drinking from a cup
- Bacchante

=== Medals ===
- The Dauphin
- Fourcroy
- Madame d'Epremesnil
- Mirabeau
- Dancarville
- Mme. Regnault de Saint-Jean d'Angely
- Mme. Cosway
- The conquest of Hanover
- Peace of Amiens
- Coronation of Napoleon
- Bonaparte armed.
- Capitulation of Spandau and Magdeburg.
- Death of Louis XVII.
- Accession of Louis XVIII, March 20.
- Petrarch.
- Heads of the three consuls.
- Venus de Medici.
- The Temple prison.
- Medal of the Legislature.
- Seal of the Legion of Honor.

== Sources ==
- Bourhis, Katell Le (1989-01-01). The Age of Napoleon: Costume from Revolution to Empire, 1789–1815. Metropolitan Museum of Art. ISBN 978-0-87099-571-2.
- Dussieux, L. (1850). Les Artistes français à l'étranger. Paris: Gide et J. Baudry.
- Hennin, Michel (1826). Histoire numismatique de la Revolution française: ou description raisonnée des médailles, monnaies, et autres monumens numismatiques relatifs aux affaires de la France, depuis l'ouverture des états-généraux jusqu'a l'établissement du gouvernement consulaire. Merlin.
- Hernon, Ian (2013-08-01). Fortress Britain: All the Invasions and Incursions Since 1066. History Press Limited. ISBN 978-0-7524-9717-4.
- Hossard, Nicolas; Delmas, Bruno (2013-12-30). "JEUFFROY Romain, Vincent". Le comité des travaux historiques et scientifiques.
- Pradier, James (1984). Correspondance. Librairie Droz. ISBN 978-2-600-03603-0.
- Schwartz, Emmanuel; Steiner, George; Sénéchal, Philippe (2005). The Legacy of Homer: Four Centuries of Art from the Ecole Nationale Supérieure Des Beaux-Arts, Paris. Dahesh Museum of Art. ISBN 978-0-300-10918-4.
- Tassinari, Gabriella (2013). "Jeoffroy, Romain Vincent". Allgemeines Künstler Lexikon. Vol. 78. Berlin/Boston: De Gruyter.
- Webb, Percy (1907). The Reign and Coinage of Carausius. Рипол Классик. ISBN 978-5-88181-419-9.
