= Olympic medal =

Award given to successful competitors at one of the Olympic Games

Olympic medals
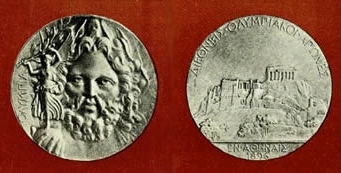
- A silver medal awarded to the winner of an event at the first modern Olympic Games in 1896.
- Awarded for: Given to successful competitors in various Olympic Sports
- Presented by: International Olympic Committee

History
- First award: 1896
- Website: www.olympics.com/en/olympic-games/olympic-medals

An Olympic medal is an honorary medal that is awarded to successful competitors at one of the Olympic Games. There are three classes of medal to be won: gold, silver, and bronze, awarded to first, second, and third place, respectively. The granting of awards is laid out in detail in the Olympic protocols.

Medal designs have varied considerably since the Games in 1896, particularly in the size of the medals for the Summer Olympic Games. The design selected for the 1928 Games remained until its replacement at the 2004 Games in Athens, where the use of the Roman Colosseum was replaced by the Greek Panathenaic Stadium, appropriate to represent Olympic values. In honour of that heritage, the Panathenaic Stadium continues to be featured on the reverse of every Summer Olympics Games medal issued since, overlayed by a rendition of Nike, the ancient Greek goddess of victory. The medals of the Winter Olympic Games, however, never have had a common design, though regularly feature snowflakes and a design representing the event in which the medal was won.

In addition to generally supporting their Olympic athletes, some countries provide sums of money and gifts to medal winners, depending on the classes and number of medals won. In the 2024 Paris Games, 33 countries confirmed that they would award prizes to medallists, with 15 awarding cash prizes over $100,000.

== Introduction and early history ==
The olive wreath was the prize for the winner at the Ancient Olympic Games. It was an olive branch, off the wild-olive tree that grew at Olympia, intertwined to form a circle or a horse-shoe. According to Pausanias, it was introduced by Heracles as a prize for the winner of the running race to honour Zeus.

When the modern Olympic Games began in 1896 medals started to be given to successful olympian competitors. However, gold medals were not awarded at the inaugural Olympics in 1896 in Athens, Greece. The winners were instead given a silver medal and an olive branch, whilst runners-up received a laurel branch and a copper or bronze medal.

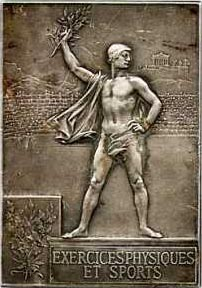
A silver medal from the 1900 Summer Olympics, designed by Frédérique Vernon

The 1900 Summer Olympics is unique in being the only Olympic Games to feature rectangular medals, which were designed by Frédérique Vernon. Gilt silver medals were awarded for 1st place in shooting, lifesaving, automobile racing and gymnastics. Second place silver medals were awarded in shooting, rowing, yachting, tennis, gymnastics, sabre, fencing, equestrian and athletics. Third place bronze medals were awarded in gymnastics, firefighting and shooting. In many sports, however, medals were not awarded, with most of the listed prizes being cups and other trophies.

The custom of the sequence of gold, silver, and bronze for the first three places in all events dates from the 1904 Summer Olympics in St. Louis, Missouri in the United States. The International Olympic Committee (IOC) has retroactively assigned gold, silver and bronze medals to the three best-placed athletes in each event of the 1896 and 1900 Games. If there is a tie for any of the top three places all competitors are entitled to receive the appropriate medal according to IOC rules. Some combat sports (such as boxing, judo, taekwondo and wrestling) award two bronze medals per competition, resulting in, overall, more bronze medals being awarded than the other colours.

Medals are not the only awards given to competitors; every athlete placed first to eighth receives an Olympic diploma. Also, at the main host stadium, the names of all medal winners are written onto a wall. Finally, as noted below, all athletes receive a participation medal and diploma.

== Production and design ==
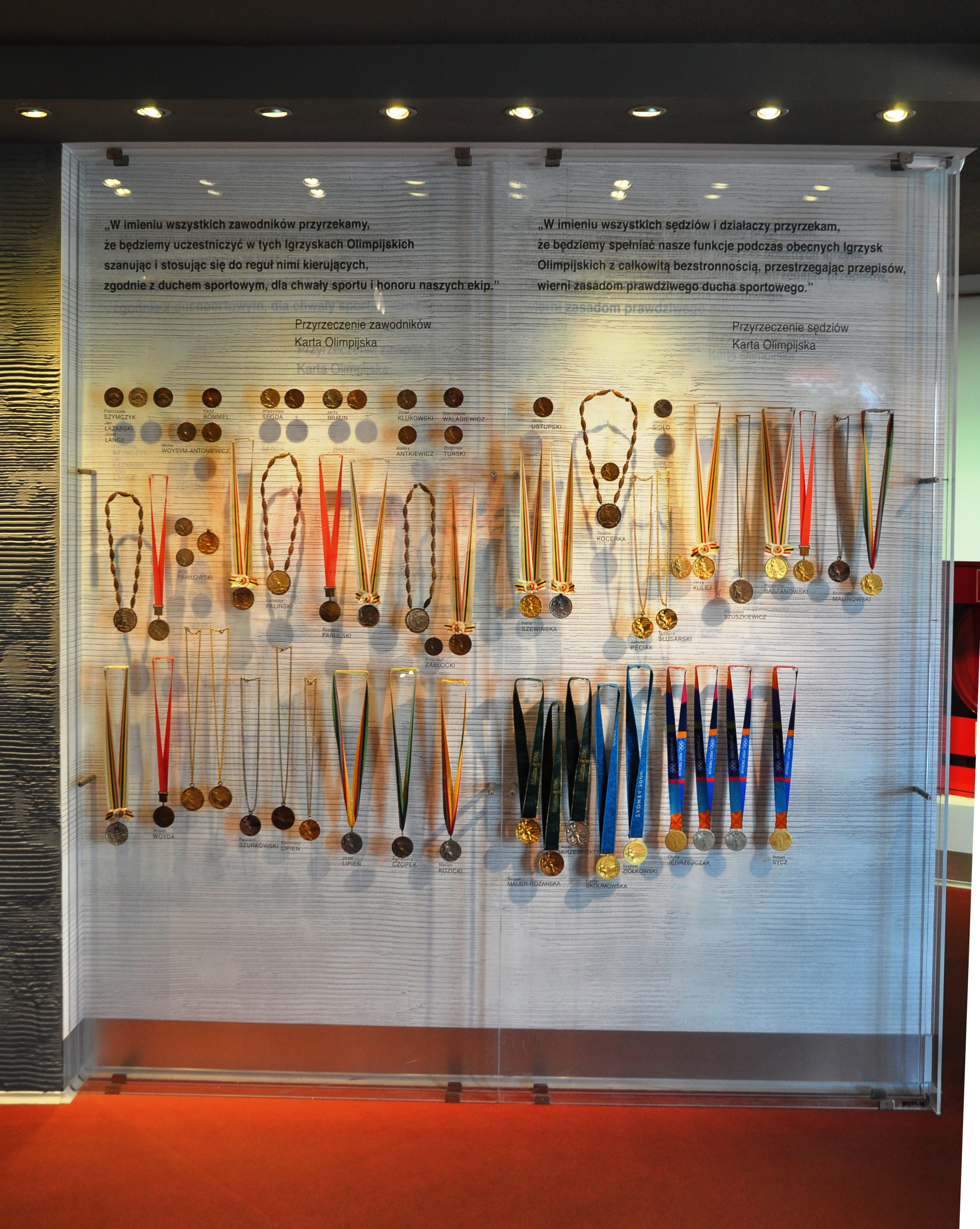
A collection of medals won by Polish athletes, at the Museum of Sport and Tourism in Warsaw

The IOC dictates the physical properties of the medals and has the final decision about the finished design. Specifications for the medals are developed along with the National Olympic Committee (NOC) hosting the Games, though the IOC has brought in some set rules:

- Recipients: The top three competitors receive medals
- Shape: Usually circular, featuring an attachment for a chain or ribbon
- Diameter: A minimum of 60 mm
- Thickness: A minimum of 3 mm
- Material:
  - First place (the gold medal): It is composed at least 92.5% of silver, plated with 6 grams of gold; the metal value was about US$494 in 2010. At the 2020 Summer Olympics held in 2021 in Tokyo, Japan, the medal at then-current prices was worth about $800.
  - Second place (the silver medal): 92.5% silver; the metal value was about US$260 in 2010. At the Tokyo games, the medal was worth $460.
  - Third place (the bronze medal): In 2010 it was 97% copper with 0.5% tin and 2.5% zinc; the metal value was about US$3 in 2010. At the Tokyo games it was 95% copper and 5% zinc with a metal value of about $5.
- Event details: The sport for which the medal has been awarded should be written on the medal.

The first Olympic medals in 1896 were designed by French sculptor Jules-Clément Chaplain and depicted Zeus holding Nike, the Greek goddess of victory, on the obverse and the Acropolis on the reverse. They were made by the Paris Mint, which also made the medals for the 1900 Olympic Games, hosted by Paris. This started the tradition of giving the responsibility of minting the medals to the host city. For the next few Olympiads, the host city also chose the medal design. 1904 to 1912 the gold medals were made of solid gold.

=== Trionfo ===
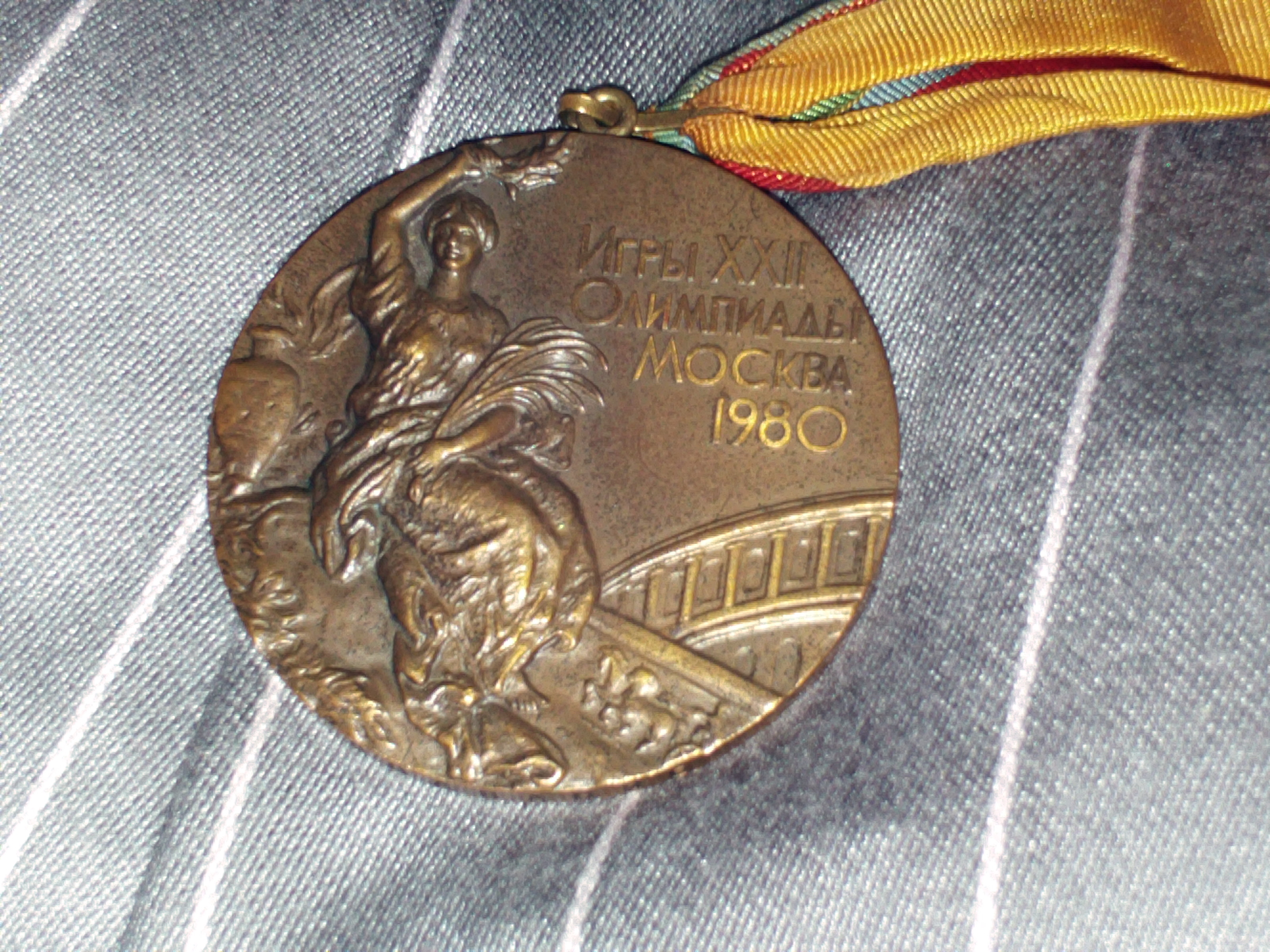
The bronze medal from the 1980 Summer Olympics showing Cassioli's obverse design portraying Nike, the Greek goddess of victory

In 1923 the International Olympic Committee (IOC) launched a competition for sculptors to design the medals for the Summer Olympic Games. Giuseppe Cassioli's Trionfo design was chosen as the winner in 1928. The obverse brought back Nike but this time as the main focus, holding a winner's crown and palm with a depiction of the Colosseum in the background. In the top right section of the medal, a space was left for the name of the Olympic host and the Games numeral.

The reverse features a crowd of people carrying a triumphant athlete. His winning design was first presented at the 1928 Summer Olympics in Amsterdam. The medals for the 1960 Games in Rome inverted the design, with the obverse featuring the crowd and the reverse featuring Nike. The competition saw this design used for 40 years until the 1972 Summer Olympics in Munich became the first Games with a different design for the reverse side of the medal.

Cassioli's design continued to inspire the obverse of the medal for many more years, though recreated each time, with the Olympic host and numeral updated. The obverse remained true to the Trionfo design until the 1992 Summer Olympics in Barcelona, Spain, where the IOC allowed an updated version to be created. For the next few events, they mandated the use of the Nike motif but allowed other aspects to change.

The trend ended after 2000, due to the negative reaction to the medal design for the 2000 Summer Olympics in Sydney. The designer of the 2000 medal (Wojciech Pietranik) had originally featured the Sydney Opera House on the obverse instead of the traditional Roman Colosseum but the International Olympic Committee decided that the Colosseum should remain. The Greek press criticised the design for ignorance of the birthplace of the Olympic Games, pointing out that the long-standing feature on the front of medals was mistakenly depicting the Roman Colosseum rather than the Greek Parthenon. The Sydney Organising Committee decided to continue with the design as it was, noting that there was insufficient time to complete another version and that it would be too costly. After 76 years a new style by designer Elena Votsi depicting the Panathenaic Stadium was introduced at the 2004 Summer Olympics in Athens. This new obverse design remains in use.

=== Custom reverse designs ===
The German Olympic Committee, Nationales Olympisches Komitee für Deutschland, was the first Summer Games organisers to elect to change the reverse of the medal. The 1972 design was created by Gerhard Marcks, an artist from the Bauhaus, and features mythological twins Castor and Pollux. Since then the Organising Committee of the host city has been given the freedom of the design of the reverse, with the IOC giving final approval.

=== Comparison between Summer and Winter ===
The IOC has the final decision on the specifications of each design for all Olympic medals, including the Summer Games, Winter Games, Summer Paralympic Games and Winter Paralympic Games. There has been a greater variety of design applications for the Winter Games; unlike with the Summer Games, the IOC never mandated one particular design. The medal at the inaugural 1924 Winter Olympics in Chamonix, France did not even feature the Olympic rings. Nike was featured on the medals of the 1932 and 1936 Games but has only appeared on one medal design since then. One regular motif is the use of the snowflake, while laurel leaves and crowns appear on several designs. The Olympic motto Citius, Altius, Fortius features on four Winter Games medals but does not appear on any Summer Games medal.

For three events in a row, hosts of the Winter Games included different materials in the medals: glass (1992), sparagmite (1994), and lacquer (1998). It was not until the 2008 Summer Olympics in Beijing, China that a Summer Olympic host chose to use something different, in this case, jade. While every Summer Olympic medal except for the 1900 Games has been circular, the shapes of the Winter Games have been considerably more varied. The designs for the Winter Games medals are also generally larger, thicker, and heavier than those for the Summer Games.

== Individual design details ==
=== Summer Olympic medal designs ===
Details about the medals from each of the Summer Olympic Games:

Games	Host	Details	Designer(s)	Mint	Diameter (mm)	Thickness (mm)	Weight (g)	image
1896	Athens, Greece	Obverse: Zeus holding Nike; Reverse: The Acropolis of Athens	Jules-Clément Chaplain	Paris Mint	48	3.8	47	
1900	Paris, France	Obverse: Winged goddess (possibly Nike) holding laurel branches; Paris in the background Reverse: A victorious athlete holding a laurel branch; the Acropolis in the background Note: The only Summer Olympic medal that is not circular	Frédérique Vernon	Paris Mint	59 x 41	3.2	53	
1904	St. Louis, Missouri, U.S.	Obverse: Nike holding a laurel crown and a palm leaf Reverse: An athlete holding a laurel crown; Greek temple in the background	Dieges & Clust	Dieges & Clust	37.8	3.5	21	
1908	London, Great Britain	Obverse: An athlete receiving a laurel crown from two female figures Reverse: Saint George atop a horse Edge: "Vaughton", event name and winner	Bertram Mackennal	Vaughton & Sons	33	4.4	21	
1912	Stockholm, Sweden	Obverse: An athlete receiving a laurel crown from two female figures Reverse: A herald opening the Games with a statue of Pehr Henrik Ling behind him	Bertram Mackennal (obverse); Erik Lindberg (reverse)	C.C. Sporrong & Co	33.4	1.5	24	
1920	Antwerp, Belgium	Obverse: An athlete holding a laurel crown and a palm leaf Reverse: Statue of Silvius Brabo; Edge: Name, event, team, "Antwerp", and the date	Josuë Dupon	Coosmans	59	4.4	79	
1924	Paris, France	Obverse: An athlete helping another to stand Reverse: A Lyre and various items of sports equipment	André Rivaud	Paris Mint	55	4.8	79	
1928	Amsterdam, Netherlands	Design: Trionfo; Note: This obverse design, sometimes recreated, remains until 2004, the reverse design remained until 1972	Giuseppe Cassioli	Dutch State Mint	55	3	66	
1932	Los Angeles, California, U.S.	Design: Trionfo	Giuseppe Cassioli	Whitehead & Hoag	55.3	5.7	96	
1936	Berlin, Germany	Design: Trionfo	Giuseppe Cassioli	B.H. Mayer	55	5	71	
1948	London, Great Britain	Design: Trionfo	Giuseppe Cassioli	John Pinches	51.4	5.1	60	
1952	Helsinki, Finland	Design: Trionfo; Edge: 916 M / Y6 (Factory Stamp)	Giuseppe Cassioli	Kultakeskus Oy	51	4.8	46.5	
1956	Melbourne, Australia	Design: Trionfo	Giuseppe Cassioli	K.G. Luke	51	4.8	68	
1960	Rome, Italy	Design: Trionfo; Surround: A bronze laurel wreath and laurel leaf chain (The Rome games were the first to place the medal around the athletes neck)	Giuseppe Cassioli	Stabilimenti Artistici Fiorentini	68	6.5	211	
1964	Tokyo, Japan	Design: Trionfo	Giuseppe Cassioli and Toshikaka Koshiba	Japan Mint	60	7.5	62	
1968	Mexico City, Mexico	Design: Trionfo	Giuseppe Cassioli		60	6	130	
1972	Munich, West Germany	Obverse: Trionfo; Reverse: Castor and Pollux, twin sons of Zeus and Leda; Edge: Winner's name and sport	Giuseppe Cassioli (obverse); Gerhard Marcks (reverse)	Bavarian Mint	66	6.5	102	
1976	Montreal, Quebec, Canada	Obverse: Trionfo; Reverse: A stylised laurel crown and the Montreal Games logo Edge: Name of the sport	Giuseppe Cassioli (obverse)	Royal Canadian Mint	60	5.8	154	
1980	Moscow, Russia	Obverse: Trionfo; Reverse: A stylised Olympic flame and the Moscow Games logo	Giuseppe Cassioli (obverse); Ilya Postol (reverse)	Moscow Mint	60	6.8	125	
1984	Los Angeles, California, U.S.	Obverse: Trionfo; Reverse: An Olympic champion held aloft by a crowd Note: The reverse returns to the Cassioli design	Giuseppe Cassioli	Jostens, Inc	60	7.9	141	
1988	Seoul, South Korea	Obverse: Trionfo; Reverse: An outline of a dove carrying a laurel branch and the Seoul Olympic logo	Giuseppe Cassioli (obverse)	Korea Minting and Security Printing Corporation	60	7	152	
1992	Barcelona, Spain	Obverse: Updated interpretation of Trionfo; Reverse: Barcelona Games logo	Xavier Corbero	Royal Mint of Spain	70	9.8	231	
1996	Atlanta, U.S.	Obverse: Updated interpretation of Trionfo; Reverse: A stylised olive branch, the Atlanta Games logo, and "Centennial Olympic Games"; Edge: "Atlanta Committee for the Olympic Games"	Malcolm Grear Designers	Reed & Barton	70	5	181	
2000	Sydney, Australia	Obverse: Updated interpretation of Trionfo; Reverse: The Sydney Opera House, Olympic Flame, and Olympic rings Edge: Event name	Wojciech Pietranik	Royal Australian Mint	68	5	180	
2004	Athens, Greece	Obverse: Nike of Paionios with Panathenaic Stadium and the Acropolis of Athens in the background Reverse: The Olympic Flame, the opening lines of Pindar's Eighth Olympic Ode, and the Athens Games logo	Elena Votsi	Efsimon	60	5	135	
2008	Beijing, China	Obverse: Nike with Panathenaic Stadium and the Acropolis of Athens in the background Reverse: A jade ring with the Beijing Games logo in the centre and the event details on the outer edge	Xiao Yong	China Banknote Printing and Minting Corporation	70	6	200	
2012	London, United Kingdom	Obverse: Nike with Panathenaic Stadium and the Acropolis of Athens in the background Reverse: The River Thames and the London Games logo with angled lines in the background	David Watkins	Royal Mint	85	8–10	357–412	
2016	Rio de Janeiro, Brazil	Obverse: Nike with Panathenaic Stadium and the Acropolis of Athens in the background Reverse: The Rio 2016 logo and name, surrounded by a laurel leaf design in the form of the wreaths Edge: The name of the event for which the medal was won is engraved by laser along the outside edge. Note: For the first time, the medals are slightly thicker at their central point compared with their edges.	Chelles and Hayashi	Casa da Moeda do Brasil	85	6–11	500	
2020	Tokyo, Japan	Obverse: Nike with Panathenaic Stadium and the Acropolis of Athens in the background Reverse: The Tokyo 2020 logo and name, surrounded by rays of sun.	Junichi Kawanishi	Japan Mint	85	7.7–12.1	450–556	
2024	Paris, France	Obverse: Nike with Panathenaic Stadium, the Acropolis of Athens, and the Eiffel Tower in the background, surrounded by rays Reverse: Hexagonal tokens of iron taken from the original construction of the Eiffel Tower engraved with the Paris 2024 logo, surrounded by rays	Chaumet	Monnaie de Paris	85	9.2	455–529	

=== Winter Olympic medal designs ===
Details about the medals from each of the Winter Olympic Games:

Games	Host	Details	Designer(s)	Mint	Diameter (mm)	Thickness (mm)	Weight (g)	Image
1924	Chamonix, France	Obverse: A skier holding skates and skis and the designer's name Reverse: Written information about the Games	Raoul Bénard	Monnaire de Paris	55	4	75	
1928	St. Moritz, Switzerland	Obverse: A skater surrounded by snowflakes Reverse: Olive branches and host details	Arnold Hunerwadel	Huguenin Frères	50.4	3	51	
1932	Lake Placid, U.S.	Obverse: Nike with the Adirondack Mountains in the background Reverse: Laurel leaves and written host details Shape: Circular but not with a straight edge		Robbins Company	55	3	51	
1936	Garmisch-Partenkirchen, Germany	Obverse: Nike atop a horse-drawn chariot traversing an arch over winter sporting equipment Reverse: Large Olympic rings	Richard Klein	Deschler & Sohn	100	4	324	
1948	St. Moritz, Switzerland	Obverse: The Olympic torch with snowflakes in the background and the Olympic motto Citius, Altius, Fortius; Reverse: A snowflake and written host details	Paul Andre Droz	Huguenin Frères	60.2	3.8	103	
1952	Oslo, Norway	Obverse: The Olympic torch and the Olympic motto Citius, Altius, Fortius; Reverse: A pictogram of Oslo City Hall with three snowflakes and written host details	Vasos Falireus and Knut Yvan	Th. Marthinsen	70	3	137.5	
1956	Cortina d'Ampezzo, Italy	Obverse: An "ideal woman" and written host details Reverse: A large snowflake with Pomagagnon in the background, the Olympic motto Citius, Altius, Fortius, and further host details	Costanttino Affer	A.E. Lorioli Fratelli	60.2	3	120.5	
1960	Squaw Valley, U.S.	Obverse: The head of a male and female with host details written around them Reverse: Large Olympic rings, the Olympic motto Citius, Altius, Fortius, and the name of the sport	Herff Jones	Herff Jones Company	55.3	4.3	95	
1964	Innsbruck, Austria	Obverse: Torlauf Mountains, "Innsbruck 1964", and "Torlauf"; Reverse: The Olympic rings above the emblem of Innsbruck with host details around them	Martha Coufal (obverse); Arthur Zegler (reverse)	Münze Österreich	72	4	110	
1968	Grenoble, France	Obverse: Three snowflakes and the red rose emblem of Grenoble surrounded by host details Reverse: A stylised image of each sport	Roger Excoffon	Monnaire de Paris	61	3.3	124	
1972	Sapporo, Japan	Obverse: Pictogram of lines in the snow Reverse: A snowflake, the Sun, and the Olympic rings Shape: Square with rounded, wavy lines	Yagi Kazumi (obverse); Ikko Tanaka (reverse)	Dokuritsu Gyōsei Hōjin Zōheikyoku	57.3 x 61.3	5	130	
1976	Innsbruck, Austria	Obverse: The Olympic rings above the emblem of Innsbruck with host details around them Reverse: The Alps, Bergisel, and the Olympic flame	Martha Coufal (obverse); Arthur Zegler (reverse)	Münze Österreich	70	5.4	164	
1980	Lake Placid, U.S.	Obverse: The Olympic torch held in front of the Adirondack Mountains; Reverse: A pine cone sprig and the Lake Placid logo	Gladys Gunzer	Medallic Art Company	81	6.1	205	
1984	Sarajevo, Yugoslavia	Obverse: Event logo with host details surrounding it Reverse: An athlete's head wearing a laurel crown Shape: Circular but set in a large rounded rectangular shape	Nebojša Mitrić	Zlatara Majdanpek and Zavod za izradu novčanica	71.1 x 65.1	3.1	164	
1988	Calgary, Alberta, Canada	Obverse: Event pictogram with host details surrounding it Reverse: Two people, one wearing a laurel and the other wearing a headdress made up of winter sports equipment	Fridrich Peter	Jostens	69	5	193	
1992	Albertville, France	Obverse: Glass set into the metal, showing the Olympic rings in front of mountains Reverse: Rear side of glass section	René Lalique	René Lalique	92	9.1	169	
1994	Lillehammer, Norway	Sparagmite partially covered in gold, one side showing the Olympic rings and host details, the other depicting the sport in which the medal was won and the Games emblem	Ingjerd Hanevold	Th. Marthinsen	80	8.5	131	
1998	Nagano, Japan	Obverse: Partly lacquered, shows the Games emblem Reverse: Mainly lacquer, containing the Games emblem over the Shinshu mountains	Takeshi Ito	Kiso Kurashi Craft Center	80	8	261	
2002	Salt Lake City, U.S.	Obverse: An athlete carrying the Olympic torch steps out of flames Reverse: Nike holding a victory leaf surrounded by event details Shape: Irregular circle, like the rocks in Utah's rivers	Scott Given, Axiom Design	O.C. Tanner	85	10	567	
2006	Turin, Italy	Obverse: Graphic elements of the Games; Reverse: Pictogram of the specific event Edge: words "XX Olympic Winter Games" in Italian, English, and French; Shape: Circular with a hole representing a piazza	Dario Quatrini	Ottaviani	107	10	469	
2010	Vancouver, British Columbia, Canada	Obverse: An individually cropped section of a large First Nations artwork (orca or raven), making each medal unique Reverse: Emblem of the Games and event details Shape: Circular but with undulations stopping it from being flat	Corrine Hunt and Omer Arbel	Royal Canadian Mint	100	6	500–576	
2014	Sochi, Russian Federation	Obverse: "Patchwork quilt" design representing different regions of Russia; Reverse: Name of the competition in English and the Sochi logo Edge: words "XXII Olympic Winter Games" in Russian, English, and French; Shape: Circular	ADAMAS	ADAMAS	100	10	460, 525, 531	
2018	Pyeongchang County, South Korea	Obverse: Abstract design resembling ripples in a field of snow Reverse: Hangul messages "symbolising the effort of athletes from around the world" Edge: words "Olympic Winter Games Pyeongchang 2018" in Korean (stylized) and English	Lee Suk-woo		92.5	6.91	586, 580, 493	
2022	Beijing, China	Obverse: The same design used in the 2008 Summer Olympics as the Olympic Rings and "XXIV Olympic Winter Games Beijing 2022" surrounded by traditional Chinese art of stars and clouds inside concentric circles Reverse: The same design used in the 2008 Summer Olympics, a stylized depiction of the Solar System around the logo, marking the Games coinciding with Chinese New Year festivities	Hang Hai		87		550	
2026	Milan and Cortina d'Ampezzo, Italy	Obverse: Diagonally split surface, upper left slightly grainy, lower right smooth polished, at the center the five Olympic rings in polished relief. Reverse: Diagonally split surface, upper right slightly grainy with the five Olympic rings and the Milano Cortina logo in polished relief, lower left smooth polished with engraved name of the discipline and specialty. Along the outer polished edge, the name of the games, engraved.	Istituto Poligrafico e Zecca dello Stato	Istituto Poligrafico e Zecca dello Stato	80	10	506, 500, 420	

== Participation medals ==
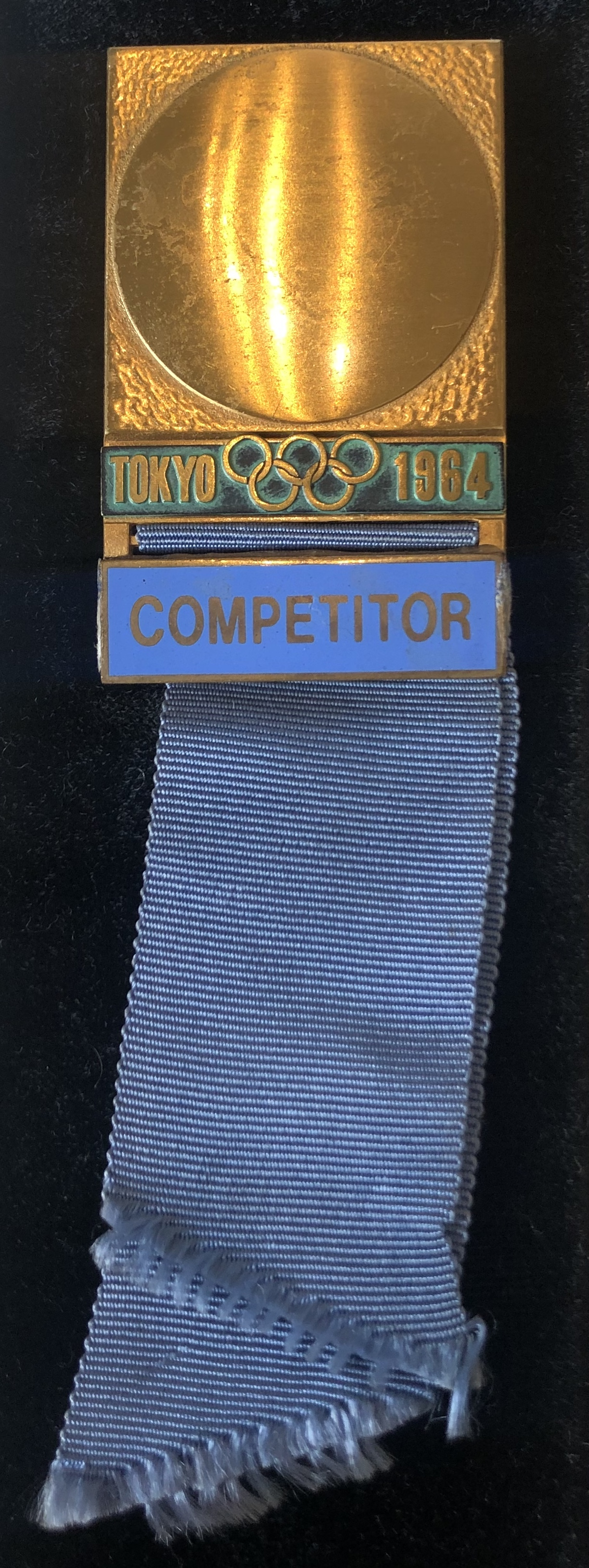
1964 Summer Olympic Games competitor medal awarded to Irish yachtsman Eddie Kelliher

Since the beginning of the modern Olympics the athletes and their support staffs, event officials, and certain volunteers involved in planning and managing the games have received commemorative medals and diplomas. Like the winners' medals, these are changed for each Olympic Festival, with different ones issued for the summer and winter games.

== Gallery ==
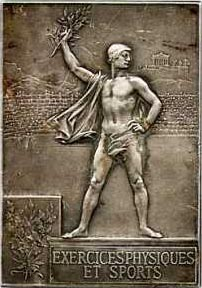
Reverse of the plaque from the 1900 Olympic Games in France

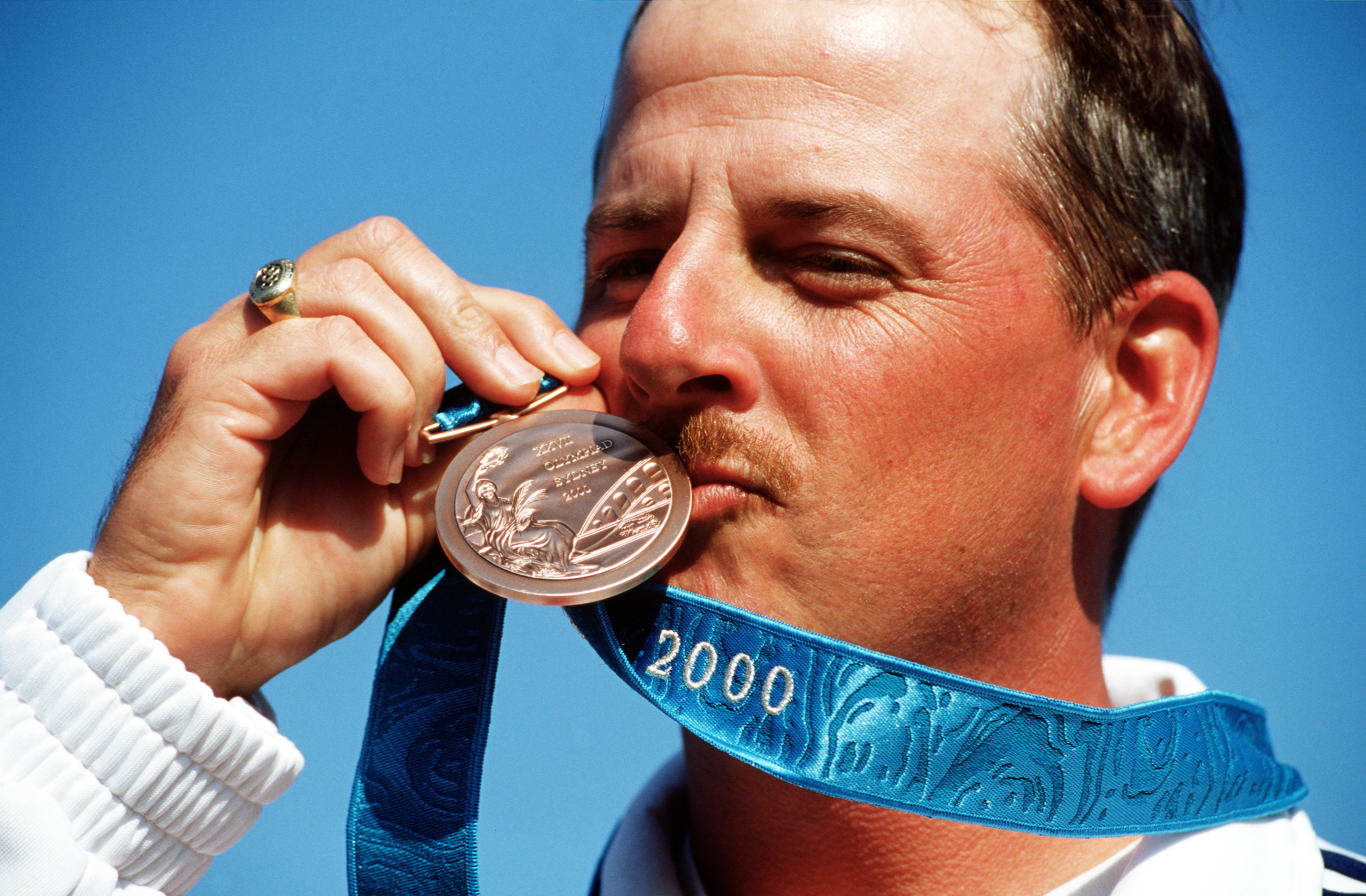
James Graves wearing a bronze medal at the 2000 Summer Olympics, the last version of the Trionfo design

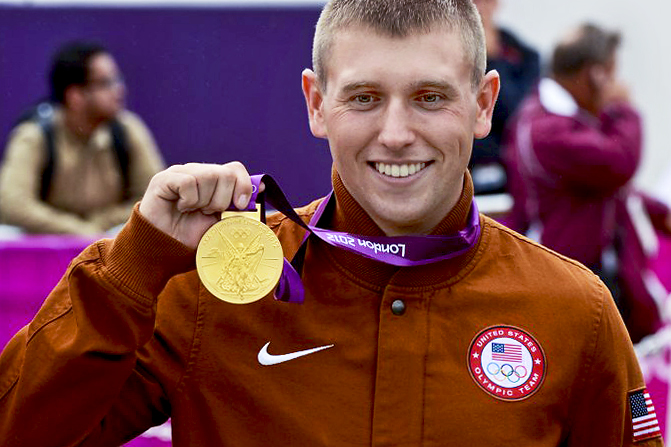
Vincent Hancock with his gold medal at the 2012 Summer Olympics, the heaviest Summer Olympics medal prior to the 2016 Rio Olympics

== Presentation ==
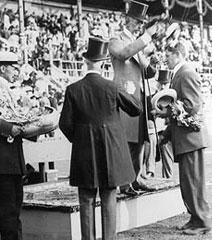
Jim Thorpe receives his medal at the 1912 Summer Olympics

The presentation of the medals and awards varied significantly until the 1932 Summer Olympics in Los Angeles brought in what has now become standard. Before 1932 all the medals were awarded at the closing ceremony, with the athletes wearing evening dress for the first few Games. Originally the presenting dignitary was stationary while the athletes filed past to receive their medals. The victory podium was introduced upon the personal instruction in 1931 of Henri de Baillet-Latour, who had seen one used at the 1930 British Empire Games. The winner is in the middle at a higher elevation, with the silver medallist to their right and the bronze to their left. At the 1932 Winter Olympics, medals were awarded in the closing ceremony, with athletes for each event in turn mounting the first-ever podium. At the 1960 Summer Olympics, competitors in the Stadio Olimpico received their medals immediately after each event for the first time; competitors at other venues came to the Stadio Olimpico the next day to receive their medals. Later Games have had a victory podium at each competition venue.

The 1960 Summer Olympics in Rome, Italy were the first in which the medals were placed around the neck of the athletes. The medals hung from a chain of laurel leaves, while they are now hung from a coloured ribbon. When Athens hosted the 2004 Summer Olympics the competitors on the podium also received an olive wreath crown. In the 2016 Summer Olympics in Rio de Janeiro, each medalist received a wooden statuette of the Olympic logo.

It is customary for many medals at the Winter Olympics to be presented in a separate ceremony on the evening of or the evening after competition. At the 2002 Winter Olympics in Salt Lake City, the "medals plaza" was popularized as a way for the public to see presentations that would have otherwise taken place at far-flung, low-capacity or high-altitude venues and to have an evening program that often included musical performances.

== See also ==
- Lists of Olympic medalists
- Olympic Cup
- Olympic diploma
- Olympic Diploma of Merit
- Olympic Laurel
- Olympic Order
- Summer Olympic coins
- Winter Olympic coins
- James Brendan Connolly, recipient of the first winner's medal
- Pierre de Coubertin Medal, a special medal awarded by the International Olympic Committee for sportsmanship or exceptional service to the Olympic movement
