= Commemorative coins of Australia =

The Royal Australian Mint has issued Australian commemorative coins since 1927 with a range of designs, often depicting various anniversaries, organisations, and significant events in Australian history. Commemorative coins have been issued for various denominations from both the Australian pound and decimal currencies.

== 2 dollar coin ==
Australia's first commemorative $2 coin was released in 2012 to commemorate Remembrance Day. It features a poppy in the centre on a background of microtext, reading: "REMEMBRANCE DAY" and "LEST WE FORGET". Australia is the second country to circulate coloured commemorative coins, after Canada.

Year issued	Commemorative subject	Total in set	Reverse designer	Reverse design	Mintage figures
2012	Remembrance Day – Red Poppy	1	Aaron Baggio	Coloured red poppy centre on microtext background.	503,000
2012	Remembrance Day – Gold Poppy	1	Aaron Baggio	Non-coloured poppy centre on microtext background.	5,799,000
2013	60th Anniversary of Queen Elizabeth II's Coronation	1	Aleksandra Stokic	Concentric purple stripes and a central design feature of St Edward's Crown.	995,000
2014	Remembrance Day – Green Peace Dove	1	Unknown	Designed to commemorate Remembrance Day with a dove and olive branch surrounded by concentric green circles and rays of sunlight. Inspired by the Rising Sun badge.	1,856,000
2015	Lest We Forget - War Graves ANZAC Cove	1	Aleksandra Stokic	Designed to commemorate 100 years since the ANZAC Cove landing. Poppies and graves surround a red concentric circle encapsulating the words "Lest We Forget".	1,466,000
2015	Remembrance Day -In Flanders Fields	1	Aleksandra Stokic	Designed to commemorate the poem In Flanders Fields. Sculpted larks surrounding the orange coloured rings representing the sunset glow.	2,151,000
2016	50th Anniversary of Decimal Currency	1	George Kruger Gray	2016 obverse design to celebrate the 50th anniversary of Australian decimal currency.	2,975,000
2016	Rio de Janeiro Olympic Games (Australian Team)	6	Bronwyn King	Released in partnership with Woolworths. 6 total coins: 5 coins had a blue, black, red, yellow or green ring. A multicoloured Paralympics coin was also minted as part of the set.	1,600,000 of each
2017	Lest We Forget - Australian War Memorial Dome	1	Tony Dean	Depiction of Napier Waller's mosaic from the Australian War Memorial's Hall of Memory.	2,900,000
2017	Remembrance Day – Rosemary Wreath	1	Aleksandra Stokic	Designed to commemorate Remembrance Day. Inner circle containing rosemary, surrounded by circle of pad printed rosemary leaves and flowers in green and purple. The word "Remembrance" is intertwined through the rosemary leaves.	2,122,000
2017	Possum Magic	3	Julie Vivas	Released in partnership with Woolworths. Three coins were released: Invisible Hush, 'Hush sees her tail' and 'Hush visible again'.	1,750,000 of each
2018	Lest We Forget - Eternal Flame	1	Bronwyn King	Depiction of the eternal flame from the Australian War Memorial.	3,400,000
2018	Remembrance Day - Armistice Centenary	1	Tony Dean	Designed to commemorate the 100th anniversary of the Armistice of 11 November 1918. Depicts the number 100 with a poppy in the middle zero.	1,658,000
2018	Invictus Games in Sydney	1	Aleksandra Stokic	Commemorating the 2018 Invictus Games, hosted in Sydney, Australia. Depicts the side view of an athlete in a wheelchair.	2,100,000
2018	XXI Commonwealth Games in Gold Coast	3	Unknown	Released in partnership with Woolworths. 3 Coins: Games Emblem, Australian Team, Mascot Borobi	1,550,000 of each
2019	Lest We Forget - Centenary of Repatriation	1	Adam Ball	Old style Australian Defence Force badge surrounded by poppy petals. The words "ONE HUNDRED YEARS OF REPATRIATION" surround the design.	2,000,000
2019	Remembrance Day - Police Remembrance	1	Adam Ball	Standardised seven-pointed star police badge with inner circle depicting a crown surrounded by ring of blue and white checkered tape.	2,000,000
2019	Wallabies Rugby Team	1	Aaron Baggio	Released in partnership with Woolworths. Colourised green and gold ring surrounding a wallaby holding a ball with "Wallabies Australia" on the outside. Part of the "Sporting Events".	1,830,000
2019	60th Anniversary of Mr Squiggle	4	Tony Dean	Released in partnership with Woolworths. Four coins: 'Mr Squiggle', 'Bill the Steam Shovel', 'Gus the Snail' and 'Blackboard'.	1,635,000 of each
2020	Lest We Forget - 75th Anniversary of the End of WW II	1	Tony Dean	Designed to commemorate the 75th anniversary of the End of World War II. A tri-coloured circle of green, blue and white representing the three armed forces involved in WWII is superimposed over a peace dove flying over a part of the globe with Australia visible on the bottom.	600,000
2020	Remembrance Day -Firefighters	1	Aleksandra Stokic	Depicts a male and female firefighter standing back to back fighting a fire. An orange coloured ball of flame is superimposed in the centre. The word "FIREFIGHTERS" is placed at the bottom.	1,600,000
2020	2020 Tokyo Olympic Games (Australian Team)	6	Unknown	Released in partnership with Woolworths. 6 total coins: 5 coins had a blue, black, red, yellow or green ring. A multicoloured Paralympics coin was also minted as part of the set.	1,600,000 of each
2020	ICC Women's T20 World Cup	1	Unknown	Released in partnership with Woolworths. Designed to commemorate the hosting of 2020 ICC Women's T20 World Cup in Australia. Depicts a female cricketer in front of stumps, surrounded by a coloured circle.	1,700,000
2021	Lest We Forget -Indigenous Military Service	1	Chern’ee Sutton	The inner circle features a black handprint and is surrounded by three rows of dots in the colours of the Defense Forces Tri-Service Flag. The outer circle contains various Aboriginal objects such as spears.	2,000,000
2021	Remembrance Day - Ambulance Service	1	Aaron Baggio	The coin honours the 33,000 paramedics who worked in the various ambulance services during the COVID-19 pandemic in Australia. Depicts a male and female paramedic attending a patient on a stretcher. A green ring in the middle contains the Maltese cross.	2,000,000
2021	30th Anniversary of the Wiggles	4	Unknown	Released in partnership with Woolworths. Four coins: 'Captain Feathersword', 'Wags the Dog', 'Henry the Octopus' and 'Dorothy the Dinosaur'.	1,500,000 of each
2021	50th Anniversary of the Aboriginal Flag	1	Harold Thomas	Designed to commemorate the 50th anniversary of the Australian Aboriginal flag.	2,000,000
2022	Remembrance Day - 75th Anniversary of Peacekeeping	1	Aleksandra Stokic	Two doves encircle a blue United Nations coloured centre whilst bearing olive branches in their mouths.	2,000,000
2022	Australian Frontline Workers	1	Adam William Ball	Designed to honour frontline workers who worked during the COVID-19 pandemic in Australia. A ring of 12 pictograms of frontline workers are depicted on the coin.	2,000,000
2022	Honey Bee	1	Aleksandra Stokic	Two honey bees sit on a sphere with honeycomb shapes on the surface, surrounded by flowers and branches from a wattle tree.	2,000,000
2022	XXII Birmingham Commonwealth Games (Australian Team)	3	Unknown	Released in partnership with Woolworths. Three coins: Letter A, Letter U and Letter S, all in the centre with a multicoloured ring around each letter.	2,000,000 of each
2022	Socceroos Centenary	1	Unknown	Released in partnership with Woolworths. Coloured coin to celebrate the centenary of the Australian Men’s National Football Team.	1,500,000
2023	Centenary of Vegemite	3	Aaron Baggio	Released in partnership with Woolworths. Three coins: "100 Mitey Years" with a yellow ring, "Tastes Like Australia" with a black ring, and "Happy Little Vegemites" with a red ring.	1,000,000 of each
2023	Matildas	3	Unknown	Released in partnership with Woolworths. Three coins: "Bold" features a dark green ring around a soccer ball, "Fierce" features a light green ring around a soccer ball, "United" features a yellow ring around a soccer ball.	1,000,000 of each
2024	Remembrance Day - War Animals	1	Bronwyn Scott	Commemerates animals that fought and died in war. Features a dog and horse circling a purple poppy flower.	2,089,721
2024	NRL/NRLW	2	Lydia Ashe	Released in partnership with Anaconda. Two coins featuring NRL Trophies. The Women's Trophy features a teal blue coloured ring, the Men's Trophy features a light green ring.	1,000,000 of each
2024	Paris Olympic Games (Australian Team)	4	Multiple	Released in partnership with Woolworths. Four coins: ‘COMMUNITY’ (AOC logo), ‘OLYMPISM’ (boxing kangaroo) and ‘ALLEZAUS' (breakdancing kangaroo). A paralympic coin was also minted.	1,500,000 of each
2025	Remembrance Day - 80th Anniversary of the End of WWII	1	Aleksandra Stokic	Features 8 red poppies symbolizing eight decades of peace, commemorating the 80th Anniversary of the End of WWII.	2,001,472
2025	30th Anniversary of the Torres Strait Islander Flag	1	Elyssa Waterford & Lavinia Ketchell	The flag, designed by Bernard Namok in 1992, celebrates Torres Strait Islanders’ cultural heritage, resilience and connection to their land and sea.	2,087,802
2025	Hickory Dickory Watch	1	Lydia Ashe	Released in partnership with NewsXpress. For 45 years, the Australian Women’s Weekly Children’s Birthday Cake Book has been at the heart of childhood celebrations across the country. The coloured coin features the Hickory Dickory Watch design.	1,000,000
2025	Rugby Australia	2	Adam Ball	Released in partnership with Rebel. Two coins: Wallabies and Wallaroos.	100,000 of each
2025	Australian Open	2	Aaron Baggio	Released in partnership with Australia Post. Two coins: The Men's coin features a male tennis player and dark blue tennis ball, and the Women's coin features a female tennis player and light blue tennis ball.	750,000 of each
2026	Lest We Forget - Dawn Service	1	Bronwyn Scott	Commemorating the Dawn Service observed around Australia on the 25th of April - ANZAC Day to honour veterans and fallen service members.	1,786,945
2026	Remembrance Day - The Last Post	1	Lydia Ashe	Commemorates the Last Post played on Remembrance Day. Features a soldier playing the last post with musical notes. A orange/purple spot is in the centre.	TBA
2026	Matildas	1	Unknown	Celebrating Australia’s national women’s football team.	TBA
2026	Bluey	2	Ludo Studios	Released in partnership with Australia Post. Two coins: Bluey - For Real Life, Bingo - Hooray.	1,250,000 of each
2026	XXIII Glasgow Commonwealth Games (Australian Team)	3	Adam Ball	Released in partnership with Woolworths. Three coins: Athletics Competitor, Artistic Gymnast & 3x3 Wheelchair Basketballer.	1,000,000 of each

== 1 dollar coin ==
Not all years have issues for circulation with 1987, 1989, 1990, 1991, 1992 and 2012 only in mint packs. Issue 1984, 1985, 1994, 1995, 1998, 2000, 2004, 2005, 2006 and 2008 are the only issue with the Kangaroo portrait, however, the 2007 $1 with the kangaroo was also minted, but only for mint sets.

Year issued	Commemorative subject	Reverse designer	Reverse design	Mintage figures
1986	International Year of Peace	Horst Hahne	Hands holding a dove	25,200,000
1988	Australian Bicentenary	Stuart Devlin	Aboriginal design of a Koori Kangaroo	21,600,000
1993	Landcare Australia	Vladimir Gottwald	Wavy lines and hands shaping Australia	18,200,000
1996	Sir Henry Parkes Centenary	Wojciech Pietranik	Portrait of Sir Henry Parkes (1815–1896), "Father of Federation"	26,200,000
1997	Sir Charles Kingsford Smith Centenary	Wojciech Pietranik	Portrait of Sir Charles Kingsford Smith (1897–1935) and plane	24,381,000
1999	International Year of Older Persons	Wojciech Pietranik	International Year of Older Persons logo "towards a society for all ages"	29,218,000
2001	Centenary of Federation	Wojciech Pietranik	Centenary of Federation logo	27,905,390
2001	International Year of the Volunteers	Wojciech Pietranik	International Year of Volunteers logo	6,074,000
2002	Year of the Outback	Wojciech Pietranik	Year of Outback logo	34,074,000
2003	Australia's Volunteers	Wojciech Pietranik	Stylised spiral roll symbolising the shape of the outline of Australia	4,149,000
2003	Centenary of Women's Suffrage	Vladimir Gottwald	Representation of the female figures in the suffrage banner by Dora Meeson Coates	10,007,000
2005	60th Anniversary of the end of World War II	Wojciech Pietranik	The Dancing Man	10,607,000
2007	APEC Australia 2007	Wojciech Pietranik	Logo/Symbol of the Asia-Pacific Economic Cooperation (APEC) forum made up of a 7 pointed star itself made from 21 boomerangs	20,108,000
2008	Centenary of Scouts Australia	Caitlin Goodall	Depiction of the Australian spirit flame, the Australian Scout symbol which resembles the international Scouting symbol, the fleur-de-lis, incorporating the southern cross	17,157,000
2009	Centenary of Commonwealth Age Pension	Wojciech Pietranik	Six adults and five children depicted representing pensioners or people dependent on age pensions	10,168,000
2010	Centenary of Girl Guides Australia	Wojciech Pietranik	Depiction of the Australian Girl Guides Symbol which is the Girl Guides Trefoil with a 7 pointed Star in the top leaf of the Trefoil	12,585,000
2011	Commonwealth Heads of Government Meeting	Tim Leaversuch	Commonwealth Heads of Government Meeting 2011, Perth, Western Australia	9,397,000
2014	ANZAC Centenary		Logo of the ANZAC centenary. Australian soldier with head bowed and rifle reversed in solemn reflection	21,830,000
2015	ANZAC Centenary		Logo of the ANZAC centenary. Australian soldier with head bowed and rifle reversed in solemn reflection	1,400,000
2016	ANZAC Centenary		Logo of the ANZAC centenary. Australian soldier with head bowed and rifle reversed in solemn reflection	2,198,000
2016	50th anniversary of Decimal Currency	Stuart Devlin	2016 obverse design to celebrate the 50th anniversary of decimal currency	560,000
2017	ANZAC Centenary		Logo of the ANZAC centenary. Australian soldier with head bowed and rifle reversed in solemn reflection	1,899,000
2018	ANZAC Centenary		Logo of the ANZAC centenary. Australian soldier with head bowed and rifle reversed in solemn reflection	2,000,000
2019	Australia's Dollar Discovery	Stuart Devlin	3 coins featuring the standard Five Kangaroos design with a '35' privy mark. Each of the 3 district coins feature either an 'A', 'U' or 'S' privy mark.	Letter A) 1,513,000 Letters U & S) 1,512,000
2019	Great Aussie Coin Hunt 1		A–Z (alphabet) coins issued featuring 'Iconic Australia'. A total of 26 coins issued.	523,000 of each
2020	Centenary of Qantas		Logo of Centenary of Qantas	2,000,000
2020	Donation Dollar		A dollar designed to be donated	12,500,000
2021	Great Aussie Coin Hunt 2		A–Z (alphabet) coins issued featuring 'Iconic Australia'. A total of 26 coins issued.	456,000 of each
2021	Donation Dollar		A dollar designed to be donated	12,900,000
2022	Australian Dinosaurs		Four uncirculated coins featuring Australian Dinosaurs. Australovenator, Diamantinasaurus, Elaphrosaurine and Kunbarrasaurus.	600,000 of each
2022	Great Aussie Coin Hunt 3		A–Z (alphabet) coins issued featuring 'Iconic Australia'. A total of 26 coins issued.	498,999 of each
2023	Aussie Big Things 1		10 coins featuring some of Australia's "Big Things". Giant Murray Cod, The Big Pineapple, The Big Banana, Big Blue Heeler, Giant Koala, The Big Swoop, The Big Jumping Croc, The Big Lobster, The Tasmanian Devil and Giant Ram.	320,000 of each
2023	Australian Football League premiership coin hunt		18 coins released featuring eighteen team badges and two featuring the AFL & AFLW winning cups	Various mintages
2023	Australian Football League premiership coin hunt		Two coins featuring the AFL & AFLW winning cups with coloured reverses.	1,661,000 of each
2023	Matildas		Four coins celebrating the Australian Women's National Football Team. 'Header', 'Keeper', 'Striker' & 'Tackle'.	1,000,000 of each
2024	Australian Football League premiership		Two coins featuring the AFL & AFLW Best & Fairest Medals.	1,390,000 of each
2024	Bluey		Two coins. 1 featuring 'Bluey' and 1 featuring 'Bingo' from the Bluey Animated TV series.	1,250,000 of each
2025	Aussie Big Things - two		Two Coins; Each features 5 Aussie Big Things	TBA
2026	Mob of Six Roos	Stuart Devlin*	Celebrating 60 years of decimal currency. The new design, called the ‘Mob of Six Roos’, adds a sixth kangaroo to the original composition created by master designer Stuart Devlin, marking each decade since the introduction of dollars and cents in 1966.	TBA

== 50 cent coin ==
Year issued	Commemorative subject	Reverse designer	Reverse design	Mintage figures
1970	Bicentenary of the exploration of the eastern coast of Australia by James Cook	Stuart Devlin	Portrait of Captain Cook with Australian map	16,548,000
1977	Silver Jubilee of Elizabeth II, Queen of Australia	Stuart Devlin	Silver Jubilee design	25,067,000
1981	Wedding of Charles, Prince of Wales, and Lady Diana Spencer	Stuart Devlin	Portraits of Prince & Princess of Wales	20,000,000
1982	XII 1982 Commonwealth Games held in Brisbane	Stuart Devlin	Commonwealth Games Theme	49,610,200
1988	First Fleet Bicentenary 1788-1988	Michael Tracey	Ship	8,999,000
1991	25th Anniversary of Decimal Currency	George Kruger Gray & Horst Hahne	Merino ram's head	4,704,000
1994	International Year of the Family	Carolyn Rosser	Family	19,580,000
1995	50th Anniversary of the end of World War II	Louis Laumen & Horst Hahne	Sir Edward 'Weary' Dunlop	15,869,200
1998	Commemorating 200 years since the discovery of The Bass Strait in 1798 by Matthew Flinders who named the Strait after his colleague George Bass	Vladimir Gottwald	Portrait of Bass & Flinders	22,389,200
2000	Millennium Year 2000	Vladimir Gottwald	Stylised Australian flag	16,630,000
2000	Royal visit, also featuring a commemorative portrait of the Queen on the obverse.	Vladimir Gottwald	Flag pole at Parliament House	5,145,000
2001	Centenary of Federation – Australia			43,149,600
2001	Centenary of Federation – States & Territories – New South Wales	William Applegate Gullick.	New South Wales Coat of Arms	3,042,000
2001	Centenary of Federation – States & Territories – Australian Capital Territory			2,000,000
2001	Centenary of Federation – States & Territories – Queensland			2,320,000
2001	Centenary of Federation – States & Territories – Victoria			2,800,000
2001	Centenary of Federation – States & Territories – Northern Territory			2,080,000
2001	Centenary of Federation – States & Territories – Western Australia			2,400,000
2001	Centenary of Federation – States & Territories – South Australia			2,400,000
2001	Centenary of Federation – States & Territories – Tasmania			2,160,000
2001	Centenary of Federation – States & Territories – Norfolk Island			2,000,000
2002	Year of the Outback	Wojciech Pietranik		11,507,000
2003	Australia's Volunteers	Vladimir Gottwald		13,927,000
2004	Student Design	Vladimir Gottwald & Student John Serrano, St Peter's Primary School, East Keilor	Animals: Wombat, Koala and Lorikeet	10,577,000
2005	Remembrance: 60th Anniversary of the end of World War II	Wojciech Pietranik	Soldier silhouettes by a grave	21,033,000
2005	Student Design – XVIII 2006 Commonwealth Games Melbourne			20,719,000
2010	Commemorating Australia Day 2010	Vladimir Gottwald		11,452,000
2014	50th Anniversary of the Australian Institute of Aboriginal and Torres Strait Islander Studies – AIATSIS		AIATSIS logo, based on a shield created by the Uw Oykangand people of North Queensland.	3,003,000
2016	50th Anniversary of Decimal Currency		2016 obverse design to celebrate the 50th anniversary of decimal currency	7,036,000
2017	25 Years – Mabo Decision & 50 Years – 1967 Referendum		Depiction of Eddie Mabo and Referendum How to Vote card from 1967	1,409,000
2019	International Year of Indigenous Languages		Features the words "International Year of Indigenous Languages" amidst 14 indigenous words that mean "money"	2,000,000
2024	50th Anniversary of NAIDOC	Cortney Glass, Winner of the National NAIDOC Committee's design competition.	50th Anniversary of the National Aboriginal and Islanders Day Observance Committee. Features a '50' with the Australian Aboriginal Flag over the '5' and the Torres Strait Islander Flag over the '0'.	3,352,000
2026	Unity: Courage & Land Rights in Australian History		Commemorates the 60th anniversary of the Wave Hill walk-off and 50th anniversary of Aboriginal land rights.	TBA

== 20 cent coin ==
Year issued	Commemorative subject	Reverse designer	Reverse design	Mintage figures
1995	50th Anniversary of the United Nations	Horst Hahne	UN emblem	4,835,000
2001	Tribute to Sir Donald Bradman	Vladimir Gottwald	Donald Bradman in cricket gear, circular lettering	10,000,000
2001	Centenary of Federation – New South Wales	Student Joseph Neve from the Bellingen High School	NSW emblem	3,042,000
2001	Centenary of Federation – Australian Capital Territory	Student Stacy Jo-Ann Paine from the Caroline Chisholm High School	Student Design	2,000,000
2001	Centenary of Federation – Queensland	Student Jenifer Gray from the Ingham State High School	Student Design	2,300,000
2001	Centenary of Federation – Victoria	Students Ryan Ladd & Mark Kennedy from the Lara Lake Primary School	Student Design	2,000,000
2001	Centenary of Federation – Norfolk Island	Student Megan Cunnings from the Norfolk Island Central School	Student Design	2,200,000
2001	Centenary of Federation – Northern Territory	Student Lisa Brett from the Leanyer School in Darwin	Student Design	2,100,000
2001	Centenary of Federation – Western Australia	Student Janice Ng from the Forrestfield Senior High School	Student Design	2,400,000
2001	Centenary of Federation – South Australia	Student Lisa Murphy from the Yankalilla Area School	Student Design	2,400,000
2001	Centenary of Federation – Tasmania	Student Abbey MacDonald from the Launceston Church Grammar School	Student Design	2,160,000
2003	Australia's Volunteers	Vladimir Gottwald		7,600,000
2005	60th Anniversary of the end of World War II	Vladimir Gottwald	WORLD WAR 1939-1945 COMING HOME lettering.	32,057,000
2010	The Australian Tax Office Centenary 2010			11,740,000
2011	Wedding of Prince William and Catherine Middleton			10,123,000
2011	International Women's Day 100th anniversary 1911–2011			6,252,000
2011	International Year of Volunteers Plus 10			6,100,000
2013	Canberra Centenary		Aerial view of Canberra City layout	6,200,000
2016	50th Anniversary of Decimal Currency		2016 obverse design to celebrate the 50th anniversary of decimal currency	4,510,000

== 10 cent coin ==
Year issued	Commemorative subject	Reverse designer	Reverse design	Mintage figures
2016	50th Anniversary of decimal currency	Stuart Devlin	2016 obverse design to celebrate the 50th anniversary of decimal currency	6,200,000

== 5 cent coin ==
Year issued	Commemorative subject	Reverse designer	Reverse design	Mintage figures
2016	50th Anniversary of Decimal Currency	Stuart Devlin	2016 obverse design to celebrate the 50th anniversary of decimal currency	4,798,000
