= Elisabetta Picenardi =

Blessed Elisabetta Picenardi OSM
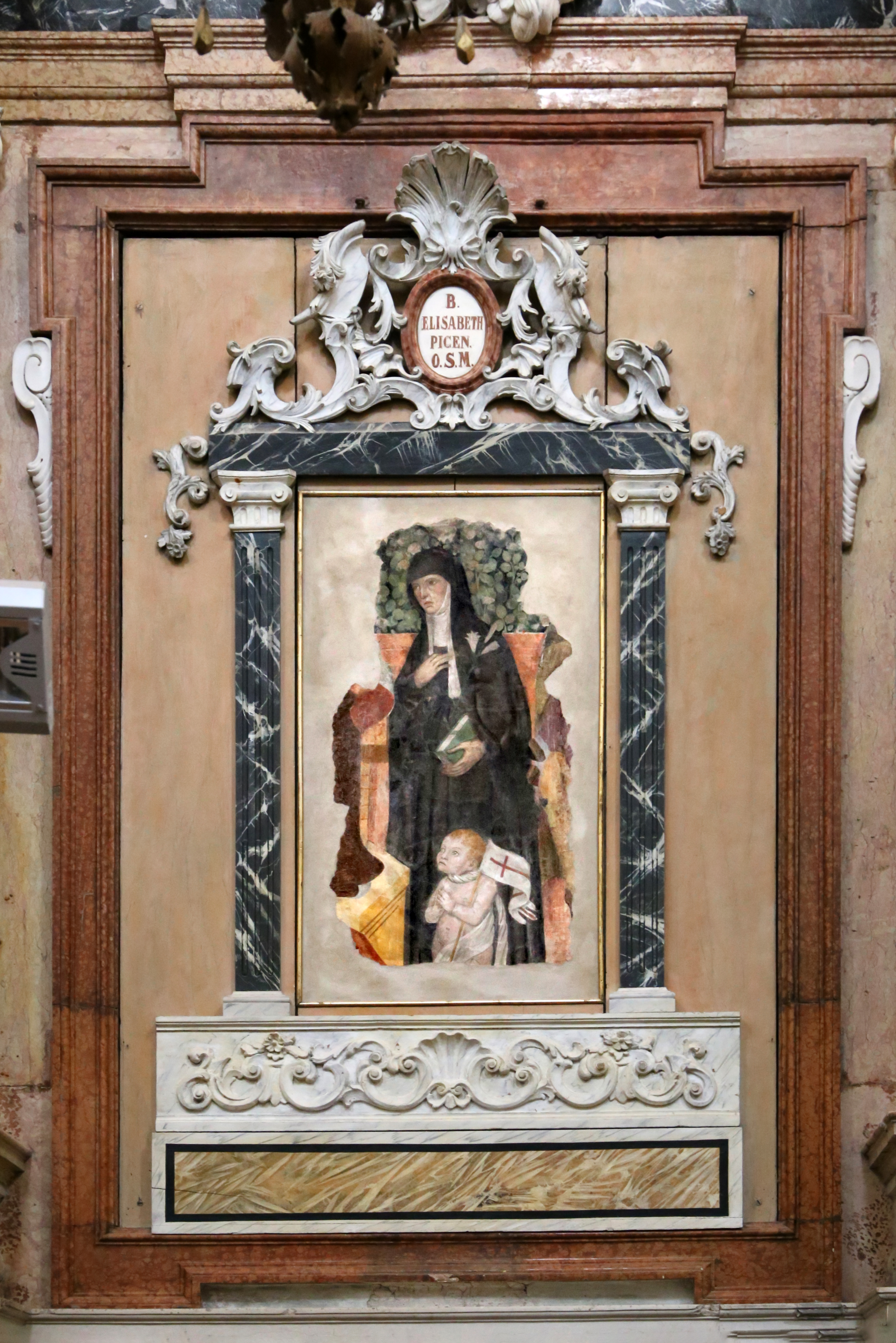
- Born: 1428; Mantua, Captaincy-General of Mantua
- Died: 19 February 1468 (aged 39); Mantua, Margrave of Mantua
- Venerated in: Roman Catholic Church
- Beatified: 10 November 1804, Saint Peter's Basilica by Pope Pius VII
- Feast: 19 February

Elisabetta Picenardi, also known as Elisabeth of Mantua, (1428 – 19 February 1468) was an Italian tertiary of the Servite Order. Picenardi was born in Mantua into a noble family and, despite pressure to wed a nobleman, insisted instead on pursuing the religious path alongside her sister.

== Life ==
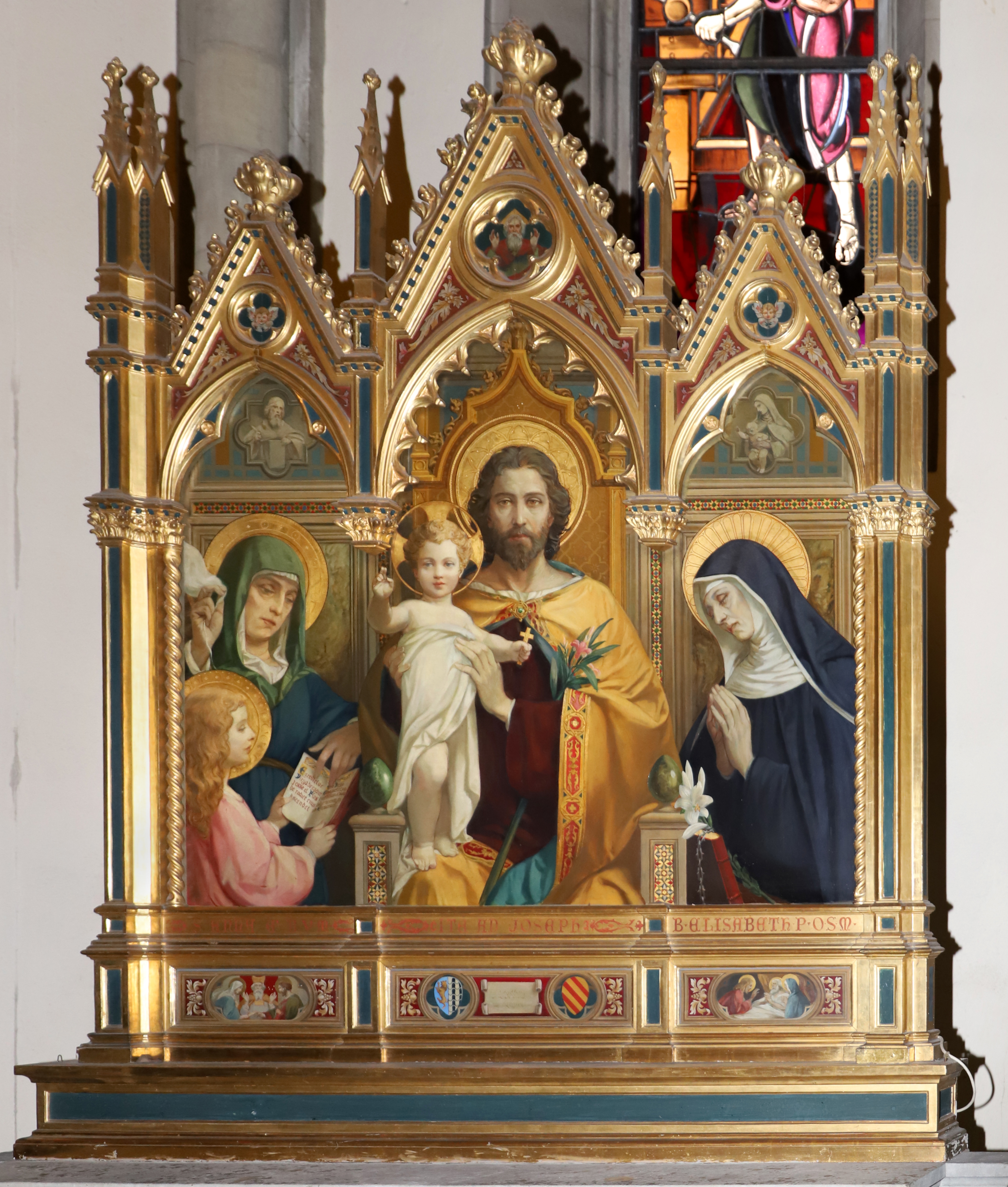
Triptych by Giuseppe Cassioli depicting Saint Anne teaching the young Virgin Mary how to read (left panel), Saint Joseph holding the Christ Child (central panel), and Elisabetta Picenardi (right panel)

Elisabetta Picenardi was born in Mantua in 1428 to the nobleman Leonardo Picenardi and Paola Nuvoloni. Her father served as a steward of the Marquis Francesco I Gonzaga.

Elisabetta received some formal education as a noble and received her religious education from her mother while her father instructed her in Latin. Her mother died sometime during her childhood which left her father to care for her and her sister Orsina. In her childhood she lived near the church of San Barnaba that the Servite Order managed.

Her father would later pressure his daughter into entering in marriage with a noble. Both Picenardi and her sister became members of the Servite Third Order in 1448 and Elisabetta became noted amongst her fellow sisters for her personal holiness and gentleness of spirit which prompted other women to join the Servites. She clothed herself in a hair shirt and would fasten an iron belt four fingers in width to herself which remained until her death. Picenardi recited the Divine Office and would receive the Eucharist often from Fra Barnabas who would also hear her confession. Her father died in 1465.

Her sister Orsina was married to the nobleman Bartolomeo Gorni and Picenardi lived with them from her father's death for the remainder of her life. Picenardi died in 1468. Her grave soon became a place of miracles.

== Beatification ==
Her beatification received formal confirmation on 20 November 1804 once Pope Pius VII affirmed her popular devotion in the Servite Order and the dioceseses of Mantua and Cremona.
