= Chester Porter =

Australian lawyer (1926–2021)

- Born: 15 March 1926
- Died: 15 March 2021 (aged 95)
- Education: University of Sydney
- Occupation: Barrister
- Title: Queen's Counsel (QC)
- Partner: Jean Featherstone,
- Children: Dorothy Porter; Mary Porter; Josie McSkimming
- Parent(s): Coralie & Frederick Porter

Chester Alexander Porter QC (15 March 1926 – 15 March 2021) was a prominent Australian barrister.

== Early life ==
Chester's father was Frederick Porter. His mother Coralie was born into a Jewish family but later converted to Christianity. When asked about his faith he at times referred to himself as a 'Christian Jew'. Porter began high school at Barker College before going on to win a scholarship to Shore and finishing his high schooling there. While at Shore, Porter was captain of the debating team. He later graduated in law at the University of Sydney.

While a law student, Porter purportedly witnessed his friend Frank McAlary dance for a cameraman after the announcement of the end of the Second World War. He has long since publicly supported the theory that McAlary was the Dancing Man.

He was admitted to the Bar in 1948, aged 21, the youngest person ever admitted to the bar at the time, and subsequently the second youngest, in history, after Norman Jenkyn who was a few months younger.

== Legal career ==
Porer was notable for his participation in the Voyager and Chamberlain Royal Commissions. He defended notorious crooked police officer Roger Rogerson, on bribery charges against fellow police officer Michael Drury. He was portrayed by John Hargreaves in the miniseries Blue Murder, about the trial of Roger Rogerson. His defence of Judge John Foord was considered so miraculous that the headline "Chester Porter walks on water" was used in a newspaper.

Porter was nicknamed the 'smiling funnel web' because of his charm, great politeness and his forensic questioning. He advocated at the Bar for 52 years, joining in 1948, and becoming a Queen's Counsel in 1974.

Porter urged improvement in forensic science as a result of his legal work and the Chamberlain Royal Commission. His efforts and those of others resulted in the National Institute of Forensic Science.

When he retired from the Bar in 2000 the Bar Council of New South Wales appointed him an Honorary Life Member for his exceptional service to the law.

Porter was interviewed for the New South Wales Bar Association Oral History project.

== Writing ==
After retirement, Porter became an author. His books are:

- Walking on Water: A Life in the Law, Random House Australia, 2004
- The Gentle Art of Persuasion: How to Argue Effectively, Random House, 2005
- The Conviction of the Innocent: How the Law Can Let Us down, Random House, 2007

Porter also wrote some articles for Bar News.

== Personal life ==
Chester married chemistry teacher Jean Featherstone. They had three daughters, the poet Dorothy Porter, Mary Porter, a veterinarian, and Josie McSkimming, a social worker and academic.

=== Membership ===
Porter was a member of:

- Liberal Party of New South Wales until the late 1960s;
- New South Wales Dickens Society;

Jean and Chester were founding members of the NSW Dickens Society and were awarded the Percy Fitzgerald Award on 25 October 2016 for their support of the society since its founding in October 2002.

- Rostrum;

Porter joined Rostrum shortly after going to the bar when there weren't many Rostrum clubs in Australia. In his book The Gentle Art of Persuasion he attributes his improved speaking skills to Rostrum and said that becoming a "Critic in Rostrum one learns a great deal".

Porter won Rostrum NSW "Speaker of the Year" in the 1986 competition.

== Later years ==
Porter retired from the law in the year 2000. He then published his three books on his life and the law.

He died on Monday 17 March 2021 aged 95. He was survived by his wife, Jean, and two daughters, Mary Davis and Dr Josie McSkimming.
