= Giuseppe Cassioli =

Italian painter and sculptor

- Born: 26 October 1865; Florence, Kingdom of Italy
- Died: 5 October 1942 (aged 76)
- Known for: Painting, Sculpture, Olympic medal design
- Notable work: Olympic medal design (used 1928–2004), Monument to Gioachino Rossini at Basilica of Santa Croce, Bronze door for Florence Cathedral
- Father: Amos Cassioli

Giuseppe Cassioli (26 October 1865 – 5 October 1942) was an Italian painter and sculptor known for his Summer Olympic Games medal design. Many of his paintings are on display at the Museo Cassioli di Pittura senese dell'Ottocento in Asciano, Tuscany.

== Biography ==
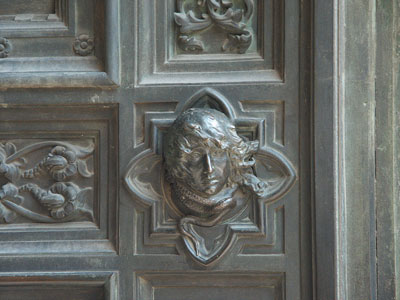
Bronze self-portrait of Giuseppe Cassioli

Cassioli was born in Florence, Italy to Amos Cassioli, who himself was a well-known painter and went on to mentor his son. Tito Sarrocchi taught Cassioli techniques in sculpting. In 1885 he exhibited at the Academy of Fine Arts in Siena with a painting inspired by Victor Hugo's Toilers of the Sea.

He worked in the memorial hall of the Palazzo Pubblico in Siena. In 1900 he created the monument to composer Gioachino Rossini in the Basilica of Santa Croce, which was followed by sculpted decorations for the stock exchange in Odessa, and statues and carvings for Arezzo Cathedral. He also produced several paintings for the Church of the Seven Holy Founders in Florence.

Cassioli sculpted the right-hand bronze door for Florence Cathedral which brought about years of criticism and harassment to the point where he created a self-portrait depicting himself being suffocated by a snake.

=== The Olympic medal ===
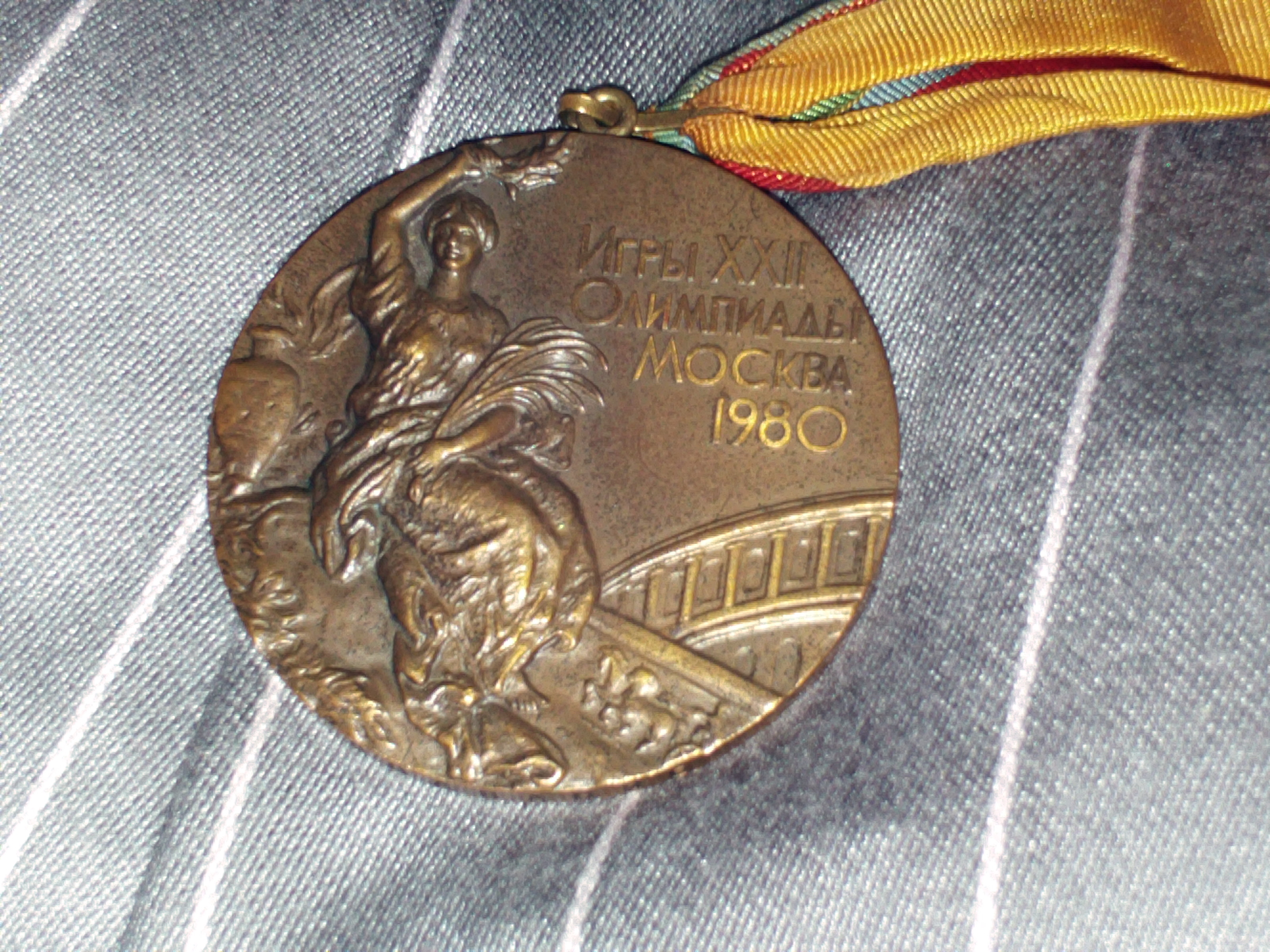
The bronze medal from the 1980 Summer Olympics showing Cassioli's design

In 1923 the International Olympic Committee (IOC) launched a competition for sculptors to design the medals for the Summer Olympic Games. Cassioli's Trionfo design was chosen as the winner in 1928. The obverse incorporated Nike, the Greek goddess of victory, holding a winner's crown and palm with a depiction of the Colosseum in the background. In the top right section of the medal a space was left for the name of the Olympic host and the Games numeral. The reverse features a crowd of people carrying a triumphant athlete. His winning design was first presented at the 1928 Summer Olympics in Amsterdam. The competition saw this design used for 40 years until the 1972 Summer Olympics in Munich became the first Games with a different design for the reverse side of the medal.

Cassioli's design continued to inspire the obverse of the medal for many more years, though recreated each time, with the Olympic host and numeral updated. The trend ended in 2004 due to the negative publicity in reaction to the design of medal for the 2000 Summer Olympics in Sydney. Wojciech Pietranik, the designer of the medal, along with the organisers of the Games were criticised by the Greek press for using the Roman Colosseum rather than the Greek Parthenon. Pietranik defended himself by stating that the Australian Olympic Committee had instructed him to use Cassioli's 1928 design as a template. The error had remained for 76 years until a new style depicting the Panathinaiko Stadium was introduced at the 2004 Summer Olympics in Athens.

== Gallery ==
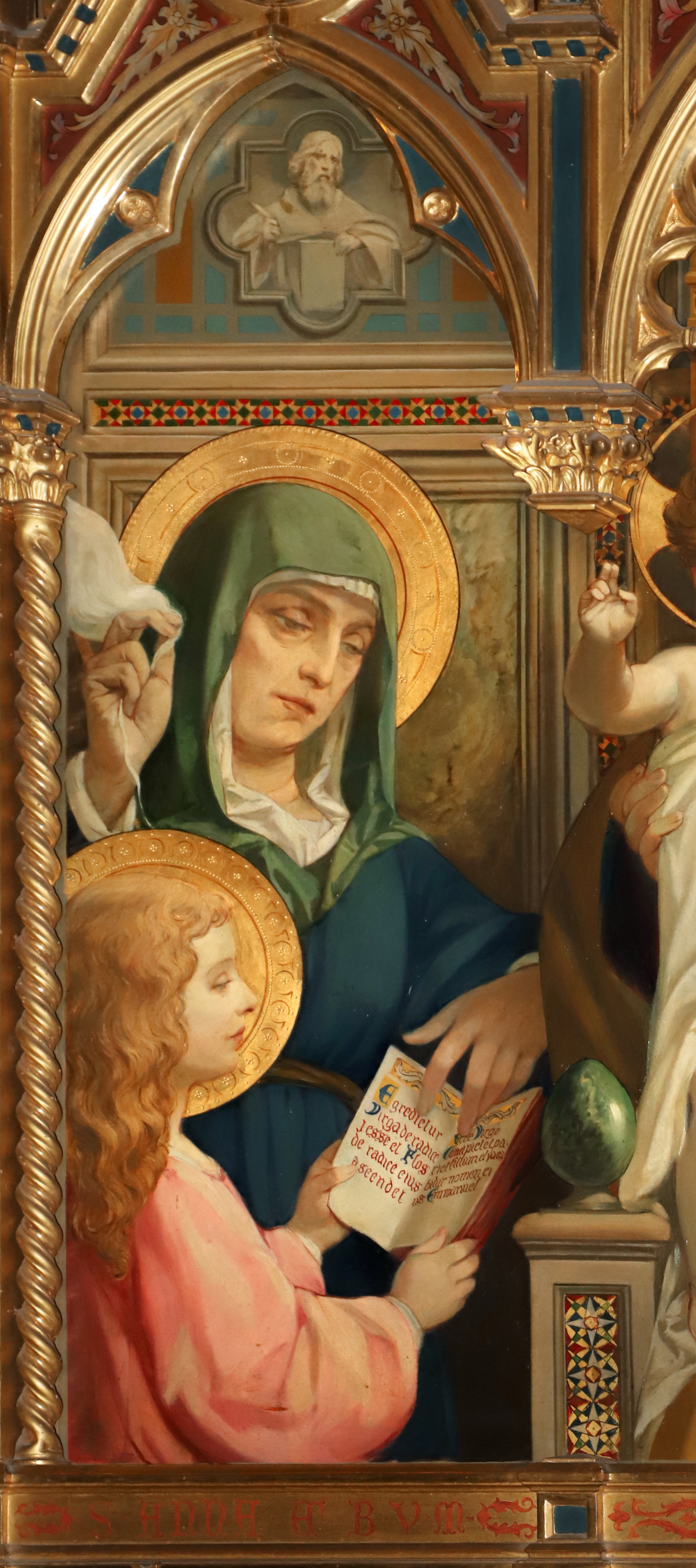
Left panel of triptych depicting Saint Anne teaching the young Virgin Mary how to read

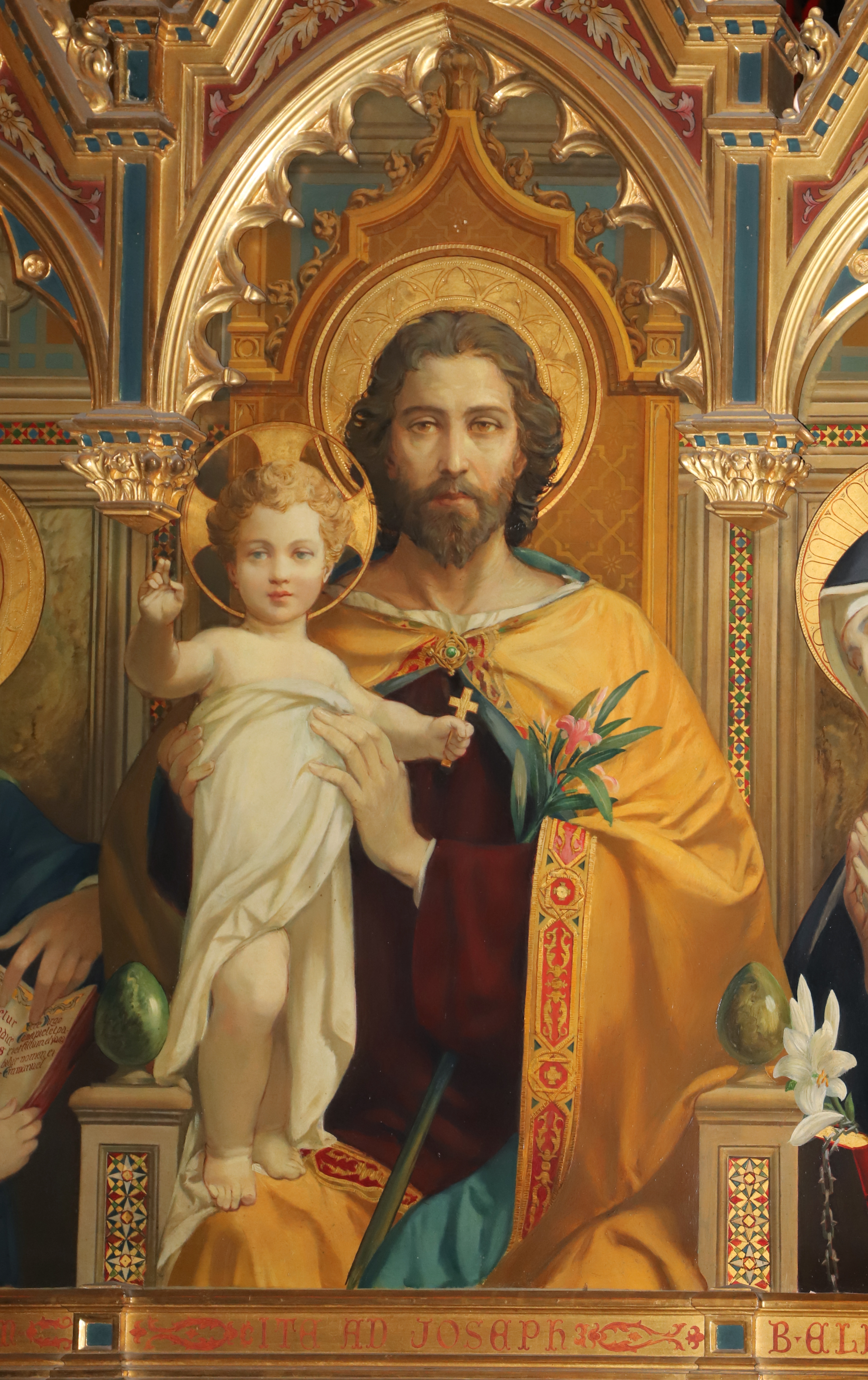
Central panel of triptych depicting Saint Joseph holding the Christ Child

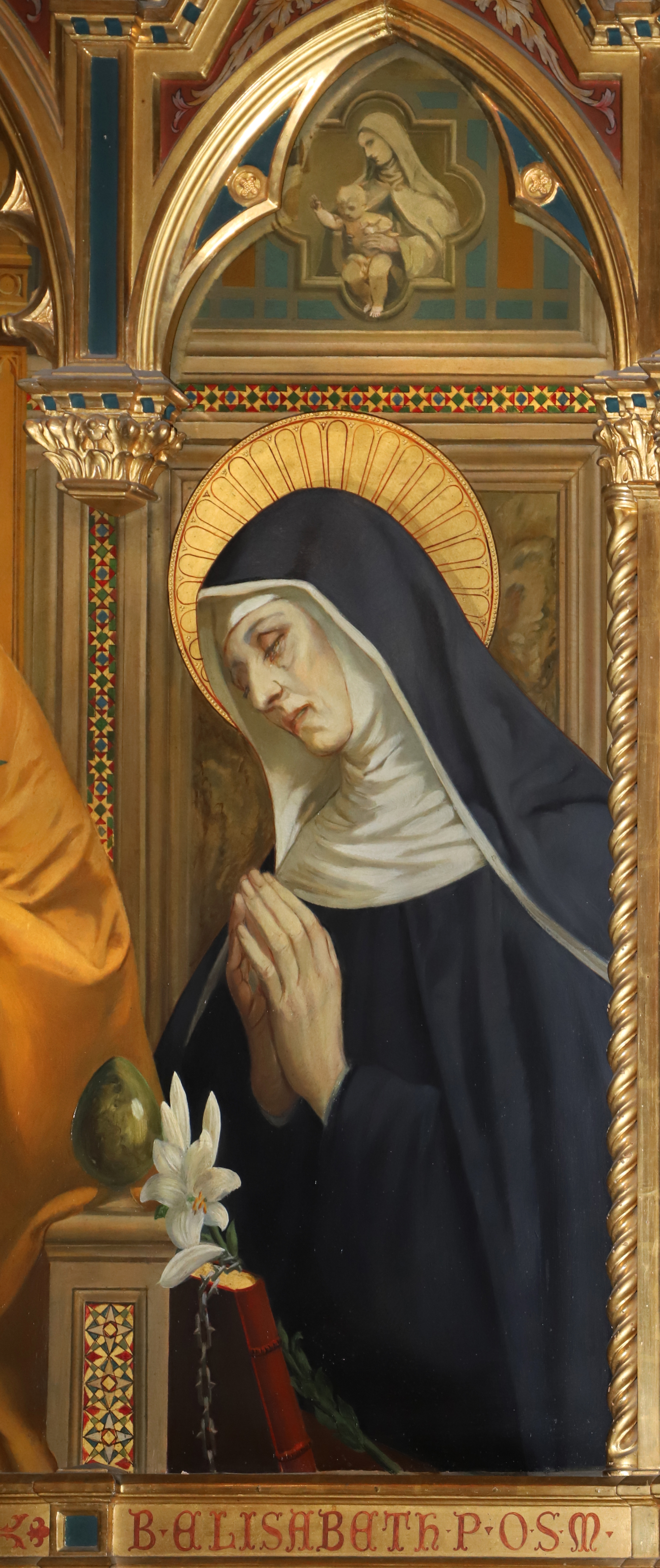
Right panel of triptych depicting Elisabetta Picenardi

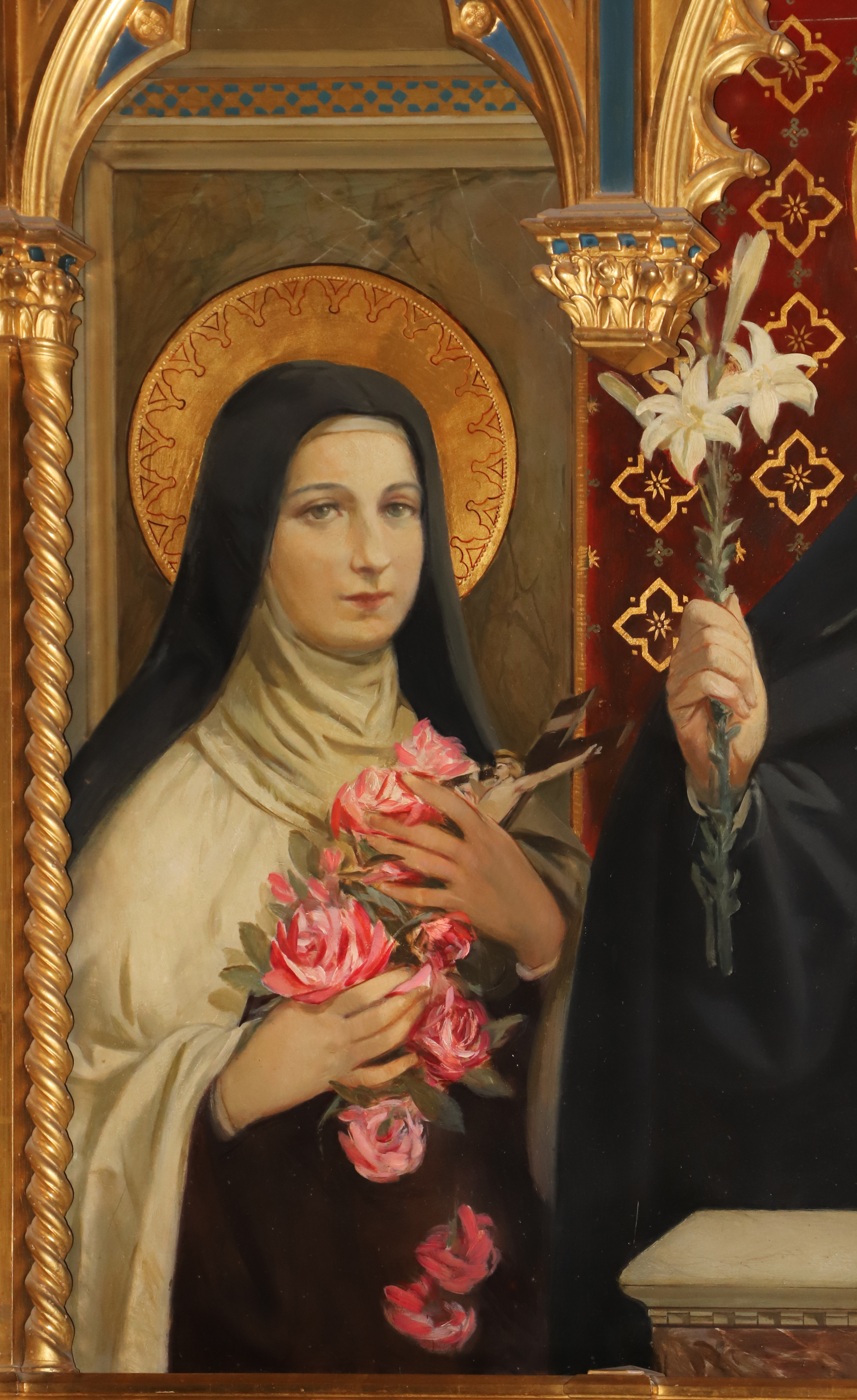
Left panel of triptych depicting Saint Thérèse of Lisieux

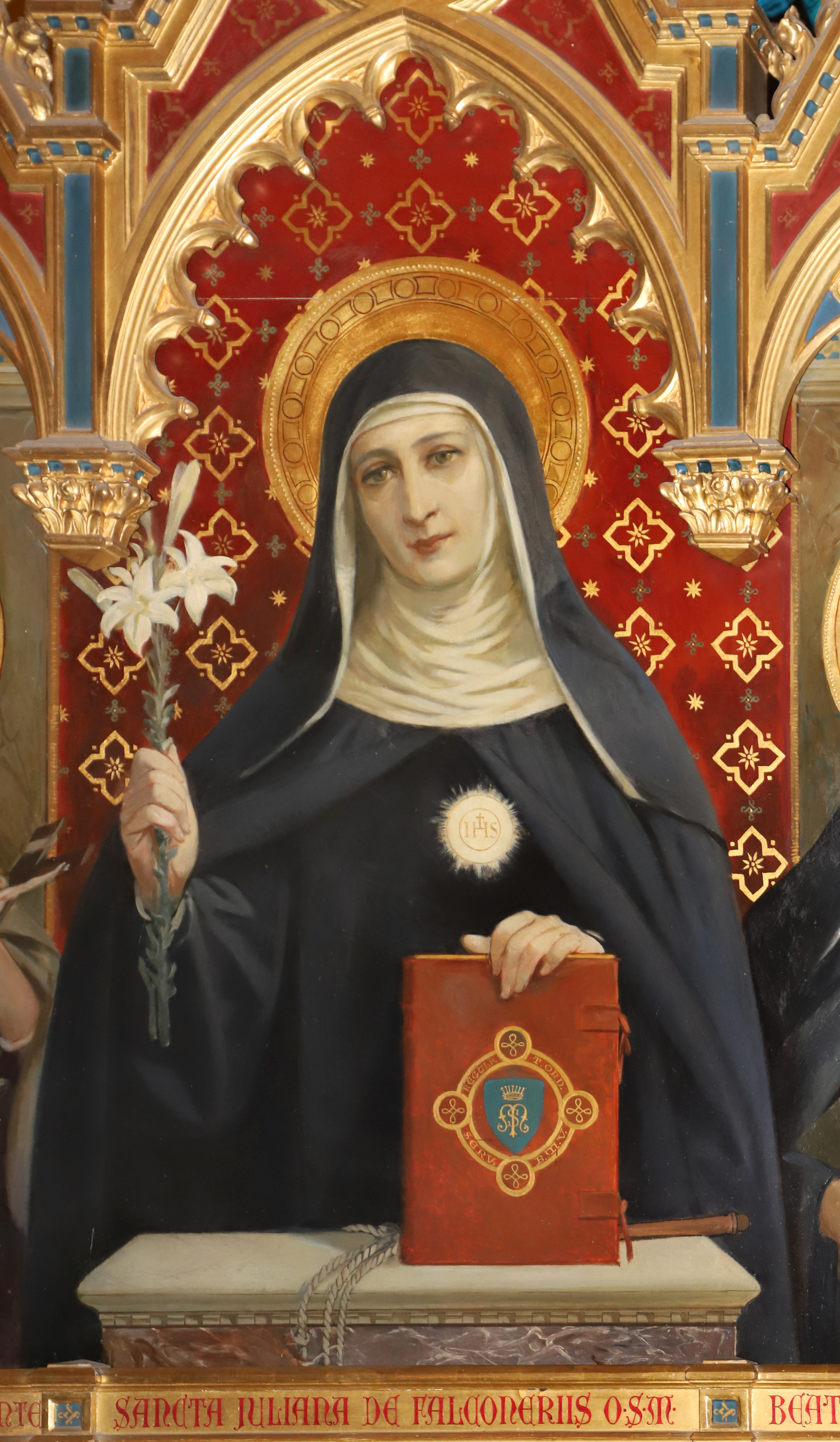
Central panel of triptych depicting Saint Juliana Falconieri

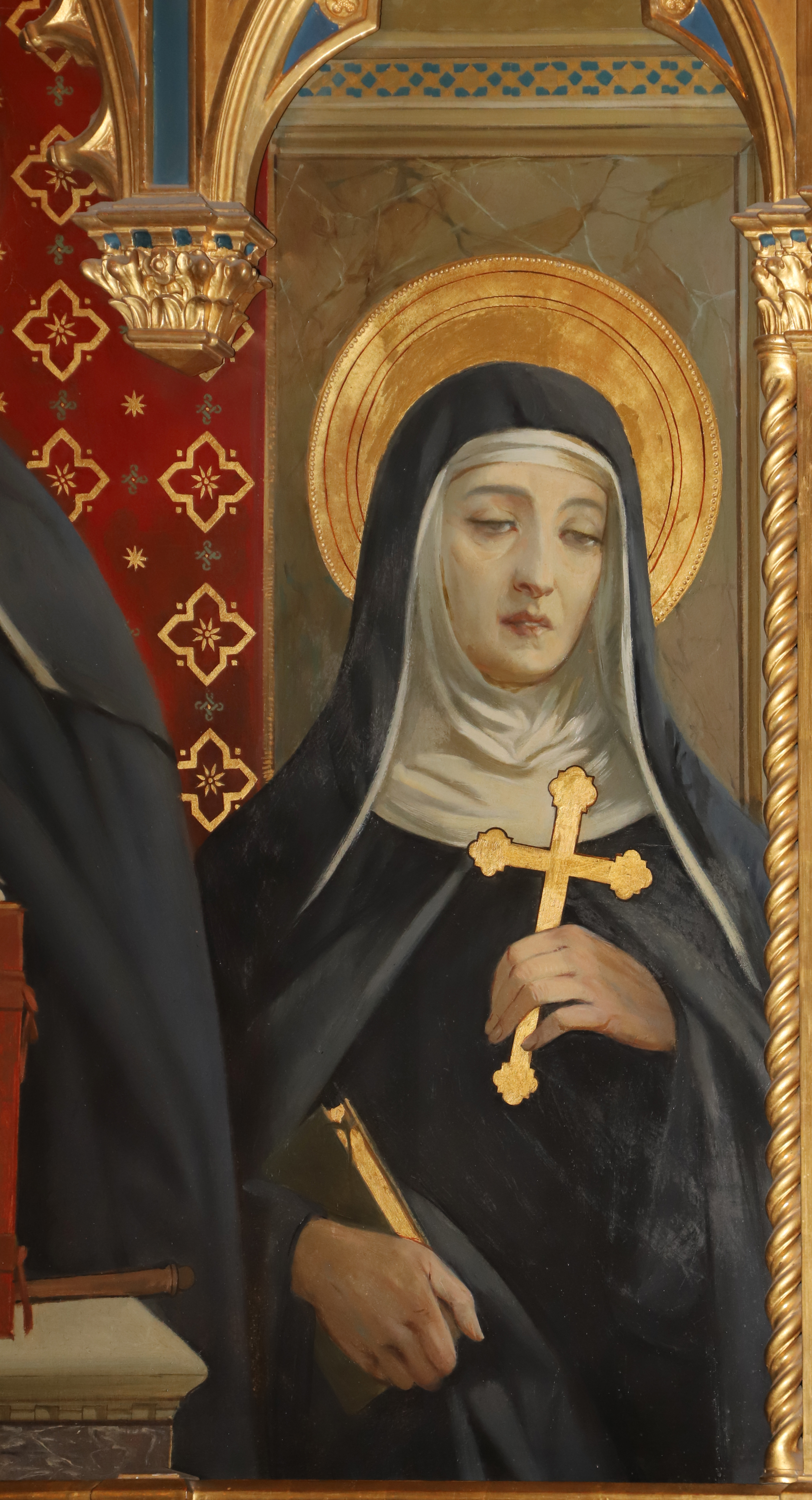
Right panel of triptych depicting Giovanna Soderini
