= Dancing Man =

Photograph taken in Australia, August 1945

Dancing Man, Sydney, Australia, 15 August 1945

Dancing Man is the name given to a photograph of a man who was filmed dancing on the street in Sydney, Australia, after the end of World War II. On 15 August 1945, a cameraman took note of a man's joyful expression and dance and asked him to do it once again. The man consented and was caught on motion picture film in an Australian edition of the newsreel Movietone News. The film and stills from it have taken on iconic status in Australian history and culture, and symbolise joyous elation to the war's end.

== Identity ==
There has been much debate as to the identity of the dancing man. Frank McAlary, a retired barrister, claims that he was the man photographed pirouetting in Elizabeth Street, Sydney, on 15 August 1945. A Queen's Counsel, Chester Porter, and a former Compensation Court judge, Barry Egan, both claim to have seen McAlary being filmed dancing. The television programme Where Are They Now?, produced by Australia's Seven Network, attempted to solve the mystery of the dancing man's identity. The network hired a forensic scientist who examined the film reel and picture and came to the conclusion that it was indeed McAlary.

The Royal Australian Mint, however, chose to portray Ern Hill as the dancing man on a 2005 issue $1 coin commemorating 60 years since the World War II armistice. Hill has made a statement: "The camera came along and I did a bit of a jump around." The coin, sculpted by Wojciech Pietranik, does not bear any name.

Rebecca Keenan of Film World Pty. Ltd., says the dancer may be Patrick Blackall. Mr. Blackall has claimed, "I'm the genuine dancing man," and has signed statutory declarations that he is the man in the film. These remain not alone as many others maintain a claim to the moment, it is not conclusive and may never be.

Frank A. Epton, a retired Chartered Accountant living in Alstonville, New South Wales before he died in February 2013, claimed that he was one of the soldiers in the background of the still image of the dancing man (the soldier without a hat). Papers and photos found in his possession during the administration of his estate support his assertion.

== See also ==
- V-J Day in Times Square, an image of V-J Day in Manhattan
