= Wojciech Pietranik =

Polish artist and sculptor

Wojciech Pietranik (born 25 March 1950) is a Polish artist and sculptor best known for his design work for coins and medals.

Pietranik was born in Gdańsk, Poland, and he achieved a Masters in Sculpture from the Academy of Fine Arts. He did freelance work from 1975 before moving to Darwin, Australia, in 1985 to become a teacher. Three years later he moved with his family to Canberra. In 1989 he began working for the Royal Australian Mint and his designs have since featured on the reverse of many Australian commemorative coins.

== Sydney Olympics medal ==
Pietranik was one of 18 artists and jewellery designers to be invited to submit a design for the Olympic medal that would be awarded at the 2000 Summer Games, hosted in Sydney. He created a model using plasticine and cast the finished design in plaster, sending his work to the Sydney Organising Committee for the Olympic Games (SOCOG) along with his sketches. The selection committee chose Pietranik's design which, as per the brief, was based on the obverse by Giuseppe Cassioli's Trionfo design which had been used at every Summer Olympic Games since 1928. Pietranik's version had featured the Sydney Opera House on the obverse instead of the traditional Roman Colosseum but the International Olympic Committee decided that the Colosseum should remain. He made the changes and the test strikes were completed. When the design was formally revealed it was criticised by the Greek press for featuring the Colosseum rather than the Greek Parthenon. Despite the criticism, SOCOG decided to continue with the design as it was, noting that there was insufficient time to complete another version and that it would be too costly. The final version of the medal measured 68 mm in diameter, 5 mm in thickness, and weighed 180 grams.

== Exhibition ==
The Royal Australian Mint celebrated Pietranik's 20 years of design and sculpture work with an exhibition in 2010. Striking Art Lasting Impressions housed collections of his coins, the Olympic medal designs, and featured Pietranik as a guest speaker on 30 January 2010.
