= Elena Votsi =

Greek jewelry designer

- Born: 1 January 1964 (age 61); Hydra Island, Kingdom of Greece
- Education: MA in Jewellery & Silversmithing from RCA
- Occupation: Jewellery designer
- Known for: Designing the Olympics medals in 2004

Elena Votsi (Greek: Έλενα Βότση; born 1964 on Hydra island, Kingdom of Greece) is a Greek jewelry designer.

Votsi completed a degree at the School of Fine Arts in Athens in painting, followed by a master's degree at the Royal College of Art in London in jewelry.

In 2003, she won the competition to redesign the Summer Olympic Games medal for the International Olympic Committee, the first time the medal had been changed since 1928. The International Olympic Committee adopted Votsi's design for all future Summer Olympic Games medals.

Her handmade 18-karat gold ring with diamonds won the 2009 Couture Design Award in the category "Best in the New-to-Couture," a category for first-time exhibitors at the Las Vegas show.
