= Sparagmite =

Sparagmite (from the Latin sparagma, meaning "fragment") is an arkosic sandstone, greywacke and conglomerate set of beds so named by Jens Esmark in 1829. Deposited in what is now Scandinavia during the Neoproterozoic Era to early Cambrian time, the sparagmite nappes were transported up to several hundred kilometers during the Caledonian collision. Sparagmite is characterized by high feldspar percentages of microcline.

== See also ==
- Sparagmite Formation
