= Trionfo =

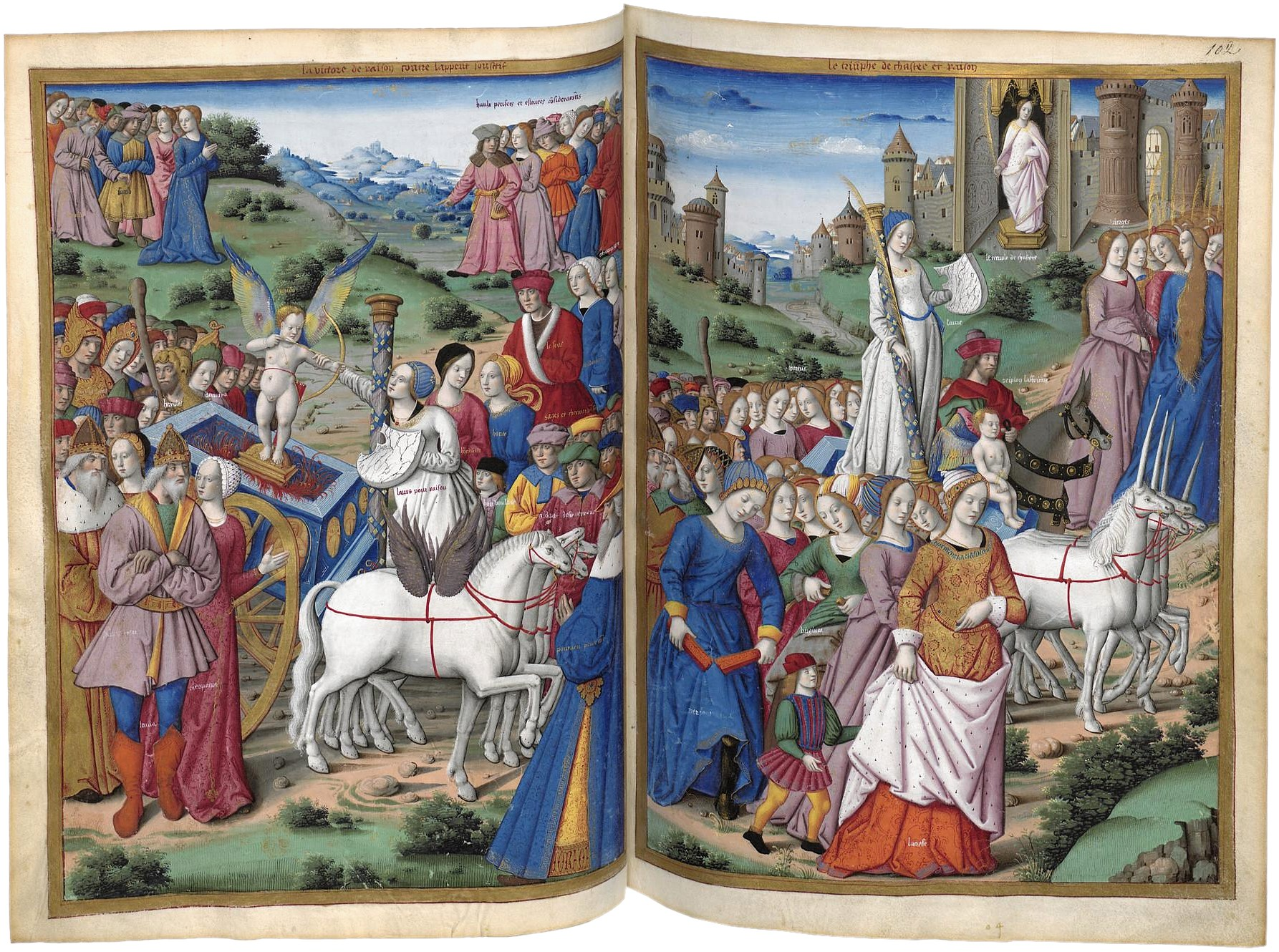
Two of the triumphal cars, carrying Chastity (pulled by unicorns) and Love, from a lavish illuminated manuscript (early 16th century) of Petrach's Triomphi

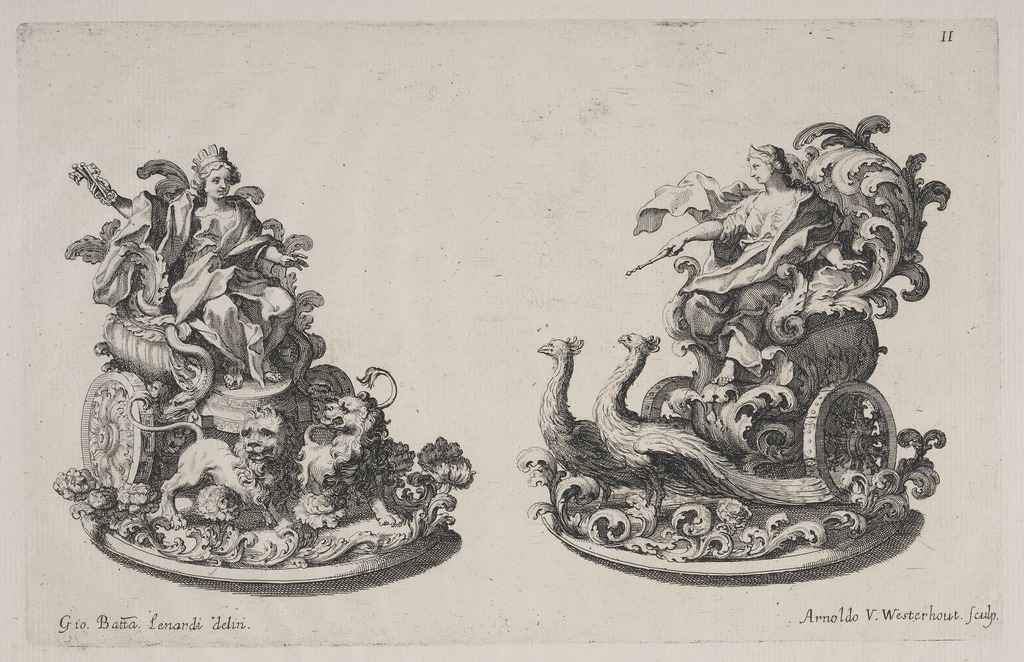
Two elaborate sugar sculpture triomfi, personifications of Earth and Air from the Four Elements, for a dinner given by the Earl of Castlemaine, British Ambassador in Rome, 1687

Trionfo (Italian: [triˈoɱfo]) is an Italian word meaning "triumph", also "triumphal procession", and a triumphal car or float in such a procession. The classical triumphal procession for victorious generals and Emperors known as the Roman Triumph was revived for "Entries" by rulers and similar occasions from the Early Renaissance in 14th and 15th-century Italy, and was a major type of festival, celebrated with great extravagance. The cars are shown as open-roofed, many clearly utilitarian four-wheeled carts dressed-up for the occasion. Others were two-wheeled chariots. In art, they might be pulled by all sorts of exotic animals.

Another specialized sense of the word was an elaborate sugar sculpture; these decorated tables on important occasions in the Renaissance and Baroque periods, especially in Italy and France. Eventually they were replaced by the silver surtout de table or porcelain centrepieces.

The word may derive from a call of triumph during antique triumphal processions: "Io triumpe".

== Art and literature ==
Triumphs were described in literature, the cars often carrying classical gods or personified virtues, with Petrach's Triomphi (1374) being extremely influential, for example on Hypnerotomachia Poliphili (1499). This had woodcut illustrations, and such scenes were very popular in art, perhaps culminating in the enormous woodcut Large Triumphal Carriage by Albrecht Dürer (1522), a triumphal car carrying the Emperor Maximilian that is the climax of the Triumphs of Maximilian (several artists). The Triumphs of Caesar by Andrea Mantegna (by 1492) were also very influential.

== Other ==
The Italian sculptor Giuseppe Cassioli named his Olympic medal design Trionfo. First used in 1928, the design was used for Summer Olympic Games until it was replaced at the 2004 Olympic Games.

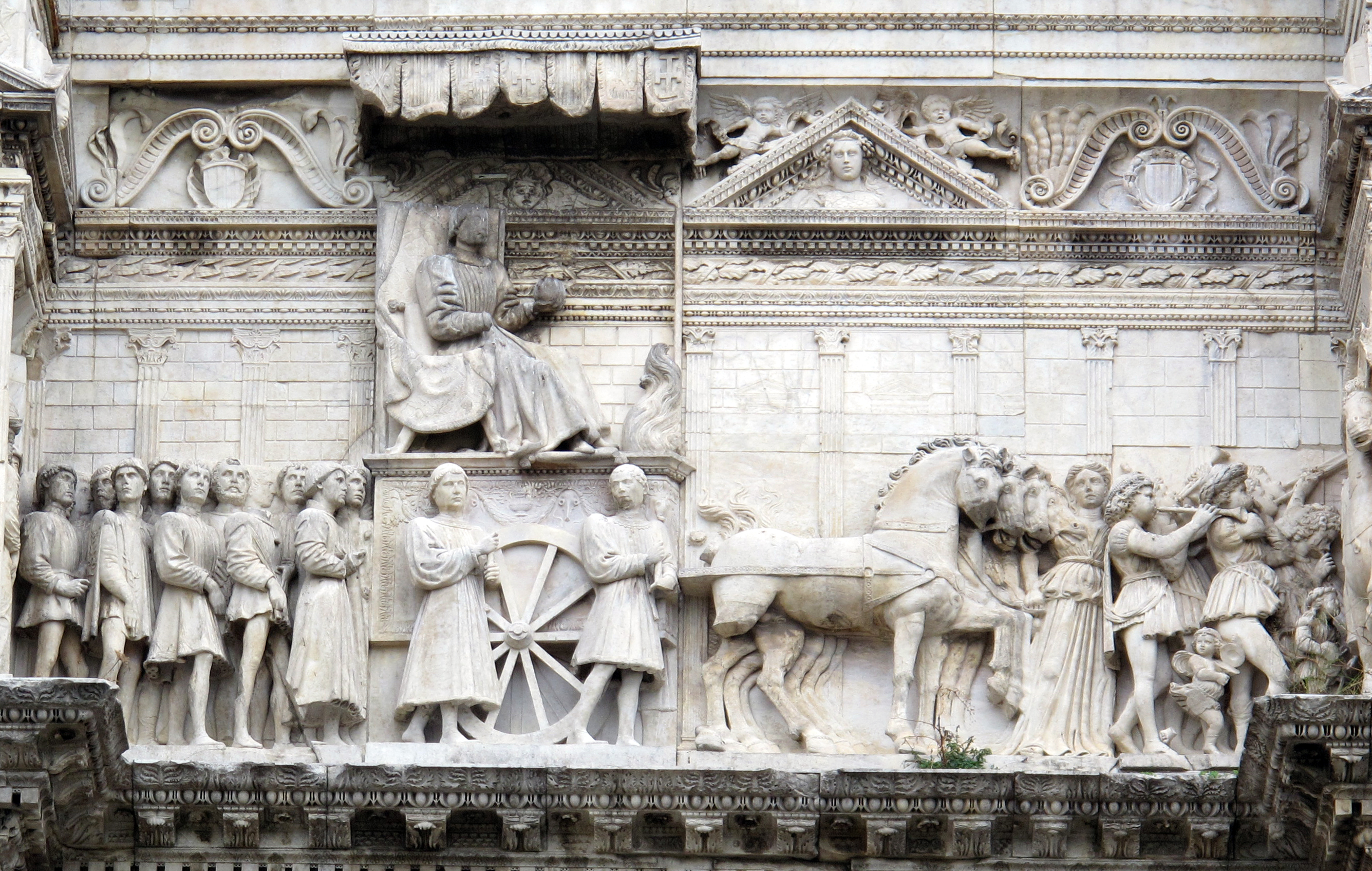
Relief on the Castel Nuovo, Naples, 1470. It shows the entry of Alfonso V of Aragon after taking the city.

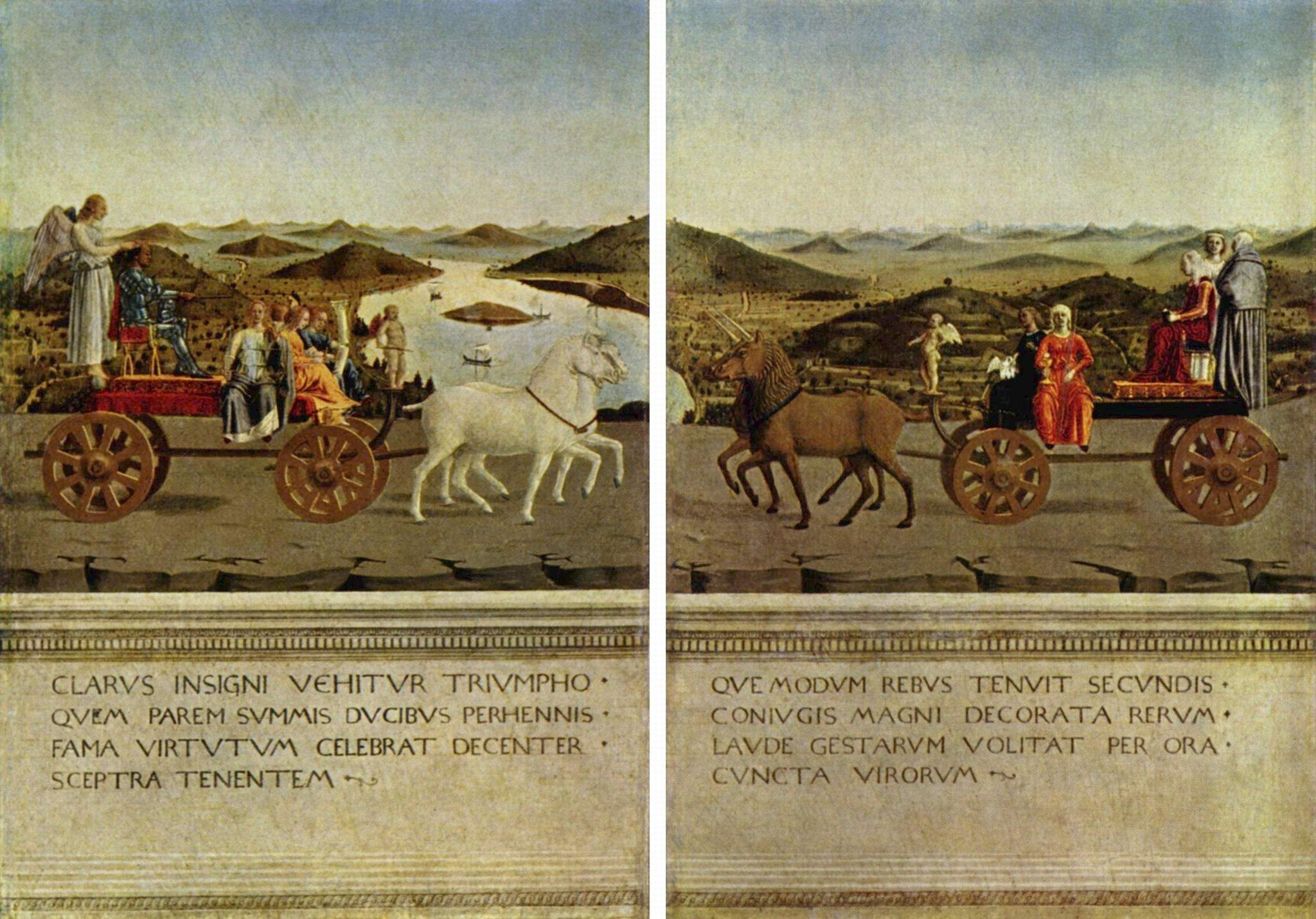
Allegories on the back of the double portrait of Battista Sforza and Federico Montefeltro, by Piero della Francesca, c. 1465-1472. Horses pull Federico’s car and Battista’s is pulled by unicorns.

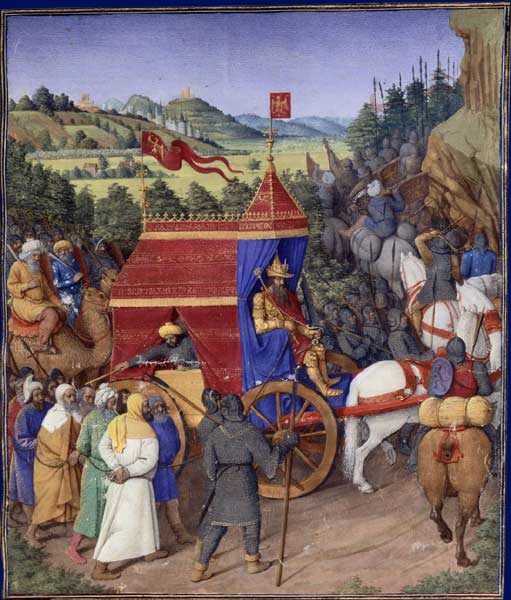
Triumph of Jehoshaphat, Jean Fouquet, 1470–75.

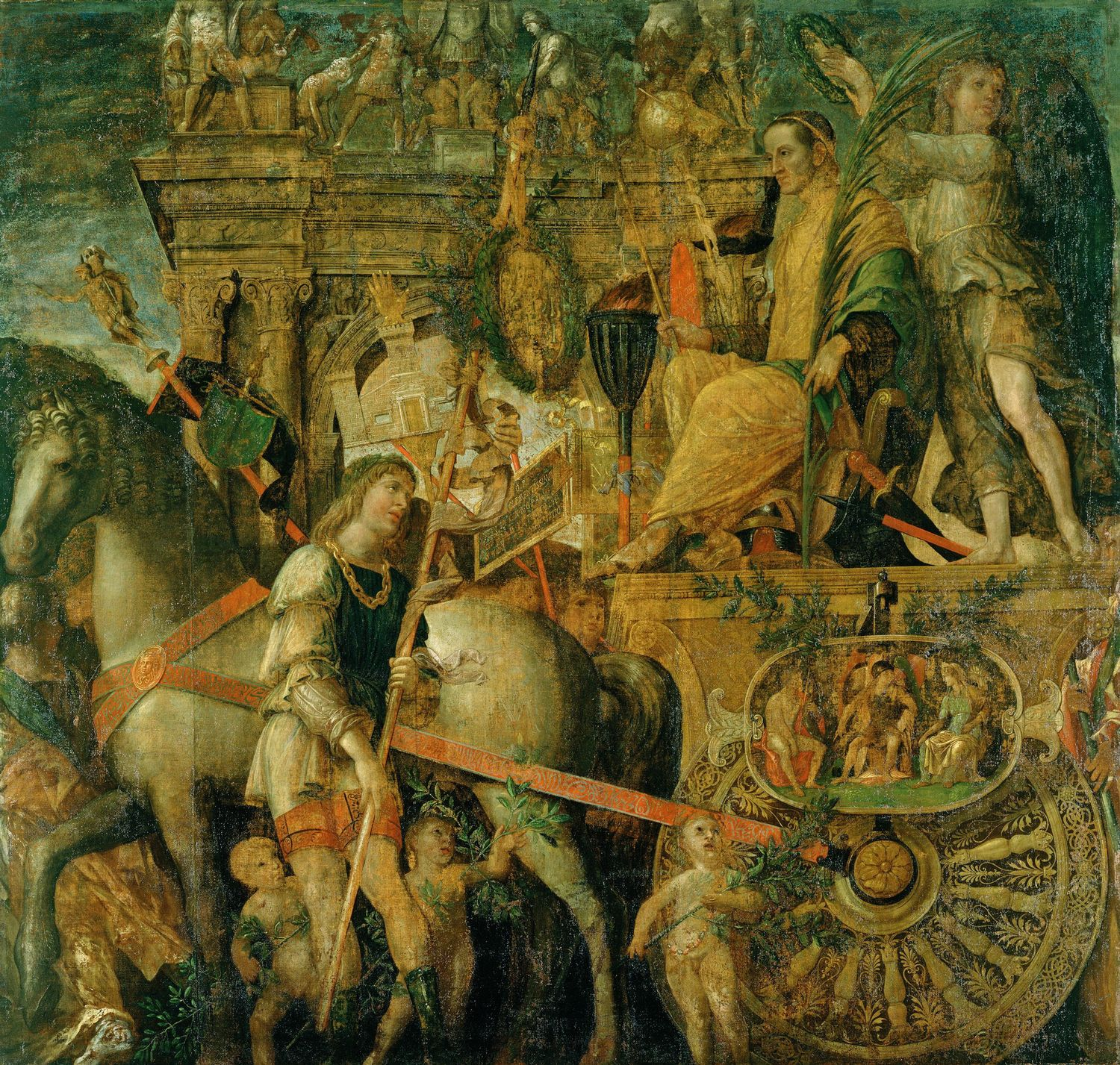
Julius Caesar in his truiumphal car, in one of the nine scenes of the Triumphs of Caesar by Andrea Mantegna (by 1492)

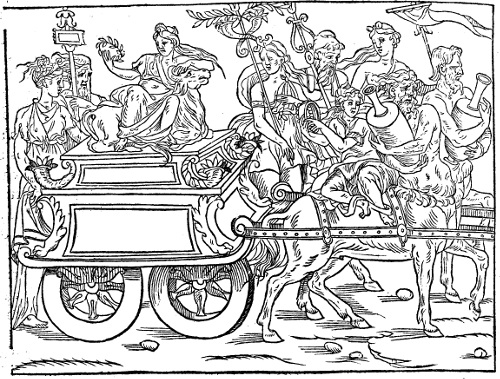
Woodcut illustration to Hypnerotomachia Poliphili, with centaurs pulling the car, 1499.

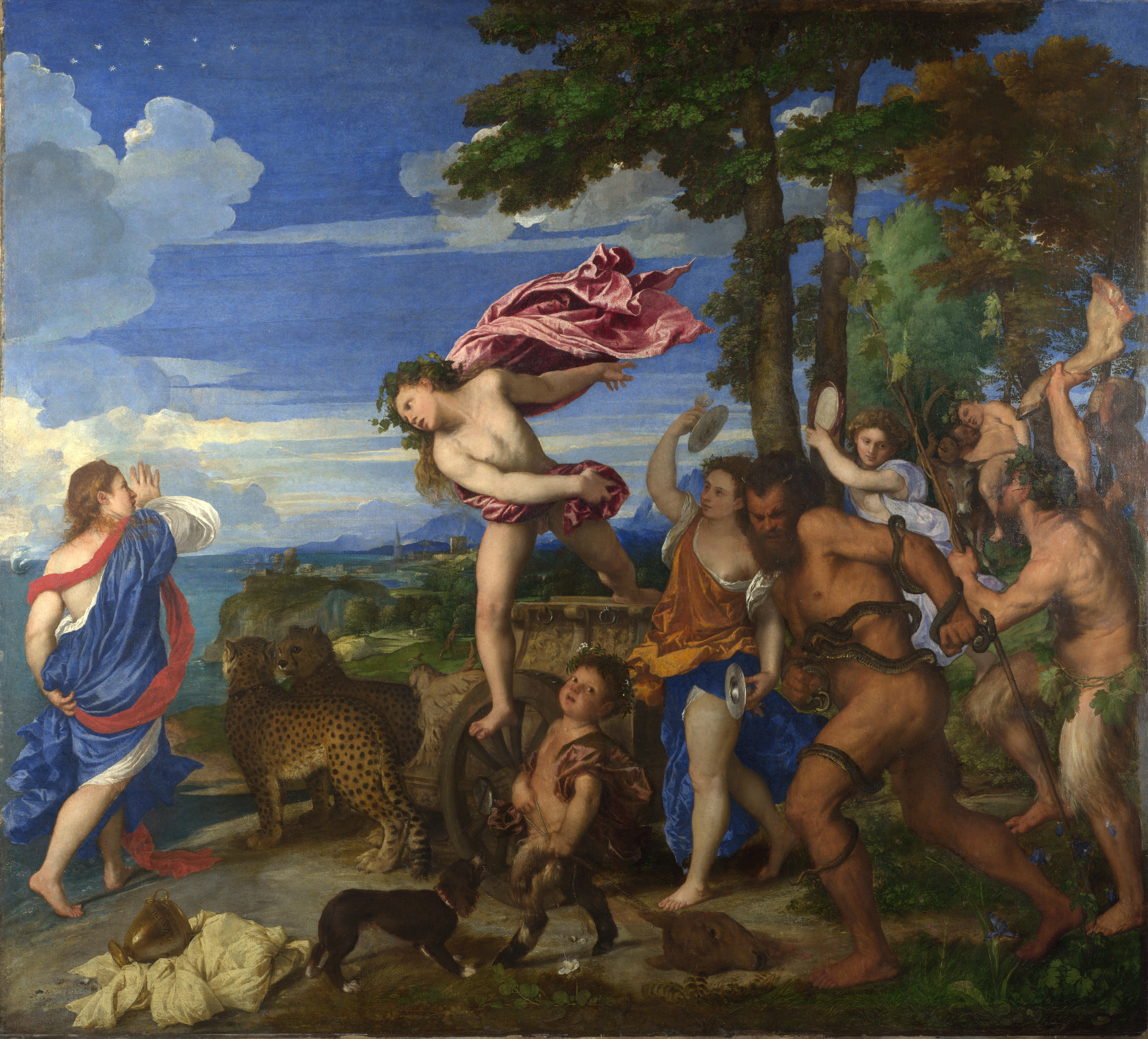
Leopards pull Bacchus's car in Titian's Bacchus and Ariadne (1523)

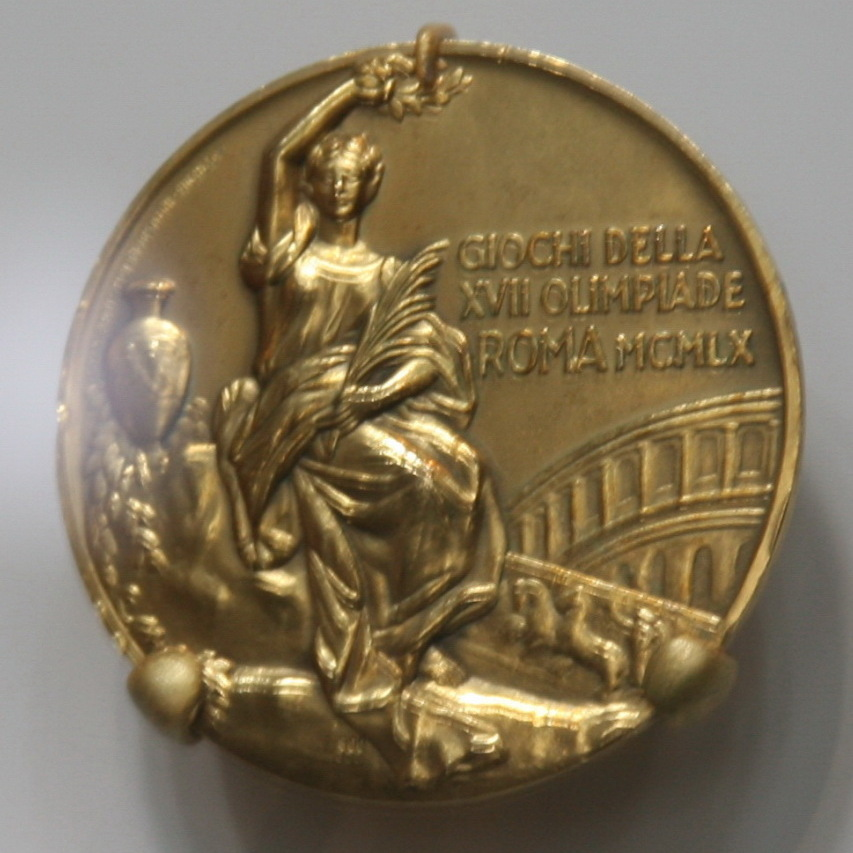
The Trionfo design of Giuseppe Cassioli on a 1960 Olympic medal
