= Olympian 8 =

Olympian 8, 'For Alcimedon of Aegina', is an ode by the 5th century BC Greek poet Pindar.

== Background ==
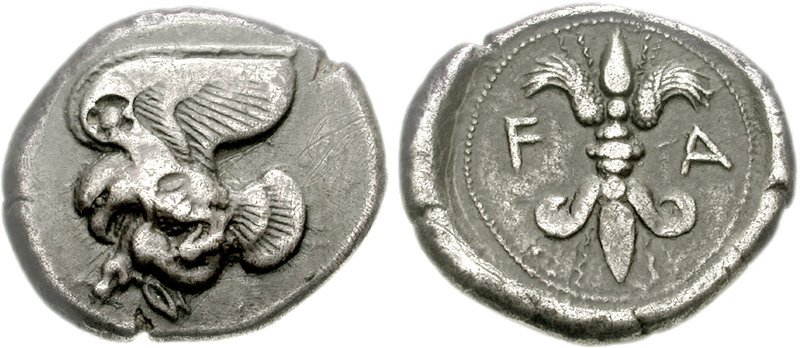
Stater of Olympia, 468–452 BC. Flying eagle clutching hare (obv.) Winged thunderbolt with volutes (rev.)

Aegina, originally known as Oenone, was said to have derived its new name from a daughter of the river-god Asopus, who was carried off to the island by Zeus and there bare him a son named Aeacus. The island was colonised first by Achaeans, and afterwards by Dorians from Epidaurus.

The victor, Alcimedon, was a Blepsiad of the stock of Aeacus (75). His grandfather was still living (70), but he had lost his father and his uncle (81 f). His brother had been a victor at Nemea (15), and his trainer was the famous Melesias of Athens (53–66).

The ode was probably composed at short notice, and was sung at Olympia, immediately after the victory, during the procession to the great altar of Zeus in the Altis.

== Summary ==
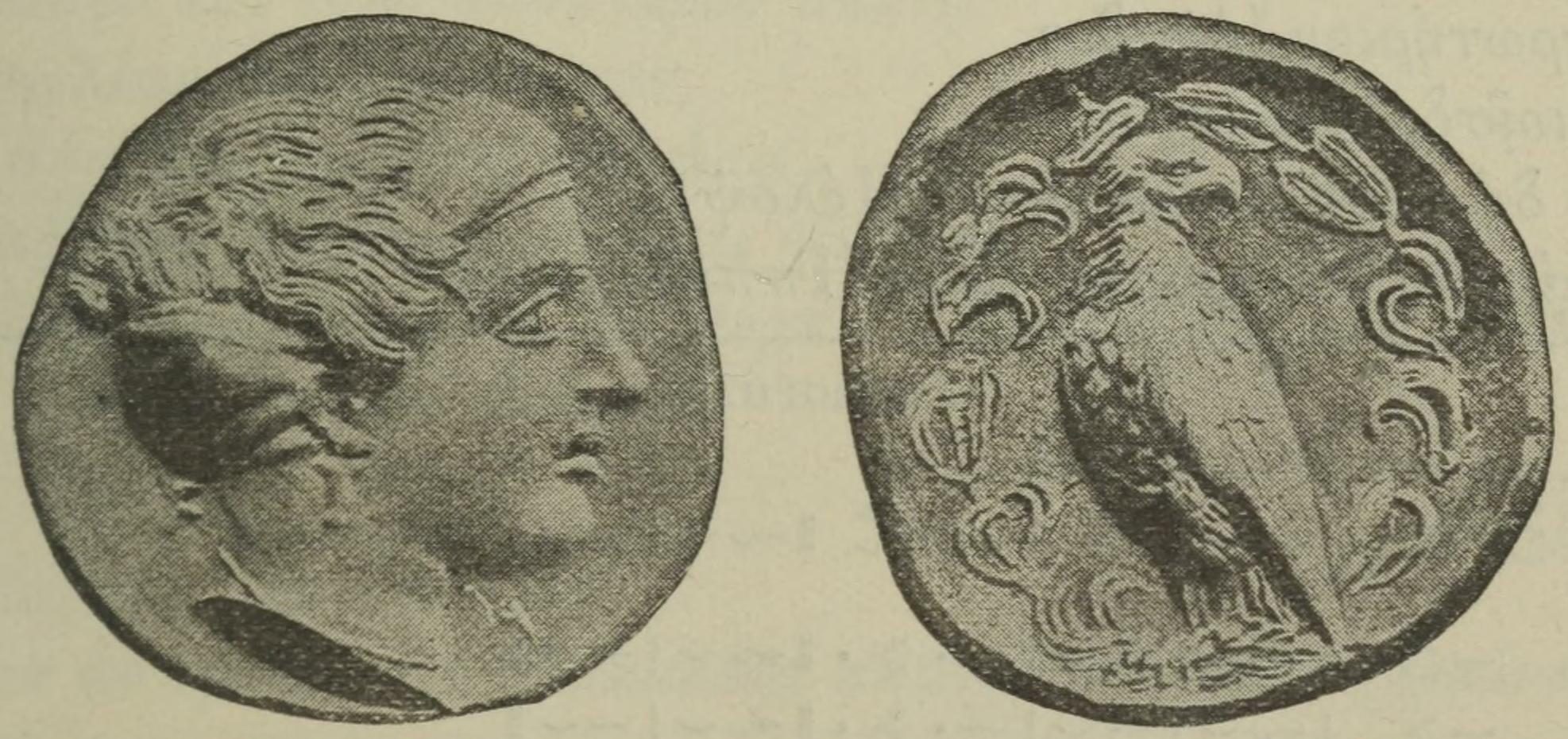
Coin of Elis. Nymph Olympia (obv.) Eagle in wreath (rev.)

Olympia is invoked as the "queen of truth", by reason of the happy issue of the answer given to the competitor by the diviners at the altar of Zeus (1–11). Such happy issues do not come to all alike, (12–14); the victor's brother has been victorious at Nemea, and the victor himself at Olympia (15–18), thus bringing glory to Aegina, an island famed for its devotion to law and order and commerce, under Dorian rule, since the days of Aeacus (19–30).

Myth of the building of the walls of Troy by Apollo, Poseidon, and Aeacus (31–52).

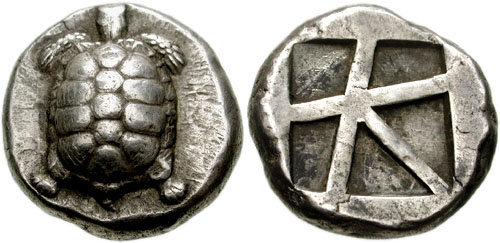
Stater of Aegina, c. 456/45–431 BC. Land tortoise (obv.) Incuse skew pattern (rev.)

Praise of the trainer, Melesias of Athens (53–66). The victor's triumph will rejoice the heart of his grandfather (67–73); six victories have already been won by the family (74–76). The message sending news of this victory will reach his father and his uncle in the other world (77–84). May Zeus grant to the family and to the island health and harmony and an untroubled life (84–88).

== Aftermath ==
The victory belongs to 460 BC. In the following year Aegina, the island of the boy-wrestler, Alcimedon, was defeated at sea; and, in 456, disarmed, dismantled, and rendered tributary by Athens, the city of the boy's trainer, Melesias.

== Sources ==
Attribution:

- Sandys, John, ed. (1915). The Odes of Pindar, including the Principal Fragments. Loeb Classical Library. New York: The Macmillan Co. pp. 82–93.
