= Horst Hahne =

Australian sculptor, medallist, engraver and designer

Horst Hahne PSM (born 1940 in Frankfurt am Main, Hesse, Nazi Germany), is a German-born Australian sculptor, medallist, engraver and designer.

== Life ==
He started school after World War II, and got his school certificate in 1955. He began his apprenticeship in typographic art & hand engraving in the same year at Ludwig & Mayer, an old established German type foundry in Frankfurt am Main. He also did part-time studies of typographic design. After finishing his apprenticeship as a hand engraver in 1958 Horst Hahne migrated to Australia in 1959.

From 1959 to 1965, he lived in Adelaide. In 1965, Hahne moved to Canberra, to work in the Australian Public Service at the Royal Australian Mint, as a hand-engraver of coin and medal dies. From 1975 to 1983 he studied part-time figure & portrait drawing at the Canberra School of Art.

In 1996, he received the Public Service Medal, a civil decoration awarded to Australian public servants for outstanding service.

After his retirement in 1998, Horst Hahne PSM continues to live in Canberra.

== Work ==
- 1959 to 1965: Hand engraver in die stamping and die sinking at Griffin Press, subsidiary of the Advertiser Newspaper Ltd, Adelaide, S.A.
- 1965 to 1998: Commonwealth Public Service at the Royal Australian Mint in Canberra: 1965 hand engraver of coinage and medal dies. 1969 mint craftsman IV. 1979 Chief Engraver. 1987 Director of Design & Engraving. During his long career at the Royal Australian Mint Horst Hahne designed, and/or engraved a long list of Australian, and South Pacific coins, medals, and medallions.
- 1 July 1998: Retired Director of Design & Engraving at the Royal Australian Mint Canberra ACT.
