= Frédéric-Charles-Victor de Vernon =

French artist

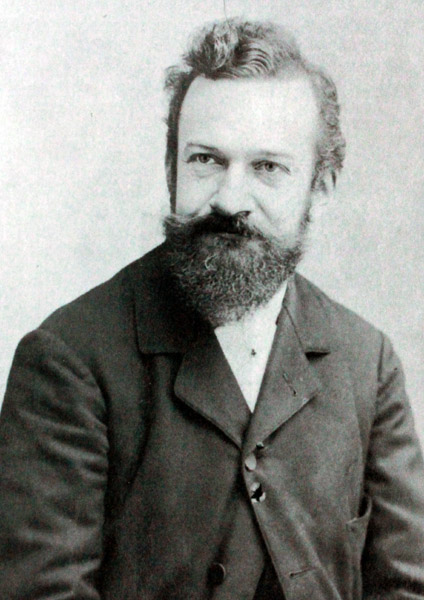
Frédéric-Charles Victor de Vernon (date unknown)

Frédéric-Charles Victor de Vernon (17 November 1858 in Paris – 28 October 1912 in Paris), was a sculptor and engraver of French medals.

== Biography ==
He was educated at the École des beaux-arts where his teachers were Jules Cavelier, Jules-Clément Chaplain, and Émile Tasset.

In 1881, he won second great Prix de Rome and in 1887 the first grand prix of Rome, after which he spent three years at the villa Médicis.

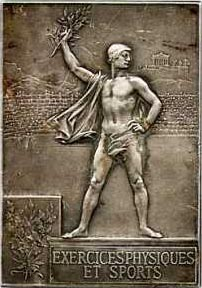
A silvered bronze medal from the 1900 Summer Olympics

In 1900, he designed the official medals for the 1900 Summer Olympics held in Paris. These medals are unique in being the only Olympic medals to be rectangular rather than the traditional circular design. Member of the Société des artistes français since 1896, he was elected member of the Académie des beaux-arts in 1909.

== Bibliography ==
- E. Bénézit, Dictionnaire des peintres, sculpteurs, dessinateurs et graveurs. 1976. Tome 10, page 469.
