= Große Deutsche Kunstausstellung =

Series of art exhibitions

The Große Deutsche Kunstausstellung (Great German Art Exhibition) was held a total of eight times from 1937 to 1944 in the purpose-built Haus der Deutschen Kunst in Munich. It was representative of art under Nazism.

== History ==
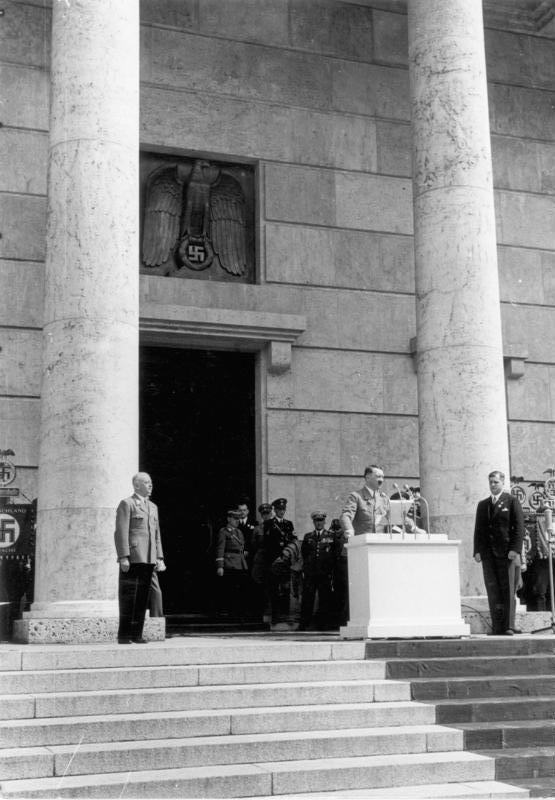
Adolf Hitler during his speech at the opening of the 1st Great German Art Exhibition 1937

The Great German Art Exhibition, which spanned the first floor, the upper floor and the two-story "Hall of Honour" in the centre of the building, was promoted as the most important cultural event in Nazi Germany. The show was conceived as a sales exhibition; artists could be represented with several works (usually up to ten works), and sometimes non-saleable works, such as loans, were also exhibited. During each exhibition, a "special show" gave a selected artist the opportunity to present himself more comprehensively.

While the organizational and technical part of the exhibition preparation was the responsibility of the "Haus der Deutschen Kunst (Neuer Glaspalast)" as an institution under public law, the overall artistic direction was in the hands of a "Commissioner of the President of the Reichskammer of Fine Arts" appointed by Adolf Hitler, his photographer Heinrich Hoffmann. Hoffmann had replaced Gerdy Troost, who resigned after Hitler vetoed her original selections.

The duration of the exhibitions was fixed from the beginning until 1940; the later exhibitions were announced "until further notice". The exhibitions were open daily – including Sundays and holidays – from 9 am to 6 pm. Works sold during the exhibition could be replaced by others "found to be in good condition when the works were examined". The Haus der Deutschen Kunst was the sole contracting party in the sale. Photographing and copying of exhibited works was initially not permitted during exhibition hours, but from 1943, was possible for press purposes with the prior consent of exhibition management.

The exhibition was ceremonially opened on July 18, 1937, together with the House of German Art building. In the opening speech, Hitler gave a comprehensive presentation of the Nazi understanding of German art, which would be the only art permitted in public in the future. In doing so, Hitler outlined, according to Stefan Schweizer, a fundamental, völkisch-racist structure of historical and art historical ideas and interpretations. With his idea that art was a direct expression of the circumstances of the time that shaped it, he identified the art of the Weimar Republic with the political system of the time. The art he valued, on the other hand, he saw as legitimized by politics and at the same time as legitimizing politics. He defined the new German art stylistically as well as ideologically with the words, "'To be German is to be clear.' But that would mean that to be German is to be logical and, above all, true."

In contrast, Hitler defamed "modern art," which was "degenerate", and announced:

From now on, we will wage a relentless war of purification against the last elements of our cultural decay. But if there is one among them who still believes that he is destined for higher things, then he has now had four years to prove this probation, but these four years are also enough for us to come to a final judgment. But now - I want to assure you here - all the mutually supporting cliques of gossips, dilettantes and art cheats will be rooted out and eliminated. As far as we are concerned, these prehistoric cultural Stone Agers and art dabblers may return to the caves of their ancestors, to make their primitive international scribblings there.

— Adolf Hitler, Rede zur Eröffnung der Großen Deutschen Kunstausstellung in München, 18. Juli 1937.

As an example of the now ostracized art, the "Degenerate Art" exhibition in Munich's Hofgarten began one day later. The "Great German Art Exhibition" showed a total of 12,550 exhibits and was visited by around 600,000 people. Art for 13 million Reichsmarks was sold; Hitler alone bought works for 6.8 million Reichsmarks. International interest remained low.

After 1945, numerous works were no longer shown and were also no longer reproduced. The Zentralinstitut für Kunstgeschichte München - in cooperation with the Haus der Kunst, Munich and the Deutsches Historisches Museum, Berlin - has been making them accessible online since October 2011 to facilitate a social and art historical debate. Parallel to the online project, a complete directory of the artists of the Great German Art Exhibition from 1937 to 1944 was published by Neuhaus Verlag in Berlin.

Procession for the opening on 18 July 1937
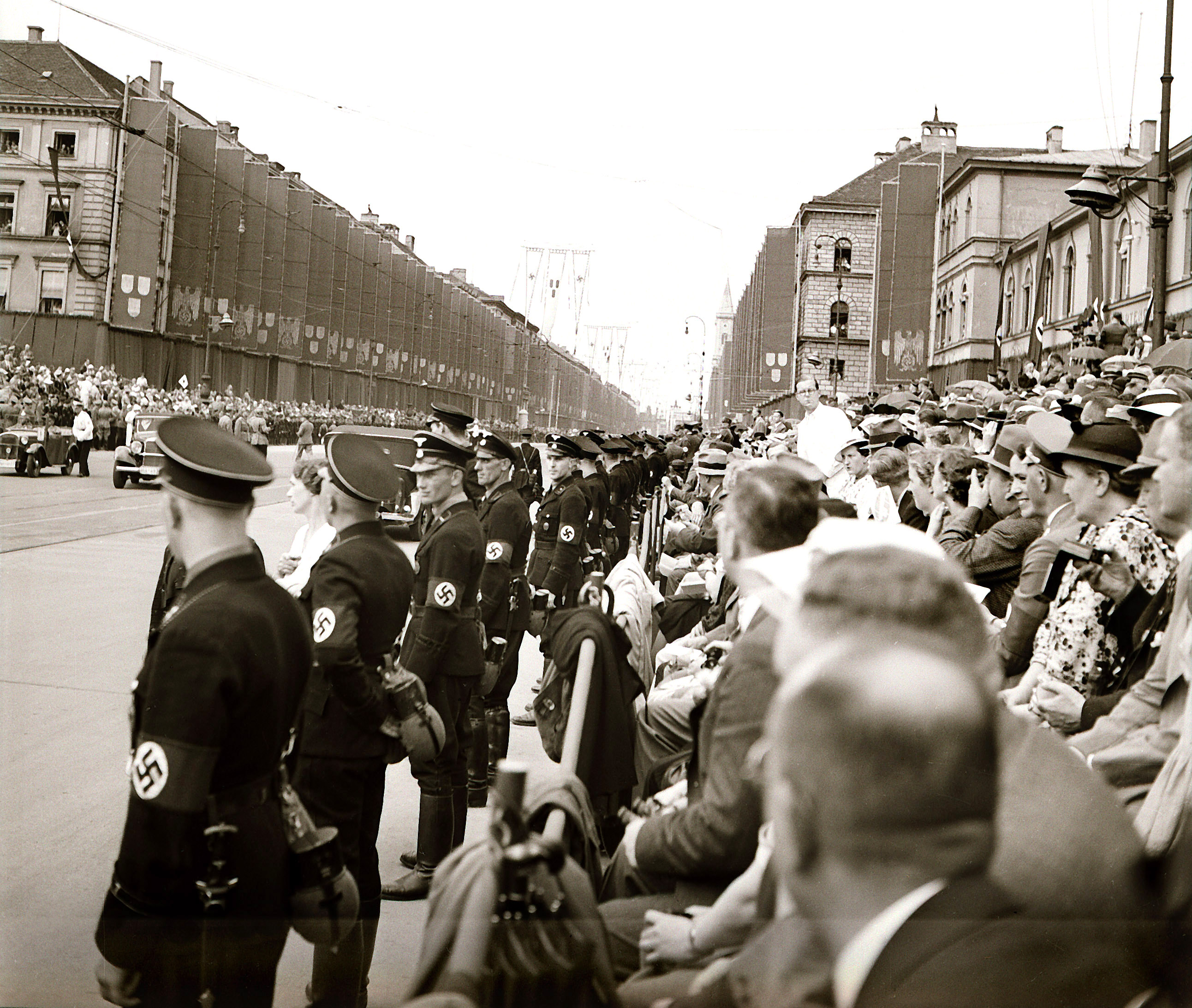

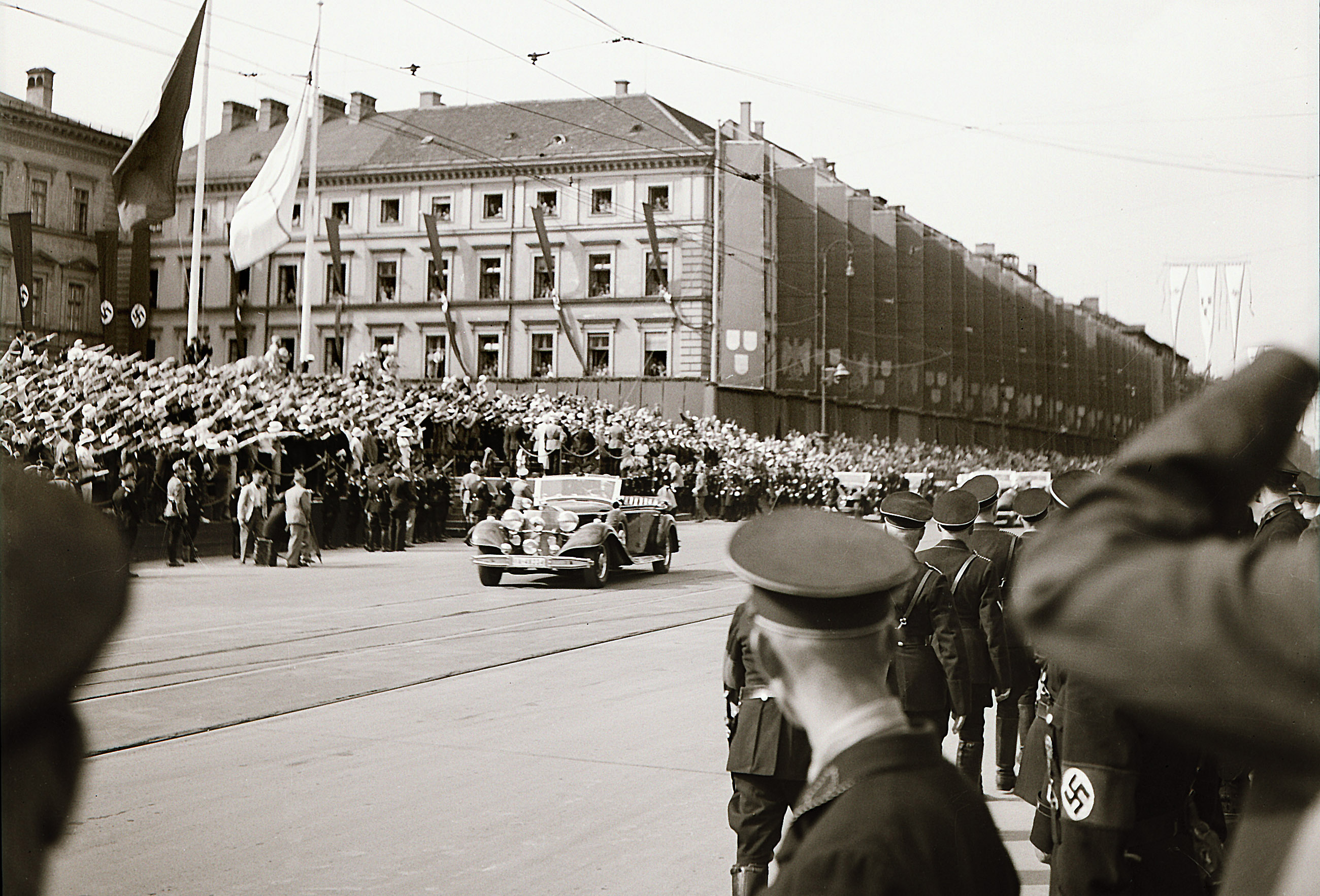
The photo series was taken from a grandstand at Odeonsplatz (east side), diagonally opposite the "Führer-Tribüne" (seen here)

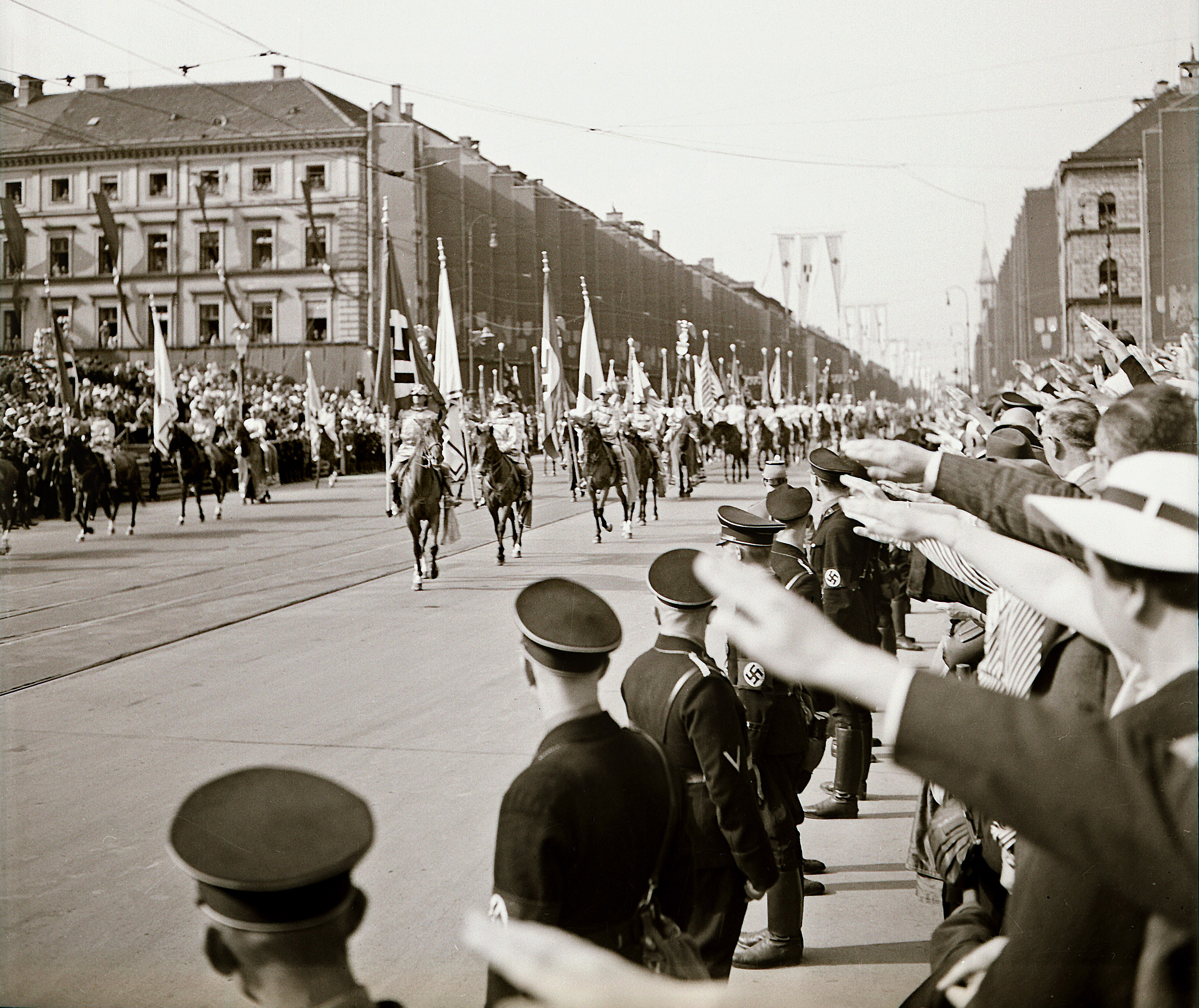
Flag bearers rode at the head of a 3 km long procession.

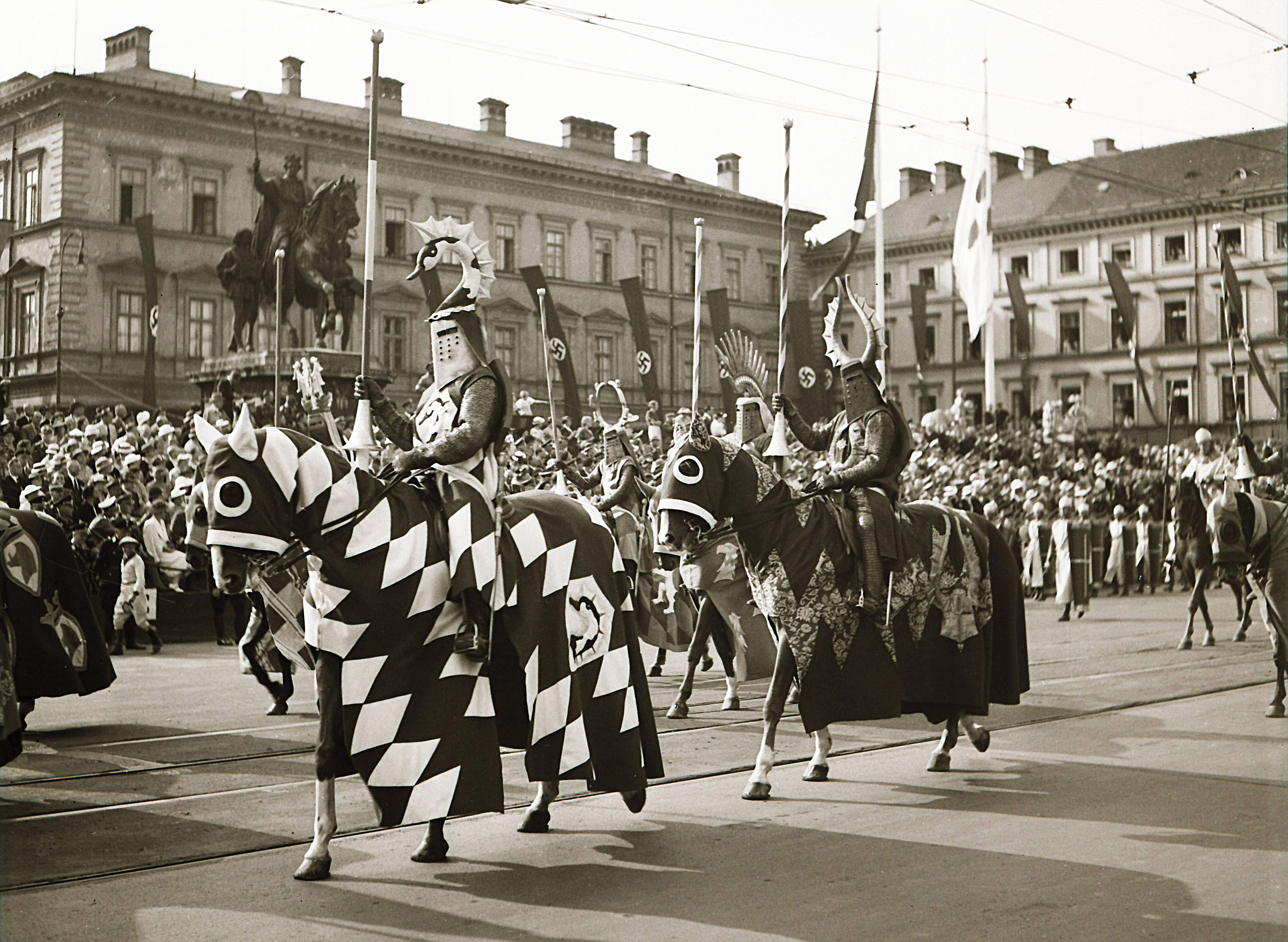
Es wirkten mit 26 Wagen, 5000 Kostüme, 450 Reiter

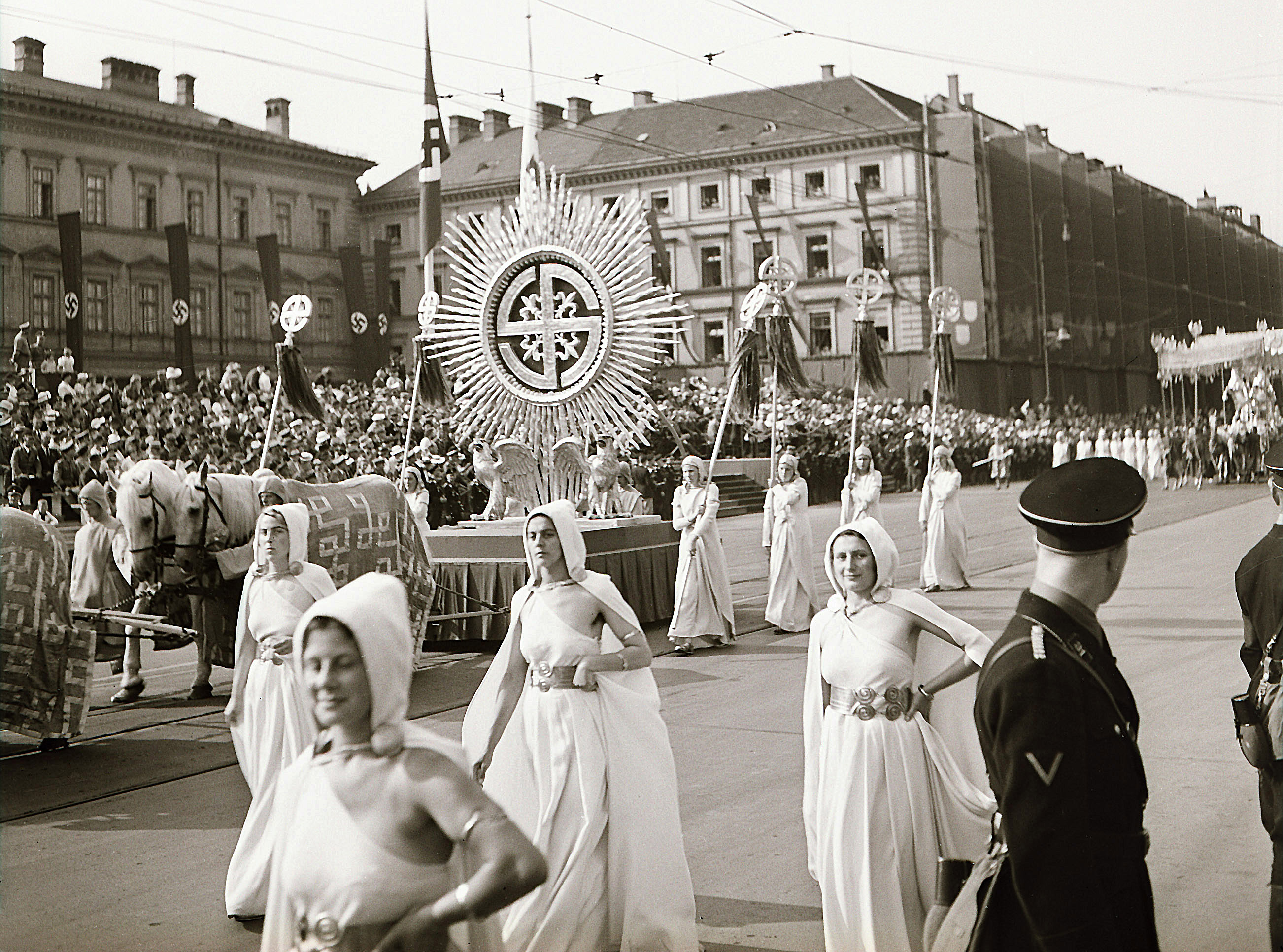
Gezeigt wurde ein Bilderbogen von der germanischen Zeit über Römerzeit, Gotik, Renaissance, Barock, Rokoko bis zur Neuzeit.

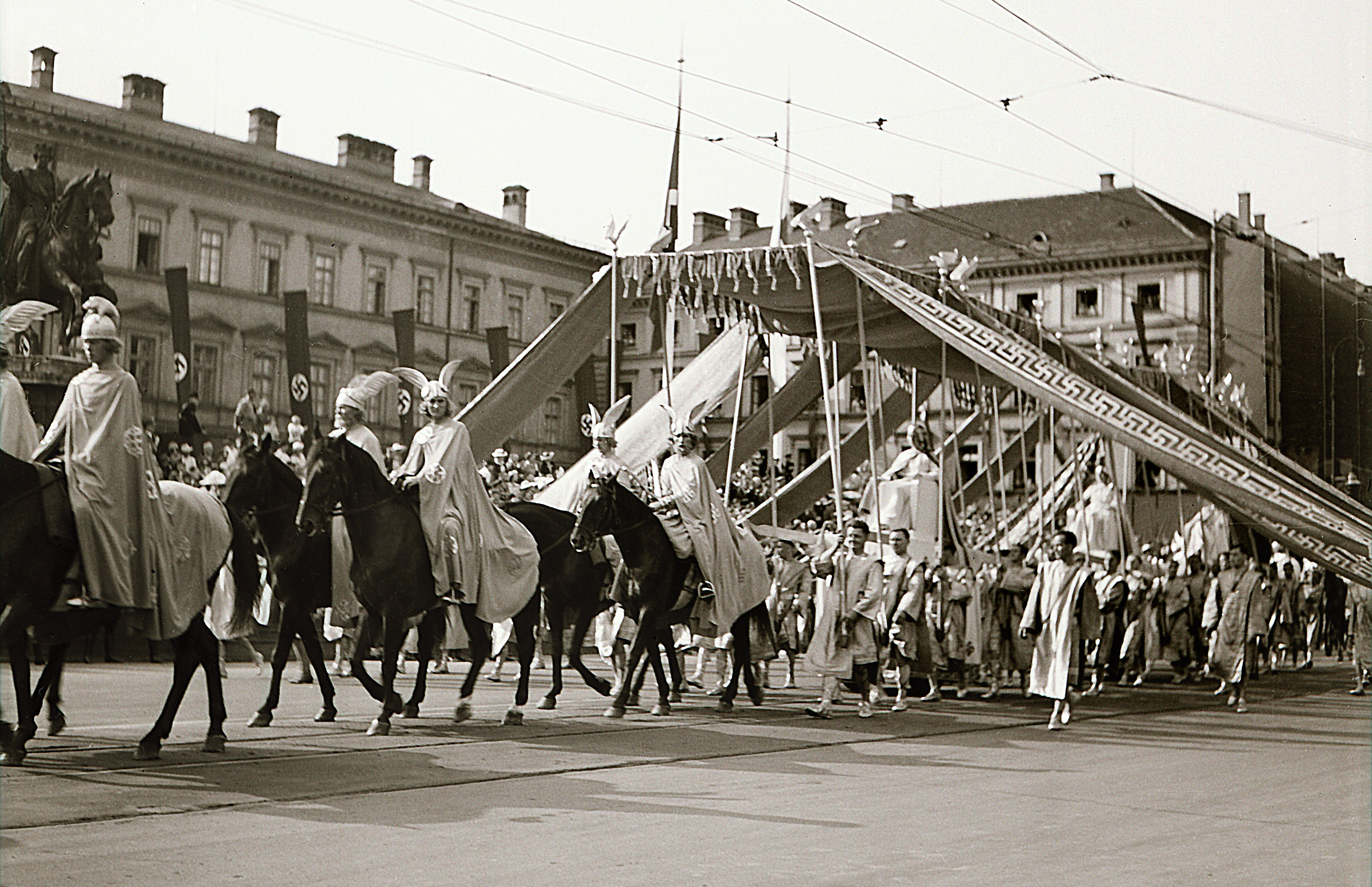
There were 26 wagons, 5000 costumes, 450 riders.

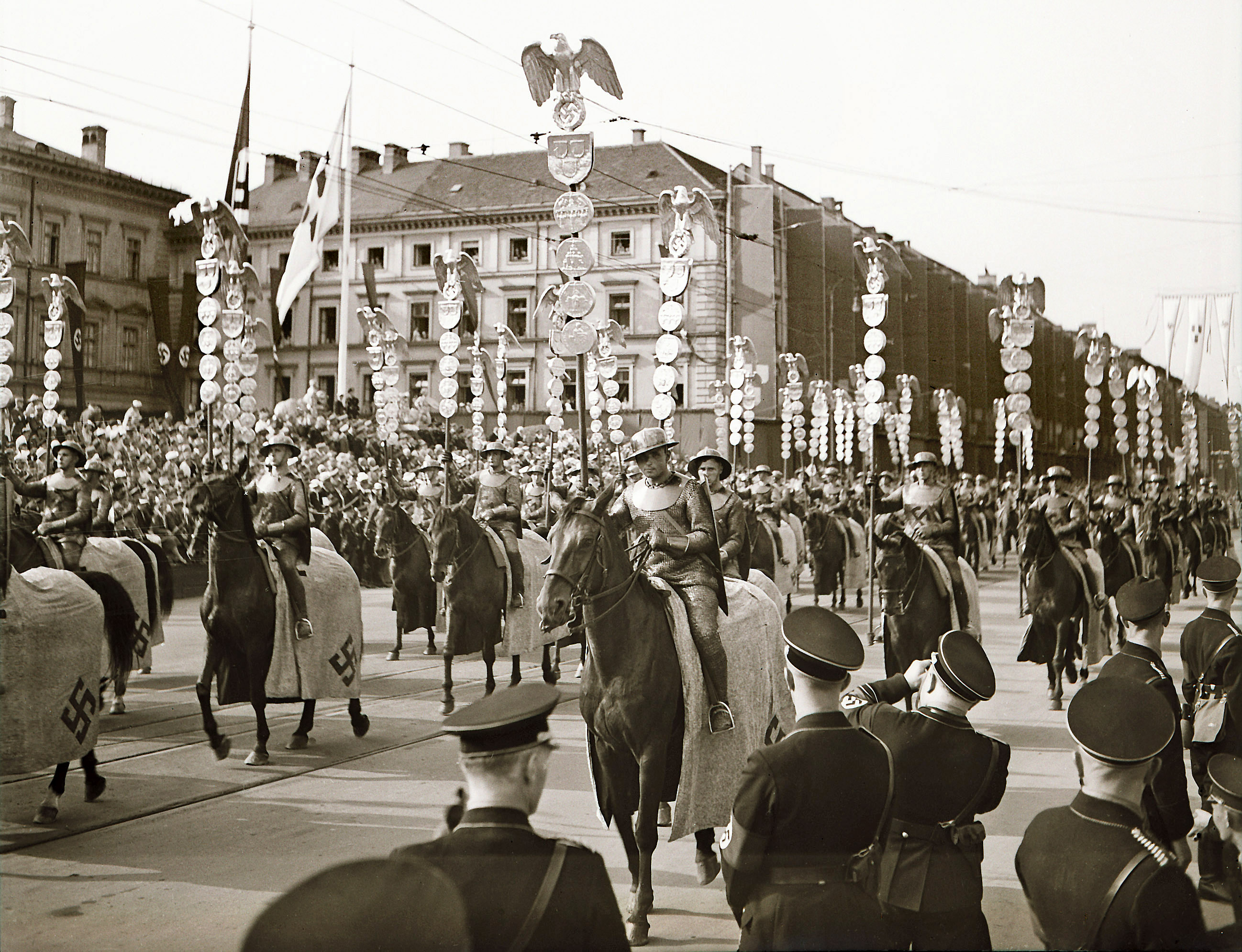

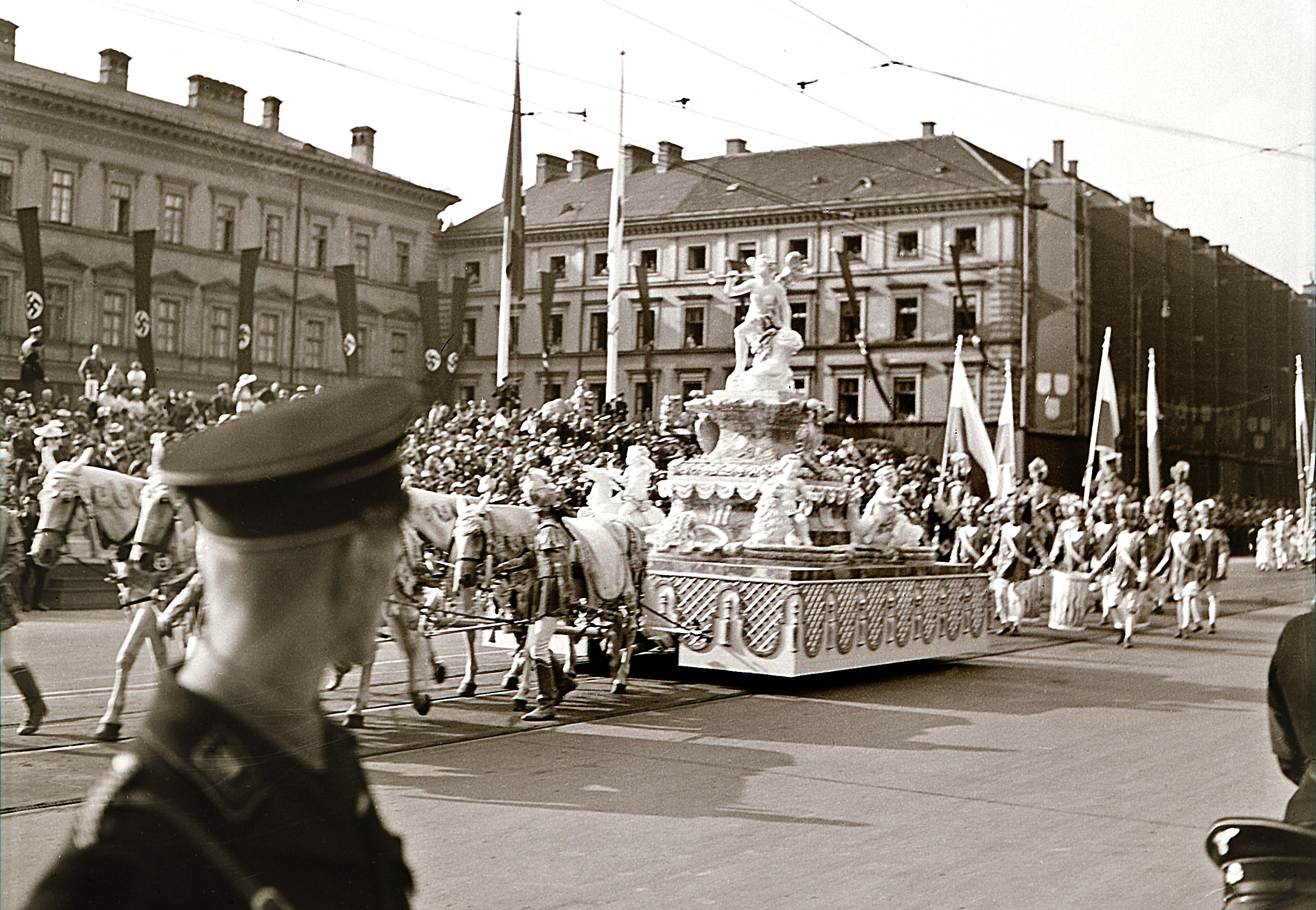

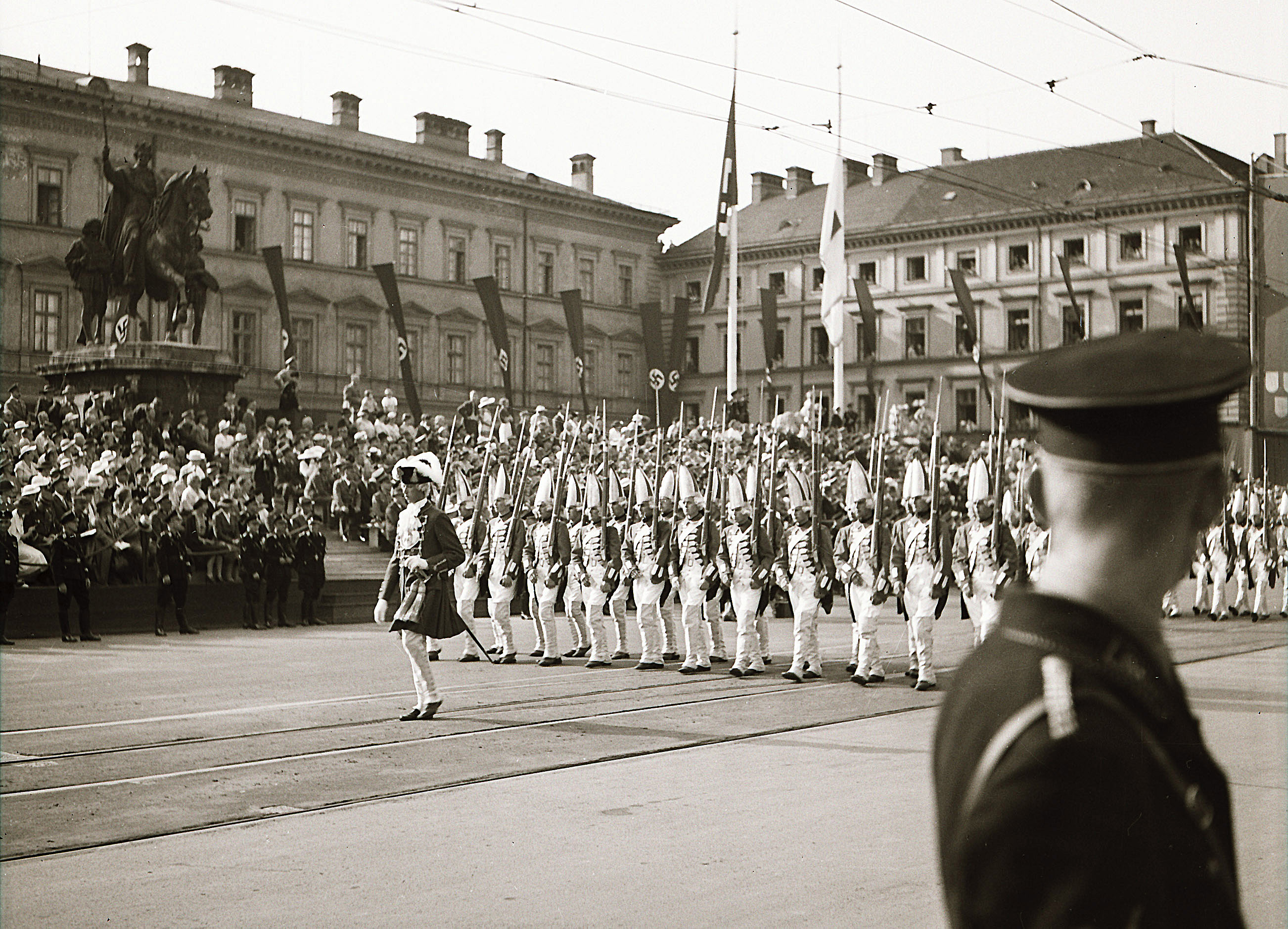

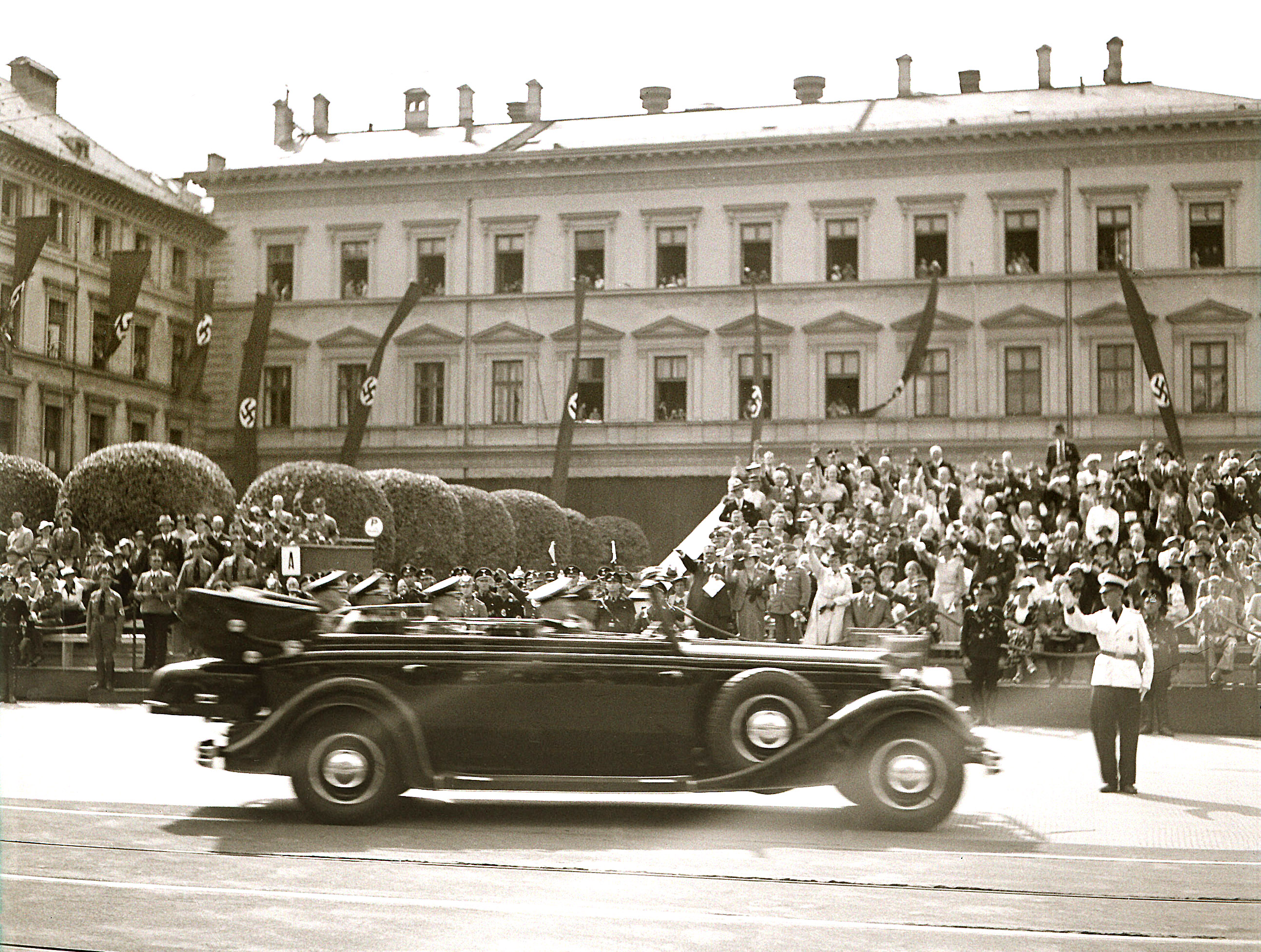
The parade was a highlight of the Day of German Art.

== Exhibitions ==
- 1937: First editions from July 18 to October 31. Opening within the framework of a Day of German Art with a festive program from July 16 to 18, including a large procession 2000 Years of German Culture". Simultaneous opening of the new House of German Art. Opening speech by Adolf Hitler.
- 1938: Second edition from July 10 to October 16. 1158 works of art. Special exhibition of 21 works by Werner Peiner, Kronenburg. May 21 to June 26, 1938: Special exhibition Small Collections, Painting - Sculpture - Prints.
- 1939: Third edition from July 16 to October 15. Opening in the framework of a two-day Day of German Art.
- 1940: Fourth edition from July 27. 1397 works by 752 artists. Opening by the Minister of Propaganda, Joseph Goebbels. In mid-October 1940, the sold works were exchanged for 317 additional selected works. The exhibition was to remain open until February 1941. Special show of 35 works by Friedrich Stahl, Rome.
- 1941: Fifth edition from July 26. Duration: "Until further notice". 1347 works by 647 artists. Opening by Goebbels. Special exhibition of 27 works by Raffael Schuster-Woldan, Berlin.
- 1942: Sixth edition from July 4. Duration: "Until further notice". 1213 works by 680 artists. Opening by Goebbels. Special show of 22 works by Karl Leipold, Berlin.
- 1943: Seventh edition from 26 June. Duration: "Until further notice". 1141 works by 660 artists. Opening by Goebbels. Special show of 35 works by Peter Philippi, Rothenburg ob der Tauber.
- 1944: Eighth edition from July. Duration: "Until further notice". Special show of 21 works by Hugo Gugg, Weimar.

== Exhibiting artists (selection) ==
=== Painting and printmaking ===
- Richard Albitz (1942, 1943)
- Erhard Astler (1939, 1940, 1944)
- Thomas Baumgartner
- Claus Bergen
- Max Bergmann
- Alexander Bertrand (1937)
- Wilhelm Brandenberg (1938, 1941–1943)
- Lothar-Günther Buchheim (1941–1943)
- Paul Beuttner (1944)
- Carl Cohnen (1939, 1943–1944)
- Reinhold Dieffenbacher (1941, 1942)
- Hermann Dietze (1937–1944)
- Otto Diez
- Elk Eber
- Franz Eichhorst
- Otto Engelhardt-Kyffhäuser (1940)
- Fritz Erler
- Erich Feyerabend (1937–1944)
- Alfred Finsterer
- Peter Foerster
- Franz Frankl (1937, 1938)
- Karl Gatermann der Ältere (1938, 1942)
- Constantin Gerhardinger
- Franz Sales Gebhardt-Westerbuchberg
- Franz Gerwin
- Hermann Gradl
- Oskar Graf
- Georg Günther
- Willy Habl
- Anton Hackenbroich (1937, 1939, 1940, 1944)
- Christian Hacker (1937)
- Emilie von Hallavanya (1937,1938,1941–1944)
- Willy Hanft
- Karl Hanusch (1938)
- Paul Adolf Hauptmann
- Otto Hederich (1938)
- Walter Hemming
- Wilhelm Hempfing
- Josef Hengge (1941–1944)
- Sepp Hilz
- Conrad Hommel
- Curt Hoppe-Camphausen (1943)
- Carl Horn
- Hermann Otto Hoyer
- Arthur Illies (1941–1944)
- Angelo Jank
- Karl Julius Joest (1941–1943)
- Julius Paul Junghanns
- Arthur Kampf (1939)
- Herbert Kampf (1939–1943)
- Hermann Kaspar
- Josef Katzola (1938)
- Josef Woldemar Keller-Kühne
- Franz Kienmayer (1937)
- Erich Kips
- Otto Kirchner
- Richard Klein
- Walther Klemm (1937–1944)
- Johann Kluska (1941)
- Heinrich Knirr
- Fred Kocks (1942, 1943)
- Leo Küppers (1942)
- Anton Kürmaier (1937–1943)
- Georg Sluyterman von Langeweyde (1939, 1940)
- Hubert Lanzinger
- Jan Laß (1942)
- Karl Lenz (1937–1942)
- Rudolf Lipus
- Georg Lebrecht
- Hans Jacob Mann
- Oskar Martin-Amorbach
- Hermann Mayrhofer-Passau (1937–1944)
- Erich Mercker
- Herbert Molwitz (1937–1944)
- Bernhard Müller
- Hans Müller-Schnuttenbach
- Oskar Mulley
- Willy Mulot (1938)
- Oskar Nerlinger
- Leo Nyssen (1941)
- Adolf Obst (1941)
- Paul Mathias Padua
- Willy Paupie
- Alfons Peerboom (1939, 1940)
- Werner Peiner
- Conrad Pfau
- Peter Philippi
- Meta Plückebaum (1939)
- Leo Poeten (1943)
- Hans von Poschinger
- Carl Theodor Protzen
- Erwin Puchinger
- Robert Pudlich
- Albert Reich (1938, 1939, 1942)
- August Rixen (1937, 1941–1944)
- Karl Rössing (1939, 1940)
- Paul Roloff (1937)
- Toni Roth (1937–1943)
- Ivo Saliger
- Leo Samberger
- Wilhelm Sauter
- Ferdinand Schebek (1939, 1940)
- Leopold Schmutzler
- Toni Schönecker (1940)
- Wilhelm Schmidthild
- Hans Schmitz-Wiedenbrück
- Josef Schröder-Schoenenberg
- Raffael Schuster-Woldan
- Richard Schwarzkopf (1937)
- Georg Siebert
- Felix Skoda (1943)
- Albert Spethmann (1942)
- Hans Spiegel (1939, 1944)
- Ferdinand Spiegel
- Blasius Spreng (1942)
- Franz Xaver Stahl
- Josef Steiner (1941, 1942)
- Karl Storch
- Otto Thämer
- Hermann Tiebert
- Willy Tiedjen (1937, 1938, 1940)
- Hans Toepper (1937, 1939, 1940)
- Franz Triebsch
- Will Tschech (1939, 1942)
- Ernst Unbehauen (1943)
- Franz Xaver Unterseher (1937, 1940–1942)
- Josef Wahl (1937–1943)
- Karl Walther
- Franz Weiß (1939, 1940, 1942–1944)
- Rudolf G. Werner
- Paul Westerfrölke
- Erwin Wilking (1942, 1943)
- Wolfgang Willrich
- Otto Winkelsträter
- Adolf Wissel
- Ludwig Wollenheit (1943, 1944)
- Adolf Ziegler
- Bodo Zimmermann

=== Sculpture ===
- Fritz Behn
- Rudolf Belling (1937)
- August Bischoff
- Bernhard Bleeker
- Hermann Brachert
- Arno Breker
- Lothar Dietz
- Max Esser
- Fritz von Graevenitz (1937, 1940–1943)
- Theobald Hauck (1938)
- G. Adh. Hedblom
- Karl Hoefelmayr (1939)
- Artur von Hüls
- Carl Paul Jennewein (1937, 1938, 1939)
- Barbara von Kalckreuth
- Lilli Kerzinger-Werth (1937, 1938, 1940, 1943, 1944)
- Fritz Klimsch
- Fritz Koelle
- Georg Kolbe
- Wilhelm Krieger
- Walter Kruse (1939, 1940, 1944)
- Leon Lauffs (1938)
- Adolf Lesnick (1937, 1939)
- Ferdinand Liebermann
- Paul Merling (1939, 1940, 1942, 1943)
- Hermann Joachim Pagels
- Clemens Pasch
- Bernhard von Plettenberg
- Charlotte Reischauer
- Ernst Reiß-Schmidt
- Konrad Roth
- Richard Scheibe
- Hans Schwegerle
- Wilhelm Srb-Schloßbauer (1944)
- Milly Steger (1937)
- Carl Stock
- Wilhelm Tank
- Josef Thorak
- Oscar E. Ulmer (1941)
- Hermann Volz
- Josef Wackerle
- Adolf Wamper
- Wilhelm Wandschneider
- Walther Wolff (1939, 1942)
- Rudolf Zieseniss (1941)
- Alfred Zschorsch (1940)
- Walter Zschorsch (1940)

== Bibliography ==
- Große Deutsche Kunstausstellung (Jahresangabe) im Haus der Deutschen Kunst zu München. Offizieller Ausstellungskatalog. Knorr & Hirth / F. Bruckmann KG, München 1937–1944. (Verzeichnis der Kunstwerke und Abbildungsteil; Abbildungen erfolgten in Auswahl). Teilweise erschienen zu den Katalogen Ergänzungsteile mit der Auflistung ausgetauschter Werke.
- Kunst im 3. Reich – Dokumente der Unterwerfung. Frankfurter Kunstverein u. Arbeitsgruppe d. Kunstgeschichtlichen Instituts d. Universität Frankfurt im Auftrag d. Stadt Frankfurt, Frankfurt am Main 1980. (Diesem Taschenbuch liegt ein Ausstellungskatalog zu Grunde.)
- Brantl, Sabine (2007). Haus der Kunst, München. Ein Ort und seine Geschichte im Nationalsozialismus. München: Allitera Verlag. ISBN 978-3-86520-242-0.
- Sabine Brantl: Große Deutsche Kunstausstellungen. 1937–1944. In: Deutschland Archiv (Hrsg.): Drittes Reich. Dokumente. Braunschweig 2010. (Loseblattsammlung).
- Hinkel, Hermann (1975). Zur Funktion des Bildes im deutschen Faschismus. Steinbach (Giessen): Anabas-Verlag. ISBN 3-87038-033-0.
- Hinz, Berthold (1974). Die Malerei im deutschen Faschismus – Kunst und Konterrevolution. München: Hanser. ISBN 3-446-11938-8.
- Schweizer, Stefan (2007). "Unserer Weltanschauung sichtbaren Ausdruck geben". Nationalsozialistische Geschichtsbilder in den historischen Festzügen zum "Tag der Deutschen Kunst" 1933 bis 1939. Göttingen: Wallstein. ISBN 978-3-8353-0107-8.
- Thoms, Robert (2018). Die Künstler der Großen Deutschen Kunstausstellung München 1937-1944 Gesamtverzeichnis : mit einer chronologischen Inhaltsübersicht der Zeitschrift Die Kunst im Deutschen Reich. Berlin: Neuhaus. ISBN 978-3-937294-09-4.
