= Clemens Pasch =

German sculptor and painter (1910–1985)

Clemens Pasch (July 19, 1910, Sevelen – July 12, 1985, in Düsseldorf) was a German sculptor and painter.

== Life ==
1926–1928 After his school years Clemens Pasch did an apprenticeship as a painter in Düsseldorf.

In 1929 worked at the Krefeld City Theatre. There he got his first training in fine arts with the painter Fritz Huhnen.

1930: staying in Amsterdam, working as a graphic artist.

1931: Pasch lived in Paris and worked as a painter decorating the newly built pavilion of the Netherlands at the Colonial Exhibition.

In 1936, Pasch applied as a craftsman in commercial graphics at the Trade Inspectorate in Cologne.

In 1937, he studied at the Academy of Arts in Düsseldorf. Since Edwin Scharff had already been excluded from teaching, Pasch stayed for one term with Joseph Enseling, but then switched over to School for Crafts and Arts of Cologne. In 1947 his flat and workshop were completely destroyed in the war, including all of his works.

In 1942, Pasch went to Munich to study at the Academy of Fine Arts. He became “Master scholar” of professor Bernhard Bleeker.

In 1946, Pasch returned to Düsseldorf where he was active as an independent artist until his death, his workshop being located at the “Atelierhaus” in 5, Sittard Street. In 1949 he married Elfriede Bockamp, a medical doctor. The couple had four children.

In 1952, he gained a scholarship by the Ministry of Culture of the federal state of North Rhine-Westphalia Nordrhein-Westfalen and could stay in Italy. He also travelled to work in Greece and Spain.

In 1953, he received a scholarship by the cultural association “Ars-Viva” of the Federal Association of German Industry (BDI).

Clemens Pasch was a member of several associations such as “Rheinische Sezession”, “Neue Münchener Kunstgenossenschaft”, “Neue Darmstädter Sezession” and “Duisburger Sezession”.

== Exhibitions ==
Personal exhibitions (choice of works):
Bonn, Darmstadt, Kunsthalle Düsseldorf, München, Köln, Krefeld, Stuttgart

Shares in exhibitions (choice of works):
Rheinische Sezession, Große Düsseldorfer Kunstausstellung, Neue Darmstädter Sezesssion, Academy of Arts, Berlin, Große Deutsche Kunstausstellung, Kulturkreis im Bundesverband der Deutschen Industrie (BDI), ars viva, Biennale Antwerpen Middelheimmuseum, Freilichtmuseum Sonsbeek/Niederlande, III. Exposition Internationale du Petit Bronze „Sculpteurs Europeens“ in Madrid/Barcelona, Kunstverein Hannover, Biennale der Ostseeländer Rostock, Krakau. Furthermore, exhibitions curated by Deutschen Kunstrat in Sweden, Finland and Ireland.

Public acquisitions and orders:
Aachen, Bocholt, Castrop-Rauxel, Academy of Arts, Berlin, Bonn, Bad Godesberg, Darmstadt, Dinslaken, Dortmund, Düsseldorf, Duisburg, Frankfurt/Main, Geldern, Gelsenkirchen, Grevenbroich, Kirche Mehlem, Kempen, Krefeld, Nümbrecht, Paris, Recklinghausen, Sevelen (Issum), Siegen, Ulmen, Witten.

Acquisitions by museums:
Niedersächsisches Landesmuseum Hannover, Haus der Kunst München, Kunsthaus Nordrhein-Westfalen Kornelimünster, Royal Museum of Fine Arts Antwerp, The Johnson Galleries Chicago

== Gallery ==
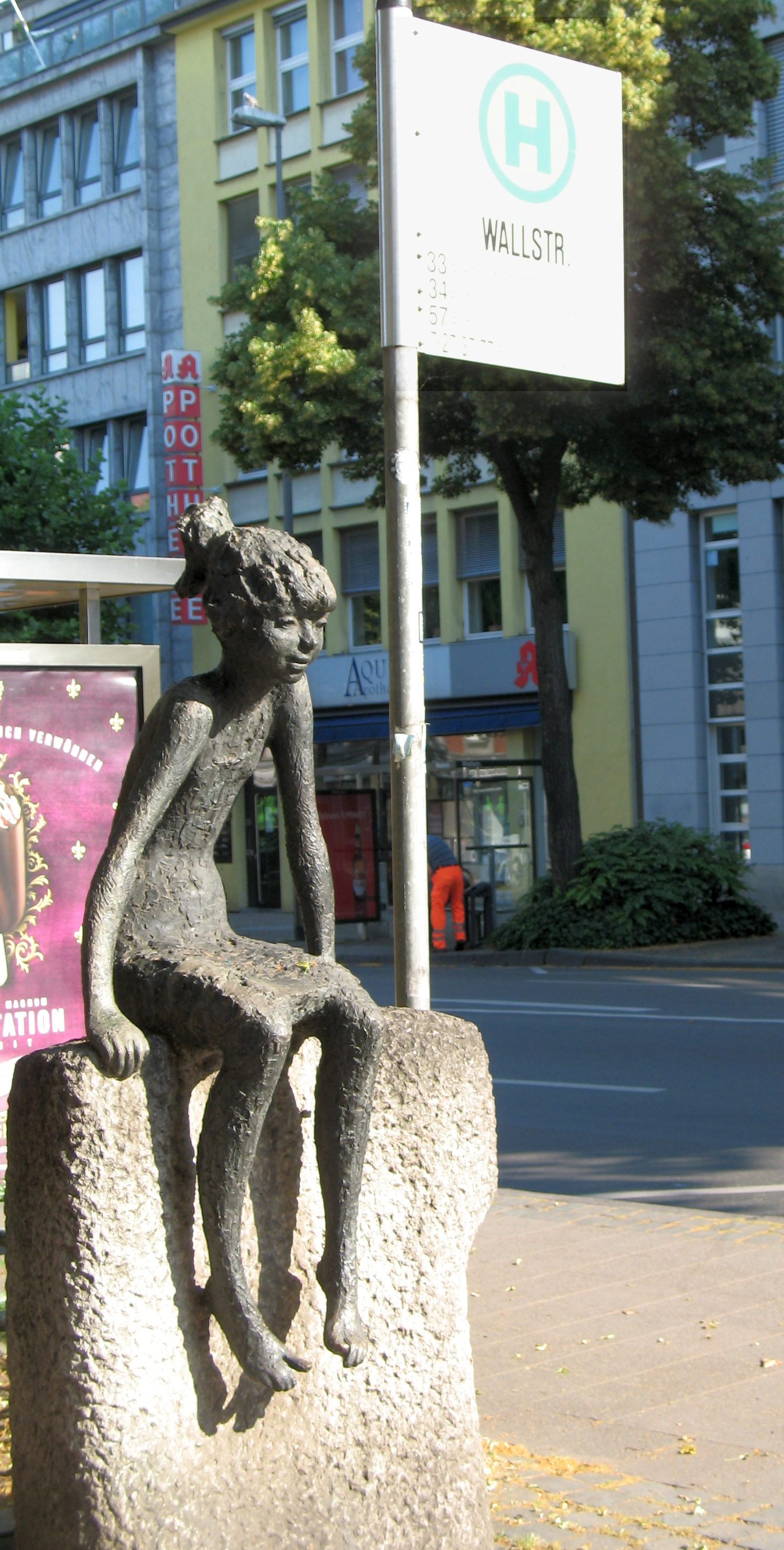
Skulptur in Aachen, 1979

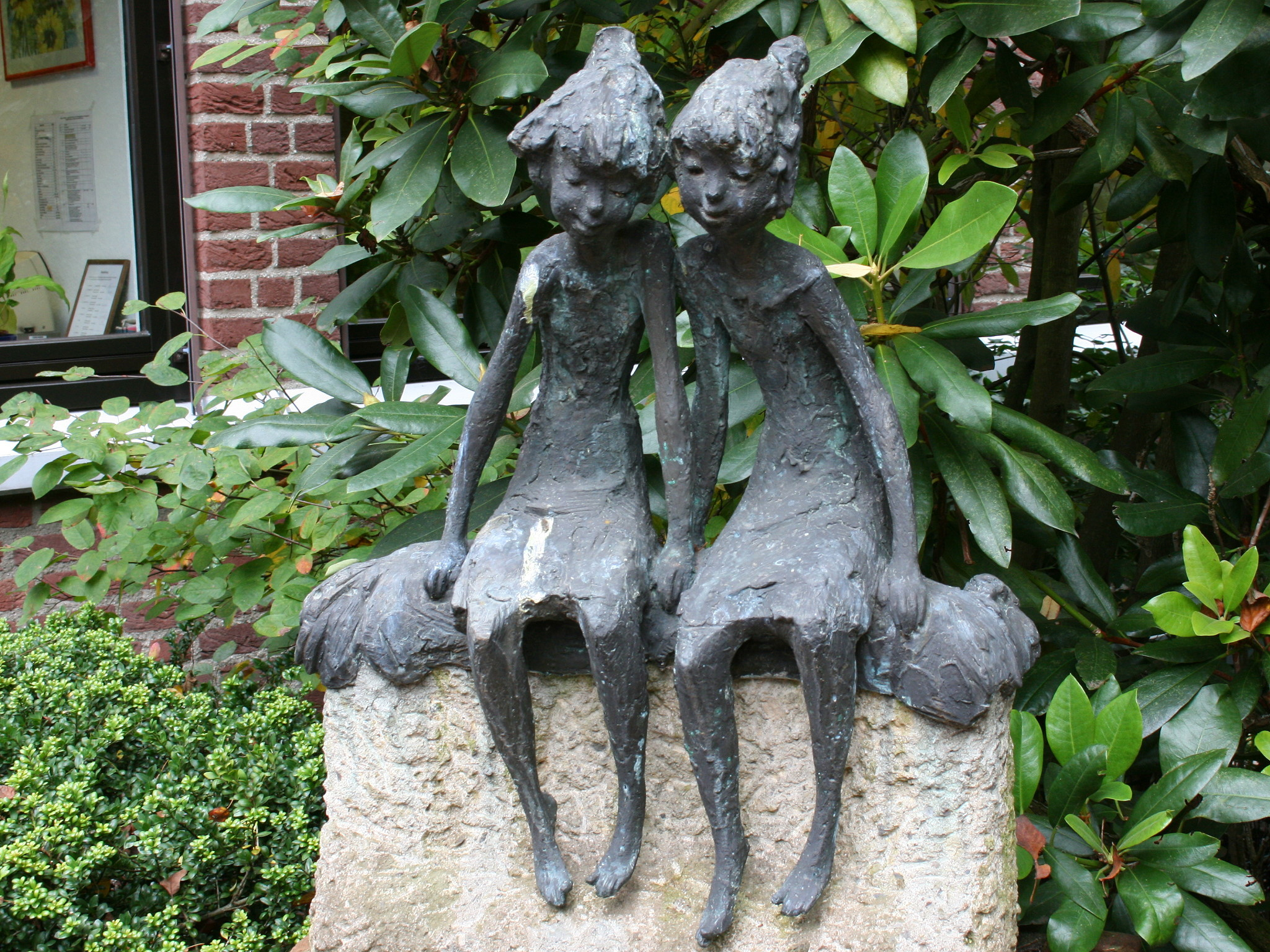
two girls (Zwei Mädchen), Issum

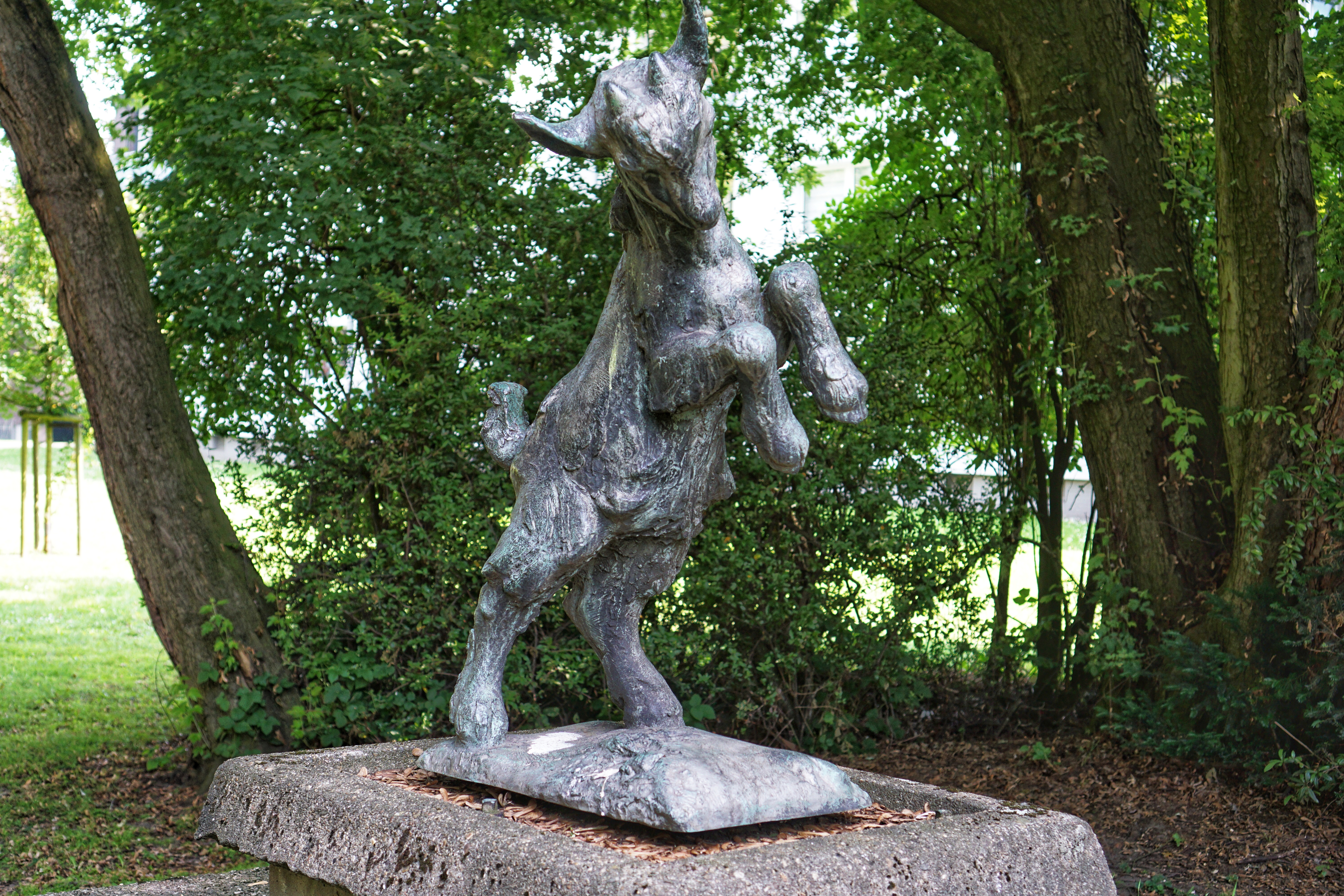
Jumping buck (Springender Bock), Duisburg

== Literature ==
- Exhibition catalog for a solo exhibition in the Kurfürstlichen Gärtnerhaus in Bonn from January 14 to February 19, 1961 (in German)
- Clemens Pasch Zeichnungen, Text Jo Schiffers-Ehlers, Gyuri von Kovats, 1981 (in German)
- Clemens Pasch, Plastiken und Zeichnungen, o.J. Text Gyuri von Kovats (in German)
- Ausstellungskatalog Kunsthaus Bühler, Stuttgart, 1985 (in German)
- Ulrich Gertz: Clemens Pasch. Das Plastische Werk. (in German) Community of heirs Clemens Pasch (self-publishing), Aachen 2009, ISBN 978-3-00-027090-1
- Ergänzung zum Werkverzeichnis, Community of heirs Clemens Pasch, 2020 (in German)
- Galerie Heidefeld: CLEMENS PASCH Die Schönheit der Skulptur. Die Sinnlichkeit der Bilder. Krefeld 2021 (in German)
