= Hans Schmitz (disambiguation) =

Hans Schmitz (1896–1986) was a German politician.

Hans Schmitz may also refer to:

- Hans Schmitz, architect of Nail Men
- Hans Schmitz-Wiedenbrück (1907–1944), a German painter of sacral, peasant and Nazi propaganda arts

== See also ==
- Hans Schmidt (disambiguation)
