= Hans Schmidt =

Hans Schmidt may refer to:

== Military ==
- Hans Schmidt (general, born 1895) (1895–1971), German general in World War II, involved in Battle of the Hurtgen Forest
- Hans Schmidt (general of the Infantry) (1877–1948), German general in World War II
- Hans Schmidt (Waffen-SS) (1927–2010), Waffen-SS man, chairman of the German American National Political Action Committee, self-published author
- Hans-Thilo Schmidt (1888–1943), spy, sold secrets about the Germany's Enigma machine to the French

== Sports ==
- Hans Schmidt (bobsleigh), German bobsledder
- Hans Schmidt (footballer, born 1887) (1887–1916), German international footballer
- Hans Schmidt (footballer, born 1893) (1893–1971), German international footballer and manager
- Hans Schmidt (wrestler) (1925–2012), stage name of Guy Larose, Canadian wrestler
- Hans-Dieter Schmidt (born 1948), German footballer

== Other ==
- Hans Schmidt (architect) (1893–1972), Swiss architect
- Hans Schmidt (musician) (1854–1923), German composer, pianist and poet, close friend of Raimund von zur-Mühlen
- Hans Schmidt (priest) (1881–1916), American Roman Catholic priest executed for committing murder
- Hans Schmidt-Horix (1909–1970), German diplomat, former ambassador to Afghanistan, Iraq and Portugal
- Hans Schmidt-Isserstedt (1900–1973), German conductor and composer
- Hans Christian Schmidt (born 1953), Danish politician
- Hans Werner Schmidt (1859–1950), German painter, illustrator and etcher

== See also ==
- SS Hans Schmidt, German cargo on the list of shipwrecks in January 1943
- Hans Schmitt (1835–1907), pianist and professor at the Vienna Conservatory of the Gesellschaft der Musikfreunde, see List of music students by teacher: R to S
- Hans Schmitz (disambiguation)
