= Otto Kirchner =

Otto Kirchner may refer to:

- Otto Kirchner (painter)
- Otto Kirchner (politician)
- Otto Kirchner (SS officer)
