= Ferdinand Schebek =

Austrian painter

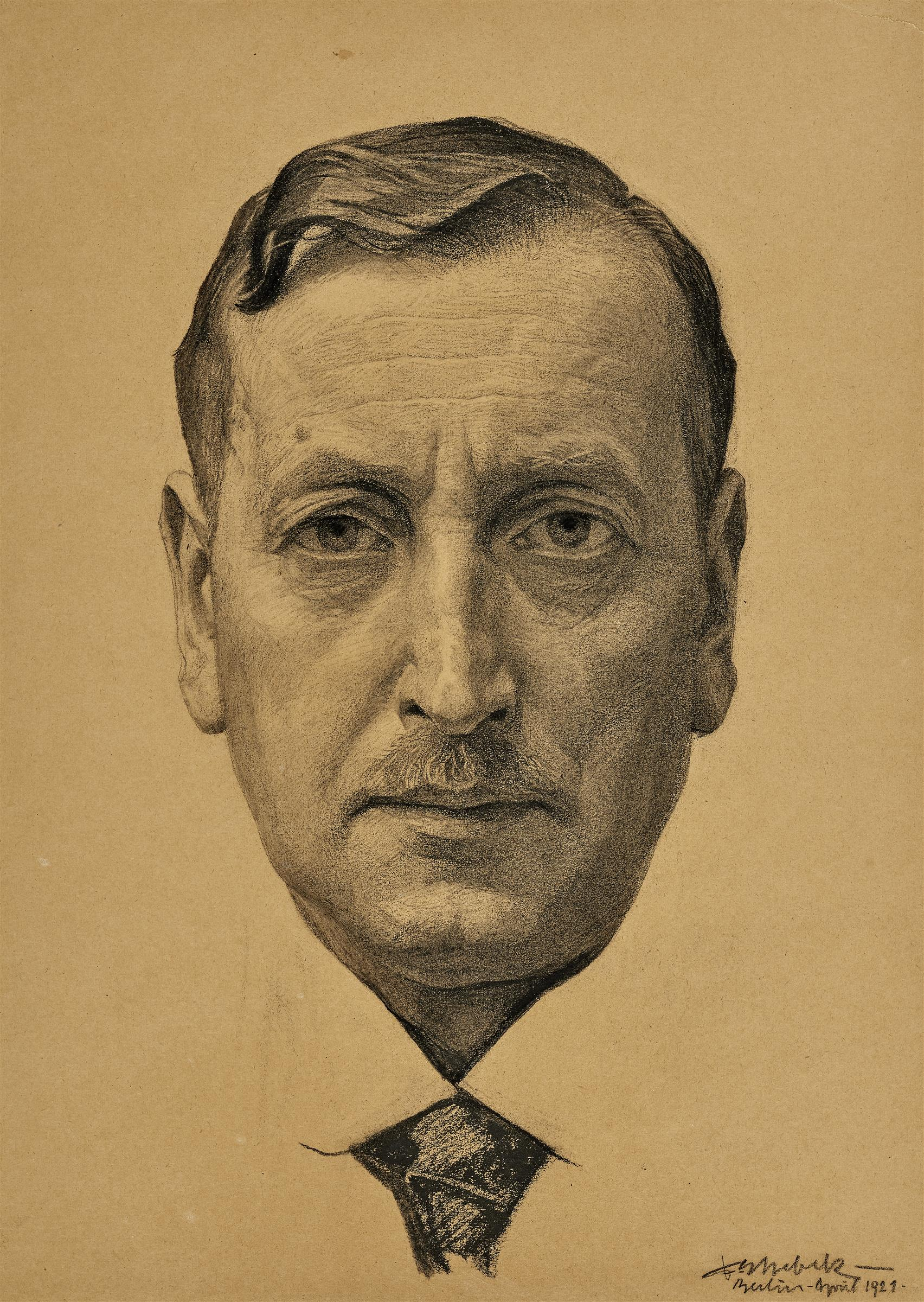
- Self-portrait, 1921, chalk and graphite on paper, Salzburg Museum
- Born: Ferdinand Schebek; 23 February 1875; Vienna, Austria
- Died: 29 October 1949 (aged 74); Vienna, Austria
- Education: Academy of Fine Arts Vienna
- Known for: Painting
- Movement: Realism

Ferdinand Schebek (23 February 1875 – 29 October 1949) was an Austrian painter of the 20th century.

== Biography ==
Schebek was born in Vienna in 1875 and studied at the Academy of Fine Arts Vienna. He lived and worked mainly in Berlin. Schebek was a member of the Reich Association of Fine Artists of Germany and of the General German Art Cooperative.

In 1939 and 1940, a total of four of his works were exhibited at the Great German Art Exhibition held at the House of German Art in Munich.

Year	Title	Type	Cat. no.
1939	Coots at Lake Tegel	Oil painting	983
1940	Leopards	Oil painting	1027
1940	Playing Leopards	Monotype	1028
1940	Brown Bear with Cubs	Monotype	1029

He painted primarily animals, landscapes, genre scenes, and still lifes in a realistic style in both oil and watercolor. His works were sold at public auctions multiple times, including at Dorotheum and Lempertz. He died in Vienna in 1949.

== Gallery ==
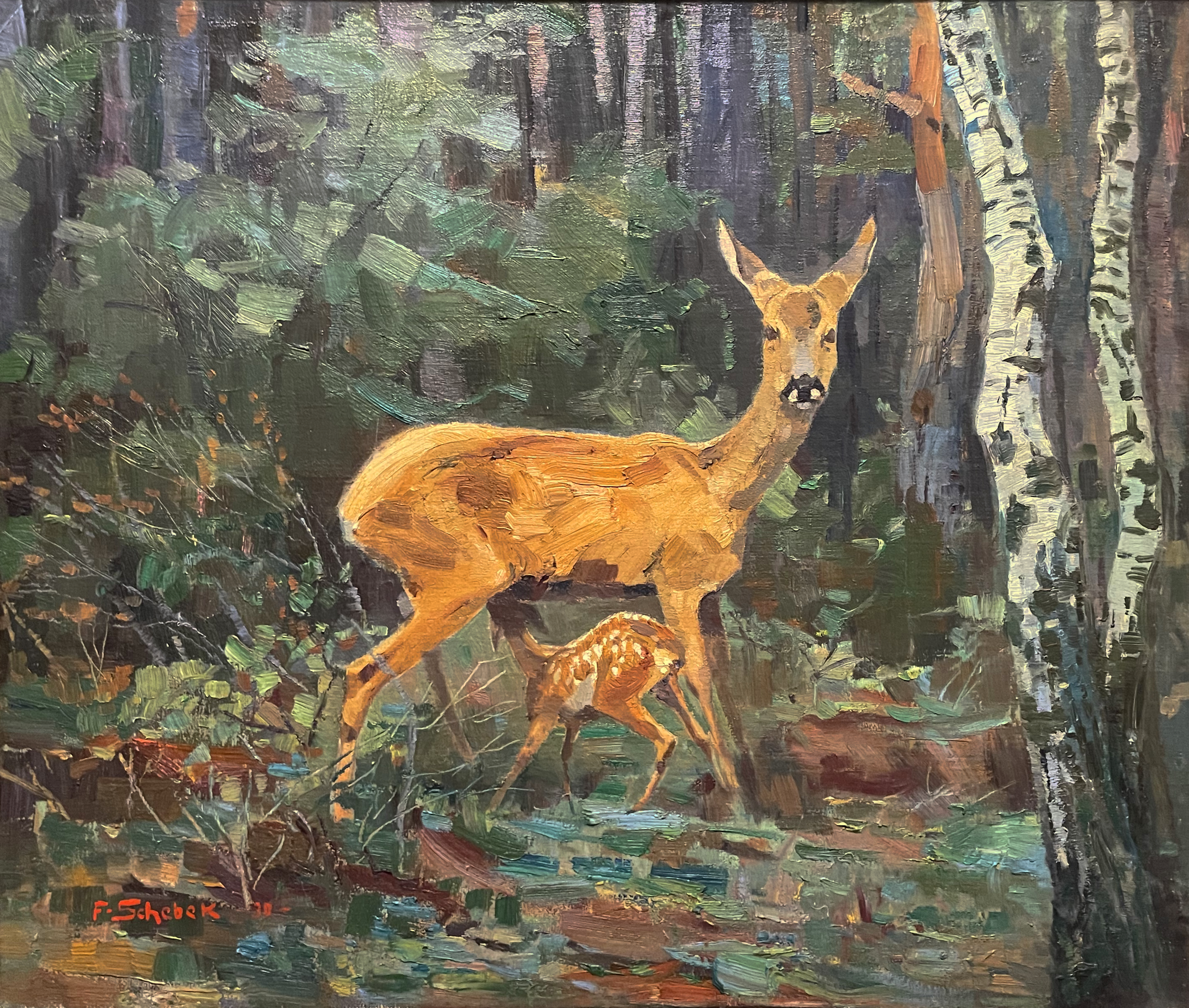
Doe with Fawn in a Clearing, 1930

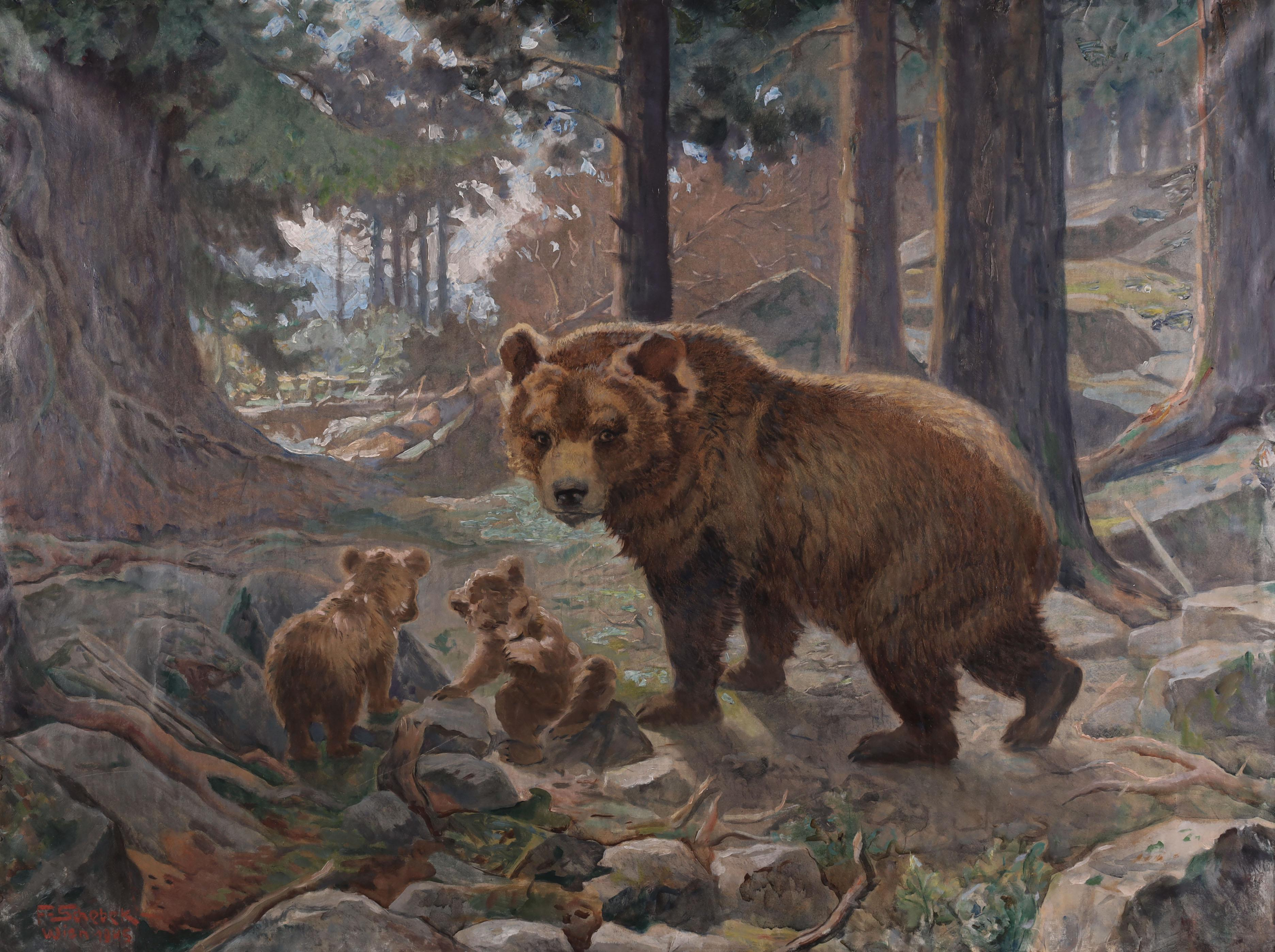
Brown bear with cub, 1945

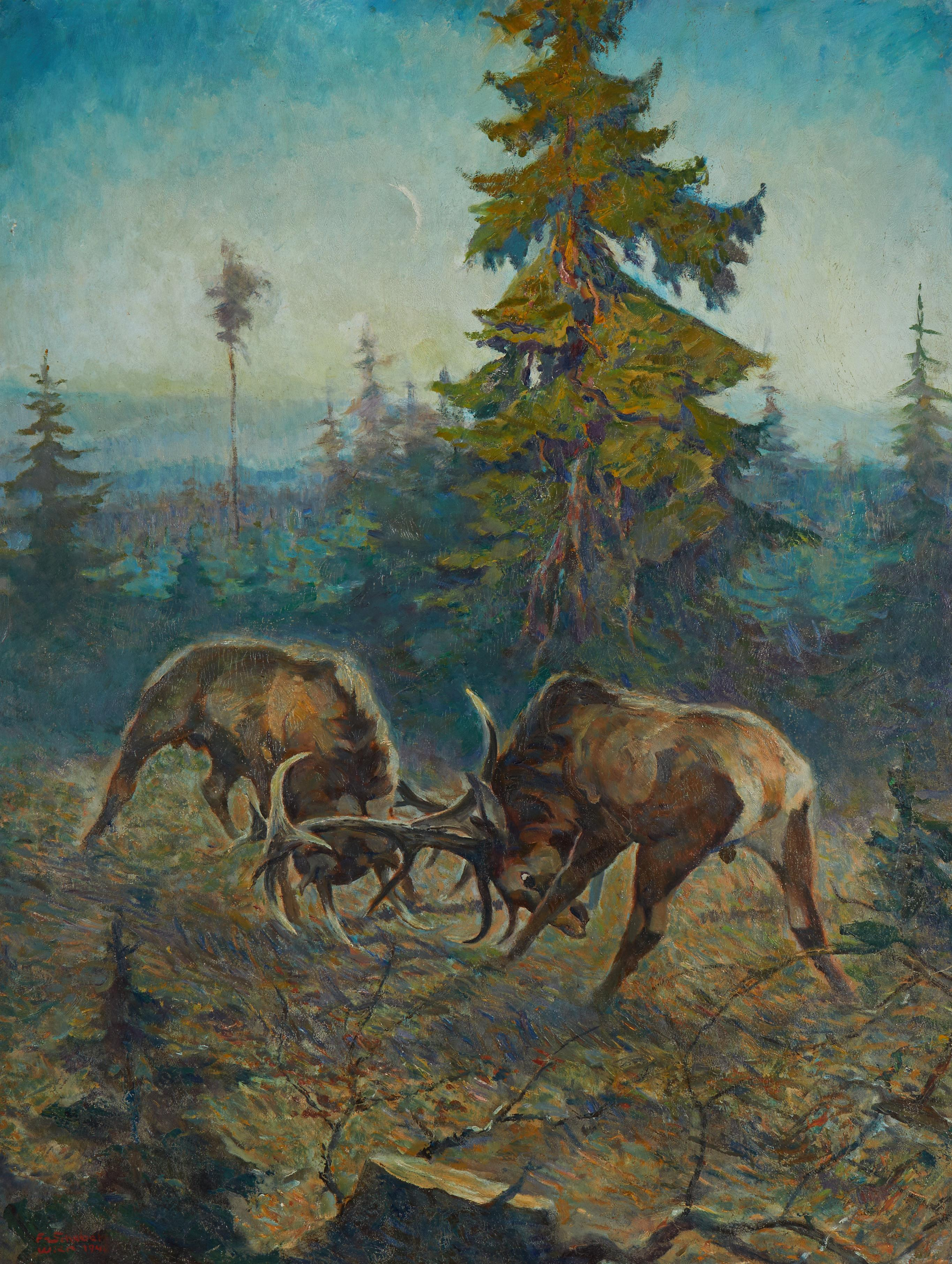
Fighting deer, 1940

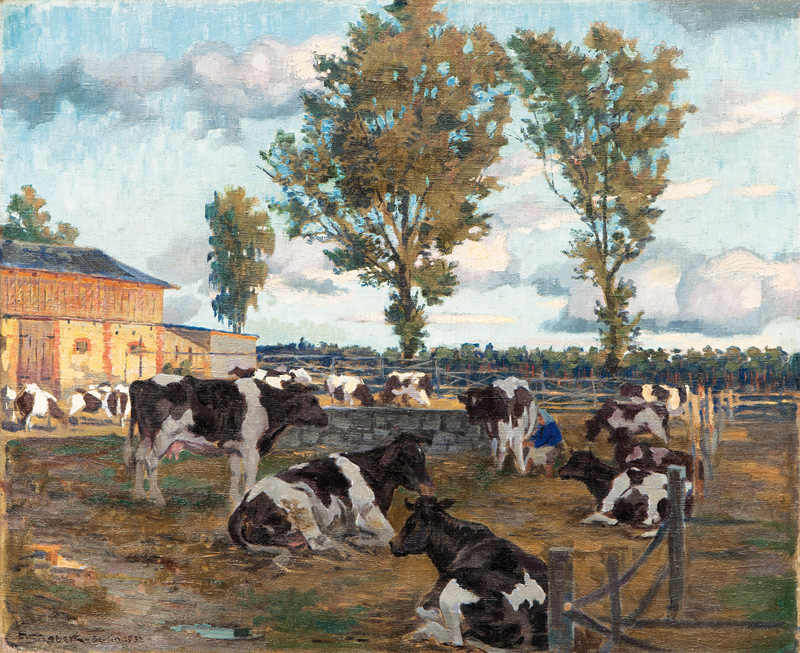
Milking place in Mecklenburg, 1932

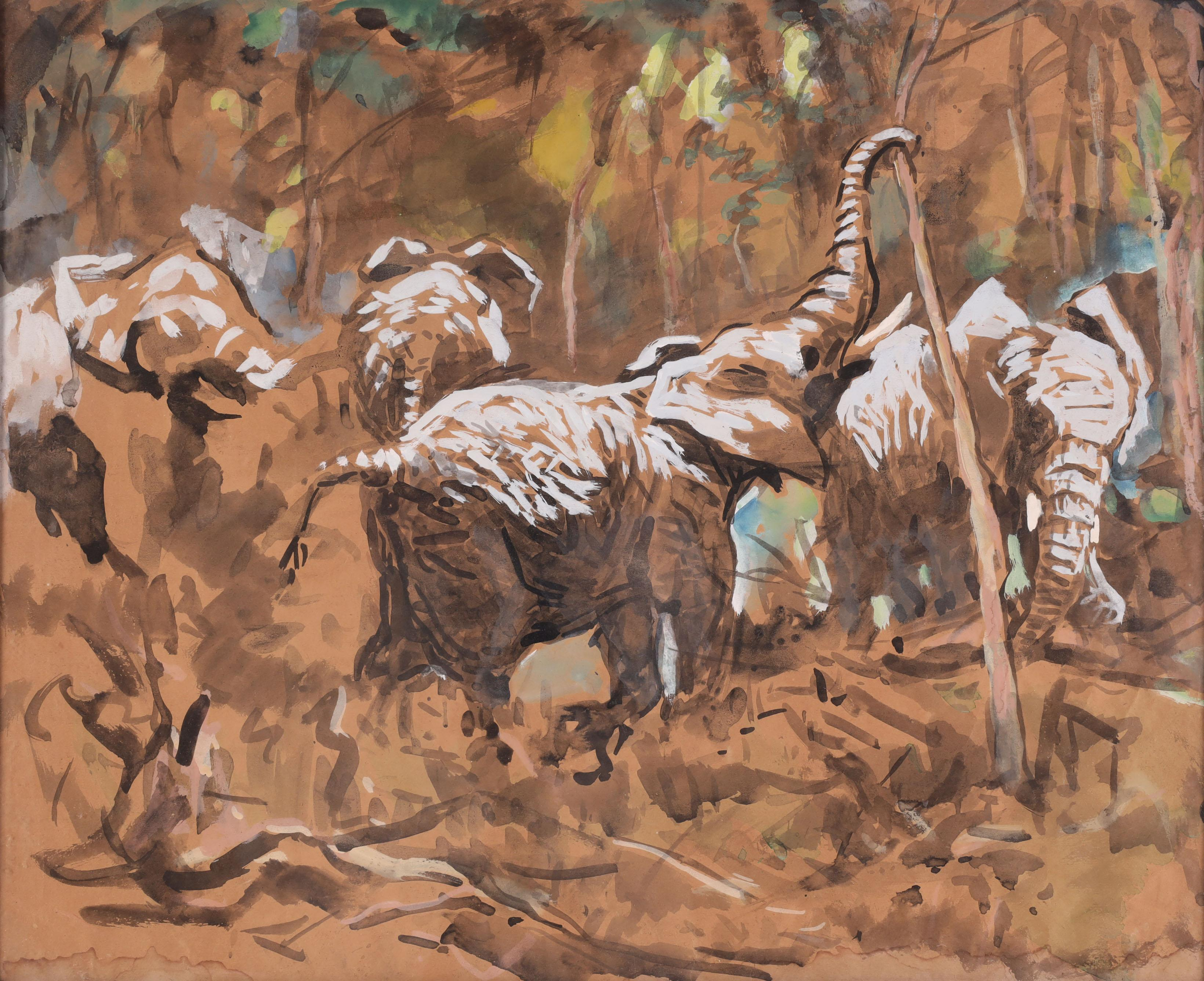
Elephant herd, <1949

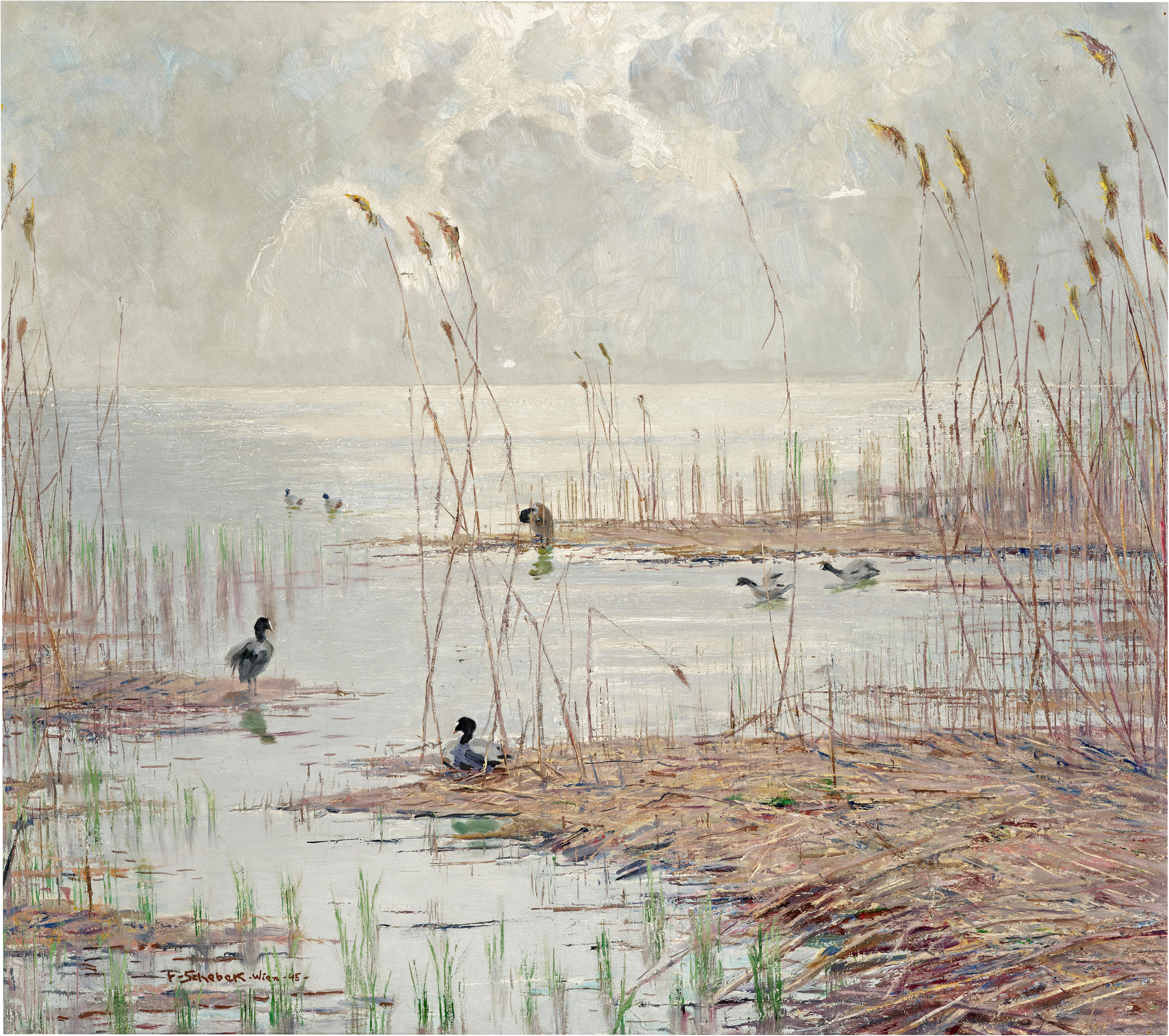
Motive of the Tollensesee, 1945

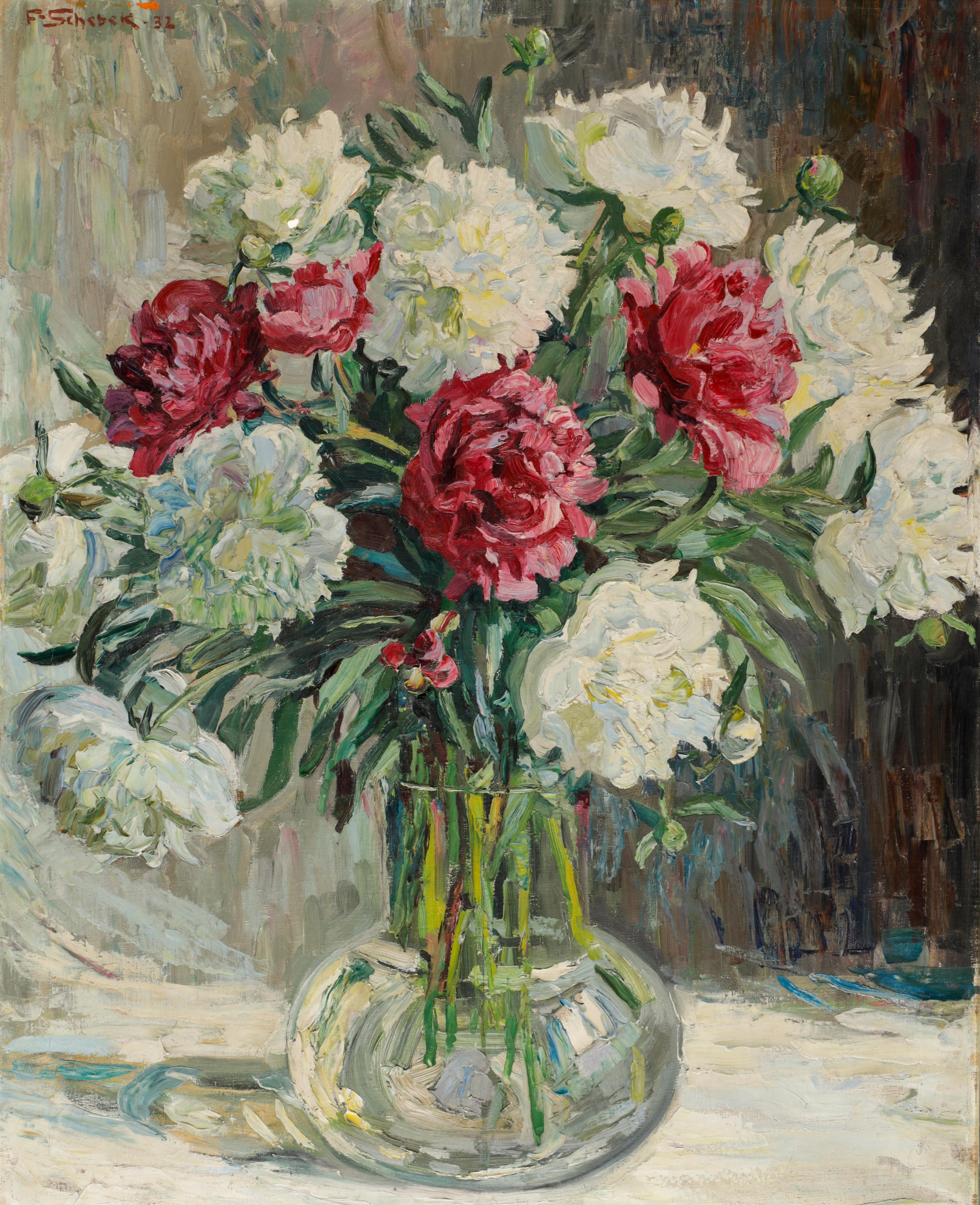
Still life with peonies, 1932

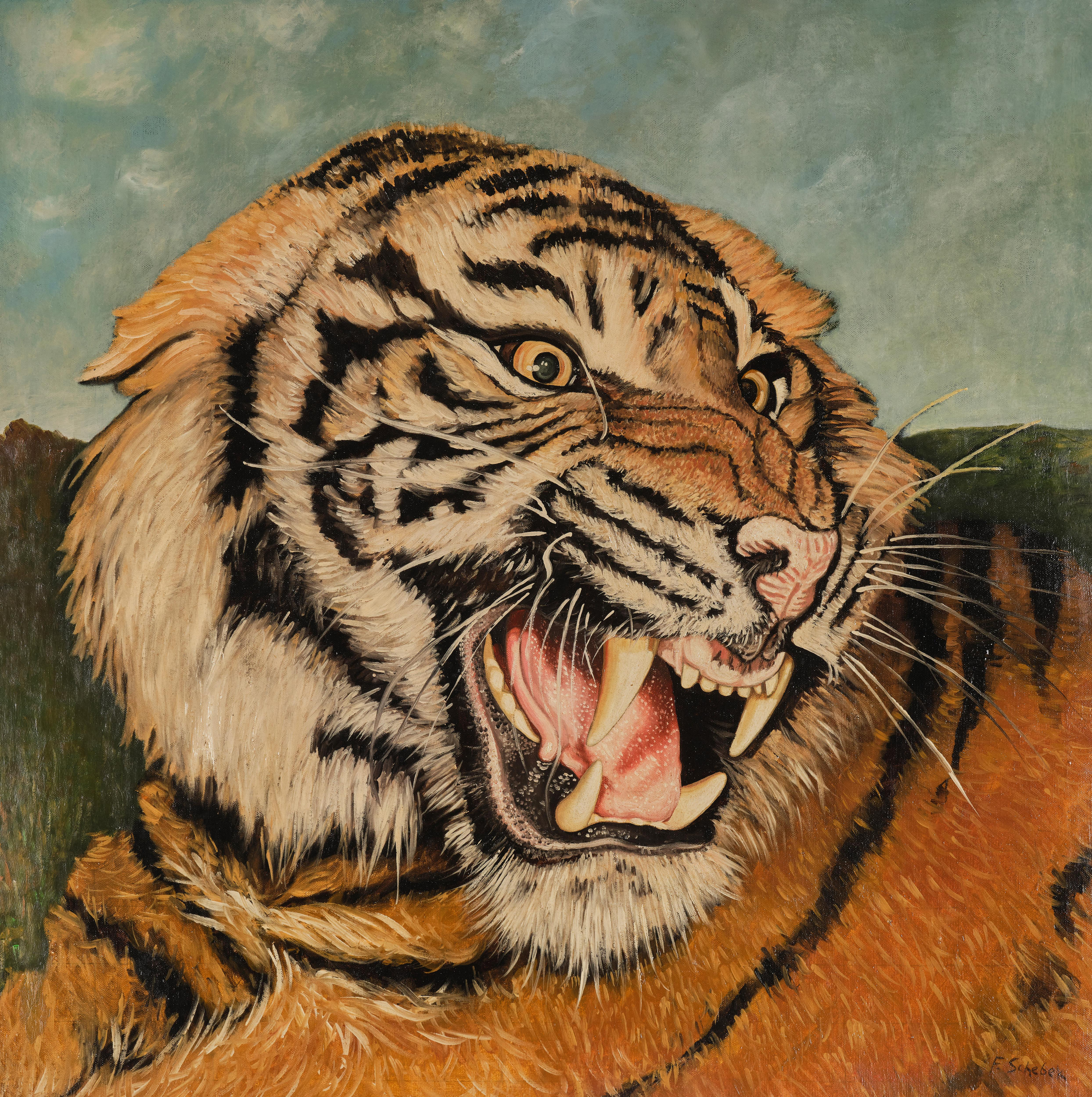
Tiger, <1949

== Literature ==
- Thieme, Ulrich; Becker, Felix; Vollmer, Hans. Allgemeines Lexikon der bildenden Künstler: von der Antike bis zur Gegenwart. Vol. 29. E. A. Seemann, 1978. p. 386.
- Busse, Joachim. Internationales Handbuch aller Maler und Bildhauer des 19. Jahrhunderts. 1977. p. 1109. ISBN 3-9800062-0-4.
- Bénézit, Emmanuel. Dictionnaire critique et documentaire des peintres, sculpteurs, dessinateurs et graveurs de tous les temps et de tous les pays. Vol. 12. Gründ, 1999. p. 386. ISBN 2-7000-3010-9.
- Allgemeines Künstlerlexikon: Bio-bibliographischer Index A-Z, Vol. 8. Saur, 1999–2000. p. 750. ISBN 3-598-23910-6.
