= Wilhelm Sauter =

German painter

- Born: 1 April 1896; Bruchsal, Germany
- Died: 27 June 1948 (aged 52); Göppingen, Germany
- Awards: Gaukulturpreis; 1939
- Patrons: Adolf Hitler

Wilhelm Sauter (1 April 1896 – 27 June 1948) was a German painter, known especially for his portraits of soldiers in both World Wars.

== Life and work ==
He was the only son of Friedrich Sauter; a civil service clerk. After graduating from the local Realschule in 1913, he went to Heidelberg, where he attended the Lehrerseminar (Teacher's School), with the intention of becoming a drawing teacher. In 1915, he was conscripted and served in an infantry division that was deployed to the front. There, in 1916, near Serre-lès-Puisieux, he was involved in the Battle of the Somme and lost part of his hearing, as the result of a grenade explosion that buried him alive.

After a stay in the hospital, he was mustered out and worked at an elementary school in Bruchsal. From 1918 to 1920, he studied at the Badischen Landeskunstschule, under Professors Walter Conz and Friedrich Fehr, among others. This was followed by temporary employment at several schools, in Villingen, Bruchsal, Karlsruhe, Weinheim, and Ladenburg. With the encouragement of Hans Thoma, he held his first exhibition at the Badischer Kunstverein.

In addition to drawing, he was also a painter and an etcher. From 1924 to 1927, he created six drypoint illustrations for the satirical novel, Simplicius Simplicissimus, by Grimmelshausen. He also did portraits and landscapes but, at that time, was already focusing on the depiction of soldiers.

Eventually, his works attracted the attention of the Nazi regime. Although they were never meant to be a glorification of war, the Nazis considered them to be a fine example of brave German soldiers, steeled in battle. The extent to which Sauter sympathized with Nazi ideology, if at all, remains unclear, but he quickly came to terms with the situation.

His career was immediately and greatly advanced, with more exposure at exhibitions, such as the "Heroische Kunst" of 1935 in Berlin, the Baden Gaukulturschau of 1937, several of the Große Deutsche Kunstausstellung in Munich, and the Venice Biennale in 1942. During this period, his portrayals became less gloomy and more heroic. A few are specifically targeted at a National Socialist audience.

His pictures were acquired by several museums; notably the Wehrgeschichtliches Museum Rastatt. They were also purchased by Adolf Hitler and Fritz Todt. In 1941, he was named a professor at his alma mater, the Staatliche Akademie in Karlsruhe. He remained there until the end of the war.

== Works ==
- Totentanz (Danse macabre) (1917–1918)
- Grabenposten im Feuer (Trench Post under Fire) (1928)
- Essenholer (Food Porter) (1931)
- Im Laufgraben (In the Communication Trench) (1932)
- Endlose Straße (Endless Street) (1934)
- Der gute Kamerad (The Good Comrade) (1934)
- Wassertrinker (Water Drinkers) (1936)
- Der Bauernführer Joß Fritz (The Peasant Leader Joss Fritz) (1937)
- Kampfzeit (Time of Fight) (1937)
- Die Badischen Grenadiere in der Schlacht bei Cambrai (The Baden Grenadiers in the Battle of Cambrai) (1938)
- Zwei Wege (Two Ways) (1939)
- Der ewige Musketier (The Eternal Soldier) (1940)
- Vormarsch im Westen (Advance in the West) (1941)
- Westfront 1940 (Western Front 1940) (1941) (former property of Adolf Hitler, now being housed at the U.S. Army Center of Military History at Fort Belvoir)
- Serre (Somme) 1916 (ca. 1942)
- Übergang am Oberrhein (Crossing the Upper Rhine) (1942)
- Verschüttet (Buried Alive)
- Begegnung (Encounter)
- Das Kreuz von Serre (The Cross of Serre)
- Der ewige Musketier (The Eternal Soldier)
- l.M.G. (light Machine Gun)
- Stoßtrupp (Stormtroopers)
- Ums Morgengrauen (At Sunrise)
- Der tote Kamerad (The Dead Comrade)
- Melder (Despatch Runner)
- Das Opfer (The Sacrifice) (destroyed during an air raid in 1942)
- Frontsoldat (Front Soldier)

== See also ==
- List of German painters
