= Erich Kips =

German painter

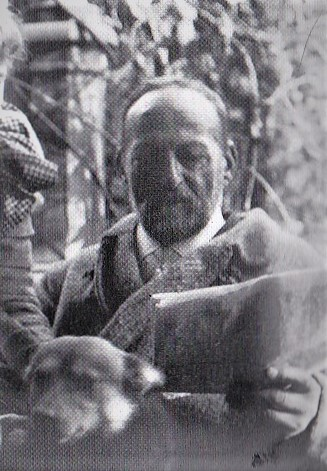
Erich Kips (c.1900)

Erich Conrad Friedrich Kips (17 January 1869 – 26 September 1945) was a German landscape and cityscape painter. His pictures were often reproduced for advertising posters, calendars, and postcards.

== Biography ==
He was born in Berlin to Johan Friedrich Kips (1829–1903), a room and sign painter, and his wife, Wilhelmine Friederike Rosalie née Müller (1832–1895). His older brother, Alexander, also became a landscape painter. In 1887, he began attending classes at the instructional annex of the Arts and Crafts Museum, where he studied with Emil Doepler and Max Friedrich Koch. In 1889, he transferred to the Academy of Fine Arts, Karlsruhe. He also studied portrait painting with Caspar Ritter. His first commission came while he was there; a painting to celebrate the 25th anniversary of the lamp company, Schwintzer & Gräff.

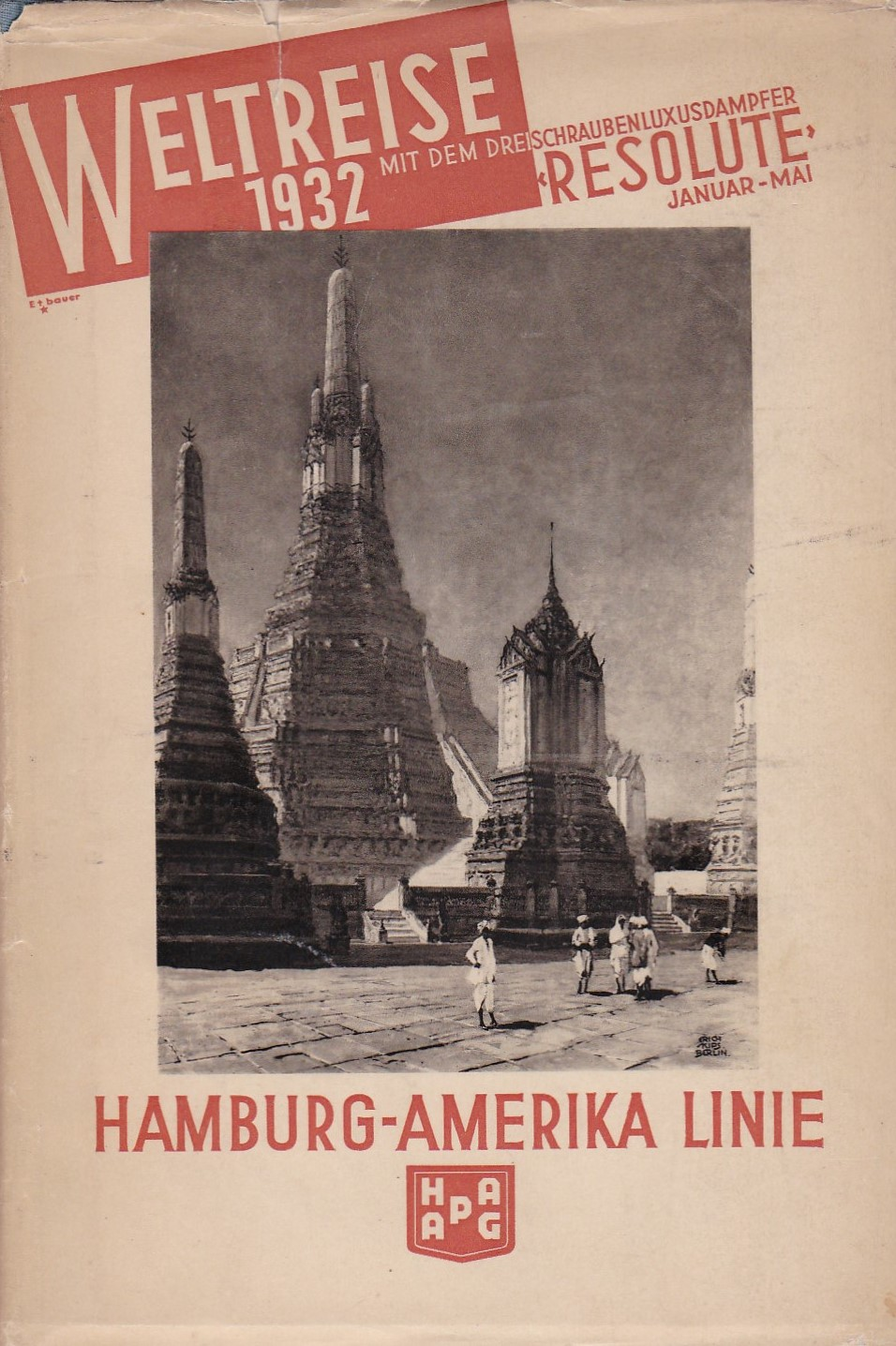
Hamburg America Line catalog, cover by Kips

In 1893, he went to the United States to create decorations in the German pavilion at the World's Columbian Exposition in Chicago. Some of his award-winning designs were done in collaboration with the sculptor, Otto Lessing. During this time, he became involved in creating monumental paintings at the Prussian House of Representatives; a project that kept him occupied until 1898; interrupted by an extended stay in Italy. He also spent a short time polishing his skills at the Académie Julian in Paris. He shared a studio in Berlin with his brother, Alexander, until 1910, when he able to acquire a home with a studio of his own.

From 1898, he was regular participant in exhibitions, including the Große Münchener Kunstausstellung, in the Glaspalast, the Große Berliner Kunstausstellung, and the Große Kunstausstellung NRW Düsseldorf. Following a showing at the Glaspalast, the Director of the art department at Carnegie Mellon University, John Wesley Beatty (1848-1924), invited him to participate in the Carnegie International exhibition of 1914. One of his landscapes received an "honorable mention", and was later displayed at the Albright-Knox Art Gallery in Buffalo. Another painting, "Steamer in the Dock", was shown again at the Panama–Pacific International Exposition in 1915, and awarded a bronze medal. These, and other works, remained in the United States until after World War I, as "Alien Property".

After the war, he resumed exhibiting, beginning with a painting of the first Prussian Tank Squadron of 1871, for the 50th anniversary of the port of Wilhelmshaven. He was represented at several exhibitions of the Verein Berliner Künstler (artists' association), of which he was a member from 1911 to 1939. He embarked on a five-month trip around the world on the steamship, Resolute, in 1930. Many of the works that resulted were used for postcards and advertising catalogs. In 1932, he travelled on the Resolute again; to the Norwegian fjords.

From 1937, his works were represented at the official Nazi Große Deutsche Kunstausstellung. In 1939, he underwent a major operation, which created economic hardships, forcing him to rely on support from the Künstlerdank foundation of the Reichsministerium für Volksaufklärung und Propaganda. In 1940, his painting of Danzig was acquired by Hitler. It was lost in the war. During his last years, he also painted frescoes. including murals at the Staatsoper Unter den Linden. They were heavily damaged during World War II.

On 25 September 1945, he married his long-time companion, Martha Wodarz. He died the next day at his home in Berlin.

== Selected paintings ==
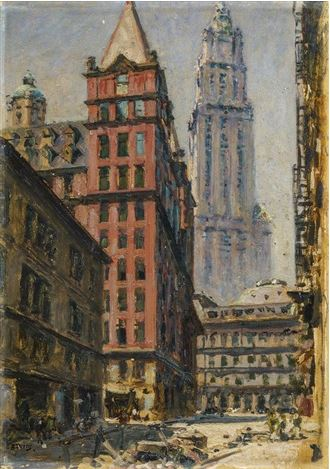
Woolworth Building

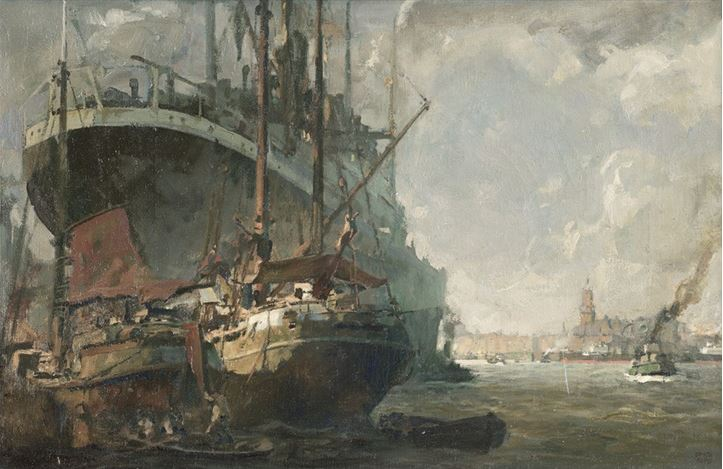
Steamer and Sailing Ship in Hamburg Harbor

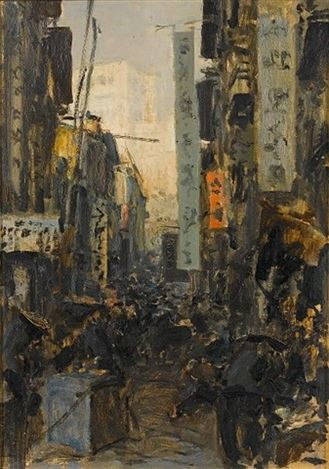
Hong Kong Street

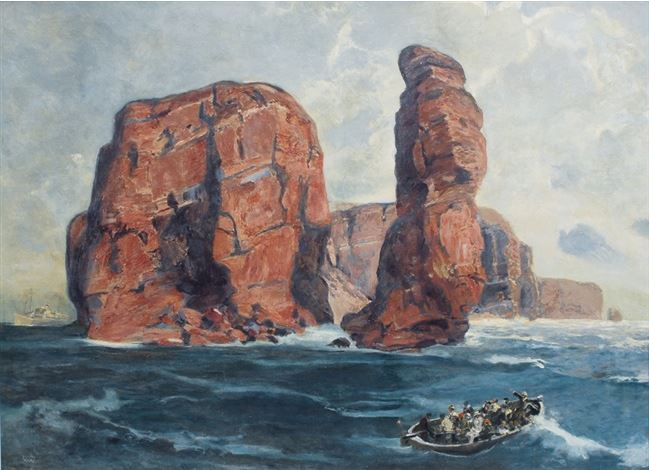
Helgoland

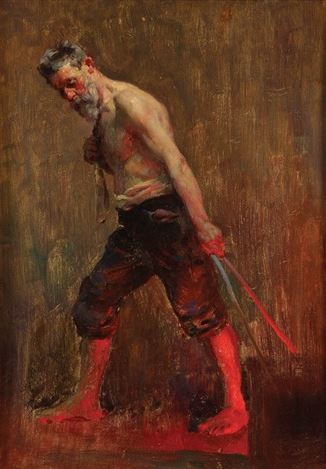
Foundry Worker
