= Raffael Schuster-Woldan =

German artist (1870–1951)

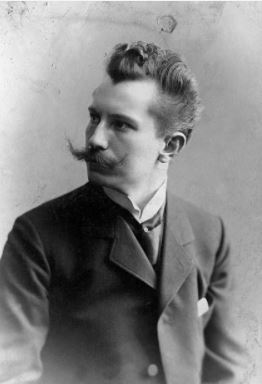
Raffael Schuster-Woldan (c.1900)

Raffael Hans Ulrich Schuster-Woldan (7 January 1870 – 13 December 1951) was a German painter and art professor associated with the Munich Secession.

== Life and work ==
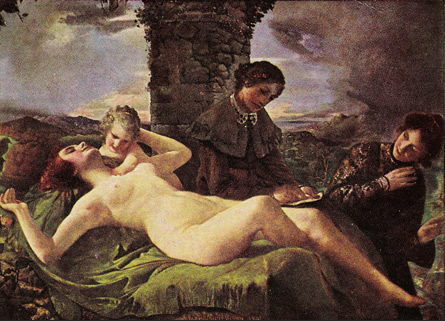
Life (Das Leben), once owned by Hitler, now in the Deutsches Historisches Museum

Born in Striegau, he was the youngest of three children born to Heinrich Schuster, a Court Councilor, and his wife Clara née Seifart. In 1887, he left the local gymnasium without graduating, and followed his older brother, Georg to Munich, where they took lessons at the private art school operated by Frank Kirchbach. In 1889, he accompanied Kirchbach on visits to Frankfurt and Paris. As an addition to his studies, he visited the workshops of other artists. He was also influenced by the Rembrandt etchings he saw at the Münchner Kupferstichkabinett. During this time, he adopted the pseudonym "Woldan", from his father, who had used it to publish a volume of poetry.

After completing his studies, he settled in Dinkelsbühl, but soon moved to Rothenburg, where he began working en plein aire. Feeling the need for improvement, he went to Munich, where he enrolled at the Academy of Fine Arts to study nature painting with Gabriel von Hackl. He took his first study trip to Italy in 1891; experimenting with religious motifs in his landscapes. While in Florence, he became a member of the German-founded Art History Institute.

His first major showing was at the Glaspalast in 1893, where he was nominated for a gold medal. Three years later, he was awarded one there. He also won a gold medal at the Saint Louis Exposition of 1897. At the suggestion of the art historian, Wolfgang von Oettingen, he entered a competition to select an artist for ceiling paintings at the Reichstag building. He was one of three selected. Much of the work was done in Munich; creating canvases that would be set into the ceiling. In 1904, he moved to Berlin to see his commission through to its completion and dedication, which took place in 1911, and he would live there until 1941. He was appointed a Professor of Composition at the Prussian Academy of Art shortly after the dedication; a position he held until 1920. He was named a full member of the academy in 1914.

Following the rise of the Nazis, his older, sometimes mythological styles found favor with the party's supporters, and he was commissioned to do several female portraits. These included Winifred Wagner, Cosima Wagner and Emmy Göring. He was awarded the Goethe-Medaille für Kunst und Wissenschaft in 1940, and his works were featured at the Große Deutsche Kunstausstellung of 1941. Hitler bought one for 60,000 ℛ︁ℳ︁. Shortly after, he moved to the safety of a remote location in Bavaria where he died, ten years later, in Garmisch-Partenkirchen.
