= Hans Spiegel =

German painter

- Born: 1 February 1893; Münnerstadt, Germany
- Died: 15 September 1966 (aged 72); Stuttgart, Germany
- Occupation: Painter

Hans Spiegel (1 February 1893 – 15 September 1966) was a German painter. His work was part of the painting event in the art competition at the 1936 Summer Olympics.
