= Hans Schmitz-Wiedenbrück =

German painter (1907–1944)

- Born: January 1907; Lippstadt, Westphalia, Germany
- Died: 7 December 1944 (aged 37); Düsseldorf-Angermund, Germany
- Known for: Sacral, peasant, and Nazi propaganda art

Hans Schmitz-Wiedenbrück was the alias of Hans Schmitz (3 January 1907 - 7 December 1944) was a German painter of sacral, peasant and Nazi propaganda arts. He belonged to the Wiedenbrücker Schule school of arts.

== Biography ==
Hans Schmitz was born in the Lippstadt / Westphalia as the son of a hotel caretaker. Beginning in 1923, he was trained in the studio of Heinrich Repke in the nearby city of Wiedenbrück where he worked for a total of 17 years, interrupted by studies in Kassel, Munich and Brussels and study trips to Denmark, Belgium, the Netherlands, Switzerland and Italy. With his oil painting Familienbild (Family Painting) he won second prize in the arts competition Die neue deutsche Familie (The New German Family). In 1939 he was awarded the Großer Staatspreis der Preußischen Akademie der Künste (Great State Award of the Prussian Academy of Arts). Furthermore, he received the arts award Jung-Westfalen (Young Westphalia, 1939) and the Gaukulturpreis Westfalen-Süd (Gau Culture Award Southern Westphalia, 1941). Hans Schmitz-Wiedenbrück exhibited at the 22nd Venice Biennale. The artist is especially known for his 1941 triptych Arbeiter, Bauern und Soldaten (Workers, Farmers and Soldiers, sold to Adolf Hitler for a price of 30,000 reichsmark) and the oil painting Kämpfendes Volk (Fighting People, sold to Joseph Goebbels for a price of 56,000 reichsmark) which was exhibited at the 1941 Große Deutsche Kunstausstellung (Great German Arts Exhibition) in Munich. Hitler also bought Schmitz-Wiedenbrück's oil painting Bauern im Gewitter (Farmers in a Thunderstorm, 1939, 4,500 reichsmark) and Das Johannisfeuer (Saint John's Fire, 1940, 14,000 reichsmark) while Martin Bormann paid 25,000 reichsmark for the painting Tischgesellschaft (Table Companionship, 1944) and 20,000 reichsmark for Frau mit Stier (Woman with Bull, 1944). Many of Schmitz’ paintings from this period of time have to be considered Nazi propaganda art.

The fact that Joseph Goebbels suggested 36 year-old Hans Schmitz for a professorship at the Düsseldorf Arts Academy in 1943 illustrates the Nazi regime's sympathies for this artist. In the same year, Hans Schmitz was drafted and consequently worked as a war painter. He died from a heart attack on 7 December of the following year in Angermund.

== Controversy ==
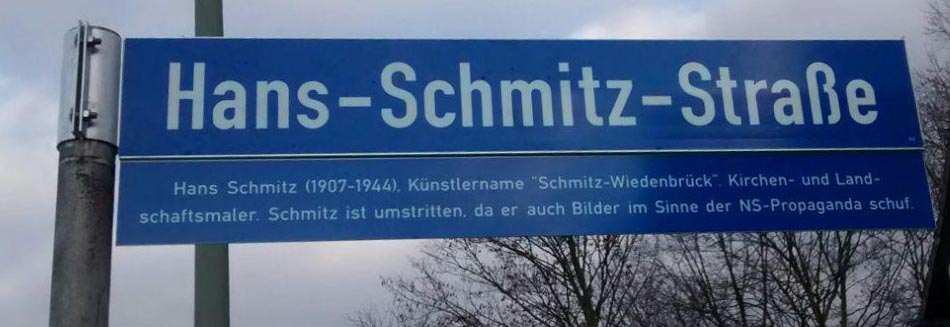
Controversial tribute: Hans Schmitz Street in Rheda-Wiedenbrück

In his native city Rheda-Wiedenbrück, an open discussion about Hans Schmitz’ role during the time of National Socialism began in 2016. Up to this day, three of his paintings from the years 1937 and 1939 are publicly displayed in the historic city hall. Furthermore, a street is named after him.
