= Darmstädter Sezession =

The Darmstädter Sezession (Darmstadt Secession) is an association of visual artists based in Darmstadt, Germany. It was founded in 1919. When it was revived in 1945, it was sometimes also called Neue Darmstädter Sezession (New Darmstadt Secession).

== History ==
In 1919 a circle of artists and friends in Darmstadt felt the need to create a spiritual center. The association known as the Secession was founded on 8 June 1919 by 21 people including Max Beckmann and Ludwig Meidner. The first Secession catalogue stated "Darmstadt feels strong enough to rise from artistic province to artistic capital again, from a metropolis of spiritual reaction to a center of new spiritual values."

The exhibition "Deutscher Expressionismus Darmstadt 1920" (German Expressionism Darmstadt 1920) was of national importance. Besides works by Expressionists it also showed the art of Cubists, Dadaists, Constructivists and representatives of Neue Sachlichkeit (New Objectivity). Some of the subsequent exhibitions caused scandals, such as "Deutsche Kunst Darmstadt 1923" (German Art Darmstadt 1923) and in 1929 "Der schöne Mensch in der neuen Kunst" (Beautiful Man in the New Art). When the Nazis came to power in 1933, some of the members of the Secession went into "internal exile", and others emigrated. Still others joined the resistance against the regime.

After the war the Secession was founded again in the autumn of 1945, assuming that it had been banned, but no evidence of a ban has been found so far. In 1954 the first photographer, Otto Steinert, was accepted.

Today the association has more than 100 members in Germany, more than 20% of them in Berlin. Speakers of the board as of 2007 are Barbara Bredow and Horst D. Bürkle.

== Annual show and Prize for Young Artists ==
The Secession organises an annual exhibition in the fields of painting, graphics, sculpture and photography at the Darmstadt Mathildenhöhe, as well as various special exhibitions. Since 1975, a biennial prize has been awarded to young artists, funded by the HSE Foundation and the city of Darmstadt. Since 1987, an additional Förderpreis ("development prize") has been awarded, funded by the Lions Club from 2007.

== Literature ==
- Welsch, Sabine; Darmstädter Sezession; Institut Mathildenhöhe (1997). Die Darmstädter Sezession 1919 - 1997 die Kunst des 20. Jahrhunderts im Spiegel einer Künstlervereinigung (in German). Darmstadt. ISBN 978-3-9804553-3-6. OCLC 231701980.
