= Hans Schmidt (footballer, born 1887) =

German footballer

Personal information
- Full name: Hans Schmidt
- Date of birth: 2 November 1887
- Place of birth: Berlin, German Empire
- Date of death: 9 July 1916 (aged 28)
- Place of death: Germany
- Position: Outside right

Youth career
- 1896–1905: BFC Germania 1888

Senior career*
Years	Team	Apps	(Gls)
1905–1915	BFC Germania 1888		

International career
1908	Germany	1	(0)
- * Club domestic league appearances and goals

Hans Schmidt (2 November 1887 – 9 July 1916) was a German footballer who played as an outside right and made one appearance for the Germany national team.

== Career ==
Schmidt earned his first and only cap for Germany on 7 June 1908 in a friendly against Austria. The away match, which was played in Vienna, finished as a 2–3 loss for Germany.

== Personal life ==
Schmidt died on 9 July 1916 in World War I at the age of 28.

== Career statistics ==
=== International ===
Germany
Year	Apps	Goals
1908	1	0
Total	1	0
