= Bernhard Bleeker =

German sculptor

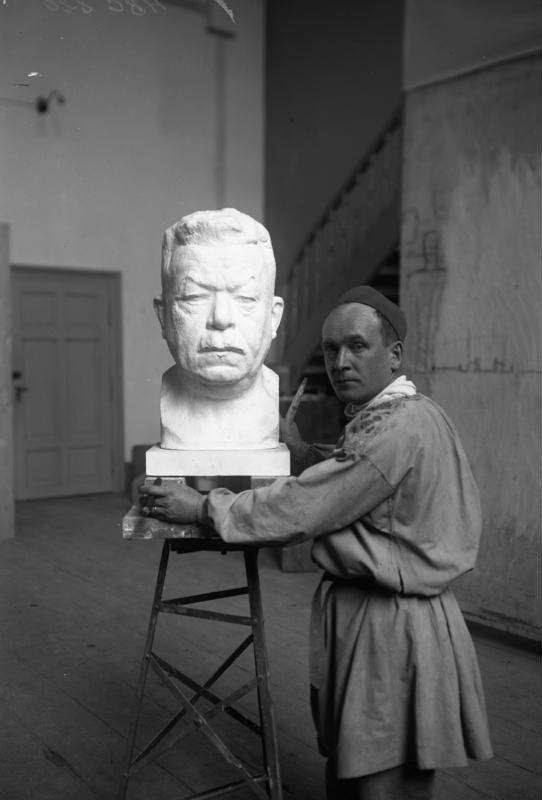
- Bleeker with a bust of Friedrich Ebert, 1927
- Born: 26 July 1881; Münster, Westphalia
- Died: 11 March 1968 (aged 86); Munich
- Education: Munich Academy with Wilhelm von Rümann
- Known for: Sculpture
- Movement: Munich School, Neoclassic Sculptures

Josef Bernhard Maria Bleeker (26 July 1881 – 11 March 1968) was a German sculptor.

== Life ==
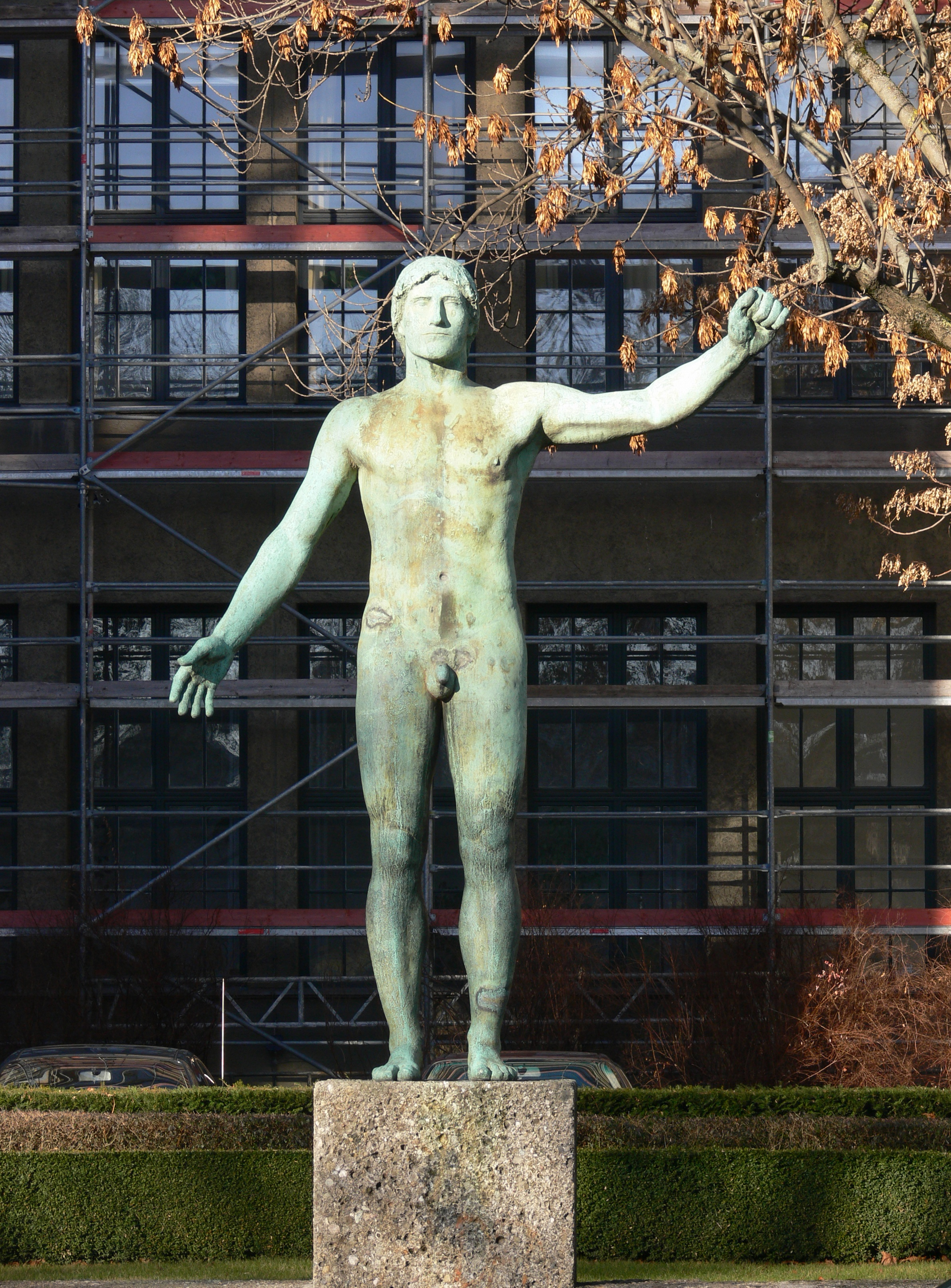
The Horse Tamer (Der Rossbändiger), 1931, in front of the Alte Pinakothek

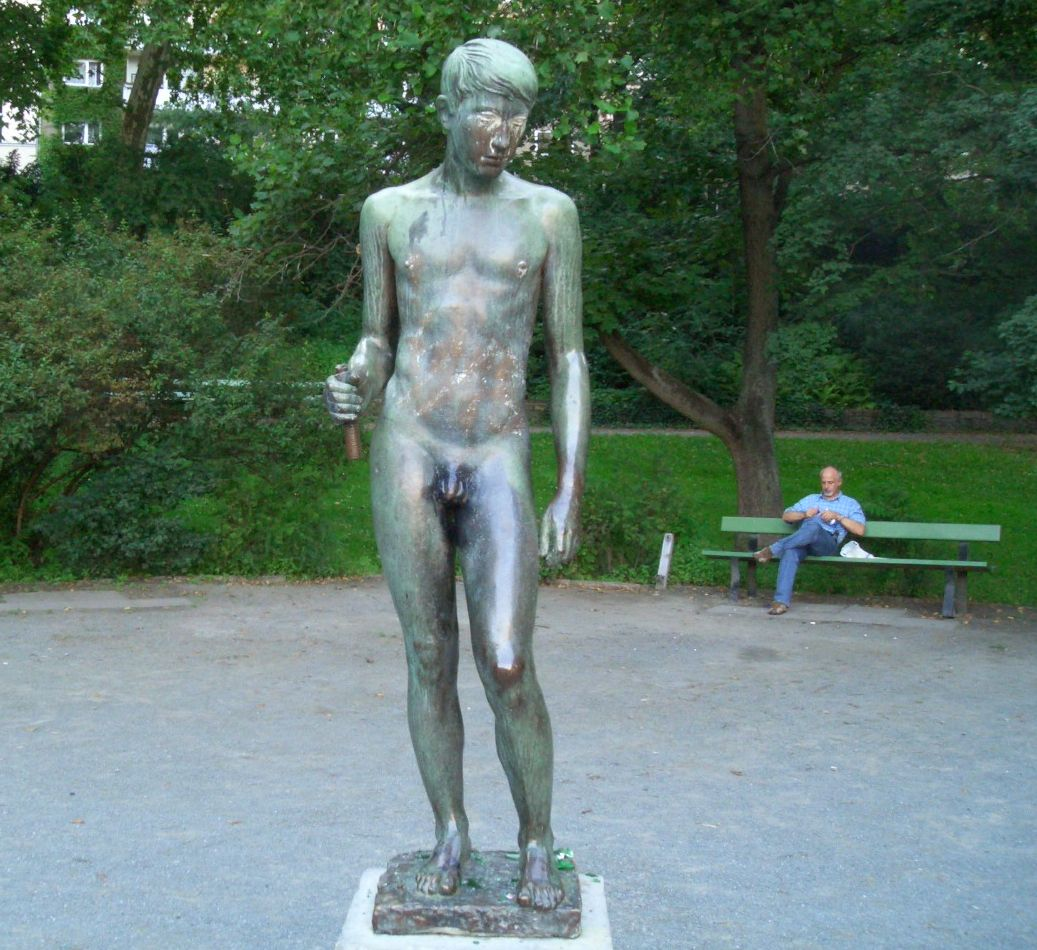
Spear carrier (Speerträger) (at present without spear), 1940, at Lietzensee Park, Berlin

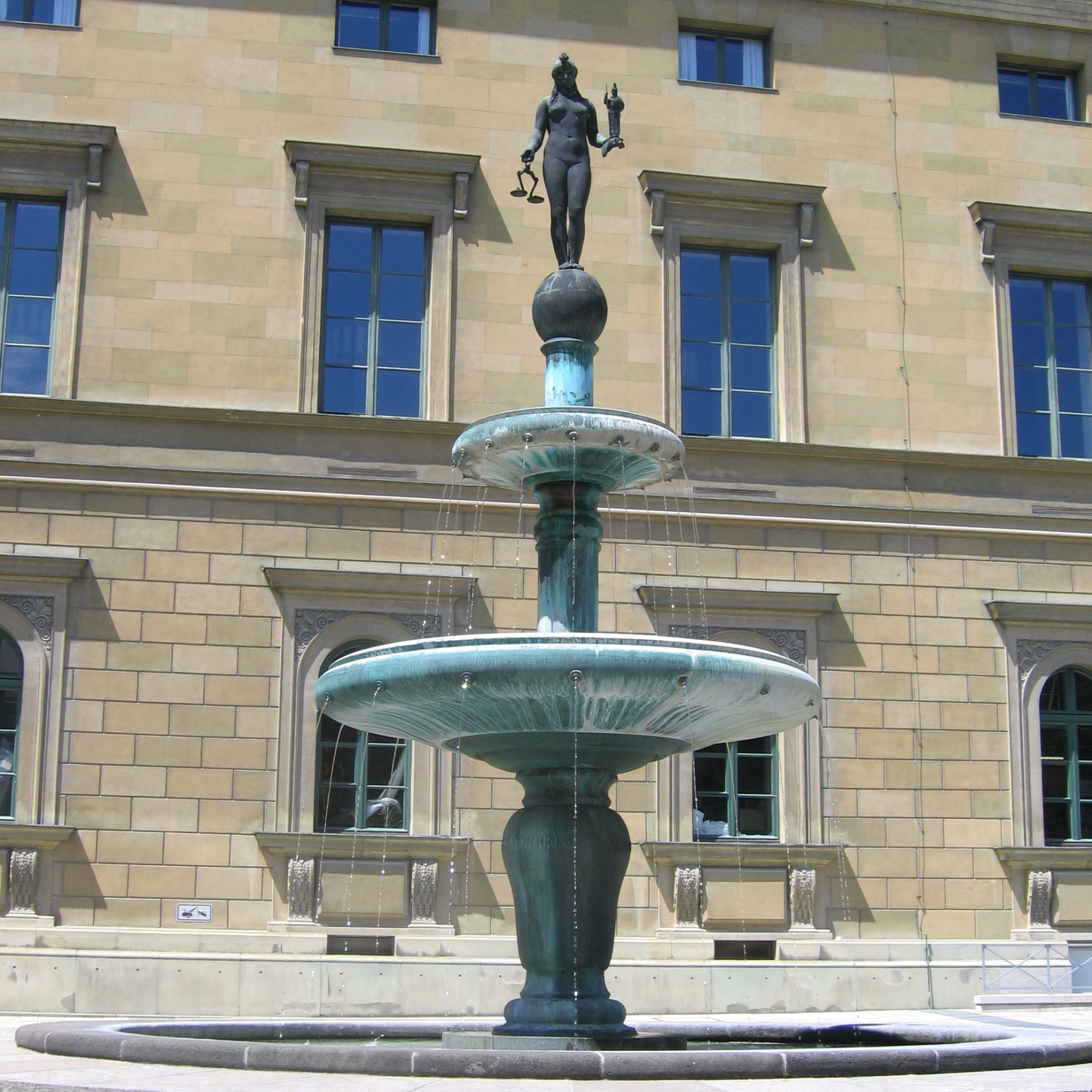
Crown Prince Rupprecht Fountain in Munich, 1961

Bernhard Bleeker was born on 26 July 1881 in Münster, Westphalia, North (Germany). After training as a stonemason in Münster and Munich he worked on various Munich building sites. In 1903 Bleeker received his first public contract to build a monument in Miesbach. He built a fountain with a sculpture of Saint Michael slaying the dragon. "This work is still influenced by a typically neobaroque style, represented by his teacher Rümann and other numerous artist-colleagues." Later he came under the influence of Adolf von Hildebrand, probably the most significant sculptor of that time. Bleeker is supposed to be one of the main representatives of the Munich School of Sculptors, a significant bust sculptor and a builder of neo-classical monomuents.

In 1912 he founded with others the "Neue Münchener Secession". In 1918 he started teaching at the Munich Academy and became a full professor ("Ordentlicher Professor") in 1922. "During the Third Reich, Bleeker as a well respected artist often participated in propagandistic exhibitions, for example at the Große Deutsche Kunstausstellung at the Haus der Deutschen Kunst in Munich." He obtained the order to create a bust of Adolf Hitler (Bust at German Historical Museum). He reworked it several times and up to 1944 25 busts were delivered to the Nationalsozialistische Deutsche Arbeiterpartei (NSDAP). As a result of his connection to the Nazi regime he lost his teaching post at the Munich Academy in 1945. In 1951 he was rehabilitated and became a member of the Academy of Fine Arts in Vienna and an honorary member of the Munich Academy. In 1968 he died in Munich.

== Selected works ==
For a full list see:

- 1910/11 Bust "Prinzregent Luitpold"
- 1924/25 "Dead Warrior" (Toter Krieger) in the crypt of the war memorial in the Munich Hofgarten
- 1931 Bleeker's most famous piece of art, the "Horse Tamer" (Rossebändiger) at the Technical University of Munich, was heavily damaged in World War II. As a result, the horse was melted down. Today the tamer stands in front of the Alte Pinakothek. Busts of Friedrich Ebert, Max Liebermann, Paul von Hindenburg and Max Slevogt.
- 1935 A second version of the "Dead Warrior" for the Hindenburg Crypt in the Tannenberg Memorial.
- 1944 Monument "August Neidhardt von Gneisenau" in Posen (now Poznań, Poland).

== Awards and distinctions ==
- 1917 Royal Ludwigs Medal in Gold (Königliche Ludwigs-Medaille in Gold)
- 1928 Bavarian Maximilian Order for Science and Art (der Bayrische Maximiliansorden für Wissenschaft und Kunst)
- 1930 Member of the Prussian Academy of Arts (Preußischen Akademie der Künste zu Berlin).
- 1956 Culture Prize of the City of Munich (Förderpreis im Bereich Bildende Kunst der Landeshauptstadt München)
- 1961 Golden Honorary Coin of the City of Munich (Goldene Ehrenmünze der Stadt München).

== Literature ==
- Frank Henseleit: Der Bildhauer Bernhard Bleeker (1881–1968). Leben und Werk. Dissertation, Universität Augsburg 2006 (Online – full text, 307 pages, PDF 2,44MB)
- Claus Pese: Mehr als nur Kunst. Das Archiv für Bildende Kunst i m Germanischen Nationalmuseum. (= Kulturgeschichtliche Spaziergänge im Germanischen Nationalmuseum; Bd.2). Ostfildern-Ruit 1998, pp. 40–43, 84
- The written legacy is part of the German Art Archive at the German Nationalmuseum.
