= Hans Schwegerle =

German sculptor

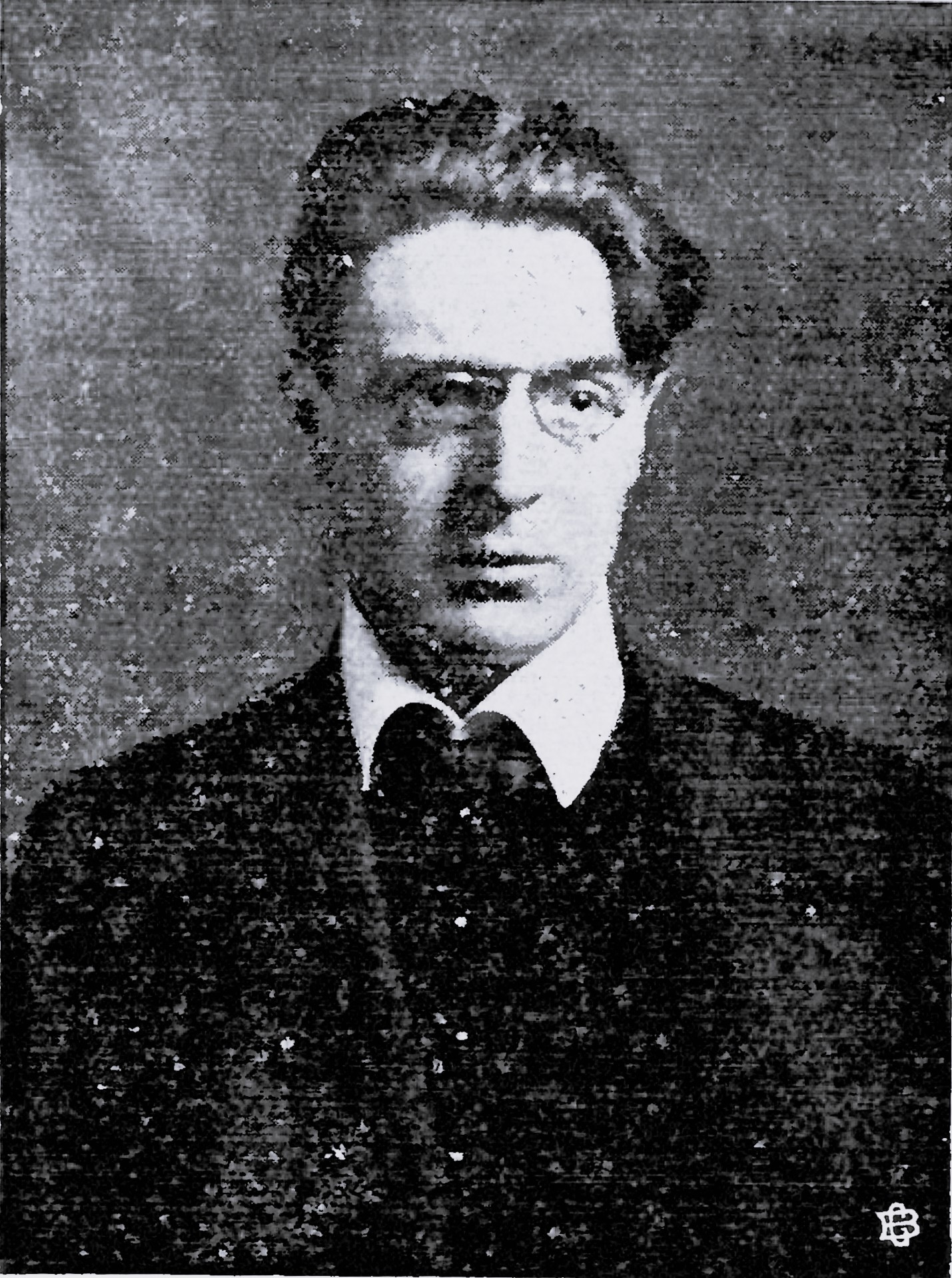
- Born: 2 May 1882; Lübeck, German Empire
- Died: 3 September 1950 (aged 68); Munich, West Germany
- Occupation: Sculptor

Hans Schwegerle (2 May 1882 – 3 September 1950) was a German sculptor. His work was part of the sculpture event in the art competition at the 1928 Summer Olympics.
