= Otto Kirchner (painter) =

German painter

- Born: 1887; Eckartshausen, German Empire
- Died: 1960; Munich, West Germany
- Known for: Painting

Otto Kirchner (1887, Eckartshausen – 1960) was a German painter of portraits and genre scenes.

German portrait and genre painter Otto Kirchner was born in 1887 in Eckartshausen, Lower Franconia. From 1908 to 1909 Kirchner was a student of a private drawing school in Dusseldorf. In the years from 1910 to 1911 he took a study trip to Italy and Switzerland. In 1913, Kirchner studied at the Munich Academy under Martin Feuerstein. Kirchner first worked in religious painting, and in 1918 turned to genre. In 1919 he took part in the exhibitions in the Glaspalast Munich. Otto Kirchner died in 1960 in Munich.
