= Academy of Fine Arts Vienna =

Art school in Austria

Coordinates: 48°12′05″N 16°21′55″E

- Akademie der bildenden Künste Wien
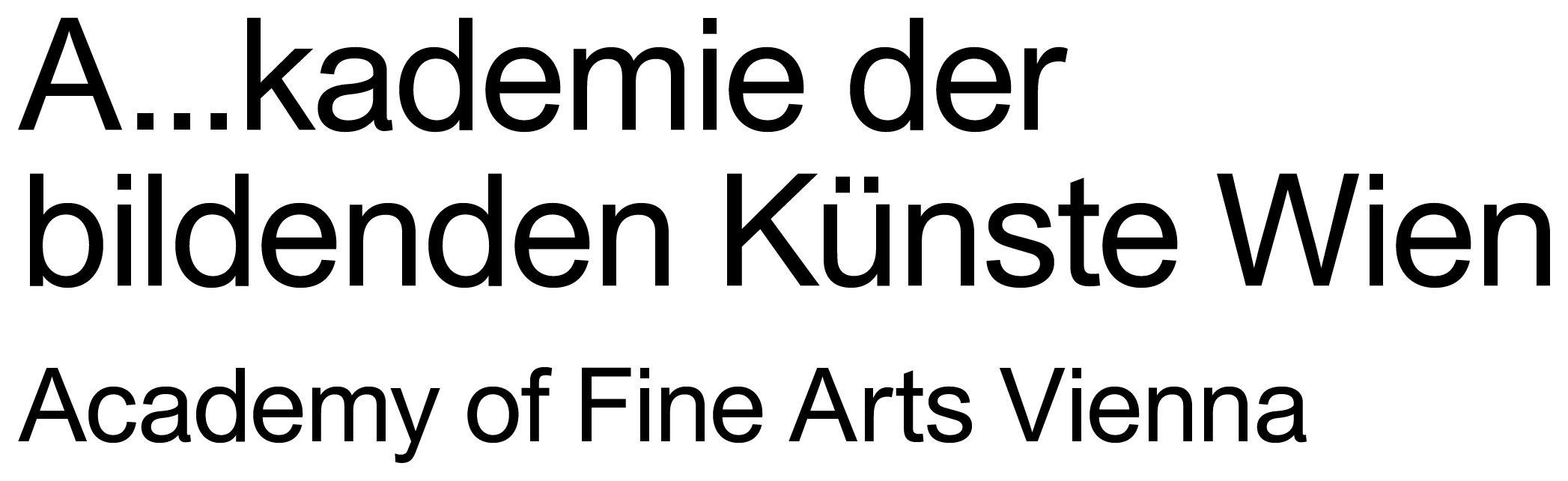
- Type: Public
- Established: 1692; 334 years ago
- Rector: Johan Frederik Hartle
- Students: 1,698 (2025)
- Location: Vienna, Austria
- Website: akbild.ac.at

The Academy of Fine Arts Vienna (German: Akademie der bildenden Künste Wien) is a public art school in Vienna, Austria. Founded in 1688 as a private academy, it is now a public university with more than 1,500 students and six institutes. Its main building on Vienna's Schillerplatz near the Ringstraße boulevard was planned by Theophil Hansen and inaugurated in 1877. The academy houses an expansive art collection that includes The Last Judgement triptych by Hieronymus Bosch, and is open to the public.

== History ==
=== Founding and 18th century ===
The Academy of Fine Arts in Vienna was founded in 1688 as a private academy modelled on the Accademia di San Luca and the Parisian Académie de peinture et de sculpture by the court-painter Peter Strudel, who became the Praefectus Academiae Nostrae. In 1701, he was ennobled by Emperor Joseph I as Freiherr (Baron) of the Holy Roman Empire. With his death in 1714, the academy temporarily closed.

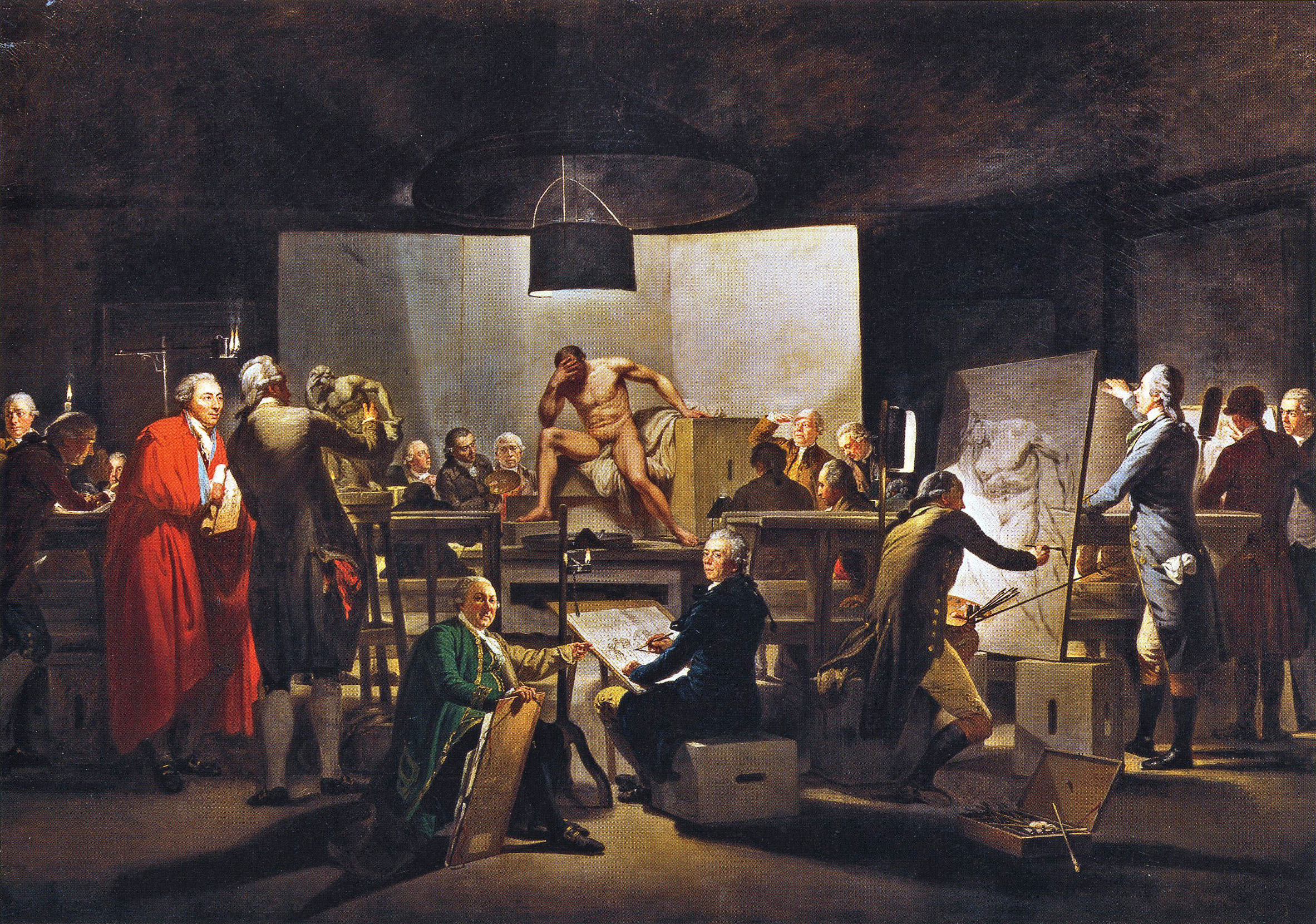
Life drawing room at the Vienna academy, Martin Ferdinand Quadal, 1787

On 20 January 1725, Emperor Charles VI appointed the Frenchman Jacob van Schuppen as Prefect and Director of the academy, which was refounded as the k.k. Hofakademie der Maler, Bildhauer und Baukunst (German for 'Imperial and Royal Court Academy of painters, sculptors and architecture'). Upon Charles's death in 1740, the academy at first declined, however during the rule of his daughter Empress Maria Theresa, a new statute reformed the academy in 1751. The prestige of the academy grew during the deanships of Michelangelo Unterberger and Paul Troger, and in 1767 the archduchesses Maria Anna and Maria Carolina were made the first Honorary Members.

Maria Carolina and Marie Antoinette's childhood art teacher, the pastel artist Gabrielle Bertrand, was accepted as a full member in 1771 as one of the few women to do so. In 1772, there were further reforms to the organisational structure. In 1776, the engraver Jakob Matthias Schmutzer founded a school of engraving. This Imperial-Royal Academy of Engraving in the Annagasse soon competed with the Court Academy.

=== 19th century ===
Chancellor Wenzel Anton Kaunitz integrated all existing art academies into the k.k. Akademie der vereinigten bildenden Künste (German for 'Imperial and Royal Academy of Unified Fine Arts') . The word "vereinigten" (unified) was later dropped. In 1822 the art cabinet grew significantly with the bequest of honorary member Anton Franz de Paula Graf Lamberg-Sprinzenstein. His collection still forms the backbone of the art on display.

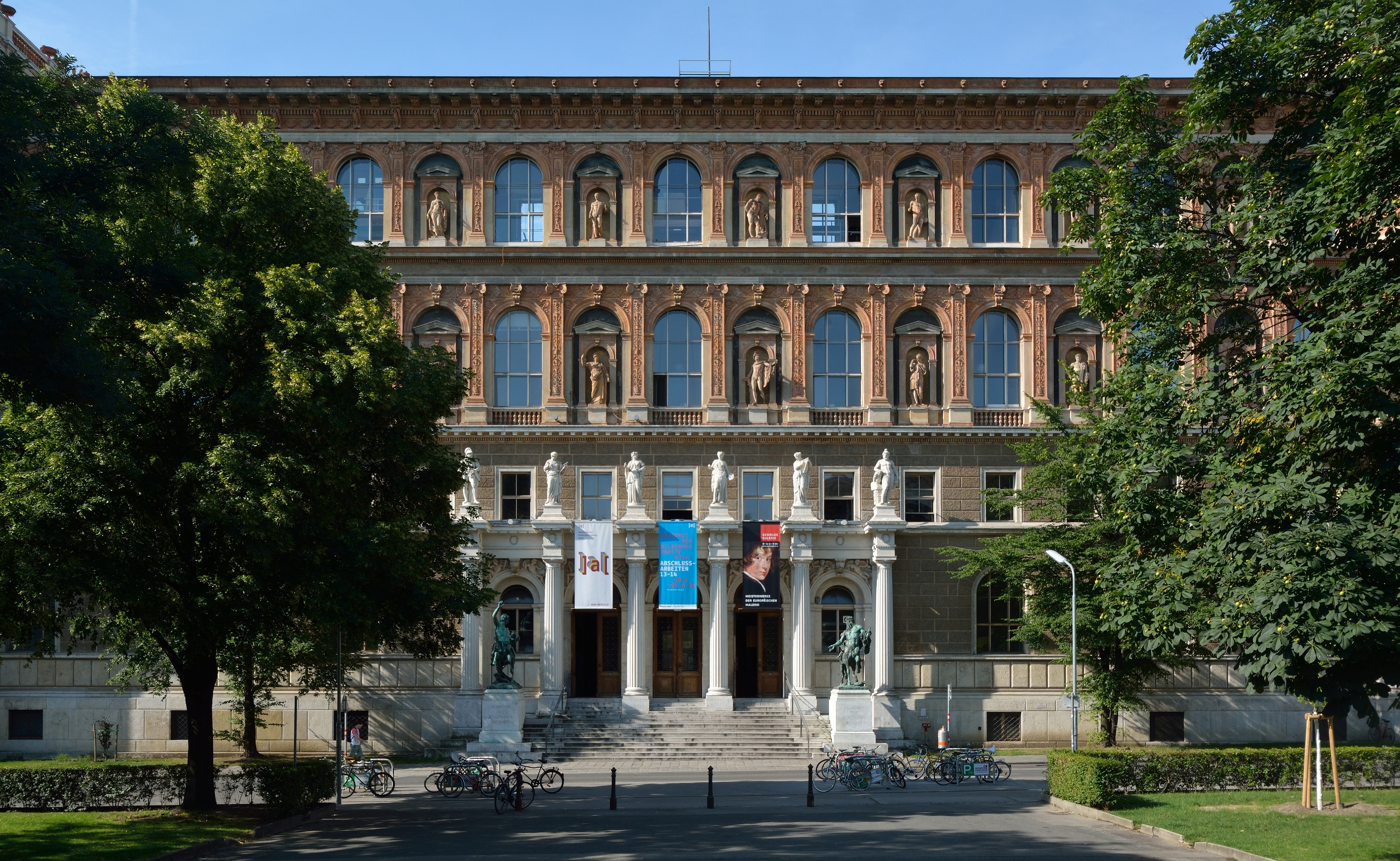
Main entrance on Schillerplatz

In 1872, Emperor Franz Joseph I of Austria approved a statute making the academy the supreme government authority for the arts. A new building was constructed according to plans designed by Theophil Hansen in the course of the layout of the Ringstraße boulevard. On 3 April 1877, the present-day building on Schillerplatz in the Innere Stadt district was inaugurated; the interior works, including ceiling frescos by Anselm Feuerbach, continued until completion in 1892.

=== 20th century ===
In 1907 and 1908, young Adolf Hitler, who had come from Linz, was twice denied admission to the drawing class by academy professor Christian Griepenkerl.

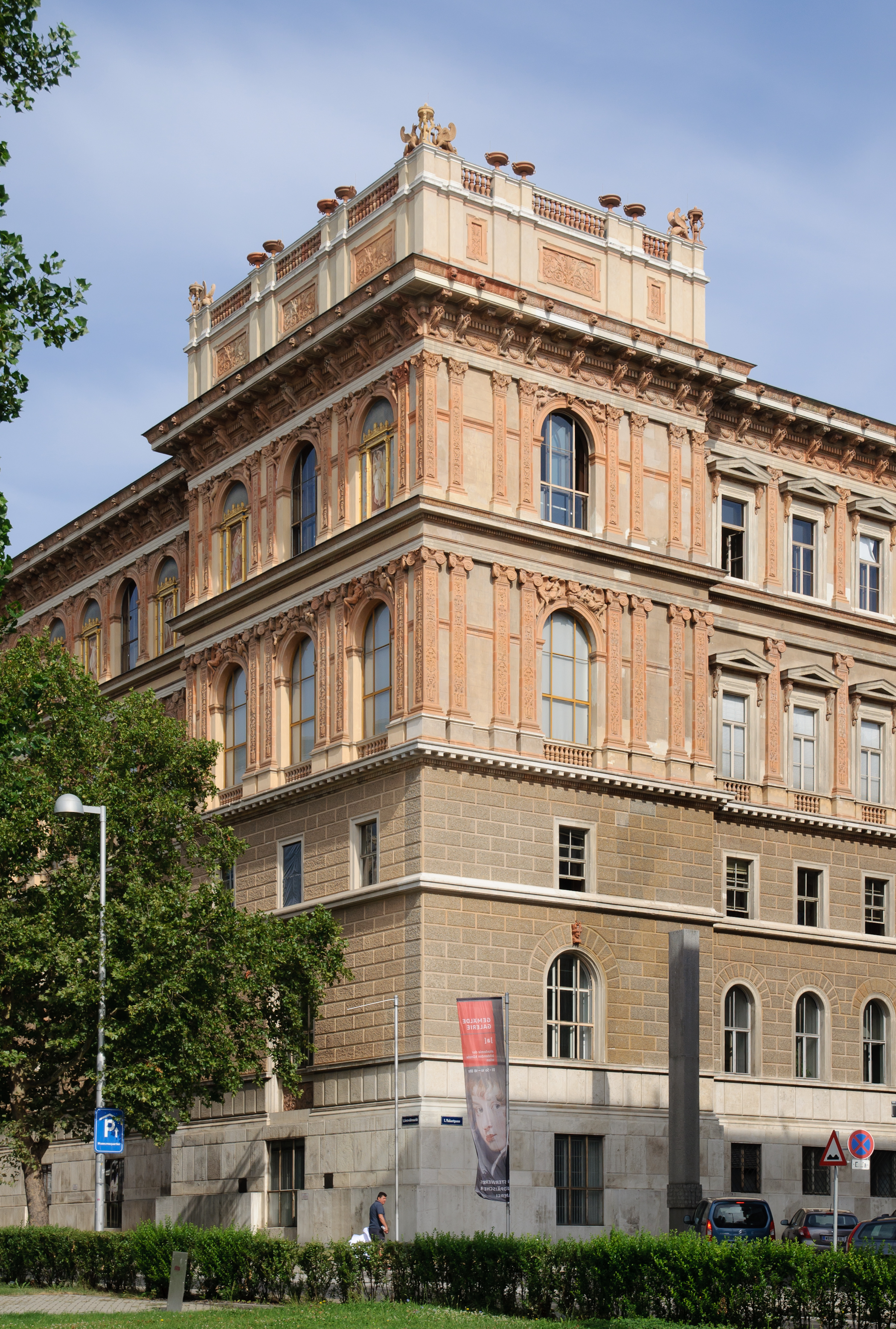
Fragment of the main building of the Academy of Fine Arts in Vienna

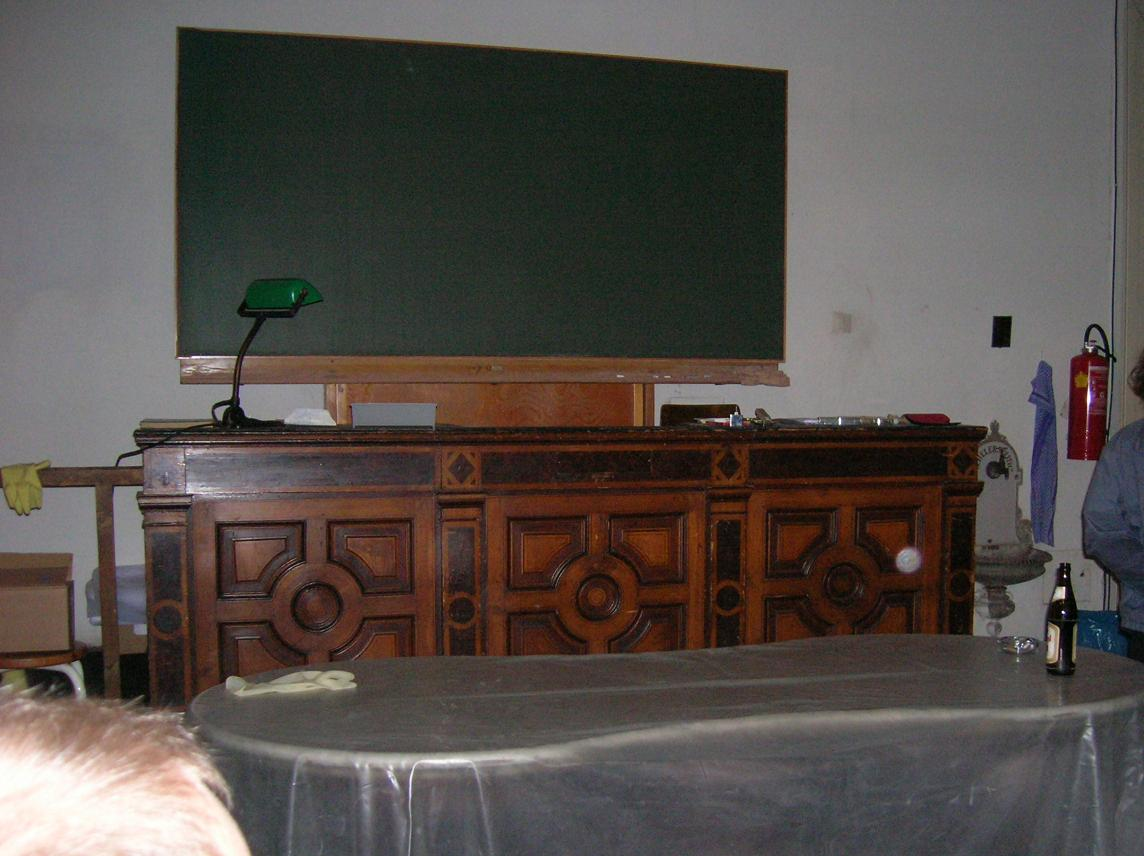
Anatomical room of the Akademie

During the Austrian Anschluss to Nazi Germany from 1938 to 1945, the academy, like other Austrian universities, was forced to purge its staff and student body of Jews and others who fell under the purview of the racially discriminatory Nuremberg Laws. After World War II, the academy was reconstituted in 1955 and its autonomy reconfirmed. Eduard von Josch, the secretary of the academy, was dismissed for being a member of the Nazi Party.

Women were officially admitted to study at the academy for the first time in the winter semester of 1920/1921. Before that, there had already been a few female students in the 18th and early 19th century, but not after 1820. In 1947, Gerda Matejka-Felden was appointed as the first female professor in the academy's history.

The academy has had university status since 1998, but retained its original name. It is currently the only Austrian university without the word "university" in its name.

=== 21st century ===
In 2011, Eva Blimlinger was elected as the first female rector of the academy. Together with the vice-rectors Andrea B. Braidt and Karin Riegler, she formed the first all-female rectorate at an Austrian university, which was in office for two terms until 2019.

The German philosopher and art historian Johan Frederik Hartle succeeded Blimlinger as rector of the academy on 1 October 2019.

In 2026, the academy was ranked 26th among the 50 best universities in art and design according to the QS World University Rankings by subject.

== Structure ==
=== Institutes ===
The academy is divided into the following institutes:

- Institute for Fine Arts, which is structured according to four categorial prerequisites in artistic creation: Art and Time, Art and Space, Art and Image, as well as Art and Intervention;
- Institute for Art Theory and Cultural Studies;
- Institute for Conservation - Restoration;
- Institute of Natural Sciences and Technology in the Arts;
- Institute for Education in the Arts;
- Institute for Art and Architecture.

In 2025, the academy had 1,698 students, 56% of whom are international students.

=== Exhibition spaces and collections ===
The academy's historic art collections are open to the public in the form of a study hall and museum. They consist of the Paintings Gallery, the Graphic Collection and the Plaster Cast Collection. In total, they house approximately 1,200 paintings, more than 100,000 works on paper and about 450 plaster casts. A selection can also be accessed online.

- Paintings Gallery: The Paintings Gallery in the academy is home to one of Austria's most important collections of Old Masters and works from the Middle Ages to the 21st century. It holds The Last Judgement triptych by Hieronymus Bosch and masterpieces by artists such as Cranach the Elder, Titian, Rubens, Rembrandt and Guardi.
- Graphic Collection: With 40,000 drawings, 25,000 photographs and 38,000 prints, the academy's Graphic Collection is one of the most important graphic collections in Austria.
- Plaster Cast Collection: Set up for study purposes, the academy's Plaster Cast Collection was founded in the late 17th century and expanded around 1800. Today, roughly 450 plaster casts are preserved, among them casts of the Capitoline Venus after Praxiteles, the Medusa Rondanini, and Michelangelo's Pietà.

In addition to its art collections, there are three contemporary exhibition spaces at the Academy of Fine Arts Vienna:

- Exhibit Gallery, a space for graduation presentations and contemporary art exhibitions that emerge from teaching at the academy or involve contemporary academic art production;
- Exhibit Studio, allocated to students of the academy;
- Exhibit Eschenbachgasse, a project space for collaborations, experimentation, expanded teaching and research practice.

The academy's university library houses about 110,000 volumes and its university archives hold administrative documents such as student registers and administration files from 1726 onwards.

== Notable alumni ==
- Maria Anwander – Austrian conceptual artist
- Alois Arnegger – Austrian painter
- Joannis Avramidis – Greek-Austrian artist (1922–2016)
- William Berczy – Canadian pioneer and painter (1744–1813)
- Amoako Boafo – Ghanaian painter
- Bernhard Cella – Austrian artist and curator
- Georg Decker – Austro-Hungarian portrait artist (1818–1894)
- Ludwig Deutsch – Austrian orientalist painter
- Naomi Devil – Hungarian painter, graphic designer (born 1987)
- Helmut Ditsch – Argentine painter
- Karl Duldig – Austrian-born Australian sculptor (1902–1986)
- Slawa Duldig – Inventor, artist, interior designer, teacher (1901–1975)
- George Dury – Bavarian-American painter
- Antonín Engel – Czech architect (1879–1958)
- Manfred Erjautz – Austrian artist (born 1966)
- Joseph Fleck – American painter
- Richard Gach – Austrian architect and artist (1930–1991)
- Victor Gruen – Austrian-American architect (1903–1980)
- Sigurður Guðjónsson – Icelandic contemporary artist (born 1975)
- Helmuth Gräff – Austrian painter (born 1958)
- Alice Berger Hammerschlag – Austrian artist (1917–1969)
- Cecil van Haanen – Dutch painter (1844–1914)
- Gottfried Helnwein – Austrian–Irish visual artist (born 1948)
- Wolfgang Hollegha – Austrian painter (1929–2023)
- Hans Hollein – Austrian architect and designer (1934–2014)
- Alfred Hrdlička – Austrian sculptor (1928–2009)
- Cornelia James – British glovemaker and businesswoman (1917–1999)
- Paja Jovanović – Serbian painter (1859–1957)
- Eszter Katalin – Hungarian artist (born 1991)
- Hermine Lang-Laris – Austrian painter (1842–1913)
- Gottfried Lindauer – Czech and New Zealand artist
- Franz Xaver Messerschmidt – German sculptor (1736–1783)
- Vera Nedkova – Bulgarian modernist painter (1906–1996)
- Ernst Plischke – Austrian-New Zealand modernist architect (1903–1992)
- Uroš Predić – Serbian artist (1857–1953)
- Heinrich Rauchinger – Austrian painter (1858–1942)
- Constantin Daniel Rosenthal – Austrian painter (1820–1851)
- Ara Sargsyan – Soviet Armenian sculptor (1902–1969)
- Egon Schiele – Austrian painter (1890–1918)
- Rudolph Michael Schindler – American architect
- Othmar Schimkowitz – Austrian architectural sculptor (1864–1947)
- Frigyes Schulek – Hungarian architect (1841–1919)
- Theodor Sockl – Austrian painter (1815–1861)
- Willi Soukop – Austrian sculptor (1907–1995)
- Hito Steyerl – German filmmaker (born 1966)
- Katrin Lea Tag – German costume and scenic designer
- Otto Wagner – Austrian architect (1841–1918)
- Jacob Weidenmann – Swiss landscape architect (1829–1893)
- Erwin Wurm – Austrian artist (born 1954)
- Bruno Zach – Austrian art deco sculptor (1891–1935)

=== Other students and professors ===
- Karl Aigen (1684–1762), student, director and professor
- Oz Almog, (born 1956)
- Alois Arnegger (1879–1963)
- Joannis Avramidis (1922–2016)
- Peter Behrens (1868–1940)
- Sabeth Buchmann (born 1962)
- Menci Clement Crnčić (1865–1930)
- Konstantin Danil (1802–1873)
- Saeed Danosian (1979–1985)
- Diedrich Diederichsen (born 1957)
- Andrea Maria Dusl (born 1961)
- Thomas Ender (1793–1875)
- Harun Farocki (1944–2014)
- Anselm Feuerbach (1829–1880), professor (1873)
- Emil Fuchs (1866–1929)
- Ernst Fuchs (1930–2015)
- Peter Johann Nepomuk Geiger (1805–1880), professor
- Richard Gerstl (1883–1908)
- Edwin Grienauer (1893–1964)
- Gottfried Helnwein (born 1948)
- F. Scott Hess (born 1955)
- Clemens Holzmeister (1886–1983)
- Friedensreich Hundertwasser (1928–2000)
- Li Hua – Chinese painter (born 1980)
- Greta Kempton (1901–1991)
- Anton Lehmden (1929–2018)
- Maximilian Liebenwein (1869–1926)
- Leopold Matzal (1890–1956)
- Franz Anton Maulbertsch (1724–1796)
- Ludwig Merwart (1913–1979)
- Joseph Mössmer (1780–1845)
- Caspar Neher (1897–1962)
- Gustav Peichl (1928–2019)
- Elmar Peintner (born 1954)
- August von Pettenkofen (1822–1889)
- Johann Georg Platzer (1704–1761)
- Roland Rainer (1910–2004)
- Daniel Richter (born 1962)
- Ferdinand Schebek (1875–1949)
- Rudolph Schwarz (1840–1912)
- Robert Sedlacek (1881–1957)
- Nasrine Seraji (born 1957)
- Tamuna Sirbiladze (1971–2016)
- Hito Steyerl (born 1966)
- Paul Troger (1698–1762)
- Norbert Troller (1900–1984))
- Rudolf von Alt (1812–1905)
- Friedrich von Schmidt (1825–1891)
- Henrik Weber (1818–1866)
- Kurt Weiss (1895–1966)
- Albert Zimmermann (1808–1888)
- Timo Penttilä (1931–2011)
- Herbert Smagon (1927–2007)
- Jan Styka (1858–1925)
