= Gerda Matejka-Felden =

Austrian painter (1901–1984)

- Born: Gerda Felden; 29 April 1901; Dehlingen, Alsace, Germany.
- Died: 27 December 1984 (aged 83); Vienna, Austria
- Education: Worpswede; Fine Arts Academy Leipzig
- Occupations: Artist; Commercial artists Art teacher and pioneer of adult education
- Spouse(s): 1. Karl Ludwig Kossak (1891-1949); 2. Viktor Matejka (1901-1993)
- Parents: Emil Felden (1874-1959) (father); Gerda _____ (mother)

Gerda Matejka-Felden (29 April 1901 – 27 December 1984) was an Austrian painter and art teacher.

== Life and works ==
=== Provenance and early years ===
Gerda Felden was born at Dehlingen, a small village on the northern edge of Alsace, which between 1871 and 1919 was a semi-detached province of Germany. Emil Felden (1874-1959), her father, was a Protestant pastor-theologian who had been at school with Albert Schweitzer. Commentators suspect that it may have been on account of Schweitzer's friendship and influence that after his daughter grew to adulthood, and in the immediate aftermath of the war, Emil Felden entered mainstream politics committed to social democracy and pacifism. Gerda Felden's mother, also called Gerda, was a product of the Prussian landed aristocracy. Gerda was the eldest of her parents’ four recorded children. When she was 7 Gerda's family relocated to Bremen in connection with her father's church work. She was enrolled at an all-girls secondary school in Bremen and two years later, aged 11, began to receive supplementary drawing lessons privately, with the support and encouragement of her mother. A couple of years later, aged 13, she was enrolled at the “Kunstgewerbeschule” (loosely, “College of Applied Arts”) in Bremen in 1914. In 1917, having apparently completed her courses, and still aged just 16, she stayed on for another year as a teaching assistant in the drawing classes. In 1918 she accepted the offer of a bursary from the city of Bremen enabling her to spend a year studying at the Artists’ School in the Worpswede flatlands to the north of the city. She then studied at the Fine Arts Academy in Leipzig, on the other side of the country, between 1919 and 1924.

=== Vienna ===
In 1924 Gerda Felden moved to Vienna, marrying the author Karl Ludwig Kossak. In Vienna she worked as a graphic artist-designer, producing drawing for Das Kleine Blatt and other newspapers and magazines along with book covers, notably for Ullstein Verlag, and posters. There are also portraits and water colours that she produced dating from this period. The marriage to Kossak ended in divorce after seven years.

=== Viktor Matejka ===
On 23 June 1932 Gerda Felden married, as her second husband, the Viennese politician-writer Viktor Matejka, a man of strong views and principles who later came to prominence as a committed antifascist. He was also a Roman Catholic, and the divorced daughter of a Protestant pastor in Bremen now converted to Catholicism in order to facilitate their union, solemnised in a church ceremony on 23 June 1932. Through her new husband she acquired a new commitment to “popular education”, and during the 1930s she began to deliver courses in drawing and painting at a number of Vienna's adult education institutions, with a particular focus on teaching the unemployed and otherwise dispossessed. Naturally one of the education establishments at which she taught was her husband's Volkshochschule Ottakring (Adult Education Center).

=== Under National Socialism ===
Across Europe the 1930s were an exceptionally threatening decade. After several years of instability which at times spilled bloodily onto the streets, Austria became a one-party dictatorship in 1934, and although the slide towards tyranny was less abrupt than in Germany, the political direction of travel was the same as in Germany. Them, in March 1938, Austria was integrated into an enlarged version of Germany. For many in Vienna the changes came progressively over several years, but for Gerda Matejka-Felden the changes were immediate and brutal. The northerners had arrived with a list: Viktor Matejka's name was on it. He was arrested on 12 March 1938 and, on 1 April 1938, delivered to the Dachau concentration camp which had opened just outside Munich a few years earlier to hold political prisoners. Following her husband's arrest, Matejka-Felden was served with a ”Berufsverbot” (government ban on professional work), which in terms of her qualifications and professional experience rendered her unemployable. She lived on cash remittances from her father and devoted her energies to trying to secure her husband's release. During 1939 undertook several visits to Berlin in pursuit of this objective. She failed to secure her husband's release, but did eventually acquire from the authorities a permit to visit him at the camp which was, under the circumstances, a significant achievement.

=== Aftermath of war ===
In 1943, still able to visit her husband at Camp Dachau, Matejka told her of the increasingly dire shortages affecting inmates, and she was able to arrange for supplies of food and medicines to be sent in. On 7 July 1944 Viktor Matejka was released from the concentration camp. It is possible that this was a reaction to the desperate shortage of manpower that the state was by this time facing on account of the slaughter of war. Matejka managed to get himself admitted to hospital as a patient in order to avoid immediate conscription, and during the next ten months he managed to stay out of the army using a succession of medical certificates, some of them issued by doctors and others of them simple forgeries. For Vienna, war ended in the early summer of 1945, with US, French and British forces arriving from the west and the Red army from the east. For ten years, till 1955, the city was divided into occupation zones under military administration by one of the four formerly allied powers in question, while governments in Washington, Moscow and London failed to reach agreement over spheres of future influence. While her husband embarked on a successful political career at the interface between the arts and city politics, Gerda Matejka-Felden accepted a teaching post with the “masters school for arts education” at the Academy of Fine Arts on the Schillerplatz. Two years later, having taken over leadership of the “masters school”, a measure of acceptance was marked by the conferring on her of an extraordinary professorship. Twenty-five years after the still "traditionalist" academy had admitted its first female students, Matejka-Felden's professorship was a significant milestone: she was the first female professor appointed.

On 5 May 1948 the marriage of Gerda Matejka-Felden and Viktor Matejka ended in divorce, though the two remained in frequent contact and close relations were sustained till they were more completely separated by death in 1984. Initially they continued to live together in their apartment, though some years after the separation Gerda moved out to live in her own apartment in Vienna-Döbling.

=== Adult art education: “Verein Künstlerische Volkshochschule” ===
In 1946/47 Matejka-Felden teamed up with Karl Lugmayer and Leopold Langhammer to found her “Verein Künstlerische Volkshochschule” (Peoples’ Arts Academy) which, following a period of growth, she would relaunch in 1954 as the ”Wiener Kunstschule“ (‘’”Vienna College of Arts”’’). The launch of what became the main academy, less than two years after the end of the war triggered intense indignation and resistance among members of the city’s (largely self-defined) arts elite, not leastly because Matejka-Felden initially installed the academy in the basement of the Academy of Fine Arts at which she was employed. Conservatives identified in one source as “bureaucratic culture monopolists” launched disciplinary proceedings against her in 1949, and she faced a teaching ban at Fine Arts Academy the till 1951. Gerda Matejka-Felden's commitment to broadly based further education proved non-negotiable, however. She fought back, determined to provide the necessary artistic education to those who deserved it, based on merit, whom the official examination board of the time would have denied the appropriate study opportunities. With Vienna split into differently controlled sectors, each under foreign military occupation, and the mayoral office under the political direction of the socialist Theodor Körner, opponents were unable to thwart Matejka-Felden's commitment to adult arts education.

After she resumed teaching at the fine Arts Academy in 1951, Gerda Matejka-Felden soon became the recipient of several public honours and other marks of recognition. In 1956 she received the Ministerial Prize for Popular Education and Training. She had already, in 1954, accepted an invitation from the French Minister of Education to deliver a series of lectures at the Paris National Institute. In 1959 President Schärf nominated her to an ordinary (full) professorship. In 1960 she travelled to Moscow, at the invitation of a section of corresponding members of the Soviet Academy of Pedagogical Sciences, in order to deliver a series of lectures on modern arts teaching and adult education in Austria. Closer to home, however, resentment continued to simmer undimmed among the arts elite at the Academy of Fine Arts. Her applications to take leave in order to accept education-related engagements at other institutions were regularly rejected by the rector with the justification that her invitations came not from her work for the Fine Arts Academy but on account of her “community college activities”.

=== Later years ===
In 1962 Matejka-Felden staged an exhibition of her own paintings in Bremen, The next year the ”Wiener Kunstschule” (as the “Verein Künstlerische Volkshochschule” had been renamed in 1954) finally relocated to a new site in Vienna-Alsergrund, leaving the basement rooms at the Academy of Fine Arts, unencumbered by her class rooms, and freed up for a return to their former uses.

=== Recognition and celebration ===
On the occasion of her sixty-fifth birthday two exhibitions were staged at the Vienna Künstlerhaus exhibition space. One featured paintings by Gerda Matejka-Felden: the other featured paintings by students and former students of her ”Wiener Kunstschule“ (‘’”Vienna College of Arts”’’).

In 1967 she received the Decoration of Honour for Services to the Republic of Austria in gold.

In 1972 she receiver the Great Decoration of Honour from the city and state of Vienna.
