= Walter Ferber =

German journalist (1907–1996

- Born: 24 December 1907; Gelsenkirchen, German Empire
- Died: 13 April 1996 (aged 88); Lungern, Switzerland

Walter Ferber (24 December 1907 – 13 April 1996) was a German opinion journalist. He advocated a Christianity-influenced federalism and was committed to the reconstruction of the German Centre Party after the Second World War. Ferber understood federalism to be a universal social principle that applied to all areas of human community life.

== Life and career ==
Ferber was born in Erle (nowadays a district of Gelsenkirchen) as the ninth of 14 children of the miner Franz Ferber (1872–1950) and the seamstress Maria Ferber, née Weimer (1874–1952). He attended elementary school and a secondary school from 1914 to 1924, which he left to begin a commercial apprenticeship. In his free time he joined the "Ruhr Chaplain" Carl Klinkhammer and the federalist Benedikt Schmittmann and appeared at Center Party meetings from 1925 to 1926. After his apprenticeship he went on a journey and worked, among other places, in a ball bearing factory in Schweinfurt. At the same time, he continued his autodidactical education in history, sociology, pedagogy and political science, spending most of his winters in Berlin, where he also came into contact with Eduard Spranger.

In 1932 Ferber emigrated to Austria, where he worked in Vienna as a features editor of the trade union newspaper Die neue Zeitung under Eugen Kogon. As early as 1933 he wrote to Hans Schmitz (1897–1970), the brother of Richard Schmitz, among other things: "There will be a collapse in Hitler's Germany." Due to differences over the political orientation of the newspaper, Ferber left the editorial team and lived as a freelance journalist. He published regularly in the weekly magazine Der christliche Ständestaat under Dietrich von Hildebrand and was a member of the Studienrunde katholischer Soziologen under the leadership of Ernst Karl Winter.

After the "Anschluss of Austria" on March 11, 1938, Ferber was to be taken into protective custody. He fled, but was unable to cross the Czechoslovak border. Back in Vienna, he was arrested, taken to a prison and sent to the Dachau concentration camp on June 17, 1938, with the number 690. On September 27, 1939, Ferber was transferred to the Flossenbürg concentration camp, from where he was brought back to Dachau on March 2, 1940. In Dachau he was housed in the "Austrian block" together with, among others, Leopold Figl, Alfons Gorbach, Alfred Maleta and Viktor Matejka, but was also in contact with the clergy who had been brought together in Dachau from all concentration camps since the beginning of 1940.

On October 24, 1942, Ferber was released from the Dachau concentration camp and transferred to the 19th Infantry Replacement Battalion, a probationary unit of the German Wehrmacht. Upon his release, the clergy asked him to "try everything to get abroad and inform influential Catholic circles about their situation." During transport to North Africa, where this unit was to be used for mine clearance, Ferber managed to escape to nearby Switzerland near Héricourt in France, and crossed the Swiss border near Boncourt on 25 November 1942. As early as December 1942, he informed the then Apostolic Nuncio in Switzerland, Filippo Bernardini, about the situation of the clergy imprisoned in Dachau, who forwarded the report to the Secretary of State Luigi Maglione on 28 December 1942. Maglione replied to Bernardini in detail on 22 January 1943. This letter states, among other things, that the Holy Father had been informed about the situation of the clergy in the concentration camps since 1940, but considered effective intervention to be almost impossible. However, Maglione assured that if any opportunity for effective intervention arose, it would not be abandoned. Ferber then informed the Swiss public through an anonymous report "From a German concentration camp" in the Apologetic Papers (Zurich, April 20, 1943): "In the camp [Dachau] there are currently about 3,000 clergy, about 2,000 Poles, 400 Reich Germans and 600 members of other nations. [...] Last year about 1,500 Polish clergy starved to death" (p. 95). "Medical experiments for the Air Force and submarine fleet are still being carried out on Dachau prisoners. [...] However, so far only a few – and only Polish – clergy have been called upon to take part in the experiments" (p. 96).

Since the Police Division of the Federal Department of Justice and Police, based on a statement by Dr. H. v. Segesser (1908–1983), who was in charge of the interrogation, judged Ferber's deportation to be "not feasible at the moment", he was interned in the Lindenhof internment camp in Witzwil and then in Murimoos, canton of Aargau. Through the mediation of university professor P. Wilhelm Schmitt, he was privately interned in Fribourg in Üechtland in August 1943, where he prepared the re-foundation of the Centre Party. In 1945, under the pseudonym Walter Feuerbach, he published the report 55 Months in Dachau about his time in the concentration camp with the Rex publishing house in Lucerne. The publication required a letter of approval dated 28 April 1945 from Federal Councillor Philipp Etter to the head of the police division of the Federal Department of Justice and Police. After the "Press and Radio" department on May 9, 1945, and the Swiss Federal Prosecutor's Office on May 14, 1945, had raised no objections "for reasons of political police," the head of the police department granted the Rex publishing house permission to print on May 23, 1945.

After the end of the Second World War, Ferber initially became the first editor-in-chief of the monthly magazine Neues Abendland in Augsburg, published by the publisher Johann Wilhelm Naumann. He also took on a teaching position in political science at the Theologische Hochschule in Dillingen an der Donau. In the summer of 1946, he moved to the French occupation zone, where he hoped to be able to edit a federalist newspaper. Due to the restrictive paper allocation, this project did not come to fruition. Ferber found employment at the Schwarzwälder Post. From 1948 to 1950 he published the Föderalistische Hefte, which he founded, in which classics of federalism such as Constantin Frantz as well as well-known federalist-minded personalities of the post-war period, including the widow of Benedikt Schmittmann, Helene (Ella) Schmittmann-Wahlen, were given a voice. From 1950 to 1953 he worked as a freelance journalist in Germany. However, Ferber failed in his aim of establishing a federalist party, most recently in 1955 with the founding of the Bundle of Determined Federalists, as the CDU and SPD prevailed in the Federal Republic of Germany and the former Centre Party largely merged into the CDU.

== Later life ==
In 1953, Ferber, who had been married to a Swiss woman since 1947, moved from Singen to Lucerne in Switzerland. Here he concentrated on his journalistic work, particularly on the prehistory of National Socialism in Austria and the history of German reform Catholicism. Among other things, he published The Prehistory of the N. S. D. A. P. in Austria, in which he proved, contrary to a misunderstanding exonerating Germany, that National Socialism was not originally an Austrian phenomenon, but had been exported from Germany to Austria at an early stage. From 1957 onwards he lived in Sachseln. His son Rafael Ferber is professor emeritus of philosophy at the University of Lucerne and titular professor at the University of Zurich, his son Christoph Ferber is a translator and literary scholar. On 13 April 1996, Ferber died at the age of 88.

== Citations and bibliography ==
- Als Walter Feuerbach: 55 Monate Dachau. Ein Tatsachenbericht. 1. und 2. Auflage. Rex-Verlag, Luzern 1945. Nachdruck mit Vorwort von Barbara Distel: 55 Monate Dachau. Ein Tatsachenbericht. Donat, Bremen 1993, ISBN 3-924444-28-5.
- Als Walter Feuerbach: Grosspreussen oder Deutscher Bund? Ein Beitrag zur Umerziehung der deutschen Katholiken. Paulusdruckerei, Freiburg [i.Üe.] 1945.
- Der Föderalismus. 1. Auflage in: Abendländische Reihe 5, Naumann, Augsburg 1946, 2., erweiterte Auflage ebd. 1948.
- Die Vorgeschichte der N. S. D. A. P. in Österreich. Ein Beitrag zur Geschichtsrevision. Merk, Konstanz 1954.
- Konstanz, Merk (1955). Geist und Politik in Österreich. Die Intelligenz und der Nationalsozialismus vor dem Anschluß.
- Kleine Geschichte der katholischen Bewegung. Echter Verlag, Würzburg 1959.
- Ludwig Windthorst. Der große deutsche Katholikenführer. 1. Auflage. Winfried-Werk, Augsburg 1962.
- Deutsche Reformkatholiken. Zürich 1980.
- Föderalistische Hefte. 1948–1950; eine Auswahl, herausgegeben, eingeleitet und mit einem Anhang versehen von J. Ch. Traut und Tonio Gas. 1. Auflage. Nomos-Verl.-Ges, Baden-Baden 1996, ISBN 3-7890-4549-7.
- Ferber, Rafael (1997). Aufrechter Gang. Leben und Werk des Föderalismustheoretikers Walter Ferber (1907–1996) (in German). Vol. 77. p. 31. doi:10.5169/seals-165747 – via Schweizer Monatshefte.
- Ferber, Rafael (2022). Pius XII. und die Geistlichen im KZ Dachau (PDF) (in German). pp. 52–53. doi:10.5167/uzh-215750 – via Schweizerische Kirchenzeitung.
- Klöckler, Jürgen (1998). Abendland – Alpenland – Alemannien: Frankreich und die Neugliederungsdiskussion in Südwestdeutschland 1945–1947 (in German). Oldenbourg, München. ISBN 3-486-56345-9.
