= Austrian Cultural Forum New York =

Cultural center in New York City

Coordinates: 40°45′34″N 73°58′31″W

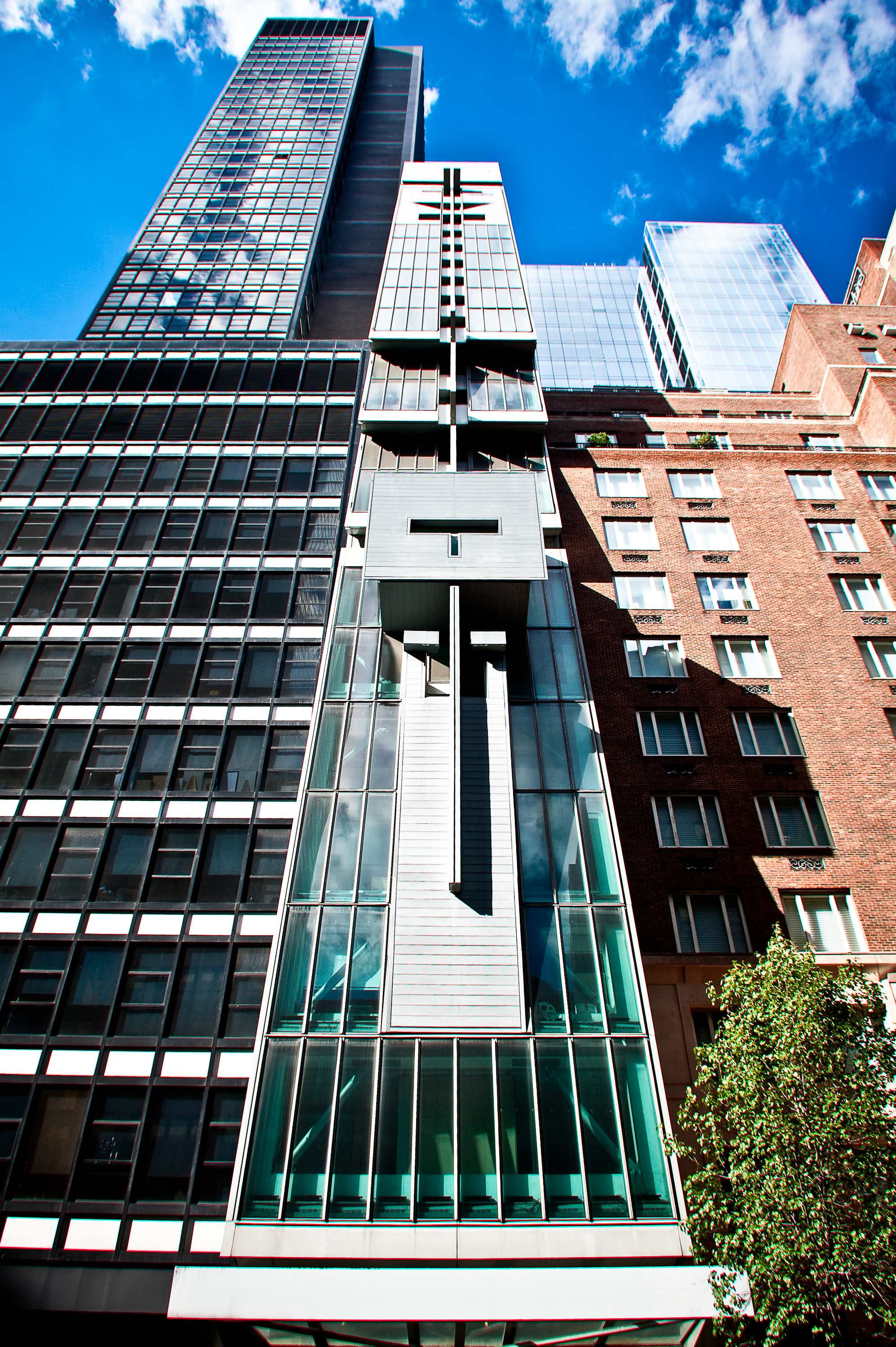
- Established: 1942
- Location: 11 East 52nd Street, Manhattan, New York, United States
- Director: Susanne Keppler-Schlesinger
- Website: www.acfny.org

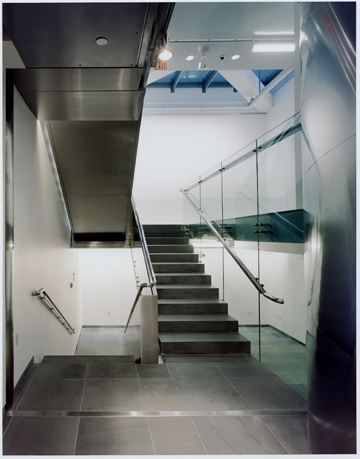
Staircases and gallery

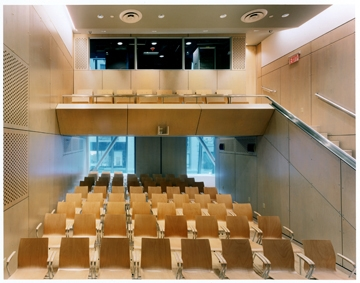
One of the rooms used for concerts and events

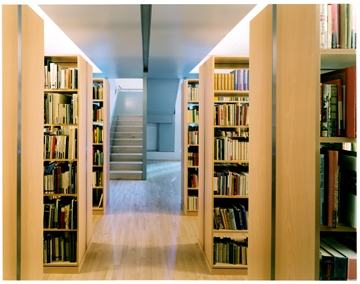
Library on levels 4 and 5

The Austrian Cultural Forum New York (ACFNY) is one of Austria's two cultural representation offices in the United States; the other is in Washington, D.C. It is part of the worldwide network of Austrian Cultural Forums overseen by the Austrian Federal Ministry for European and International Affairs.

== History ==
ACFNY was founded as the Austrian Institute in 1942 in New York City by Austrian immigrants to the United States for the purpose of preserving and disseminating Austrian culture. One of the leading figures of that time was émigré Irene Harand, who served as the institute's vice president, who offered particulalry jewisch Asutrian writers and artists a platform abroad, and had already previously 1939 founded with Ernst Karl Winter the first Austrian émigré organization, the Austrian American Center.

In 1963, it opened offices at its current location at 11 East 52nd Street in Manhattan, as the official cultural representation office of the Austrian federal government. In 2002, the institution, now called the Austrian Cultural Forum, moved into a new building at the location of its former townhouse.

ACFNY is a division of the Austrian consulate in New York. Susanne Keppler-Schlesinger has held the position of Director of the Austrian Cultural Forum New York since September 2022. She is an Austrian career diplomat. Her predecessors include Michael Haider, Christine Moser, Andreas Stadler, Christoph Thun-Hohenstein, Wolfgang Waldner, Peter Marboe, Fritz Cocron, and Wilhelm Schlag.

== Building ==
A competition was held in 1992 to choose a design for ACFNY's new building. Raimund Abraham was the winning architect among 226 submissions. Completed in 2002, the building is situated on a plot in Manhattan that is only 24.5 feet (7.5 m) wide and 81 feet (25 m) deep. It is considered as an architectural anomaly because, despite its small footprint, it is 24 stories and 275 feet (84 m) tall. The building's facade is clad in glass and aluminum and gradually tapers to a narrow point as it slants upwards in accordance with zoning laws. It houses exhibition spaces, a theater, a library for books and audio recordings, offices, seminar and reception rooms, and apartments for the officers of the institution. The library is named in honor of Frederic Morton and has a collection of more than 10,000 books specific to Austrian art and culture.

== Activities ==
Since its founding, ACFNY has served as a place for cultural exchange between Austrians and Americans throughout the United States, with the exception of Washington D.C., which has its own cultural forum under the auspices of the Austrian Embassy. It introduces Austrian artists at venues across the country.

In the ACFNY building, five floors are used as exhibition space for predominantly contemporary art. Some exhibits make use of and showcase the building's unique architecture. Concerts and performances are presented in the in-house auditorium and at other venues in New York. In addition to films, AFCNY offers talks, readings, and book presentations.
