= Andreas Stadler =

Andreas Stadler may refer to:

- Andreas Stadler (weightlifter)
- Andreas Stadler (political scientist)
