= Li Hua (disambiguation) =

Li Hua is Chinese artist.

Li Hua may also refer to:

- Li Hua (700–766), a Tang-era essayist
- Li Hua (volleyball)
- Dragon Li, cat breed
- Li Hua (artist, born 1980)
- A placeholder name used in Gaokao in China
