= Alois Arnegger =

Austrian painter

Alois Arnegger (March 9, 1879 – August 11, 1967) was an Austrian painter.

Arnegger was born in Vienna. He studied at the Academy of Fine Arts Vienna and was taught by Robert Russ and August Eisenmenger. Alois Arnegger became famous as a scene painter.

In the first years of his career, he painted scenes from his Austrian origin, but since the 1920s his focus was more on Italian coasts, such as Naples, Capri or Sanremo.

He died in Vienna in 1967. His son Gottfried Arnegger was also a painter.
