= Maria Anwander =

Austrian conceptual artist

- Born: 1980 (age 45–46); Bregenz, Austria
- Known for: Conceptual art

Maria Anwander (born 1980) is an Austrian conceptual artist who specializes in performance and installation art. Her work has been featured in multiple solo exhibitions in Europe and the United States since 2009. Much of her work focuses on challenging art institutions and their conventions.

== Biography ==
Anwander was born in Bregenz in 1980. She studied Theater, Film, and Media Science at the University of Vienna, graduating in 2003. She earned a degree from the Academy of Fine Arts in Vienna in 2008.

In 2013, Anwander stated that "my work mainly questions authenticity of artworks and the gap between the art-market and the artist as participator." She adds that "my latest works deal with issues of collecting, ownership and authorship. Hereby I'm highly interested in the creation of notional images by removing other already existing images. The dematerialization and deconstruction of images into pure descriptions of themselves and vice versa is part of my deliberations."

Anwander currently lives and works in Berlin, Germany.

== Works ==
=== My Most Favorite Art (2004–2011) ===
Anwander created an installation of the exhibition labels she had stolen from art galleries and museums. The installation is also intended as a travel diary and Anwander states that its purpose is to give the viewer "access to my innermost, to the works accompanying my artistic career."

=== The World's Leading Art Magazine (2009–2013) ===
Anwander used tissues to remove the ink from the pages of an art magazine which purported to be the world's leading art magazine, leaving only the blank magazine and the ink from the pages on the tissues.

=== Analyzing (2010) ===
Anwander filmed a 32-minute video where she met with Adolfo Profumo, a psychoanalyst, in New York City who attempts to tell her about her personality through looking through her portfolio.

=== The Kiss (2010) ===
In 2010, Anwander entered the MoMA as a regular visitor and, unauthorized, French-kissed a wall she had chosen. She then affixed a label identical to the labels used by MoMA, explaining her rationale and explaining that she "uses art institutions as forums where hierarchical, social and economic models can be tested and reimagined. This piece is a part of a series of artworks and performances, which Anwander has developed since 2004, playing with the link between art institutions and market."

=== Public Dancefloor (2012) ===
Anwander staged an intervention in a public space where a public dance floor was installed in the middle of a public park in Innsbruck, Austria. A light switch, disco ball, loudspeaker, and lights were installed. When the light switch was pressed, lights turned on and music began to play for the duration of one song.

=== The Present (2012) ===
In 2012, Anwander staged an intervention and placed a block of limestone weighing two tons in the city centre of Luxembourg.

=== Untitled (2012), in collaboration with Ruben Aubrecht ===
Anwander and Aubrecht created a 100 x 280 cm sculpture which read, "JUST ANOTHER WORK OF ART WHICH WILL NOT GO DOWN IN HISTORY."

=== Untitled (2012), in collaboration with Ruben Aubrecht ===
In collaboration with Aubrecht, Anwander placed embroidered pillows with statistics about poverty, malnutrition or wealth distribution on couches in luxury apartments, hotel lobbies and exclusive restaurants in Mexico City. The work was intended to be a response to the "increasing development of parallel societies."
