= Saeed Danosian =

Iranian-American artist, scholar and philanthropist

Saeed Danosian (November 1, 1954, Tehran, Iran - December 21, 2008, Irvine, California) was a contemporary Iranian artist, scholar and philanthropist based in Orange County, California.

He pursued a program in interior design at the Bel Art Academy in Rome in the mid-70's, and from 1979 to 1985 studied further at the Academy of Fine Arts Vienna (Akademie der bildenden Künste Wien), earning his baccalaureate degree in set design for the theater in 1983 and his master's degree in set design and art direction in 1985. In addition to his areas of major concentration, his studies included film and television, costume design, art history, and music. He worked in the area of set design at both the Burgtheater and Wiener Staatsoper (Vienna State Opera).

He died in Irvine, California, on December 21, 2008, at the age of 54 from a sudden aortic dissection. He is buried in Pacific View Memorial Park in Corona del Mar, California.

== Education ==
- Interior Design, Bel Art Academy in Rome, Italy (1977)
- Bachelor of Fine Arts in Set Design, Academy of Fine Arts Vienna in Austria (1983)
- Master of Fine Arts in Art Direction and Set Design, Academy of Fine Arts Vienna in Austria (1985)

== Community work ==
- Founder and Publisher of OCPC Magazine (Orange County Persian Community) (2004)
- Co-Founder and Publisher of OC LIFE magazine (2008)
- Participating artist in KOCE-TV's "Butterfly Initiative Project"
- Artistic Director of Persian Mehregan Festival (90's-2000's), main stage design (2005, 2006)
- Harvest Festival (Irvine, California) Construction of a Village (1999)
- Design of 50 banners in recognition of Persian New Year hung throughout the City of Irvine, California (March 2007)

== Artistic donations ==
- WE Build program with California First Lady Maria Shriver: Constructed a playground in Long Beach, California (2007)
- 1,500 sq ft mural for Harbor Christian School in Long Beach, California (2007)
- An Evening with Senator Hillary Clinton: Presentation of a commemorative 9/11 Lady Liberty painting (2005)
- Butterfly Initiative Project, KOCE-TV: Painted 6 ft (1.8 m) Butterfly for the Art and Science Legacy Project in Orange County (2005)
- Bam Earthquake Relief Telethon, PBC TV, donation of original artwork sold for $35,000 (2004)
- Crystal Cathedral Anaheim Festival of Hope: Donation of original art pieces (2003)
- Capistrano Unified School District & Taking the Reins: Organized 300 sq ft (28 m^{2}). banner project with students (2003)
- Congressman Ed Royce: Presented with 9/11 Lady Liberty painting (August 2002)
- Republican Party, Los Angeles: September 11 Commemorative painting presented to Bill Simon
- Children's Foundation of California: Donation of posters (2001)
- Relief International Organization: Donation of Original Carving (2001)
- Rape Crisis Centers, Riverside & Los Angeles: Donation of several prints (2001 & 2002)
- Sunrise Children’s Hospital Foundation, Las Vegas: Donation of original artwork (2000)
- American Heart Association: Donation of prints and originals (1996–1998)
- Taught a series of art classes for cancer patients at St. Jude Children's Hospital
- Mission San Juan Capistrano Museum: Mural & Restoration to Father Serra Chapel (1993)
- Created a 1,200 sq ft (110 m^{2}) mural for McDonald's in Huntington Beach, California (1992)

== Awards ==
- 2007 National Faculty of the Year Award, Campus Community Service Award & South Bay Campus' Faculty of the Year Award, Westwood College.
