= Oz Almog =

Israeli artist and author

Oz Almog (Hebrew: עוז אלמוג) is an Israeli and Austrian artist, born on 15 April 1956, in Kfar Saba, Israel.

== Biography ==
Oz Almog was born to a family of Russian, Romanian and Ukrainian origins (their family last names were Avrutzki and Abramovich). After studying classical painting and completing his military service in the Israeli Navy, he studied at the Vienna Academy of Fine Arts.

== Work ==
Oz Almog's artistic work is confrontational and provocative. In the 1980s, as a student of the Academy of Fine Arts in Austria, Almog took an active part with in off-scene underground culture in Europe. In the 1990s he addressed complex issues of human sexuality, totalitarian ideologies, consumerism and terrorism. In 1994, his Birth of a Myth (German title Geburt eines Mythos) exhibition took place at WUK, an alternative arts center in Vienna. The center was converted into a shrine with flags and a flower-strewn floor. In some 70 oil paintings Almog auto-portrayed himself in the style of Nazi art, classicism and social realism as a ruler and savior, as a naked, provocatively muscle-bound godlike figure, as a fiery agitator or simply with the stern regard of a stormtrooper, complete with leather belt and jackboots.

Almog’s 1995 exhibition The Psychonaut and His Mind Navigator, featured 360 oils, mostly self-portraits in the style of pulp magazine covers. The artist presented himself as a lecherous vampire drooling over a beautiful blond, a revolver-toting gangster, a crazed toy alien, or monstrously endowed porno star. The same year Oz Almog undertook the project En Face – Not seen and/or less seen of/by, reconstructing the images of the famous visual artists by using an original collection of interchangeable facial features' templates of Austrian Federal Police from the 70s. This was followed by conceptual exhibitions: Blok Brut (auto-erotic deaths) and Blood Addict - Bloody scenes of Murder 1949-1960, presented in Janco Dada Museum in Israel in 1997, and Shaheed (Suicide Terror phenomena) in Limbus Gallery, Tel Aviv. It is a series of selected real police photos of fatal auto-erotic strangulations, extracts from the scene-of-the-crime photos, metamorphosed with real blood into abstract light and dark compositions,

=== Him Too? ===
With his exhibition Him too? ... A Chronicle of a Cultural Obsession, Oz Almog confronts visitors with the question as to what Anne Frank and Jesus, Bob Dylan and Fred Astaire, Mr. Spock and Albert Einstein, Frida Kahlo and Madeleine Albright could possibly have in common. In more than 400 small size oil portraits, each accompanied by a short biography, Oz Almog features flamboyant heroes and anti-heroes whose only common denomination is their Jewish origin: names like Baruch Spinoza, Jack Ruby, Bob Dylan and Rosa Luxemburg. Showing the opposite to the racist anthropologists image of the Jewish Face and underling the diversity, Almog selected the personalities portrayed from the Bible, Myth and Heroic tales, Nobel laureates, politicians and soldiers, humanists, Hollywood celebrities, saints, freaks, gangsters and murderers – people who made history. Albert Einstein rubs shoulders with fashion designer Ralph Lauren, sex symbol Hedy Lamarr with the writer Franz Kafka, actress Winona Ryder with Rabbi Abraham Isaac Kook, film director Stanley Kubrick with gangster Benjamin “Bugsy” Siegel, Meyer Lansky with rock musicians Gene Simmons, Paul Stanley and Lenny Kravitz. There are also numerous celebrities such as Leonard Cohen, the rock musician Marc Bolan, film director and producer Sir Alexander Korda, politician Benjamin Disraeli and many more. After being presented in the Jewish Museum, Vienna in 1999, the exhibition traveled for full 10 years and was seen in Tel Aviv, Berlin, London, Amsterdam, Rendsburg, Budapest, Belgrade, Sarajevo, Subotica and many more European cities.

=== 2000–2001 exhibitions ===
Aktion T-4: Opera Euthanasia – part of the Memorial exhibition at the Upper Austrian State Museum, Linz in the year 2000 – featured a child's bedroom with over 350 paintings of prominent Nazis, serial killers and other criminals and once again produced a massive public reaction. Wiener en face – Portraits of Careers (Viennese en face – Portraits of Careers), with 350 paintings of prominent Viennese personalities, was shown from October 2000 to April 2001 at the Hermes Villa (part of the Historical Museum of the City of Vienna). It has been followed by Towards the Light of Dawn – Jewish Heroes of the Soviet Union (Dem Morgenrot Entgegen). With this exhibition Oz Almog has attempted to uncover what he says is the "repressed history" of the 500,000 Jews who fought in the Soviet army – a third of the 1.5 million Jewish soldiers from all Allied nations.

=== Kosher Nostra ===
In the exhibition Kosher Nostra. Jewish Gangsters in America 1890–1980, Oz Almog created an impressive documentary summary of an entire epoch of crimes committed by Jewish gangsters. Through pictures, newspaper articles, and official documents, he showed how such criminals as Meyer Lansky, Benjamin "Bugsy" Siegel, and Louis "Lepke" Buchalter had a determining influence on the development of organized crime in America. Kosher Nostra, shown in 2004-2005 at the Jewish Museum, Vienna, featured more than 160 realistic oil portraits, with most of personalities shown both full-face and from profile. Each "mug shot" was accompanied with a short biography, resulting in two books with over 1000 pages.

=== 2004–present ===
In 2004 Oz Almog presented his art installation Colors of War. Camouflage was shown in the Imperial Furniture Museum in Vienna, exhibiting the original furniture of Austro-Hungarian Emperors, re-furbished with the military camouflage fabrics. A Warrior Cult was on view at the Jewish Museum featuring the mosaic of shoulder sleeve insignias oil paintings. 2007/08 a number of international artists joined Almog in Judaica Kid’s Box project, taking up the challenge of presenting Jewish tradition, concepts, symbolism, thought and teachings in a form accessible to children. The colorful and entertaining presentation was designed to provide young and "adult" children with the means to understand the significance of the Hebrew alphabet. Judaica Kid’s Box was running for more than two years in the Jewish Museum, Vienna. At the same time Oz presented an exhibition entitled GODDEVILAETHEAR - Oz Almog + Wilhelm Reich: A Journey to Hell ("GOTTTEUFELAETHER - Oz Almog + Wilhelm Reich: Ausfluss der Hölle"). Like Wilhelm Reich has a fanatical and often esoterically inspired following, so here we have Oz’s artistic interpretation of the complex plane of Wilhelm Reich’s concepts in conjunction with a dark, phantasmagorical underworld of Jewish Hell (Gehinom).

In 2010 Oz Almog showed in Jewish Museum, Vienna, the exhibition Walls of Sound – Jewish Worlds of Music featuring Jewish music and Jewish musicians.
In 2011 Oz Almog released with DJ Shantel the compilation CD Kosher Nostra: Jewish Gangsters Greatest Hits, containing a wild mix of swing, jazz, twist, Charleston and Yiddish songs, the sound of the American Jewish Mafia throughout the '20s to the '60s.

== Published works ==
- Oz Almog, Gerhard Milchram: E.M. Lilien: Jugendstil - Erotik - Zionismus (Vienna; Braunschweig: Jüdisches Museum Wien; Braunschweigisches Landesmuseum, 1998) ISBN 978-3-85476-017-7 (in German)
- Felicitas Heimann-Jelinek: Bamot* - über die Erstellung, Zerschlagung und Restaurierung von Höhenheiligtümern: Israel 1948-1998 (Vienna, Jüdisches Museum Wien, 1998) ISBN 978-3-901398-08-7 (in German)
- Him too..??: Oz Almog's concise index Judaeorum - a chronicle of a cultural obsession (Jewish Museum Vienna, Beth Hatefutsoth, Tel Aviv, etc., 1999) ISBN 978-3-901398-14-8
- him too...?? Concise Index Judeaorum, A Chronicle of a Cultural Obsession (Vienna, Jewish Museum Vienna, 2000) ISBN 978-3-901398-28-5
- Ma Gam Hu...?? (Tel Aviv, The Nahum Goldmann Museum of Jewish Diaspora, 2000) ISBN 978-3-901398-15-5 (in Hebrew)
- Wiener an Face, Portraits von Karrieren (Vienna, Eigenverlag der Museen der Stadt Wien, 2000), Open Library ID OL24331008M (in German)
- Dem Morgenrot Entgegen, Helden der Sowjetunion (Vienna, Jewish Museum Vienna, 2002) ISBN 978-3-901398-22-3 (in German)
- der auch...?? Oz Almogs bunter Index Judaeorum, Chronik einer kulturellen Obsession (Vienna, Jewish Museum Vienna, 2003) ISBN 978-3-901398-27-8 (in German)
- Anche Lui..., Cronica de una ossessione culturale (Vienna, Jüdisches Museum Wien, 2000) (in Italian)
- зар и он...?? Оз Алмогов шаролики индекс јудеорум (Beograd, Muzej grada Beograda, 2006) ISBN 978-86-90619-38-2 (in Serbian)
- der auch...?? Oz Almogs bunter Index Judaeorum, Chronik einer kulturellen Obsession (Rendsburg, Stiftung Schleswig-Holsteinische Landmuseen, 2009) (in German)
- Kosher Nostra, Jüdische Gangster in Amerika 1890-1980 (Vienna, Jewish Museum Vienna, 2003) ISBN 978-3-901398-33-9 (in German)
- Kosher Nostra, Tod in Amerika 1890-1980 (Vienna, Jewish Museum Vienna, 2003) ISBN 978-3-901398-34-6 (in German)
- Aleph Bet Judaica Kids Box, Judentum - Grundbegriffe von Aleph bis Taw (Vienna, Jewish Museum Vienna, 2007) with additional 10 booklets, ISBN 978-3-901398-46-9 (in German)
- WALLS OF SOUND, Jewish Worlds of Music / Jüdische Musikerwelten (Vienna, Jewish Museum Vienna, 2010) ISBN 978-3-901398-55-1
- Block Brut - Transvestitismus und tödliche Unglücksfälle bei autoerotischer Betätigung (Vienna, ISR, 1994) ISBN 978-3-901697-03-6 (in German)

== See also ==
- Visual arts in Israel
