= Viktor Matejka =

Austrian author (1901–1993)

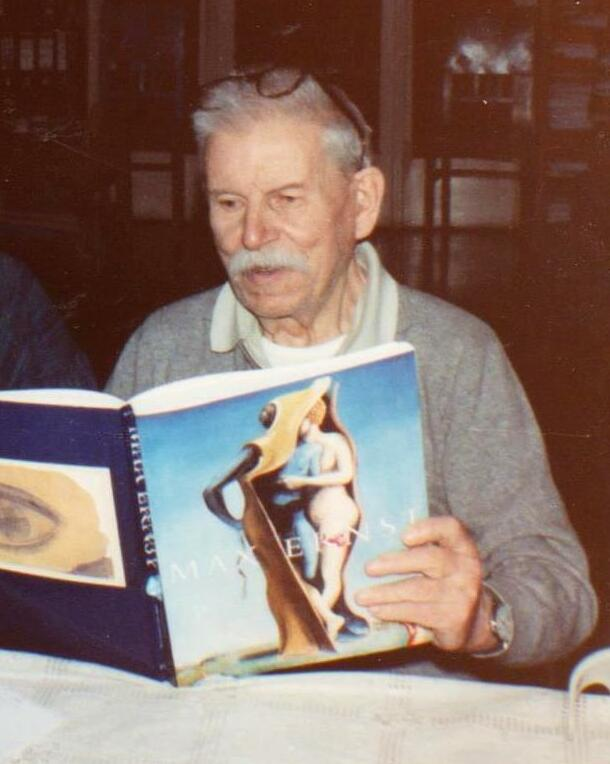
- Matejka in 1991
- Born: 4 December 1901; Korneuburg, Lower Austria, Austro-Hungarian empire
- Died: 2 April 1993; Vienna, Austria
- Education: University of Vienna
- Occupations: Journalist; Adult education lecturer Education administrator Concentration camp survivor Politician
- Political party: KPÖ
- Spouse: Gerda Matejka-Felden

Viktor Matejka (4 December 1901 – 2 April 1993) was a Viennese politician and writer.

He spent most of the Hitler years as a detainee at one of two concentration camps. In the summer of 1943, inmates at Dachau presented a satirical focusing on Adolf Hitler, watched by the camp's SS guards. The episode was described in his obituary, half a century later, as "probably the most dangerous stage performance in the world, as well as the most absurd". The leader of the improvised performance group was Viktor Matejka. Later he liked to assert that he had survived Nazism through a blend of cunning and skill, which only the malicious and ignorant would have called "collaboration".

== Life ==
=== Provenance and early years ===
Viktor Matejka was born the third of his parents' children into a lower middle-class Catholic family at Korneuburg, a small town a couple of hours' walk up-river of Vienna. His father was a former "tavern singer" who subsequently worked as a court bailiff. His mother was a former domestic servant. Matejka grew up in nearby Stockerau under conditions of some poverty. Obsessed even as a child with the importance of education, and encouraged by his mother, he saved up the money he received for serving as an altar boy and used the resulting savings to pay the fee necessary to sit the entrance exam for admission to an academically oriented secondary school ("Gymnasium"). As his school career progressed he continued to take jobs where he could find them in order to supplement the family income, taking on tutoring work and, on at least one occasion, working as a film-extra. He concluded his school career by passing his Matura exam with distinction, which opened the way for university admission.

=== Student years ===
At the University of Vienna, having enrolled to study Chemistry, Matejka very soon switched to History and Geography. The switch may have been inspired by his admiration for Ludo Moritz Hartmann who became his tutor and, it appears, an important influence. It was also Hartmann, as his "Doktorvater", who supervised him for his doctorate in international law, which was awarded by the university in 1925. After that he embarked immediately on a career as a journalist. His passionate faith in education never left him, however.

Matejka was introduced to the world of Adult Education (Note: German language sources use the term "Volksbilding" which is translated into English language texts sometimes as "adult education" and sometimes as "worker's education". It is not clear that Viktor Matejka would have recognised the need for a distinction. (A more literal translation of "Volksbildung" would be "People's education", but that is not a term much used in English language texts.)) by his university tutor Ludo Hartmann. From as early as 1926 he combined his regular written contributions to various Vienna newspapers with work delivering numerous lectures at various adult education institutions across Vienna. He employed a geopolitical approach in his classes and encouraged free discussion of economic and political issues in ways which have encouraged commentators to hold him out as a pioneer of open socio-political education in the context of "Popular Education" ("Volksbildung").

=== Post-democratic Austria ===
The Great Depression was followed by a retreat from democratic government across much of the western world. As early as 1932, in his capacity as a journalist, Viktor Matejka was warning readers against the risk of another war. He was nevertheless at this stage a member of the proto-fascist Fatherland Front (political party) established during 1933 by Chancellor Dollfuss, as one of a series of changes whereby the country now quickly became a one-party-state.

In 1934 Viktor Matejka was appointed to two important jobs which for the next two years he carried out simultaneously. In the aftermath of the February uprising, with a new "Popular Front" government installed under Engelbert Dollfuss, he was appointed to the post of "Bildungsreferent" (loosely, "chief education officer") of the Vienna "Abeiterkammer" ("Chamber of labour"). The new government had mandated a major purge of government employees at the start of 1934, and this was the context in which Matejka now also found himself appointed executive deputy chairman of Vienna's Ottakring Adult Education Centre. Despite his party membership, there was some surprise at the time that this left-wing journalist should have obtained such sudden promotion, given the right-wing instincts of the government, and in both his important government roles he did what he could to maintain the most open educational system possible, subject to the constraints imposed by the government. He saw to it that students could still benefit from hearing lecturers who were not government supporters, such as Leo Stern who was widely known to have been a left-wing activist member of the (subsequently outlawed) Social Democratic Party before 1934. In the summer of 1935, he organised readers by left-wing worker intellectuals such as Benedikt Fantner at the Vienna Workers' Riverside Bathing Facility ("Arbeiterstrandbad"). Still in 1935 he made no secret of his decision to become a member of the pacifist "Weltvereinigung für den Frieden!" organisation, viewed by many government backers as a thinly veiled front organisation for Soviet foreign policy. Despite working in a prominent position for the government of a one-party state, Matejka also pushed during this period for the reinstatement of employees who had been dismissed from their posts on political grounds.

Within the ruling Fatherland Front complaints surfaced that the Ottakring Adult Education Centre was becoming "anti-state". As the responsible executive head, Viktor Matejka was accused of allowing socialist propaganda to take hold in the college. A series of "scandals" ensued at Ottakring until on 17 July 1936, probably in response to a critical article in the catholic-conservative newspaper Reichspost, Mayor Schmitz had Matejka removed from his post.

Matejka was a prodigious reader with an insatiable appetite for political information. Early on he had read "Mein Kampf", the autobiographical manifesto produced during the 1920s by the man who in 1933 took power in Germany and five years later extended his self-conferred mandate to Austria. Having digested the book, Matejka became committed to unpicking the destructive political polarisation which the fascists were bringing to Austria. Along with Ernst Karl Winter he joined up with the circle of intellectual pacifists around Franz Kobler. Others group members included Oskar Kokoschka, Stefan Pollatschek, Rudolf Rapaport and the artist Georg Merkel. There is nothing to indicate that the men's intense discussions together did much to roll back the tide of fascism in the immediate term, but the written works and, in some cases, paintings produced by group members provided markers that pointed the way towards a saner political framework at some yet to be determined point in the future. During the 1930s Matejka also teamed up for a time with Nikolaus Hovorka to produce the pocket-book format political journal, "Berichte zur Kultur- und Zeitgeschichte" ("Reports on cultural and contemporary history").

=== Anschluss years ===
In March 1938 Austria was invaded and integrated into Hitler's Germany. Germany and Austria had been in many ways closely aligned for several years, and for many Austrians there were few immediate changes. The invaders had arrived with a list however, and Viktor Matejka's name was on it. He was arrested on 12 March 1938 and, on 1 April 1938, delivered to the Dachau concentration camp which had opened just outside Munich a few years earlier to hold political prisoners. It turned out that he had been included in the very first batch of Austrian political prisoners to be arrested and transported to Dachau following the annexation ("Anschluss"): he would spend the next six years as a concentration camp inmate. Also included in that first post-annexation transportation of "prominent persons" was Richard Schmitz, the man who two years earlier, as Mayor of Vienna, had put an end to Viktor Matejka's career as a top-level education administrator in the city.

=== Dachau and Flossenbürg ===
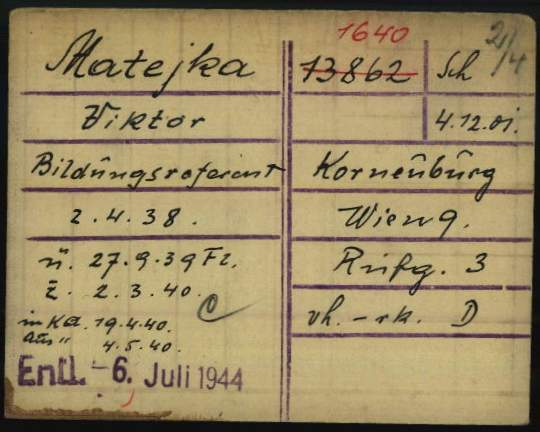
Registration card of Viktor Matejka as a prisoner at Dachau Nazi Concentration Camp

Following his arrest Matejka discovered that the security services already knew all about his foreign contacts in considerable detail. He spent the next two and a half weeks at the Roßauerlände police jail, before being transported across the (former) border to the concentration camp in Bavaria. At some point during 1940 he was transferred to the Flossenbürg concentration camp in a remote mountain location where it had been established in the hills to the west of Prague as a centre for forced labourers working the nearby granite quarries. The camp was originally intended for "criminal" and "asocial" prisoners, but sources are silent over whether or how Matejka might have fallen into those categories. During his time in the Flossenbürg camp Matejka developed friendships with the communist Karl Röder (who had been a concentration camp inmate since 1933) and the pastor-theologian Emil Felden from Bremen. (Note: Sources differ significantly over when Matejka was transferred to the concentration camp at Flossenbürg, and they are unfailingly vague about when he was returned to the camp at Dachau. The timeline inferred here come from some of the more detailed sources that appear to be the more reliable ones.) It would appear that Matejka was transported back to Dachau after perhaps a year at Flossenbürg.

The slaughter of war, especially after 1941, was leaving the country starved of fighting/working age men, with the result that the daily administration at the (men's) concentration camps was increasingly delegated to carefully selected inmates. Matejka had evidently succeeded in having himself listed among the trustworthy prisoners, and following his return to Dachau he was assigned to work as a library assistant, and then to take charge of the camp book-binding workshop. This provided him with an opportunity to start producing "Pick Books" ("Pickbüchern") with articles cut out of newspapers pasted on their pages which were distributed among fellow prisoners to try and keep them informed. The articles selected included Hitler speeches and army reports, along with features on the arts, literature, music and philosophy, all neatly cut out and grouped according to subject matter.

Despite the backbreaking nature of much of the work that the prisoners were set to perform, Sunday afternoons were respected as "time off". One Sunday afternoon during 1943 Viktor Matejka organised a production of Rudolf Kalmar's satirical "stage" show, "Die Blutnacht auf dem Schreckenstein oder Ritter Adolars Brautfahrt und ihr grausiges Ende - oder - Die wahre Liebe ist das nicht". The piece, written in the style of a Pradler Ritterspiele, was full of barely disguised unflattering oblique references to the leader which, sources insist, the SS guards in attendance failed to notice.

=== Early release ===
On 7 July 1944 Matejka was released from the camp and returned to Vienna. He managed to get himself admitted to hospital as a patient in order to avoid the risk of recruitment into the German army. The avoidance of conscription, and possibly also the early release which preceded it, involved him in the use of several medical certificates, some of which were genuinely produced by physicians: others were simple forgeries. He then "disappeared underground" (lived out of official sight and without a registered domicile or an identity card) till the war ended. It is known that during the final months of the National Socialist tyranny Matejka had links with the "O5" anti-fascist liberation organisation.

=== Communism and city politics ===
Vienna was liberated by the Red army in April 1945. Almost immediately Viktor Matejka used the new political freedoms to become a member of the Austrian Communist Party. For surviving party comrades emerging from the illegality which had been their lot since 1933, Matejka became something of an intellectual figurehead; and he seems during the later 1940s to have succeeded in living beyond the party discipline that constrained comrades without his robust intellectual hinterland and record of fearless public service during the 1930s.

On 20 April 1945 there had not yet been time for any elections to be held, and it was accordingly through nomination by his party that Matejka joined the Vienna senate (governing executive body), which was a coalition administration dominated by the Social Democrats and led by Theodor Körner. Matejka became the city senator with special responsibility for Adult and Further Education, along with The Arts. He was at this point one of three Communist Party members appointed to the Vienna city senate. All three found they had also been appointed to membership of the Party Central Committee with effect from April 1945. The appointment of the Catholic left-winger Viktor Matejka to membership of the party's ruling committee came as a surprise to many, not leastly to traditionalist comrades whose own commitment to the Austrian Communist Party had demonstrably longer roots.

City Elections held in November 1945 were disappointing for the Communist Party which was already being tarnished in the public mind by its links to the Soviet Union. Awareness of Red army atrocities against ethnic German civilians - notably the atrocities against women - had seeped quickly into the public consciousness. Nevertheless, before the election even took place the coalition partners had agreed that, at least in Vienna, their governing coalition should remain in place after it. So although the election left the Social Democrats with 58 council seats while the Communists won only 6, the Communists were still represented in the city senate. This time, however, there was one Communist Senator whereas before November there had been three. In order to comply with the pre-election coalition agreement the Social Democrats gave up one of their senate seats in favour of Viktor Matejkar. He remained the KPÖ senate member, and retained the arts and education portfolio, till 7 December 1949.

One highpoint in his four years senatorial career was the 1946 "Niemals vergessen" ("Never forget") exhibition which he commissioned (and according to at least one plausible source organised). The exhibition ran between 15 September and 26 December in the Vienna Künstlerhaus. Employing a succession of drastic displays and images, it courageously tracked the emergence and working through of fascism at a time when many people were driven by an overwhelming urge to forget the whole nightmarish business. There were plans to tour the exhibition across all the major Austrian cities, but in the end, during 1947, it toured only to Innsbruck and Linz. Matejka's senatorial term was, in addition, characterised by promotion of a number of contemporary artists who subsequently became well known. Unlike many politicians, he was also not afraid to campaign for the return to Austria artists, such as Franz Werfel, Arnold Schoenberg and the polymath Oskar Kokoschka, who had been driven into exile during the National Socialist years. Sources attribute his lack of success in enticing exiled artists to "come home" to an absence of backing from other politicians at both a city and a national level. He backed the establishment in Vienna of the Institute for Arts and Humanities (Institut für Wissenschaft und Kunst) as an information exchange between academic institutions and the wider world and worked effectively to revive Vienna's cultural life more generally. He also successfully opposed plans to tear down of Schloss Hetzendorf, an elegant albeit relatively small Baroque palace located behind the vast gardens of Schönbrunn Palace. Hetzendorf was instead reconfigured for use as a prestigious fashion academy. Although they came from different political parties, Viktor Matejka's effectiveness as senator for Arts and Education was enhanced by the fact that he generally sustained an excellent personal relationship with Mayor Theodor Körner.

=== Beyond senatorial office ===
In the 1949 city elections the Communist share of the vote slipped a little further: after the election there was no longer space for the party in the governing coalition. Matejka resigned his seat in the senate, but represented the party as a Vienna councillor (Gemeinderat) and member of the regional parliament (Landtag) till 1954. (Note: Because of the dual function of Vienna as a municipality and Austrian state (city-state), the 100 members of the Gemeinderat of Vienna, the municipal council of the city of Vienna, also act as members of the Landtag, the (normally unicameral) state legislature of Vienna.) He continued to serve as a member of the party central committee till 1957, and only resigned from the Communist Party itself in 1966.

In 1949 he became co-producer and editor in chief of the party's bi-monthly news magazine, "Tagebuch" (literally, "Diary"). Matejka had always taken a highly individualistic - some commentators prefer the adjectives "candid" and "unorthodox" - approach to his journalism, and that approach was on display in his many "Tagebuch" contributions. Circulation reached 10,000 copies by 1952, and peaked at 20,000. Keen both to build the readership and reduce the publication's financial dependency on the Austrian Communist Party, Matejka did what he could to extend circulation to neighbouring states that were still undergoing significant political turbulence, notably Hungary, Poland, Czechoslovakia and Romania. However, ethnic cleansing during the 1940s meant there was no longer a large population in those countries with mother-tongue German, while Soviet-backed governments, especially in Prague and Budapest, quickly came to identify "Tagebuch" as a "[western/imperialist] trojan horse". The Communist Party of Austria also came under pressure to discourage the sale of "Tagebuch" beyond Austria's borders. Distribution was hampered in "socialist" neighbouring states and then blocked. In February 1957 he was replaced as co-producer and editor in chief at "Tagebuch", but he remained a member of the publication's "editorial college" till his retirement from it at the end of 1966.

Matejka sustained a high public profile through his old age as an exceptionally prolific contributor, notably in the letters pages, to serious newspapers and news magazines. In addition between 1983 and 1993 he published three highly quotable autobiographical books about his overlapping careers in journalism, education administration and politics.

== Collector ==
Viktor Matejka was a collector. He specialised in collecting portraits (including several of himself) and paintings of roosters. A public exhibition of paintings from his collection was held during April 1982 at the "Wiener Secession" exhibition hall.

== Personal ==
Viktor Matejka married the artist Gerda Matejka-Felden on 23 June 1932. The bride converted to Roman Catholicism in order to facilitate the union. The marriage lasted till 5 May 1948, but the two of them remained in close contact till Gerda's death in 1984. Indeed, they continued to live together in the same apartment for several years after the divorce.

== Recognition ==
- 1977: Vienna Prize for Popular Education ("Preis der Stadt Wien für Volksbildung"
- 1991: Honorary citizenship of the City of Vienna

It is not unusual in mainland Europe for streets to be named or renamed to honour well-regarded public figures. In the case of Viktor Matejka it was not a street but a public stairway that was named for him. The elegant "Viktor-Matejka-Stiege", beside the Apollo Cinema, close to Matejka's former home in the central district of Vienna-Mariahilf, provides a connection for pedestrians between the Eggerthgasse (...alley) and the Kaunitzgasse. The staircase, formerly known as the "Eggerthstiege" ("Eggerth steps") was re-named in 1998, and has enjoyed the protected status of a historic monument ("Denkmalschutz") since 2003.

== Published output (selection) ==
- Katholik und Kommunist. Stern-Verlag, Wien 1945.
- KPÖ im Niedergang. In: Die Republik. Staatspolitische Blätter des österreichischen Nationalinstituts, Heft 1, März 1970, S. 21–28.
- Aus den Ansammlungen des Künstlerfreundes Viktor Matejka. Porträts, Hähne, Montagen und andere Sachen, Ausstellungskatalog Wiener Secession 1982.
- Widerstand ist alles. Notizen eines Unorthodoxen. Löcker, Wien 1984, ISBN 3-85409-043-9.
- Anregung ist alles – Das Buch Nr. 2. Löcker, Wien 1991, ISBN 3-85409-075-7.
- Das Buch Nr. 3. (Peter Huemer Hrsg., Vorwort von Johannes Mario Simmel). Löcker, Wien 1993, ISBN 3-85409-222-9.
