= Manfred Erjautz =

Austrian artist (born 1966)

Manfred Erjautz (born 1966 in Graz) is an Austrian artist.

== Biography ==
From 1985 to 1990, Erjautz studied at the Academy of Fine Arts Vienna under Prof. Bruno Gironcoli. He is a member of the Vienna Secession and the Forum Stadtpark.

In 1989, Erjautz used Lego bricks to create some of his sculptures. The first work made of Lego was a gun used in a fictitious bank robbery filmed by a surveillance camera. In another work, he built an electric chair from LEGO bricks, subverting LEGO's slogan “play well” by reversing its intended meaning. A controversial Lego cross, which featured a Lego truck instead of the body of Christ, was installed on the altar of the Jesuit Church, Vienna in 2004. The playful character of the Lego should relativize the seriousness and ceremoniousness of the liturgy.

One day before Christmas Eve 2008, the sculpture was vandalised with parts stolen by unknown perpetrators. It has been relocated to a much safer place on the pulpit.

== Works in collections ==
- Neue Galerie Graz – Universalmuseum Joanneum, Graz
- Upper Austrian State Museum, Linz
- Lentos Art Museum, Linz
- Museum der Moderne Salzburg, Salzburg
- Austrian Sculpture Park, Unterpremstätten
- Albertina, Vienna
- Generali Foundation, Vienna
- MAK – Museum of Applied Arts, Vienna
- Museum Moderner Kunst Stiftung Ludwig – MUMOK, Vienna
- TBA21 – Thyssen-Bornemisza Art Contemporary, Vienna
- Vienna Secession, Vienna
- The Schaufler Foundation, Sindelfingen, Germany
- Studio Stefania Miscetti, Rome, Italy

== Recognition ==
- 1999 Msgr. Otto Mauer Award
- 2008 Humanic Award
- 1991 Austria Tabak Award

== Museum exhibitions and biennials (selection) ==
- 1990 Österreichische Skulptur, Erste Allgemeine Generali Foundation, Secession, Vienna, Austria
- 1991 Un Musée en Voyage, Musée d'art contemporain de Lyon, France
- 1991 Junge Österreicher, Szombathely/Keptar, Hungary
- 1992 3. Internationale Biennale Istanbul, Turkey
- 1993 La coestistenza dell' arte, Biennale di Venezia, Venedig, Italy
- 1993 Konfrontationen, Museum moderner Kunst, Stiftung Ludwig, Vienna, Austria
- 1994 International Biennale for Printed Graphics, Zagreb, Croatia
- 1996 jenseits von kunst, Ludwig Múzeum, Museum of Contemporary Art, Budapest, Hungary
- 1996 Elektrischer Stuhl, Vienna Secession, Austria
- 1998 Disidentico maschile femminile e oltre, Palazzo Branciforte, Palermo and Museo di Castelnuovo, Neapel, Italy
- 1998 Freeze Frame, University of South Florida, Contemporary Art Museum (USFCAM), Tampa, USA
- 1999 As the matter stands, L.A. International Biennal, Patricia Faure Gallery, Los Angeles, USA
- 1999 6/7, The Living Art Museum, Reykjavik, Iceland
- 1999 Kvaliplasztik, Kunsthalle Szombathely, Hungary
- 2001 Days of hope, Biennale die Venezia, Venedig, Italy
- ME/WE, Vienna Secession, Vienna, Austria
- 2004 Farbige Plastik, Rupertinum, Salzburg, Austria
- 2005 Lichtkunst aus Kunstlicht, ZKM Karlsruhe, Germany
- 2006 Krieg der Knöpfe, Ursula Blickle Stiftung, Kraichtal-Unteröwisheim, Germany
- 2008 Under Pain of Death, ACI, New York City
- 2008 Zu Gironcoli, eine Hommage II, Gironcoli Museum Schloss Herberstein, St. Johann bei Herberstein, Styria, Austria
- 2010 Körpercodes. Menschenbilder aus der Sammlung, Museum der Moderne, MdM Salzburg, Austria
- 2011 Puppen-Projektionsfiguren in der Kunst, Museum Villa Rot, Burgrieden, Germany
- 2012 Gold, Belvedere, Vienna, Austria
- 2012 Die Sammlung, 21er Haus, Vienna, Austria
- 2012 European Glass Context 2012, Bornholm Art Museum, Gudhjem, Denmark
- 2012 Der nackte Mann, Lentos Art Museum, Linz, Austria
- 2013 Vom Raum zur Fläche, Museum Liaunig, Neuhaus, Austria
- 2013 Un bonhomme de neige en été, Atelier 340 Muzeum, Brüssel, Belgium
