= Hermine Lang-Laris =

Austrian painter (1842–1913)

- Born: April 2, 1842; Vienna, Austrian Empire
- Died: 1913 (aged 70–71); Munich
- Education: Academy of Fine Arts Vienna
- Known for: First woman to exhibit regularly at Vienna Künstlerhaus
- Notable work: Interieur mit Instrumenten; Der Botanische Garten in Wien; Stillleben
- Style: Still life, Landscape painting
- Movement: Austrian Mood Impressionism

Hermine Lang-Laris (April 2, 1842 – 1913) was an Austrian painter.

== Biography ==
Hermine Lang-Laris was born in Vienna, in what was then the Austrian Empire, in 1842. Her father was the palace governor Josef Lang.

Lang-Laris studied at the Academy of Fine Arts Vienna with the artists Remigius Adrianus Haanen and Albert Zimmermann.

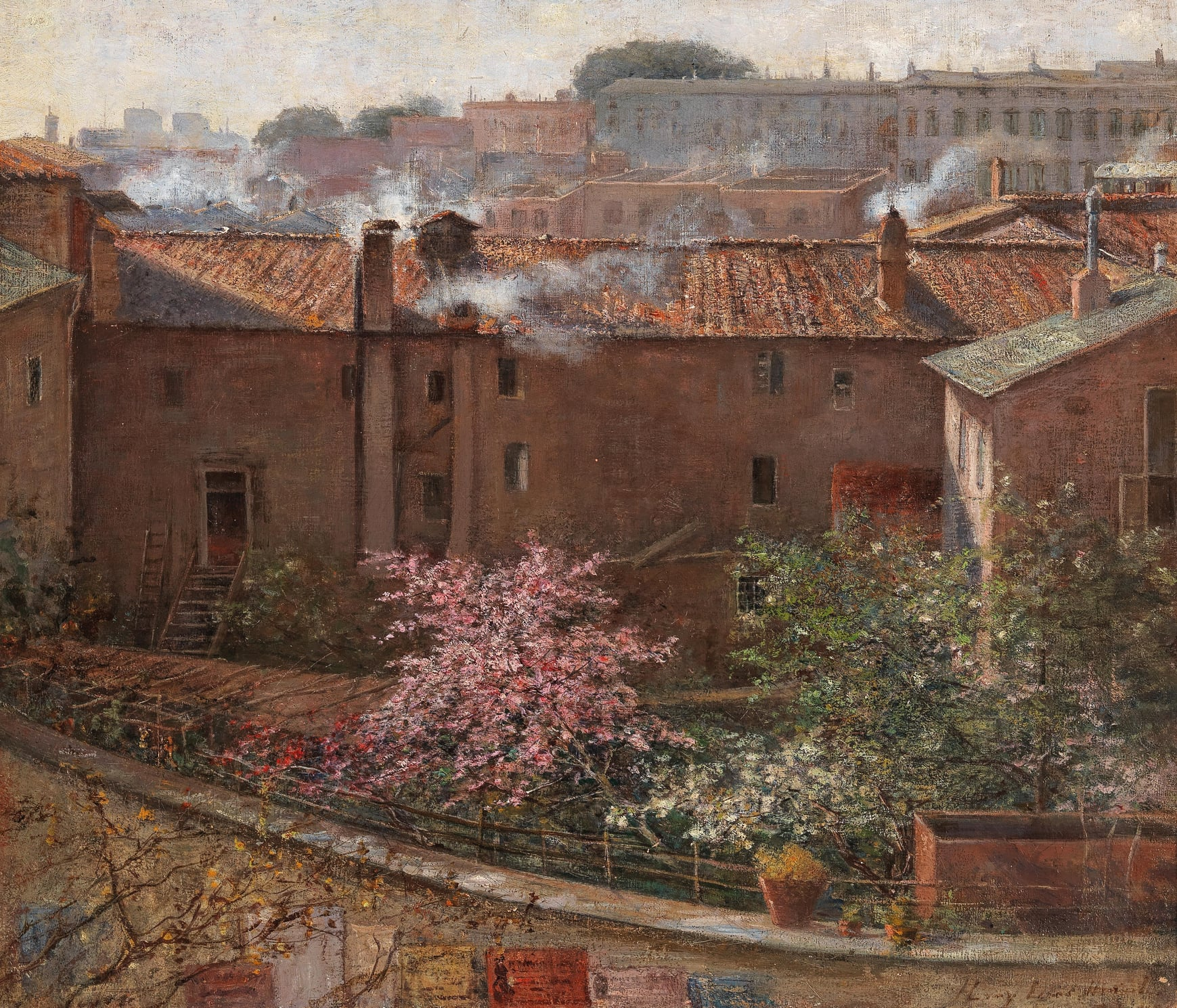
Hermine Lang-Laris, Blühende Bäume in einem Hinterhof

As an artist, she was known for her still lifes, landscapes, and depictions of flowers. Her subjects, style, and brushwork show the influence of the Austrian Mood Impressionism movement, as well as a close affinity for the works of Emil Jakob Schindler.

Beginning in 1863, she displayed her work at various shows of the Austrian Art Association and the Krakow Art Exhibitions. In 1872, she became the first woman to exhibit regularly at the Vienna Künstlerhaus.

Lang-Laris moved in 1898 to Munich, where she resided until 1913. While there, she joined the Luitpold Group, a modernist artistic community founded in 1892, as well as the Munich Artists' Cooperative.

In 1893, one of her paintings was featured at the World's Columbian Exposition in Chicago.

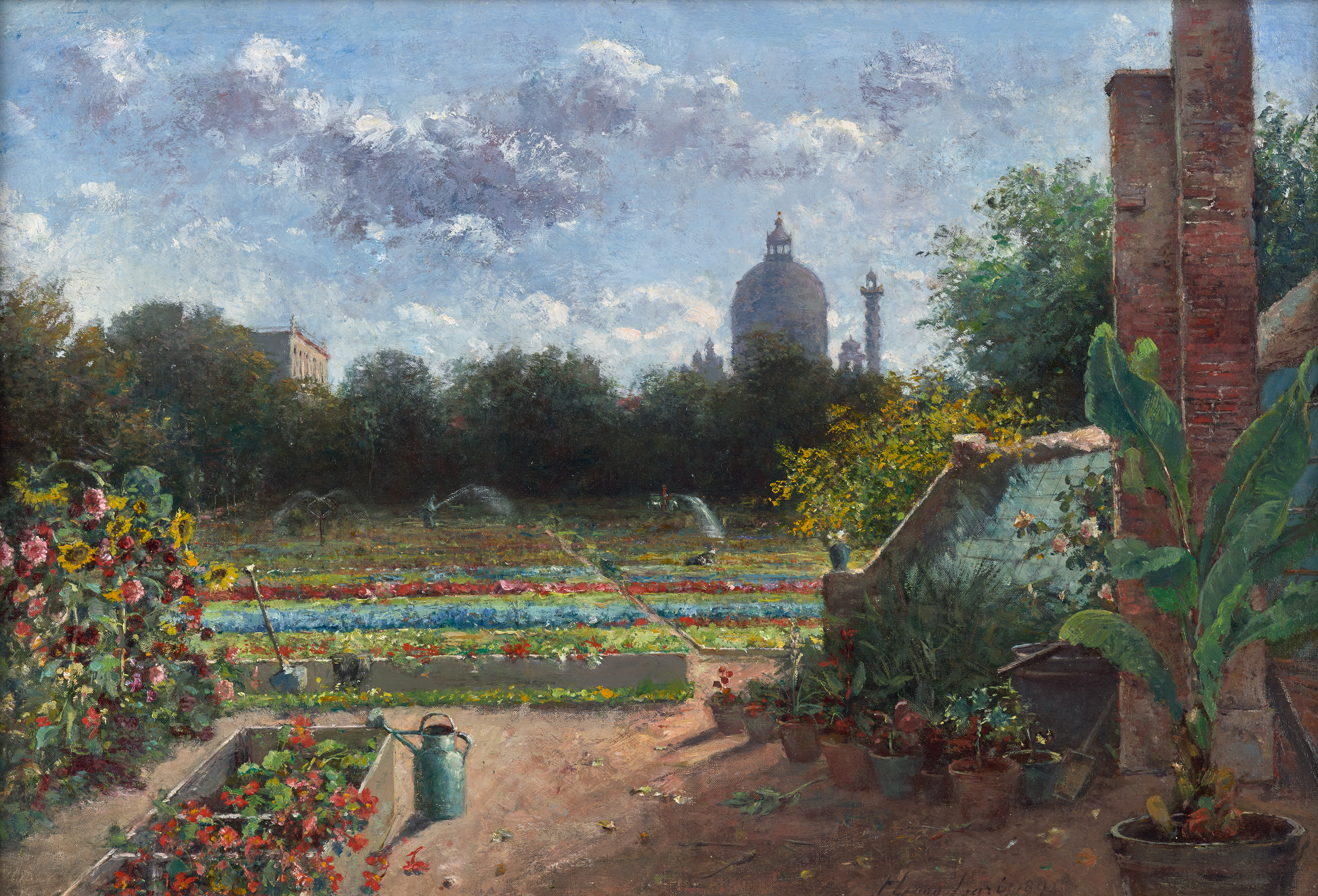
Hermine Lang-Laris, Der Botanische Garten in Wien

She died in 1913.

== Selected works ==
- 1863: Mond-Landschaft, Motiv aus Weidling in Lach, Partie bei Neuwaldegg, Aus der Umgebung Wiens, Landschaft bei Sonnenuntergang
- c. 1870: Interieur mit Instrumenten
- 1891: Der Botanische Garten in Wien
- 1897: Stillleben

== Hermine Lang-Laris Advancement Award ==
In the 1920s, the Hermine Lang-Laris Advancement Award was awarded annually to up-and-coming Austrian female artists. This prize was funded by donations from Lang-Laris's sister, Ernestine Figdor, to the Vienna Künstlerhaus. The prize was awarded each year on April 2, the deceased artist's birthday, to a Viennese female painter.

=== Winners ===
- 1920: Emma Bormann
- 1921: Bertha von Tarnóczy
- 1922: Marie Egner
- 1923: Lilly Charlemont
- 1924: Valerie Czegelka
- 1925: Anna Walt-Kammerer
- 1926: Norbertine Bresslern-Roth
- 1927: Alice Focke
