= Eszter Katalin =

Hungarian artist (born 1991)

- Born: 1991 (age 34–35)
- Occupations: Audiovisual artist, filmmaker

Eszter Katalin (Budapest, 1991) is a Hungarian audiovisual artist. Her work focuses on questioning the relationship between socio-political conflicts and their subjective representation from an LGBTQ and feminist point of view. Eszter Katalin uses the social context of Hungary as inspiration for her work, reflecting on the politics of memory and exclusion in her country.

== Biography ==
Eszter Katalin was born in Budapest in 1991. In 2018, she completed a Master's of Critical Studies at the Academy of Fine Arts Vienna. In 2019, she participated in an artist residency at the Tabakalera Contemporary Art Center in Donostia-San Sebastian. Her work has been shown at festivals such as the Diagonale – Festival of Austrian Film in Graz, the 17th Filmmor International Women's Film Festival on Wheels in Istanbul and at Rencontres Internationales Paris/Berlin 2018/19. In 2021, her short film Azkorri árnyéka alatt (Under the Shadow of Azkorri) was featured in an exhibition at BilbaoArte's Sala Urazurrutia. In 2022, the film was screened at the 16th edition of the XPOSED Queer Film Festival.

== Work ==
- Megszakítás (video in four parts, 76min), 2017.
- Versammlung (audio piece, 9 min), 2017.
- Mária Vörösben (video, 28:39 min), 2018.
- I hold you and you hold me (four-channel installation; HD video, color, sound (stereo)), Tabakalera, Donostia, España, 2019.
- I hold you and you hold me (solo art show), Likovni salon Gallery, Celje, Slovenia, 2020.
- On the Border Between Mourning and Militancy (article), Parse Journal, Issue 10, Spring 2020.
- Azkorri árnyéka alatt (Under the Shadow of Azkorri), (short film, 17 min), 2020.
