= Elmar Peintner =

Austrian artist

Elmar Peintner (born 13 October 1954) is an Austrian contemporary artist. Peintner lives and works in Imst, Tyrol.

== Early life ==
Peintner was born in 1954 in Zams, near Landeck in Tyrol, the second of seven children of Hubert Peintner, a teacher, and Laura Peintner, née Koeck, a tailoress.

From 1954 to 1972, he spent his childhood and youth in Landeck. In 1972, he sat his A-level examinations at Landeck Grammar School.

== Higher education ==
Between 1972 and 1974, he was a student at the Teacher Training Academy in Zams, qualifying as a primary school teacher. He studied at the Academy of Fine Arts under Prof. Maximilian Melcher from 1974 to 1979. In 1979, he was awarded a diploma and a Master of Fine Arts.

He was granted a Foreign Scholarship to study in Luxembourg by the Austrian Federal Ministry of Science, Research and Arts. He was a guest student of Prof. Tetsuya Noda at the Tokyo National University of Fine Arts and Music (GEIDAI), Faculty of Fine Arts in Tokyo, Japan.

== Private life ==
In 1982, Elmar Peintner moved to Imst, building himself a studio house. Peintner married Maria Foerg, a piano teacher in 1985.

== Awards ==
Peintner's works are published in a number of catalogues and books and has been awarded many honors and prizes for his art.

- 1977 Golden Füger Award, Vienna, Austria
- 1979 Uitgeverij Danthe Award, Belgium
- 1979 Master Class Award, Vienna, Austria
- 1980 Polish National Museum Award at the 8th International Biennial of Graphic Art in Kraków, Poland
- 1981 1st Prize at the 11th International Biennial of Graphic Art in Sint-Niklaas, Belgium
- 1982 1st Prize in the City of Innsbruck Art Award, Innsbruck, Austria
- 1984 Young Talent Award at the International Biennial of Graphic Art "Intergraphik 84", Berlin, Germany
- 1984 1st Prize at the II. European Triennial of Graphic Art, Grado, Italy
- 1989 Creditanstalt Award at "Fingerprints ‘89", Vienna, Austria
- 1992 IWA Foundation Award at the Biennial of Graphic Art in Ostrava and Havířov, Czech Republic
- 1992/1993 Double award winner at the International Exhibition of Graphic Art in the Napa Art Center, Napa, California, United States
- 1995 Gold Medal Winner at the 2nd International Exhibition of Graphic Art in Stockholm, Sweden
- 2002 1st Prize at the IV. SACHA 2002, Chavantes, São Paulo, Brazil
- 2004 1st Prize at the 3rd Biennial "Lilla Europa 2004", Hallsberg and Örebro, Sweden
- 2005 Special Award at the 4th Lessedra World Art Print Exhibition 2005, Sofia, Bulgaria
- 2006 Decoration of Honour in Gold for Services to the Republic of Austria
- 2008 Price at the International Print Exhibition Yunnan 2008, Kunming, China
- 2009 Price of honour at the 1st International Graphik Biennial - China 2009, Fushun City, China
- 2009 Guanlan International Print Prize at the 2nd Guanlan International Print Biennial 2009, Shenzhen, China
- 2013 Decoration of Honour of the state Tyrol, Austria
- 2016 Decoration of Honour of the City of Landeck for Art and Culture

== Art ==
=== Menschenbilder (senescent children) ===
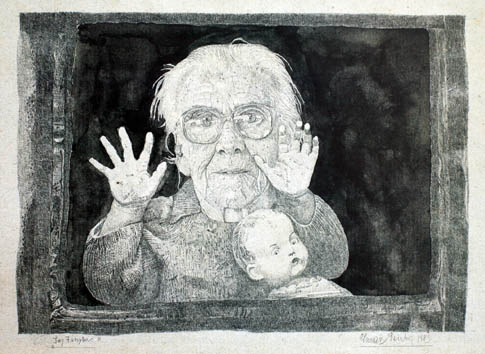
The Window, 1983, Pencil, Aquarell on Paper, 13 x 18,5 cm

Elmar Peintner rose to popularity at the beginning of the 1980s. He was a contemporary artist best known for his “Menschenbilder” (senescent children pictures), usually executed with hard pencils and additional water-colour, the models being from the family circle, the neighbourhood, or local rest homes. In the forefront, as with all his work, is not the naturalistic reproduction of nature, but the attempt to penetrate to the physical and mental structure of man via realism of microstructures.

=== Visibility, Invisibility, Reality ===
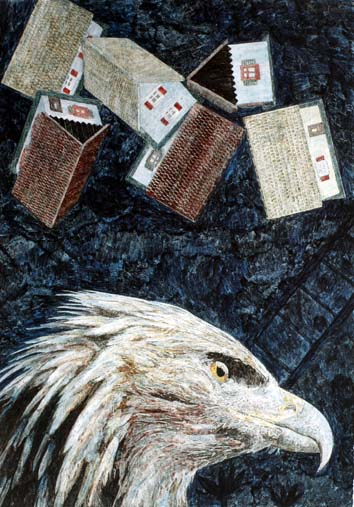
Nightpicture # 1049: Falling plastic Houses and Head of Eagle, 2002, Pencil, Egg tempera on primed paper, 38 x 27 cm, Collection Europa Haus, Tokyo

In the 90s work Peintner restricts himself to placing totally different objects next to or above, and thus in relation to, each other. The artist does not seek to create a "super – reality" by means of dream and subconscious, but in his pictures he presents poetic enigmas containing questions of reality. Far from any illusionism, neutrally suspended, what has been experienced and reflected, the real and the imaginary, meet in a tense relationship with each other, in the intention of contributing to the awareness and perception of reality.

=== Transform ===
Now Elmar Peintner presents (Museum Ferdinandeum, Innsbruck, 2004) a new series of graphite drawings which deal purely and simply with what nature offers: records of fragments or conglomerates from the patterns in nature, fanned out facet-like and presented in their transparency: ramifications, hollows, dense plasticity, nerve structures. They are not scientific herbaceous exhibits, nor are they a catalogue of floral prints. On the contrary, the subject matter emanates a liveliness of substance with all the phases of growth and decay. Inner issues and energy are released. The various processes in the unyieldingness of the substance are noted. Peintner's position as a re-creator of this nature also comes out. He declares himself in his consistency and his stamping of the graphic production. He reduces his ideal world to the factual in the motif.

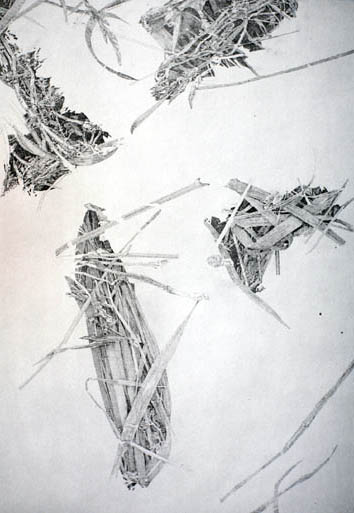
OE Nr.130-15: Untitled, 2004, Pencil on canvas, 130 x 95 cm, Collection at the Tyrolean State Museum, Innsbruck

Peintner Elmar's art "Children's Feet and Ladders" was selected for 8th Beijing International Art Biennale China 2019.

== Exhibitions (2011–2015) ==
- 2017 Einzelausstellung, Palazzo Ducale, Mantua, Italien, Kurator Peter Assmann (Catalogue)
- 2016 Einzelausstellung, Waltherhaus, Bozen, Italien (Catalogue)
- 2016 World in the Eyes of Chinese Artists and China in the Eyes of World Artists, Yan Huang Art Museum, Beijing, China (Catalogue)
- 2016 1st TKO International Miniprint Exhibition 2016, B-gallery, Tokyo, Art Zone Kaguraoka, Kyoto, Gallery Irohani, Osaka, Japan (Catalogue)
- 2016 2nd JOGJA International Miniprint Biennale (JIMB) 2016, Sangkring Art Project, Yogyakarta, Indonesia (Catalogue)
- 2016 Relation in PRINT #2, Tirana House, Yogyakarta, Indonesia
- 2016 8 Douro Biennial 2016, Douro, Portugal (Catalogue)
- 2016 15th Lessedra World Art Print Annual, Lessedra Gallery & Contemporary Art Projects, Sofia, Bulgaria (Catalogue)
- 2016 V. International Printmaking Competition Istanbul, Association of the Museums of Painting and Sculpture, CKM Caddebostan Cultural Center, Kadikoy, Istanbul, Turkey Catalogue)
- 2016 Grafik im Wechsel der Techniken, Theodor von Hörmann Galerie, Imst, Austria, Kuratorin Elisabeth Maireth
- 2016 OSTEN Biennial of Drawing, Museum of Drawing, Skopje, Macedonia (Catalogue)
- 2016 Amateras Annual Paper Art Exhibition 2016, Art Alley Gallery, Sofia, Bulgaria (Catalogue)
- 2016 Experimentales von G.K.N. und Druckgrafik von Dürer bis..., Museum im Ballhaus, Imst, Austria
- 2016 13th International Biennial of Miniature Art, Cultural Centre Modern Gallery, Gornji Milanovac, Republic of Serbia (Catalogue)
- 2016 7th Lessedra International Painting & Mixed Media Competition, Lessedra Gallery & Contemporary Art Projects, Sofia, Bulgaria (Catalogue)
- 2015 6th Beijing International Art Biennial, National Art Museum of China (NAMOC), Beijing, China
- 2015 Einzelausstellung, "Changes and Transformations", Vertretung der Europaregion Tirol - Südtirol -Trentino, Brussels, Belgium
- 2015 Tokyo International Mini-Print Triennal 2015, Tama Art University, Japan, (Catalogue)
- 2015 18th International Print Biennial Varna 2015, Varna City Art Gallery, Varna, Bulgaria (Catalogue)
- 2015 35th Mini Print International of Cadaques, Adogi Gallery, Barcelona, Spain (Catalogue)
- 2015 14th Lessedra World Art Print Annual, Lessedra Gallery & Contemporary Art Projects, Sofia, Bulgaria (Catalogue)
- 2015 "SOS Edition", Galerie Burg Hasegg, Hall, Austria
- 2015 2nd Global Print 2015, Douro, Portugal (Catalogue)
- 2015 7th AMATERAS Annual Paper Art Exhibition, Art Alley Gallery, Sofia, Bulgaria (Catalogue)
- 2014 Einzelausstellung, "ENIGMA", Tiroler Landesmuseum Ferdinandeum, Innsbruck, Austria, Kurator Günther Dankl (Catalogue)
- 2014 VII Bienaldouro 2014, "7a Bienal Internacional de Gravura –Douro 2014", Douro Museum, Alijó, Portugal (Catalogue)
- 2014 13th Lessedra World Art Print Annual, Lessedra Gallery & Contemporary Art Projects, Sofia, Bulgaria (Catalogue)
- 2014 Einzelausstellung, Schlossmuseum Landeck, Austria
- 2014 Einzelausstellung, KIND-SEIN, SOS-Kinderdorf Hermann-Gmeiner-Akademie, Innsbruck, Austria
- 2014 5th International Exhibition of Prints, Ottawa School of Art, Ottawa, Canada (Catalogue)
- 2014 PARALLELEN, Klimahaus Bremerhaven 8° Ost, Bremerhaven, Germany
- 2014 35th International Impact Art Festival, Kyoto City Museum, Kyoto, Japan (Catalogue)
- 2013 Honor-Prize-winning Prints of the Guanlan International Biennial, 798 Art Zone, Beijing, China (Catalogue)
- 2013 GLOBAL PRINT 2013, Lamego Museum, Lamego und Alijó, Portugal (Catalogue)
- 2013 Einzelausstellung, Stadtmuseum Bruneck, Bruneck, Italy
- 2013 4th Lessedra International Painting & Mixed Media Competition, Lessedra Gallery, Sofia, Bulgaria
- 2013 Stillleben – Positionen aus sechs Jahrzehnten, Schloss Kastelbell, Kastelbell – Tschars, Italy
- 2013 Art Book exhibition, Sofia Paper Art Fest 2013, National History Museum, Sofia, Bulgaria, Catalogue)
- 2013 CRUX – Das Symbol des Kreuzes, Diözesanmuseum Hofburg Brixen, Brixen, Italy, Kurator Markus Neuwirth (Catalogue)
- 2013 Paper Art Exhibition 2013 Amateras, Art Alley Gallery, Sofia, Bulgaria (Catalogue)
- 2013 17th International Print Biennial Varna 2013, Varna City Art Gallery, Varna, Bulgaria (Catalogue)
- 2013 12th Lessedra World Art Print Annual, Lessedra Gallery & Contemporary Art Projects, Sofia, Bulgaria (Catalogue)
- 2012 5th Beijing International Art Biennale (BIAB) 2012, National Art Museum of China, Beijing, China (Catalogue)
- 2012 3rd Bangkok Triennale, International Print and Drawing Exhibition, Bangkok Art and Culture Center, Bangkok, Thailand (Catalogue)
- 2012 Creative Cities Collection, zusammen mit Bridget Riley, John Atkin, Sean Scully u. a., Barbican Centre, London, GB (Catalogue)
- 2012 Tribuna Graphic 2012, Art Museum of Cluj, Cluj, Romania (Catalogue)
- 2012 1st International Biennale of Santorini, Greece
- 2012 Amateras Paper Art Exhibition, Art Alley Gallery, Sofia, Bulgaria (Catalogue)
- 2012 7th International Graphic Triennial Bitola, NI Institute and Museum, Bitola, Macedonia (Catalogue)
- 2012 33rd International Impact Art Festival, Kyoto City Museum, Kyoto, Japan (Catalogue)
- 2012 3rd International Exhibition in a very small size, Lessedra Gallery and Art Projects, Sofia, Bulgaria
- 2012 2nd International Print Exhibition Fushun 2012, Fushun Sculpture Museum, Fushun City, China (Catalogue)
- 2011 Bienal Internacional de Gravura Santos 2011, Pinacoteca Benedicto Calixto, Santos, São Paulo, Brazil (Catalogue)
- 2011 "Gastspiel", 40 österreichische Künstler aus der Sammlung der RLB, WGZ Bank, Düsseldorf, Germany, Kuratoren Ralf Hartweg und Silvia Höller (Catalogue)
- 2011 IV. International Print Exhibition Istanbul, Tophane-i Amire, Istanbul, Turkey (Catalogue)
- 2011 "Mythos Berg", together with Herbert Brandl, Andreas Gursky, Hamish Fulton, Walter Niedermayr u.a., RLB Kunstbrücke, Innsbruck, Austria, Kuratorin Silvia Höller, (Catalogue)
- 2011 Sofia Paper Art Festival - Amateras, Gallery Art Alley, Sofia, Bulgaria (Catalogue)
- 2011 Kunst und Kindheit, zusammen mit Kogler, Mullican, Fuchs u. a., UBUNTU Forum, Imst, Austria
- 2011 Grabados por la Paz México, Arte AC / Tecnológico de Monterrey, Monterrey, Mexico
- 2011 Einzelausstellung: ZEITSCHNITTE, RLB Atelier, Lienz, Austria, Kurator Georg Loewitt (Catalogue)
- 2011 10th Lessedra World Art Print Annual, Lessedra Gallery and Art Projects, Sofia, Bulgaria (Catalogue)
