= Dehlingen =

- Commune
- Coat of arms
- Location of Dehlingen
- Location within France Location within Grand Est
- Coordinates: 48°58′55″N 7°11′33″E
- Country: France
- Region: Grand Est
- Department: Bas-Rhin
- Arrondissement: Saverne
- Canton: Ingwiller

Government
  - Mayor (2020–2026): Barbara Schickner
- Area^{1}: 10.02 km^{2} (3.87 sq mi)
- Highest elevation: 356 m (1,168 ft)
- Lowest elevation: 235 m (771 ft)
- Population (2023): 342
  - Density: 34.1/km^{2} (88.4/sq mi)
- Time zone: UTC+01:00 (CET)
  - Summer (DST): UTC+02:00 (CEST)
- INSEE/Postal code: 67088 /67430
- ^{1} French Land Register data, which excludes lakes, ponds, glaciers > 1 km^{2} (0.386 sq mi or 247 acres) and river estuaries.

Dehlingen (French pronunciation: [deliŋ(ɡ)ən]) is a commune in the Bas-Rhin department in Grand Est in north-eastern France.

== See also ==
- Communes of the Bas-Rhin department
