= Li Hua (artist, born 1980) =

Chinese painter (born 1980)

- 李华
- Born: 1980 (age 45–46); Chongqing, China
- Education: Sichuan Academy of Fine Arts, Chongqing; École nationale supérieure des Beaux-Arts; Berlin University of the Arts; Academy of Fine Arts Vienna

Li Hua (Chinese: 李华, born 1980 in Chongqing, China) is a Chinese painter who studied in Europe and now lives in Chongqing.

== Life ==
Li Hua was born into a working-class family in Chongqing in 1980. From an early age, Li Hua's teachers noticed her extraordinary talent for expressing herself graphically. Hence, she left the small village where she grew up and attended the Academy of Fine Arts in Sichuan from 2001 to 2005. In 2005, Li Hua won the prestigious Louis Vuitton Prize. The success of her initial exhibitions in Shanghai, Beijing, Hong Kong and Macao opened the doors of the Paris École national supérieure des Beaux-Arts, where she studied under Jean Michel Alberola in 2007. Between 2009 and 2010 she studied at the Berlin University of the Arts and she finally settled down in Vienna in 2011. She attended the Vienna Academy of Fine Arts with Professor Erwin Bohatsch and kept contacts with Daniel Richter, who had already taught her in Berlin. In 2014 she completed her studies in Vienna, taking the diploma-exam by her mentor Daniel Richter. Her work has gained more and more international recognition in the context of contemporary art in Europe, Asia and the United States. In 2017 her works were exhibited at the Ludwig Museum Koblenz. She currently lives in China and from February 27 to March 17, 2019 her expressionist abstractions will be shown in her hometown Chongqing, curated by the Austrian gallery owner Prof. Josef Schütz. Her works will be juxtaposed with the African art collection of Dr. Herbert Stepic, pointing out the connection points between them, thus promoting intercontinental collaboration, cooperation and brotherhood. She is a member of the Chinese-Austrian Academy of Fine Arts.

== Artistic work ==
Considering her young age, Li Hua completed range of developments and metamorphoses. The central theme in her work are expressionist reflections. Her starting point is classical Chinese calligraphy. From the age of 27, her international career began, and the young artist fused the tradition of her homeland with the new cultures she experiences. If the works created in Paris and above all in Berlin are rather linear, in the most recent work series produced in Vienna and China the colours are stronger and purer, the dialectic between and within them sharper, the three-dimensionality more daring, as voluptuous as Art Nouveau and Rococo art. Concentrating the protruding dynamic in the center of the canvas, Li Hua controls the exuberance of her own creation and frames it in a decent way, that pleasures the eye without overloading it with more that it can experience.

The early, often small-format works on paper have a formal strictness, both in terms of the material and the arrangement of the image planes. Ink and pencil were the base, oil pastel or oil paint were only used occasionally. The repetition of graphic formalisms formed the foundation, which was deliberately blurred and chaotic. These series of works are darkly magical, rigorous and severe. In contrast, the most recent works are free, colorful and expressive. If one looks closely at the opulent, large-format images, though, due to the color rush, the raised streaks reveal themselves similar to the hatching of traditional calligraphy, enriching the composition both stylistically and thematically. In fact, through the elegant superimposition of different layers of colour, she honors the proud Chinese tradition enriching it with new nuances that don't conflict with the philosophy of Chinese traditional painting. According to Wáng Yuánqí: "more important than readability is the achievement of perfect aesthetic balance and the visualization of emotions".

== Exhibitions ==
- Li Huas intellectual art in the context of the naïf African folk art, Chongqing, China, 2019
- Art & Antique Residenz Salzburg, Salzburg, Austria, Schütz Fine Art-Chinese Department, 2018
- Art & Antique Hofburg Wien, Vienna, Austria, Schütz Fine Art-Chinese Department, 2018
- FAIR FOR ART VIENNA, Vienna, Austria, Schütz Fine Art-Chinese Department, 2018
- Art & Antique Residenz Salzburg, Austria, Schütz Fine Art-Chinese Department, 2017
- Art & Antique Hofburg Wien, Vienna, Austria, Schütz Fine Art-Chinese Department, 2017
- Art & Antique Residenz Salzburg, Austria, Schütz Fine Art-Chinese Department, 2016
- Art & Antique Hofburg Wien, Vienna, Austria, Schütz Fine Art-Chinese Department, 2016
- ART MIAMI NEW YORK, USA, Schütz Fine Art-Chinese Department, 2016
- WIKAM Messe im Künstlerhaus Wien, Vienna, Austria, Schütz Fine Art-Chinese Department, 2015
- Art & Antique Residenz Salzburg, Salzburg Austria, Schütz Fine Art-Chinese Department, 2015
- Olympia International Art & Antiques Fair, London, United Kingdom, Schütz Fine Art-Chinese Department, 2014
- LAPADA Art & Antiques Fair, London, United Kingdom, Schütz Fine Art-Chinese Department, 2014
- ART.FAIR Köln, Cologne, Germany, Schütz Fine Art-Chinese Department, 2014
- Art Salzburg, Salzburg, Austria, Schütz Fine Art-Chinese Department, 2014
- Cologne Paper Art, Gieven Gallery, Cologne, Germany, 2013
- Cologne Paper Art, Gieven Gallery, Cologne, Germany, 2012
- Art Ulm Gieven Gallery, Cologne, Germany, 2012
- Art & Antique Residenz Salzburg, Salzburg, Austria, Schütz Fine Art-Chinese Department, 2012
- Painting and drawing, Ray Hughes Gallery, Sydney, Australia, 2011
- 30 Years contemporary Art at the Academy of Fine Arts of Sichuan, China, Japan-China Friendship Center, Tokyo, Japan, 2009
- Sichuan Hot, Ray Hughes Gallery, Sydney, Australia, 2009
- More than imagination-Chinese abstract works, Macau Museum of Art, Macau, China, 2008
- Post Avant-Garde Chinese Contemporary Art: Four Directions of The New Era, Atting House Limited, Hong Kong, China, 2007
- New vision-2nd Exhibition of awarded works of all Chinese Academies of Art graduates, He Xiangning Art Museum, Shenzhen, China, 2005
- LVMH Young Artists' Award (Moët Hennessy-Louis Vuitton)-Hommage to the Impressionists, Moët Hennessy-Louis Vuitton, Beijing 798 Art Zone, China, 2005
- Vision Express 2005-Shanghai Biennale for young artists, Liu Haisu Art Museum, Mingyuan Art Center, Shanghai, China, 2005

== Awards and honors ==
- 2009 - 2010: DAAD-Scholarship
- 2005: LVMH - award for young artists (Moët Hennessy-Louis Vuitton)

== Selected artworks ==
- The Clock Tower in Graz 3, oil on canvas, 69,5 x 108 cm, 2017. Schütz Fine Art, Vienna, Austria
- Portrait Wolfgang Amadeus Mozart 2, oil on canvas, 80 x 60 cm, 2017. Schütz Fine Art, Vienna, Austria
- Portrait Marilyn Monroe 3, oil on canvas, 80 x 60 cm, 2017. Schütz Fine Art, Vienna, Austria
- Portrait Donald Trump 2, oil on canvas, 96 x 60 cm, 2017. Schütz Fine Art, Vienna, Austria
- Portrait Sebastian Kurz 3, oil on canvas, 108 x 70cm, 2017. Schütz Fine Art, Vienna, Austria
- Ich bin Daniel Richter, oil on canvas, 47 x 55 cm, 2014 .
- Das Fliegen, oil and gloss paint on canvas, 102 x 105 cm, 2010–2014.

== Bibliography ==
- Li Huas Tour d'Autriche, German, 62 p., Edition Schütz, Vienna, 2016
- Li Hua - Transformationen des Seins, German, 176 p., Edition Schütz, Vienna, 2017

== See also ==
- Chongqing
- Academy of Fine Arts Vienna
- Berlin University of the Arts
- École nationale supérieure des Beaux-Arts
