= Andreas Stadler (political scientist) =

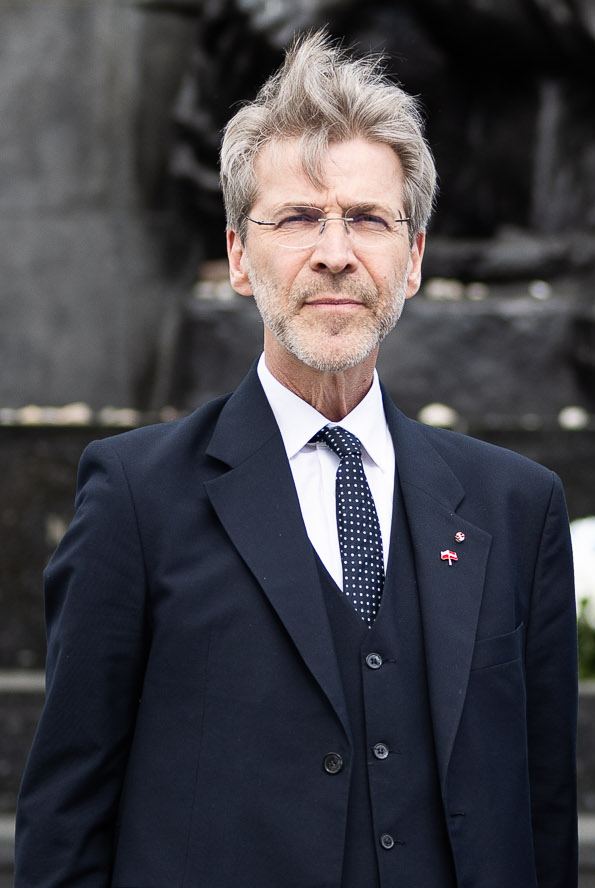
Andreas Stadler (2025).

Andreas Stadler (born 1965 in Muerzzuschlag, Austria) is an Austrian diplomat, curator, writer, lecturer, political scientist. He was the director of the Austrian Cultural Forum in New York City from 2007 to 2013. In fall of 2013 he returned to Vienna to work at the Ministry for Foreign Affairs. He was also appointed guest professor at the University of Applied Arts Vienna to teach cultural diplomacy and international arts relations. After being appointed as the Austrian Ambassador to Poland, he is the current Austrian Ambassador to Brazil and Suriname.

Andreas Stadler studied political science at the University of Vienna in Austria, and at the European University Institute in Florence, Italy. After graduation, he joined the Federal Ministry for European and International Affairs of Austria as a diplomat. From 1995 to 1999 he served as deputy ambassador in Zagreb, Croatia and from 1999 to 2004 he was the director of the Austrian Cultural Forum in Warsaw, Poland. After leaving Warsaw in 2004 he became the advisor for science, arts and culture to the President of the Republic of Austria and held the position until 2007, when he was appointed director of the Austrian Cultural Forum in New York.

== Publications ==
Stadler has published essays on issues related to European politics, cultural policies, and the politics of art in various Austrian and Polish newspapers and magazines. Among others:

- "Kulturpolitik und Demokratie /Cultural policies and democracy“, Austrian magazine of political science, 3/2006, Vienna (co-edited by Monika Mokre)
- "Das neue Polen in Europa / The new Poland in Europe“, Studienverlag Innsbruck, 2006 (co-edited with Holzhacker, Merli, Wagner)
- "More Europe, More Culture – Foreign Cultural Policies in and Beyond Europe“, Warsaw 2005, Adam Mickiewicz Institute, (co-edited with Burka, Zoltaniecki)
- "Polen – Österreich: eine vergessene Freundschaft / Poland – Austria: A forgotten friendship", in: Europäische Rundschau, Vienna 2004
- “Under Pain of Death", Exhibition catalogue, New York 2008
- "Bread and Soccer", Exhibition catalogue, New York 2008
- "The Seen and the Hidden: Discovering the Veil", Exhibition catalogue, Wiener Zeitung Edition Atelier, New York 2009
- "Selbstzensur aus Respekt", in: Datum: Seiten der Zeit, Heft 78/09
- "Raimund Abraham and the Austrian Cultural Forum New York", Hatje Cantz Verlag, Ostfildern 2010
- "NineTeenEightyFour", Exhibition catalogue, Wiener Zeitung Edition Atelier, New York 2010
- "1989 – End of History or Beginning of the Future", Exhibition catalogue, Wiener Zeitung Edition Atelier, New York 2010
- "FAQ Serbia Frequently Asked Questions", Exhibition catalogue, Wiener Zeitung Edition Atelier, New York 2010
- "Disturbing Arts and Politics in Austria", in: Viennese Actionism: The Opposite Pole of Society. Works from the Essl Collection, Krakow 2011
- "Alpine Desire", Exhibition catalogue, Passagen Verlag, New York 2012
- "Beauty Contest", Exhibition catalogue, Passagen Verlag, New York 2012
- "Fünf Räume", Domig, Hollerer, Komad/Kienzer/Ruhry/Stocker, Passagen Verlag, Wien, 2013
- "Our Haus“, Verlag Anton Pustet Salzburg, 2013
