= Schillerplatz (Vienna) =

Square in Vienna, Austria

Coordinates: 48.2018°N 16.3654°E

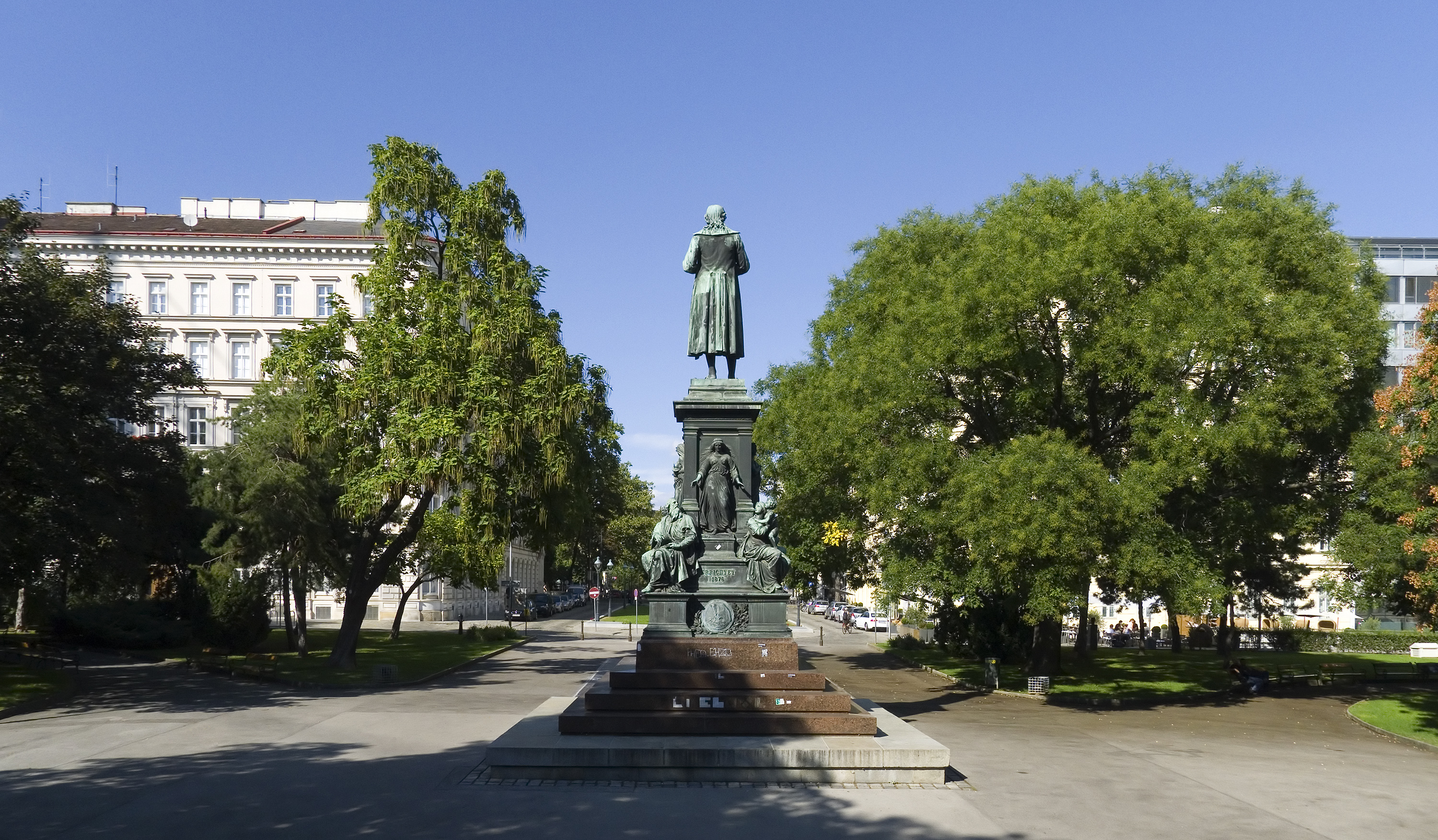
Schillerplatz

Schillerplatz (German pronunciation: [ˈʃɪlɐˌplats], lit. 'Schiller Square') is a square in Innere Stadt, Vienna, Austria.
