= Ernst Karl Winter =

Austrian sociologist and activist

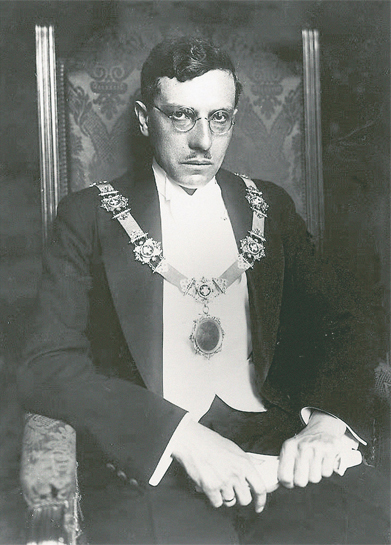
Ernst Karl Winter (circa mid-1930s)

Ernst Karl Winter (1 September 1895 – 4 February 1959) was an Austrian sociologist, journalist, politician, political activist.

== Biography ==
Ernst Karl Winter was an only child of an upper-middle-class family of writers in the city district of Währing. Early on he had become a socially committed Catholic and came across Gymnasium's Catholic youth movement of Anton Orel, whose views influenced Winter's first publications. After graduating from high school he volunteered for the Tyrolean Imperial Rifle Regiment. After the outbreak of the First World War, he met and befriended the later Federal Chancellor Engelbert Dollfuss. Winter came into conflict early on with the German nationalist ideas that were dominant in academic circles at the time. In accordance with Catholic doctrine, he refused a duel with a German nationalist officer who had challenged him because of a favourable article he wrote for the Austrian Emperor. Winter therefore lost the opportunity to pursue a career as an officer.

After the war he began studying law and political science, supplemented by courses in sociology and history. He was involved in the Catholic university association Nibelungia in the Austrian Cartel Association (ÖCV). In 1922 he completed his studies with a doctorate. A planned habilitation in sociology failed due to German nationalist circles at the University of Vienna forcing students to write articles for the far-right Deutschösterreichische Tages-Zeitung, which Winter refused to do.

Winter initially worked as a freelance journalist and private scholar, championing the concept of a "social monarchy" and developed the idea of an independent Austrian nation early on, which put him in conflict with the German Nationalists and later with National Socialism. Along with Hans Karl von Zessner-Spitzenberg, August Maria Knoll, Alfred Missong, Wilhelm Schmid, and others, Winteruwas involved in "Österreichische Aktion" (roughly: Austrian Endeavour) was launched for the first time on a programmatic journalistic basis formulated the idea of an independent Austrian identity. In his publishing house Gsur-Verlag, he published sociological and political writings that consistently showed and anti-Nazism stance. From 1933 to 1936, he also published the “Vienna Political Papers”. As a convinced monarchist, Winter also rejected Republicanism.

After the dissolution of the parliament in March 1933, Winter published sharp journalistic protests against the political developments, which he referred to as a "coup d'etat". In open letters to Dollfuss and Federal President Wilhelm Miklas he called for the restoration of democracy. After the Social Democratic Workers' Party was banned in February 1934, Winter was appointed Third Vice Mayor of the City of Vienna (see his photo with mayoral regalia) in April 1934.

Winter who was famous for his slogan "stand on the right and think on the left", organized "Aktion Winter" as deputy Vice Mayor. The organizational goal was an attempt to build a bridge between the Left and the Right and to encourage workers sympathetic to the Social Democrats to join a common front against Nazism. Winter began organizing regular meetings called "discussion evenings" to which workers were invited through press notices and posters, and where workers' rights issues were raised. Winter reported to have advised Dollfuss on the evening before his assassination to be less restrictive against the social Democrats and harsher against the Nazis, though he refused. After the death of his most powerful protector Dollfuss the next day, this policy received open resistance from the authorities.

Finally, the activities were stopped in the summer of 1935 and their agendas were attached to the Social Working Group under the Fatherland Front. In October 1936, Winter who was particularly hostile to the Heimwehr lost his position as deputy mayor. In 1938, with the advice of Hans Kelsen, he and his family managed to escape via Switzerland to the United States, where he received a professorship in sociology at the New School for Social Research in New York.

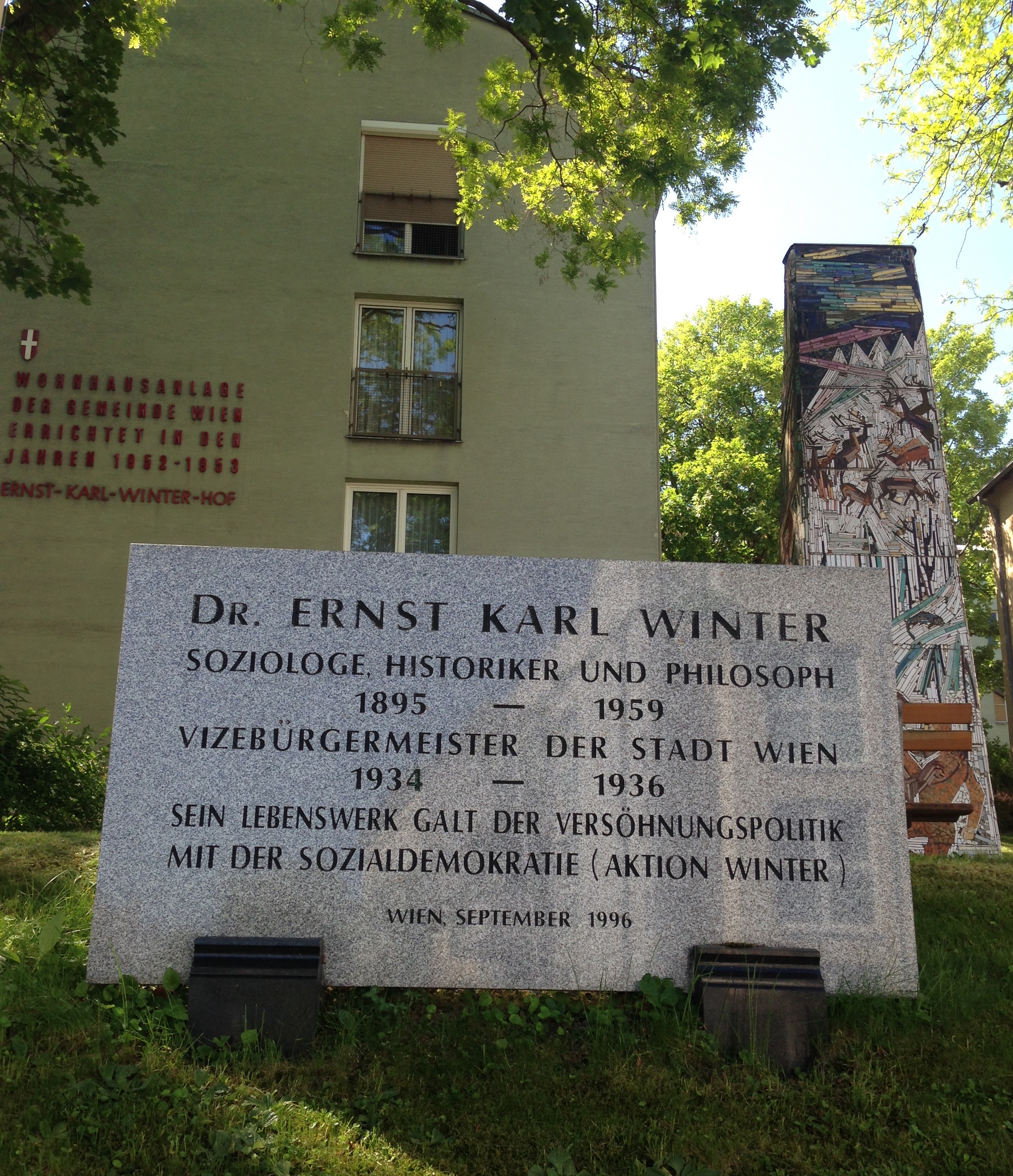
Memorial plaque in front of the Ernst-Karl-Winter-Hof

His attempts to return to Vienna failed immediately after the war, so that Winter returned to Austria only after the 1955 State Treaty. He completed his habilitation at the University of Vienna in the same year in sociology. He taught at the University of Vienna until his death.

== Works ==
- Die Sozialmetaphysik der Scholastik, 1929
- Platon. Das Soziologische in der Ideenlehre, 1930
- Rudolph IV. von Österreich, 2 Bde., 1936
- Arbeiterschaft und Staat, 1936
- Monarchie und Arbeiterschaft, 1936
- I. Seipel als dialektisches Problem, 1966.
- (Hg.): Wiener politische Blätter, 1933 ff.
- (Hg.): Wiener soziologische Studien, 1933 ff.
- Die Geschichte des österreichischen Volkes, hg. von Paul R. Tarmann. Plattform Johannes Martinek Verlag, Perchtoldsdorf 2018 (verfasst 1942–45)
- Austria. Typescript in English (New York, 1945), corrected by Rudolph Ernst Winter, translated into Austrian German by Christoph Daim. 2022. Austria-Forum Digital Copy.
- Christentum und Zivilisation, 1956
- mit K. Kramert: St. Severin, der Heilige zwischen Ost und West. Studien zum Severinsproblem, 2 Bde., 1959 f.
- Gesammelte Werke, hgg. v. E. F. Winter, 7 Bde., 1966
