= Mein Leben =

Mein Leben (German, 'My Life') may refer to:

== Autobiographies ==
- August Heinrich Hoffmann von Fallersleben (1868)
- Mein Leben (Wagner), Richard Wagner (1880)
- Johann Gottfried Seume (1899)
- Leo Königsberger (1919)
- Paul von Hindenburg (1920)
- Wilhelm von Bode (1930)
- Friedrich Griese (1934)
- Hermann Eris Busse (1935)
- Simon Dubnow (1937)
- Adele Sandrock (1940)
- Erich Raeder (1956)
- Alma Mahler (1963)
- Otto Hahn (1968)
- Oskar Kokoschka (1972)
- Marcel Reich-Ranicki (2003) (English title The Author of Himself: The Life of Marcel Reich-Ranicki)

== Other uses ==
- Mein Leben (TV series), a series of biographical documentaries from French/German TV network Arte
- A difficulty in games starting at Wolfenstein II: The New Colossus of the Wolfenstein game series.
