= Werner Peiner =

German painter (1897–1984)

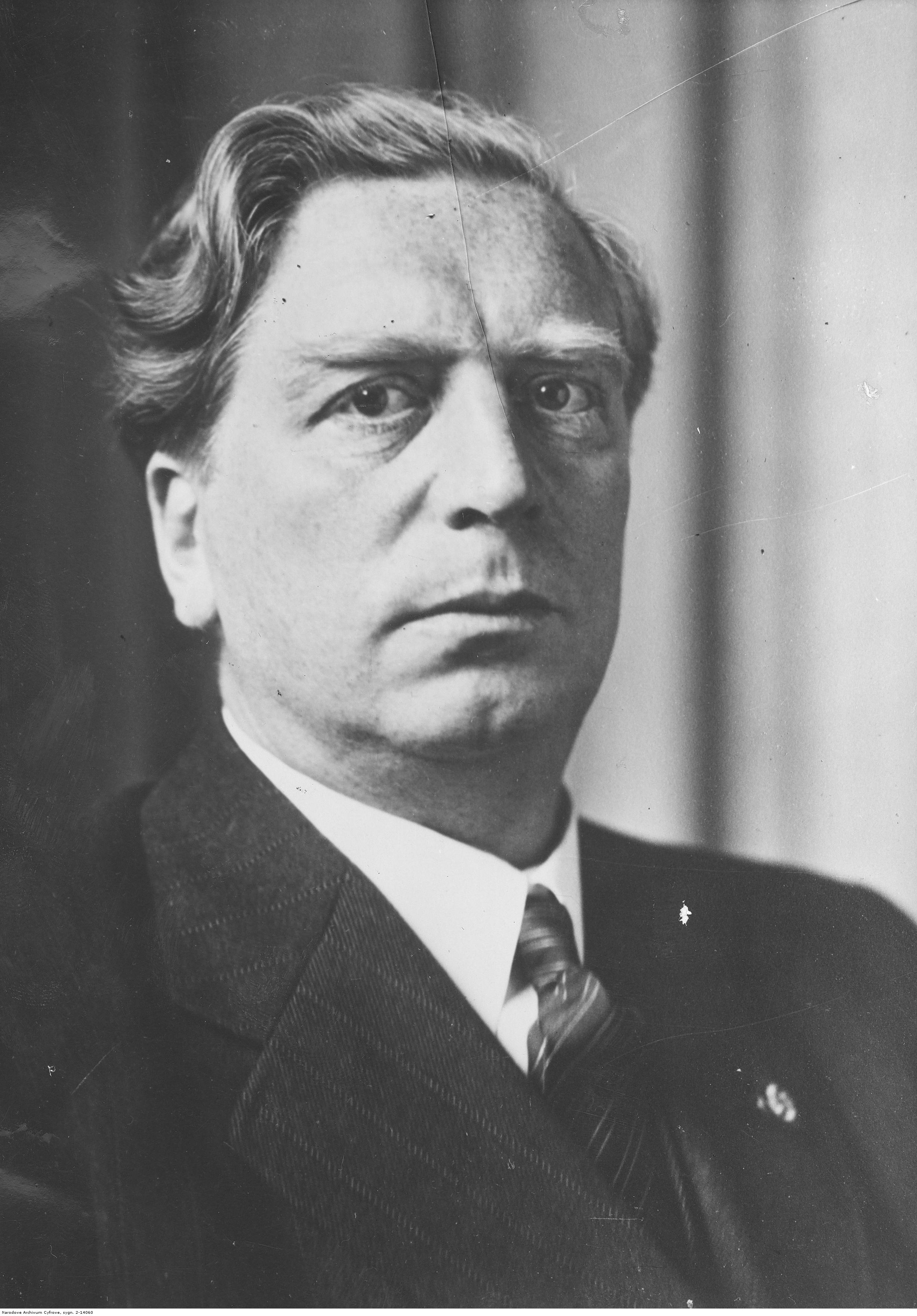
- Werner Peiner (1942)
- Born: 20 July 1897; Düsseldorf, German Empire
- Died: 19 August 1984 (aged 87); Leichlingen, West Germany
- Occupation: Painter
- Known for: Painting
- Movement: Realism, New Objectivity, Blood and Soil, Nazi art
- Patrons: Hermann Göring

Werner Peiner (20 July 1897 - 19 August 1984) was a German painter. He was first influenced by realism, and later by New Objectivity. He was known as one of the official painters of the Third Reich due to the favour he received from the public and from senior Nazis, allowing him a successful career under the regime. Nowadays he is largely forgotten and many of his works are now missing.

== Life and career ==
Peiner was born in Düsseldorf, the son of the merchant Joseph Peiner (1867–1945) and his wife Sophia, née Maintz (1871–1951). Peiner grew up in Düsseldorf, where his father had risen to become the managing director of a wood wholesaler. He attended school up to the Oberprima. When the First World War broke out, he volunteered for the army with a Uhlan regiment. He was promoted to lieutenant and served on the western front.

After the war, Peiner studied at the Düsseldorf Art Academy, since 1919, after initially taking private lessons from Wilhelm Döringer, a friend of his father. In the 1920s he guested and painted with Katharina "Nette" Faymonville in the Burghotel zu Kronenburg in the Eifel. In the same year he joined forces with Fritz Burmann and Richard Gessner to form the 'Dreimannbund'..In 1923 Peiner married Marie Therese "Resi" Lauffs and moved to Bonn to live with his in-laws. The couple had no children; in 1950 they adopted the orphaned daughter of a cousin. In mid-1925 Peiner set up a studio in Düsseldorf. During this time, through the mediation of his friends, the architect Emil Fahrenkamp and the entrepreneur Walter Kruspig (since 1930 general director of Rhenania-Ossag), Peiner received artistic commissions for the design of church, insurance and industrial buildings, while continuing to paint as well.

In 1931, Peiner settled in Kronenburg and began converting several houses in the historic town center into a studio. Today, one of them is used as a hotel. Peiner played a key role in the construction of the sewage system in Kronenburg (but not in the valley settlement of Kronenburgerhütte), as the sewage running across the street bothered him. Street lamps designed by him can still be found in Kronenburg today.

Peiner appears to have experimented with some more overtly modernist applications of New Objectivity during the Weimar Republic, as can be seen in his 1923 Rossebändiger vor einem Zirkuszelt. He was exhibited in Gustav Hartlaub's 1925 exhibition in Mannheim where the genre was publicly named and classified for the first time. However, this more daring style appears to have disappeared by the mid-to-late 1920s, and by the time of the Third Reich he was painting in a conservative New Objectivity style. In 1931-2 he published writings arguing for the need of a truly 'German art' and urging the ‘Volk’ to rise and regain their liberty, causing Dieter and Martin Pesch to label him 'a herald of the National Socialists'.

In 1933 he was appointed professor of monumental painting at the Düsseldorf Art Academy. He succeeded Heinrich Campendonk, who had been dismissed shortly before. Peiner owed his appointment not only to his acquaintance with the provisional director of the art academy, Julius Paul Junghanns, but probably also to his painting Deutsche Erde, or German Land, which is associated with the Nazi movement of blood and soil, and is a foundational example of the artistic current bearing the same name. The painting was donated by the town of Mechernich to Schleiden district administrator Josef Schramm. Schleiden NSDAP district leader Franz Binz handed it personally to Adolf Hitler. It is recorded to have hung on the walls of Hitler's private rooms. According to Rolf Dettmann, a student of Peiner's, Peiner's friendship with Kruspig could also have played a role in the appointment.

Peiner had a tense relationship with Peter Grund, the director of the Düsseldorf Academy since 1933/1934. Through Kruspig's mediation, Peiner had personal access to Hermann Göring. In a talk with Göring on January 24, 1936, Peiner succeeded in getting his wish to found his own academy. On March 23, 1936, the minister for art, science and popular education issued a decree establishing the “Landakademie Kronenburg der Staatliche Kunstakademie Düsseldorf”, with Peiner at its head. As the Hermann Göring Master School for Painting, it became independent in 1938. Peiner's students in Kronenburg included Rolf Dettmann, Heinz Hindorf, Hans Lohbeck, Willi Sitte and Willi Wewer.

Peiner obtained permission from Göring to take a journey to East Africa from February 1935, where he travelled through (in contemporary language) Kenya, Tanganika, Uganda, the East Congo and Sudan, photographing wildlife, landscapes both urban and rural, and human subjects. This material was subsequently published in a book called Das Gesicht Ostafrikas. After this he made many African paintings, beginning with thirteen large works on his return to Germany. This Afrikafolge was exhibited from 1938 on as politically expedient ‘'documentary material'. Hitler bought three works, Göring two, and many others were acquired for display by the Hunting Museum or the Ministry of Culture. The Das Schwarze Paradies triptych was displayed in the New Reich Chancellery. Some of his African landscapes were made into postcards and sold to the public to great success. Africa continued to be an important subject matter for him until his death.

In the Nazi period, among other things, Peiner designed monumental tapestries for the New Reich Chancellery. A nude of his even hung over Göring's bed at Carinhall. Peiner applied for admission to the NSDAP on July 13, 1937, later backdated to the first of May of the same year. In the same year he became a member of the Prussian Academy of Arts. In 1940 he was appointed to the Prussian State Council. In 1944, in the final phase of the Second World War, Adolf Hitler included him in the special list of the God-gifted list of people exempt from conscription, marking him as one of the twelve most important visual artists. There is a widespread belief that he had work labelled by the regime as degenerate art and subsequently confiscated, but there appears to be no basis for this.

In 1944, Peiner moved with his wife to Gimborn in Oberbergisches Land. In August 1945, he was interned by the Allies and in 1946 he put himself forward for denazification in Gummersbach in North-Rhine Westphalia, denying that he was ever a party member on his second time filling out the Fragebogen and speaking at his hearing in a tone described as 'laughing' while explaining the swastika’s ancient origins when questioned by the panel on why he included it in his work. Despite appearing very emotionally shaken by the revelation of Nazi crimes against humanity during the Holocaust, he spoke out against the execution of senior Nazis once these Nazi crimes against humanity were exposed. He also carried on associating with other ex-Nazis, acted as a witness to their innocence during their own denazification trials, and used 'jewish' as an insult. In 1948 he acquired the dilapidated Haus Vorst castle in Leichlingen, which he restored over the years. He lived and worked there until his death, in 1984.

Like other German painters favoured during the Third Reich, such as Conrad Hommel and Adolf Wissel, his reputation in Germany and in the Western world, was tainted after World War II. In the post-war period, Peiner was mainly a landscape painter, only exhibiting once more but continuing his career due to a circle of supporters. He also, among other works, created tapestries for the Gerling Group and for the Ethiopian Emperor Haile Selassie.

== Art work ==
Peiner was mostly inspired by the old masters, such as Pieter Bruegel the Elder. In 1928, he still created a series of Impressionist-inspired landscapes. He had an realistic style, which made him successful with his private clients. In the 1920s he was a sought-after portrait painter in the Rhineland.

Peiner's most important works during the Third Reich where his tapestries. His Nazi-commissioned works included the cycle of the German Battles of Fate for the Marble Gallery, also known as the Long Hall, of the New Reich Chancellery, in Berlin, the drafts of which are now exhibited in the Rheinisches Landesmuseum Bonn. He created drafts, and the theme of a seventh tapestry, measuring 5.40 by 10 meters, related to battles of Germany's history, namely The Battle of the Teutoburg Forest, Heinrich I in the Battle of Hungary, The Siege of Marienburg, The Battle of the Turks near Vienna, Frederick the Great near Kunersdorf, The Battle of Leipzig, and Tank Battle of Cambrai. The eighth tapestry was intended to depict a decisive battle from World War II. Peiner also created the cartoon for the monumental tapestry Die Erdkugel, begun but not completed at the Paris Manufacture des Gobelins and destined for Hermann Göring's monumental Carinhall estate. It was exhibited at the Munich Hypo-Kunsthalle in the exhibition "The Threads of Modernity", from December 2019 to March 2020. Since the post-war period, his works have rarely been exhibited in public because of his involvement with Nazism.

He was represented with 33 works at the Great German Art Exhibitions, in the Munich House of German Art, from 1937 to 1944.
