= Heroic realism =

Art used as political propaganda

Heroic realism is art used as political propaganda. Examples include the socialist realism style associated with socialist states, and sometimes the similar art style associated with fascism. Its characteristics are realism and the depiction of figures as ideal types or symbols, often with an explicit rejection of modernism in art (as "bourgeois" or "degenerate").

== Purposes ==
Both socialist art and Nazi art were explicitly ordered to be heroic, and were in consequence an ideal form of the real, rather than pure realism.

Heroic realism designs were used to propagate the revolution in the Soviet Union during Lenin's time. Lenin doubted that the illiterate population would understand what abstract visual images were intended to communicate. He also thought that artists, such as constructivists and productivists, may have had a hidden agenda against the government. Movements such as Cubism were denounced as bourgeois and criticized for its failure to draw on the heritage of art and for rejecting the beautiful on the grounds that it was "old", whereas proletarian culture had to draw on what was learned in the prior times. The artists countered such thinking, however, by saying that the advanced art represented the advanced political ideas.

In literature, Maxim Gorky urged that one obtained realism by extracting the basic idea from reality, but by adding the potential and desirable to it, one added romanticism with deep revolutionary potential.

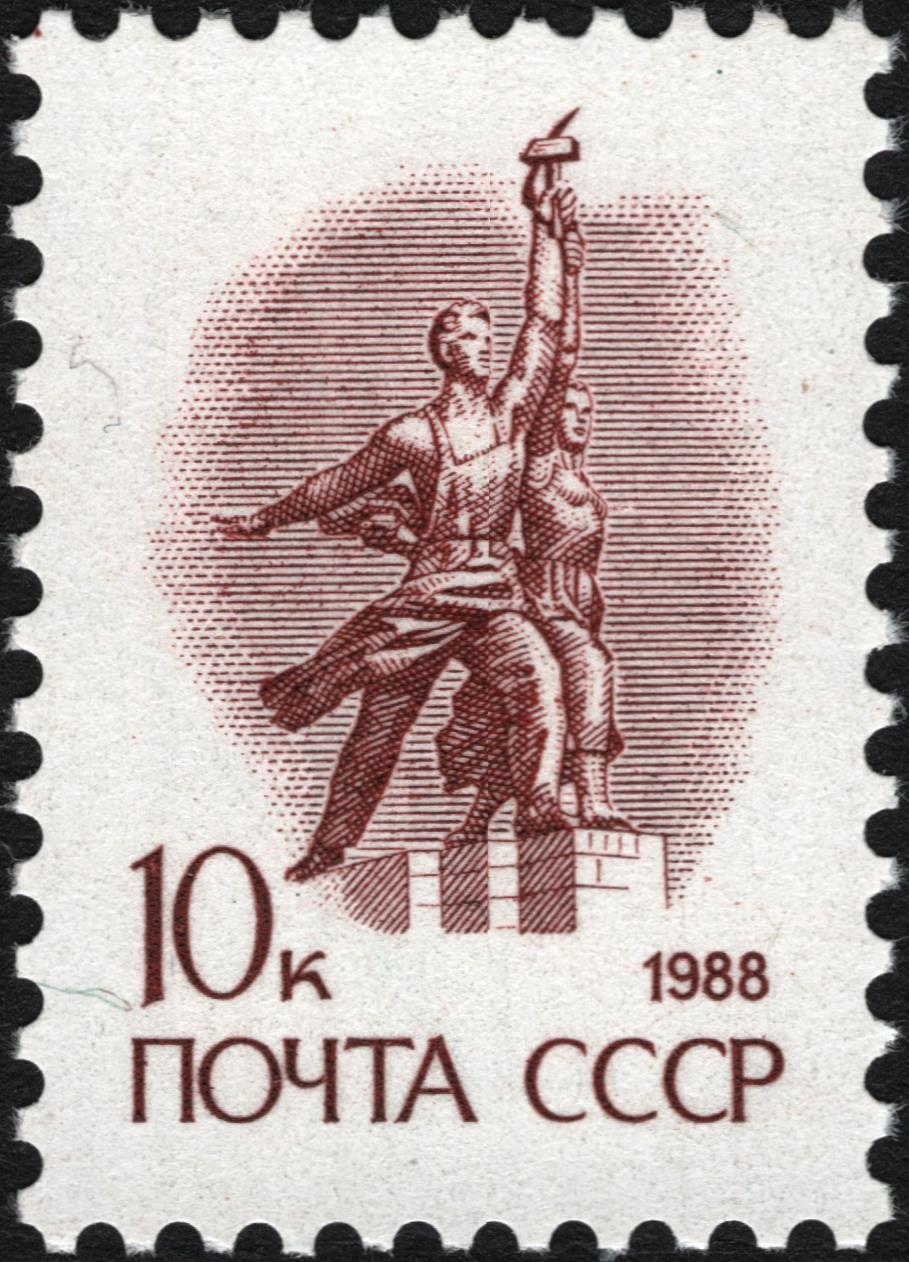
Worker and Kolkhoz Woman

Stalin understood the powerful message which could be sent through images to a primarily illiterate population. Once he was in power, posters quickly became the new medium for educating illiterate peasants on daily life—from bathing, to farming, the posters provided visual instruction on almost everything. In 1931–2, the early emphasis on the "little man" and the anonymous laboring masses gave way to the "hero of labor", derived from the people but set apart by the scale of his deeds. As a consequence, literature filled with "positive heroes" that were sometimes tedious.

In 1934, a new doctrine called Socialist realism came about. This new movement rejected the "bourgeois influence on art" and replaced it with appreciation for figurative painting, photography and new typography layouts. Writers were explicitly enjoined to develop "heroization." At the Paris World Fair, Vera Mukhina's Worker and Kolkhoz Woman exemplified the ideal New Soviet Man, depicting a man and woman in working clothes, with his hammer and her sickle crossed, in a monumental statue with both striding forward.

When Adolf Hitler came to power in Germany in 1933, modern art was condemned as degenerate, and largely prohibited. The Nazis promoted a style of art based on classical models, intended to nurture nationalism. Heroic realism was to inculcate values of sacrifice, duty, and devotion. The heroic man, who was bound to blood and soil, acted rather than thought and sacrificed himself. This particularly favored the heroic death.

Nazi theory explicitly rejected "materialism", and therefore, despite the realistic treatment of images, "realism" was a seldom used term. A painter was to create an ideal picture, for eternity. The images of men, and still more of women, were heavily stereotyped, with physical perfection required for the nude paintings. In painting, peasants were popular images, reflecting a simple life in harmony with nature. Sculpture's monumental possibilities gave it a better expression of Nazi racial theories. The most common image was of the nude male, expressing the ideal of the Aryan race. Arno Breker's skill at this type made him Hitler's favorite sculptor. Nude females were also common, though they tended to be less monumental. In both cases, the physical form was to show no imperfections. At the Paris Exposition of 1937, Josef Thorak's Comradeship stood outside the German pavilion, depicting two enormous nude males, clasping hands and standing defiantly side by side, in a pose of defense and racial camaraderie. Sacrifice is associated with enduring adversity, each person is expected to give one's own life for the people since your people can demand of you what it has given you, thus is sacrifice tied to duty. Justice comes from the fulfillment of duty, the highest duty is the greatest happiness. Doing one's duty is the sign of a free man, since he does what is required of him, and it is required of all of us, that demand of the people. A person who has done his duty to his utmost and has done it better than someone else higher or lower in the pecking order deserves greater admiration and esteem. He or she that done his or her duty in such a way has the greatest right to guide a country.

== See also ==
- Degenerate art
- Nazi art
- Realism (arts)
- Romantic realism
- Soviet art
- Totalitarian kitsch

== Resources ==
- Heller, Steven, and Seymour Chwast. Graphic Style from Victorian to Digital. New ed. New York: Harry N. Abrams, Inc., 2001. 53–57. (This resource provides many good examples of heroic realism and a detailed description of the history.)
- Hollis, R. (2001). Graphic design: a concise history. World of art. New York: Thames & Hudson. ISBN 0-500-20347-4
