= Romantic realism =

Art combining romanticism and realism

Romantic realism is art that combines elements of both romanticism and realism. The terms "romanticism" and "realism" have been used in varied ways, and are sometimes seen as opposed to one another.

== In literature and art ==
The term has long standing in literary criticism. For example, Joseph Conrad's relationship to romantic realism is analyzed in Ruth M. Stauffer's 1922 book Joseph Conrad: His Romantic Realism. Liam O'Flaherty's relationship to romantic realism is discussed in P.F. Sheeran's book The Novels of Liam O'Flaherty: A Study in Romantic Realism. Fyodor Dostoyevsky is described as a romantic realist in Donald Fanger's book, Dostoevsky and Romantic Realism: A Study of Dostoevsky in Relation to Balzac, Dickens, and Gogol. Historian Jacques Barzun argued that romanticism was falsely opposed to realism and declared that "...the romantic realist does not blink his weakness, but exerts his power."

The term also has long standing in art criticism. Art scholar John Baur described it as "a form of realism modified to express a romantic attitude or meaning". According to Theodor W. Adorno, the term "romantic realism" was used by Joseph Goebbels to define the official doctrine of the art produced in Nazi Germany, although this usage did not achieve wide currency.

In 1928 Anatoly Lunacharsky, People's Commissar for Education of the Soviet Union, wrote:

The proletariat will introduce a strong romantic-realist current into all art. Romantic, because it is full of aspirations and is not yet a complete class, so that the mighty content of its culture cannot yet find an appropriate framework for itself; realistic insofar as Plekhanov noted, insofar as the class that intends to build here on earth and is imbued with deep faith in such construction is intimately connected with reality as it is.

Novelist and philosopher Ayn Rand described herself as a romantic realist, and many followers of Objectivism who work in the arts apply this term to themselves. As part of her aesthetics, Rand defined romanticism as a "category of art based on the recognition of the principle that man possesses the faculty of volition", a realm of heroes and villains, which she contrasted to naturalism. She wanted her art to be a portrayal of life "as it could be and should be". She wrote: "The method of romantic realism is to make life more beautiful and interesting than it actually is, yet give it all the reality, and even a more convincing reality than that of our everyday existence." Her definition did not limit itself to the positive though. She considered Fyodor Dostoyevsky to be a romantic realist as well.

== In music ==
"Realism" in music is often associated with the use of music for the depiction of objects, whether they be real (as in Bedřich Smetana's "Peasant Wedding" of Die Moldau) or mythological (as in Richard Wagner's Ring cycle). Musicologist Richard Taruskin discusses what he calls the "black romanticism" of Niccolò Paganini and Franz Liszt, i.e., the development and use of musical techniques that can be used to depict or suggest "grotesque" creatures or objects, such as the "laugh of the devil", to create a "frightening atmosphere". Thus, Taruskin's "black romanticism" is a form of "romantic realism" deployed by nineteenth-century virtuosi with the intent of invoking fear or "the sublime".

In the nineteenth century, historians traditionally associate romantic realism with the works of Richard Wagner. It featured settings that are claimed to have historical accuracy in accordance with the prevailing myth of realism. These works formed part of Wagner's notion based on aesthetic realism called the "invisible theater", which sought to create the fullest illusion of reality inside the theater.

There are scholars who also identify musicians such as Hector Berlioz and Franz Liszt as romantic realists. Liszt was noted for his romantic realism, free tonality, and program-music as an adherent of the New German School. Historians also cite how totalitarian dictators choose romantic realism as the music for the masses. It is said that Adolf Hitler favored Parsifal while Joseph Stalin liked Wolfgang Amadeus Mozart's piano concertos.

== See also ==
- Classical Realism
- Futurism
- Kitsch movement
- Low fantasy
- Magic realism
- Socialist realism
- Heroic realism
