= Mein Leben (TV series) =

Documentary series covering artists' lives

Mein Leben ('My Life') is a series of biographical documentaries from the French/German TV network Arte. The series, which has been running since 2003, covers artists from all disciplines, including actors, authors, musicians and photographers. Each episode runs approximately 45 minutes.

== Episode subjects include ==
- Franziska van Almsick (2003)
- Campino (2004)
- Paul Auster (2006)
- Mads Mikkelsen (2006)
- Norman Mailer (2007)
- Fatih Akın (2007)
- Moritz Rinke (2007)
- Jim Rocket (2007)
- Peter Härtling (2008)
- Alexandra Maria Lara and Valentin Plătăreanu (2008)
- Nina Hoss (2009)
- Carl Djerassi (2009)
- Christian Stückl (2010)
- Sibylle Bergemann
