= Fritz Koelle =

German sculptor

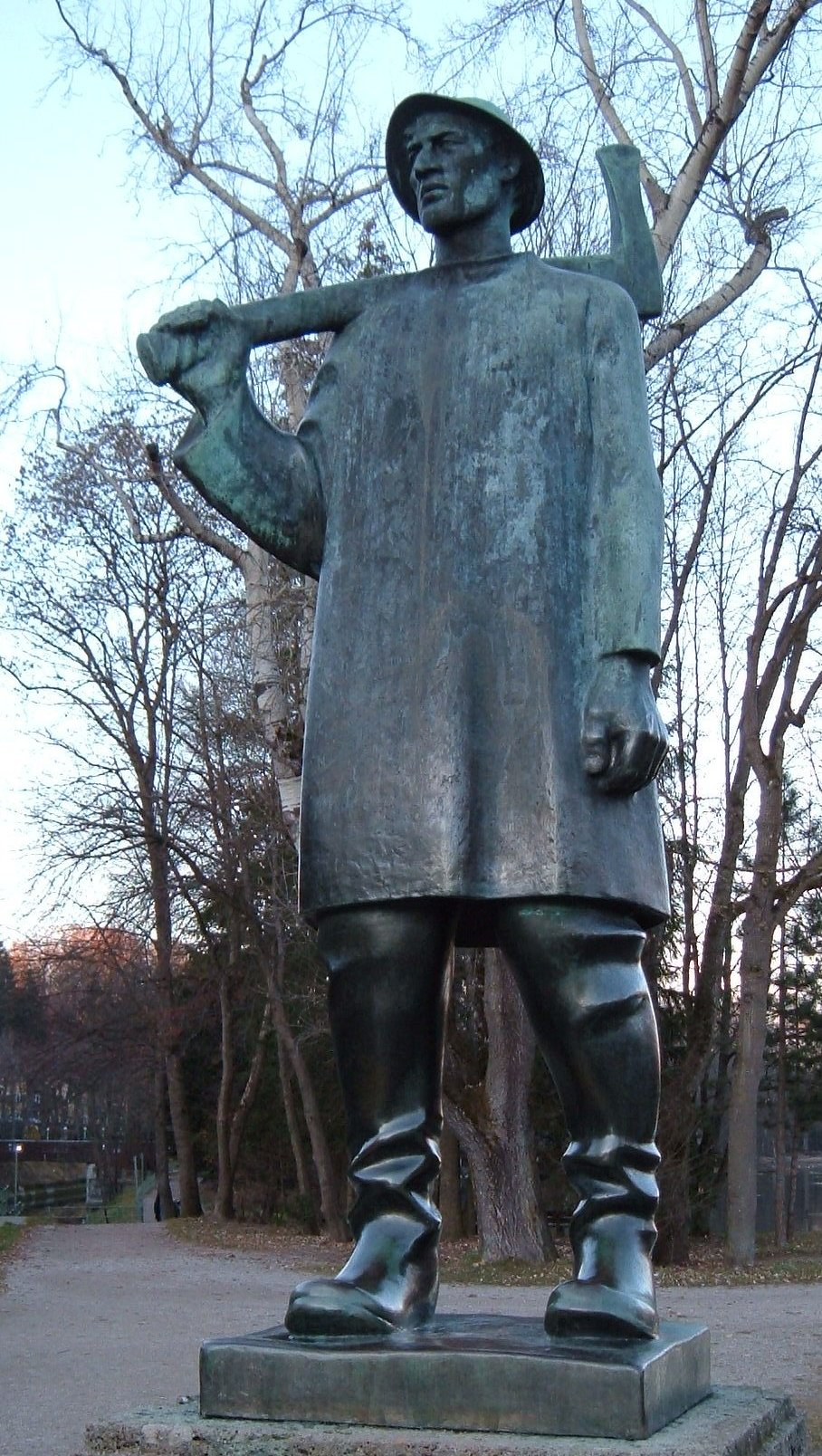
Der Isarflößer (1937), Munich

Fritz Koelle (10 March 1895, Augsburg — 4 August 1953, Probstzella) was a German sculptor.
