= Adolf Wissel =

German Nazi painter (1894–1973)

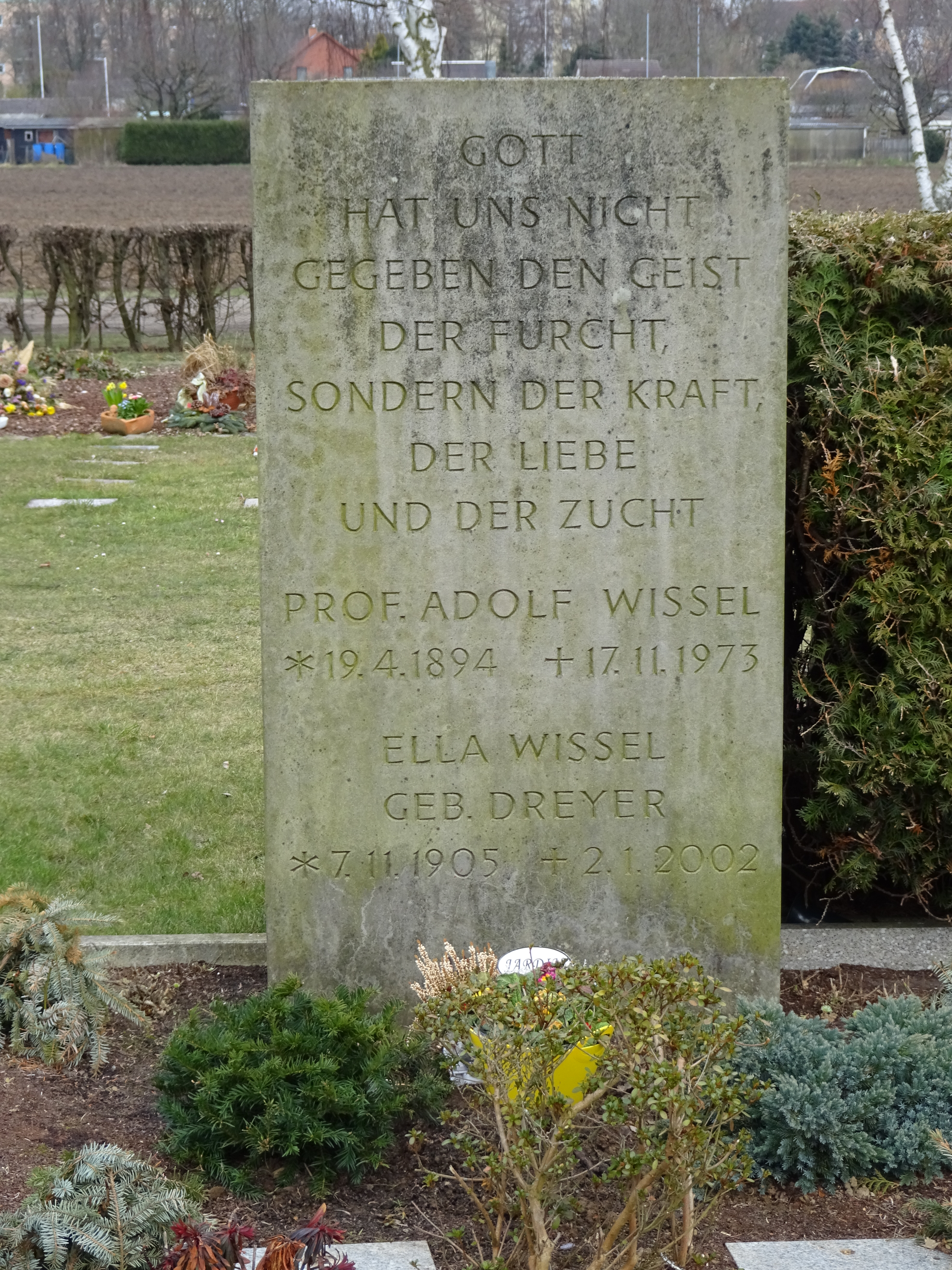
- Grave of Adolf Wissel
- Born: 19 April 1894; Velber, German Empire
- Died: 17 November 1973 (aged 79); Velber, West Germany
- Known for: Painting
- Movement: New Objectivity, Nazi art

Adolf Wissel (19 April 1894 – 17 November 1973) was a German painter. He was one of the official artists of Nazism.

== Biography ==
He was born the son of a farmer in Velber, near Hanover, and first attended the Humboldtgymnasium in Hanover until he completed his secondary school leaving certificate. He then studied at the local arts and crafts school, from 1911 to 1914, especially under Richard Schlösser, to which Wissel remained associated throughout his life.

After studying at the Kassel Art Academy in the early 1920s, he returned to Velber near Hanover in 1924. There he achieved his first regional recognition, before 1933. His works from this time are from a style similar to New Objectivity. As a painter of the rural world, he achieved some success during the National Socialist era. In particular, his painting of the Kalenberg Farming Family (1938–1939), was widely exhibited and reproduced.

Wissel's paintings were exhibited several times in the Große Deutsche Kunstausstellung in the Haus der Kunst, in Munich, from 1939 to 1943. In 1939, he received an honorary professorship from Hitler. In 1944, Wissel was included in the Gottbegnadeten list of the Reich Ministry for Propaganda.

A painter in the genre of Nazi folk art, the idea was that his paintings should depict the simple, natural life of the farming people. The phrase 'union with the soil' describes well the subject of his art. Wissel was the painter of idealised farming life for predominantly urban viewers. These paintings were part of the Nazis' 'blood and soil' campaign, designed to associate the ideas of health, family and motherhood with the country. Wissel painted many paintings in this style, but his work also contains subtle distortions and accentuations influenced by expressionism and New Objectivity.

He continued his career after the end of World War II, in a discrete, apolitical manner. Irmela Wilckens and Claudia Rump wrote on him:

There is evidence that Adolf Wissel did not significantly change his style or choice of motifs in 1933. He can hardly be accused of purposefully adapting to the new National Socialist rulers. But like so many other Germans, he was a participant and also a beneficiary of National Socialism in Germany. Until his death in 1973, he saw himself as an apolitical painter who simply pursued his profession. Whether intentionally or not, whether consciously or unconsciously, together with the majority of Germans, he supported the National Socialist system – with fatal consequences for Germany and Europe.

He died in Velber in 1973, aged 79 years old. Wissel artwork was subject of two major exhibitions, a memorial exhibition held at the Historisches Museum Hannover, in 1974, and at the Heimatmuseum Seelze in 2012.
