= Josefa Berens-Totenohl =

German writer and painter

Josefa Berens-Totenohl (30 March 1891, in Grevenstein, Sauerland – 6 June 1969) was a German writer and painter. She was the daughter of a blacksmith. First she became a teacher, but later worked as a writer and painter and made elaborate tapestries. Her romantic peasant novels were very popular in Nazi Germany; although she never joined the Nazi Party, and the novels had no ideological overtones, their praise of peasant virtue, rootedness, and strength were acceptable to the party.

== See also ==
- List of German painters
