= Ferdinand Liebermann =

German sculptor

- Born: 15 January 1883; Judenbach, Germany
- Died: 28 November 1941 (aged 58); Munich, Germany
- Education: Academy of Fine Arts
- Known for: Numerous state commissions

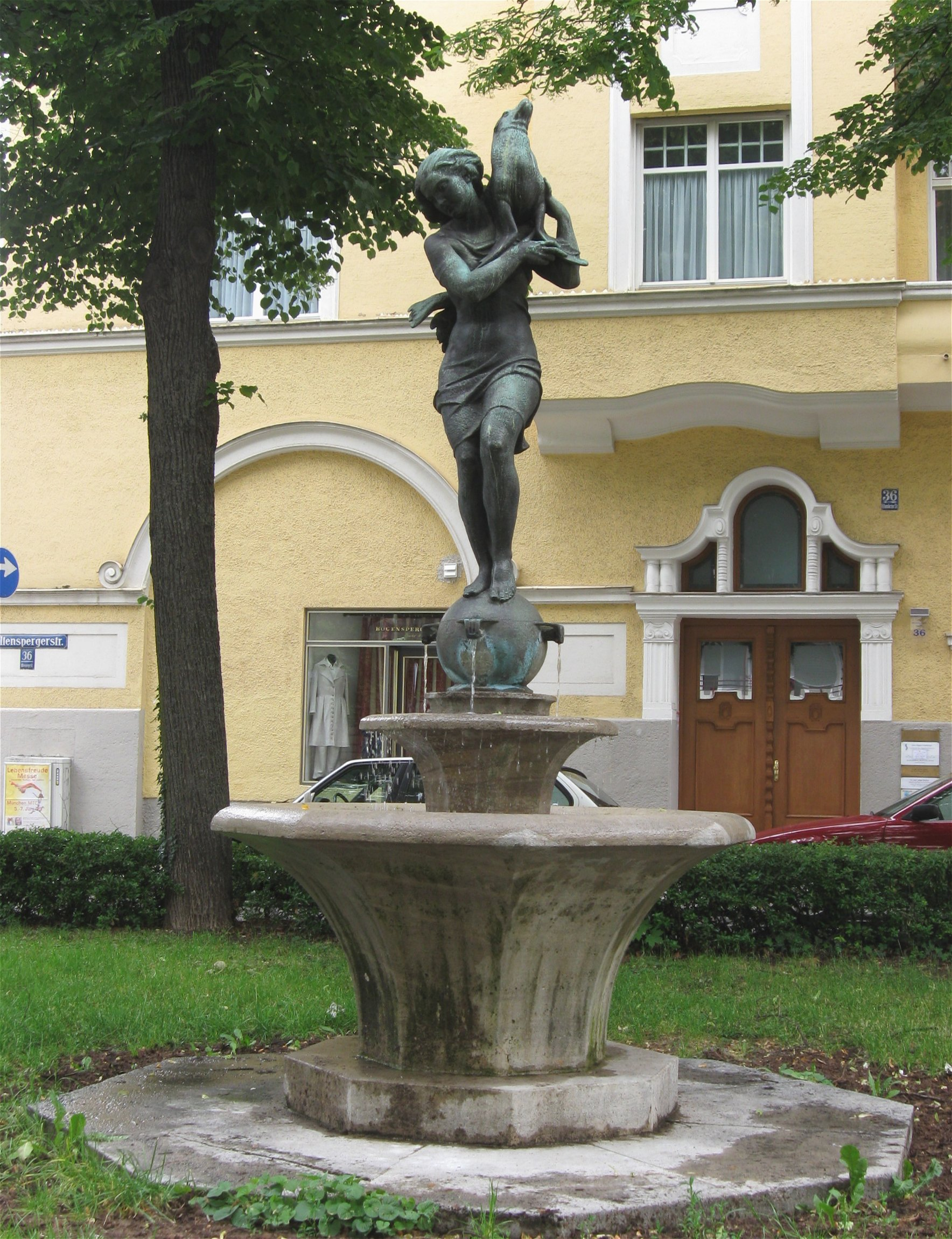
Fountain, Girl with Seal, 1930, Hiltenspergerstraße, Munich

Ferdinand Liebermann (15 January 1883 – 28 November 1941) was a German sculptor.

Liebermann was educated at the Academy of Fine Arts in Munich. During the Third Reich he received numerous state commissions and served as artistic adviser to the city council of Munich. He sculpted numerous portrait busts of Hitler, including one for the Munich Rathaus. At the "Great German Art Exhibitions" (Große Deutsche Kunstausstellungen) in the Haus der Kunst he exhibited a total of 16 works. He also completed a bronze bust of Hitler's niece Geli Raubal, from which Hitler had numerous copies made for display in his residences.
