= Werner Beumelburg =

German writer (1899–1963)

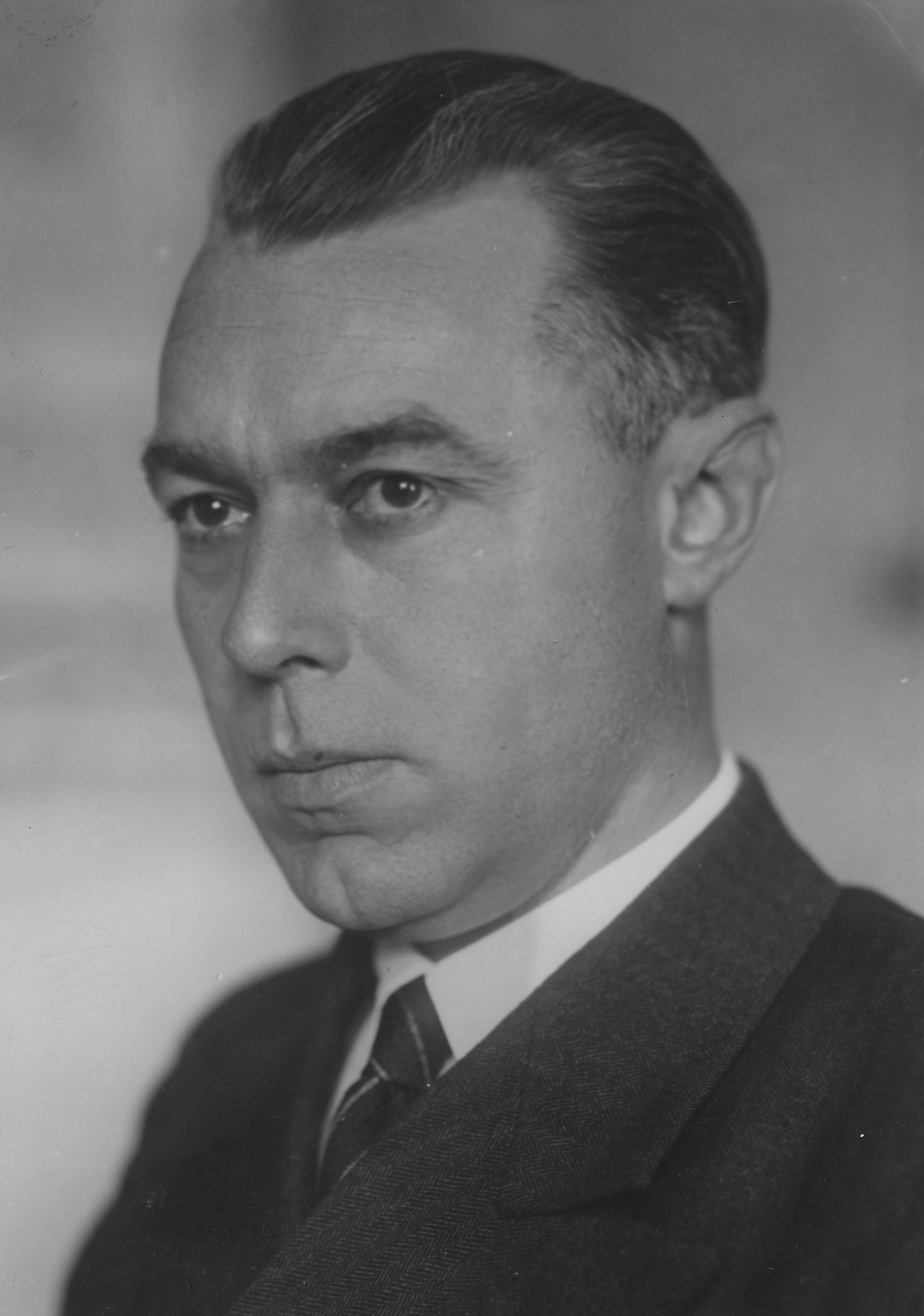
- Beumelburg in 1944
- Born: 19 February 1899; Traben-Trarbach, Kingdom of Prussia, German Empire
- Died: 9 March 1963 (aged 64); Würzburg, Bavaria, West Germany
- Occupations: Journalist, writer

Werner Beumelburg (19 February 1899 – 9 March 1963) was a German journalist and writer.

== Life ==
His brother was German writer Walther Beumelburg (1894–1944). He went to school in Traben-Trabach. In World War I he was soldier and fought in Battle of Verdun. Beumelburg got Iron Cross. After World War I he studied history and public administration in Cologne. Since 1921 he wrote as journalist for German newspaper Deutsche Soldatenzeitung. Then he worked as journalist in Berlin for newspaper Deutsche Allgemeine Zeitung and since 1924 for newspaper Düsseldorfer Nachrichten in Düsseldorf. Beumelburg wrote several books. In October 1933, Beumelburg signed Gelöbnis treuester Gefolgschaft.

== Works by Beumelburg ==
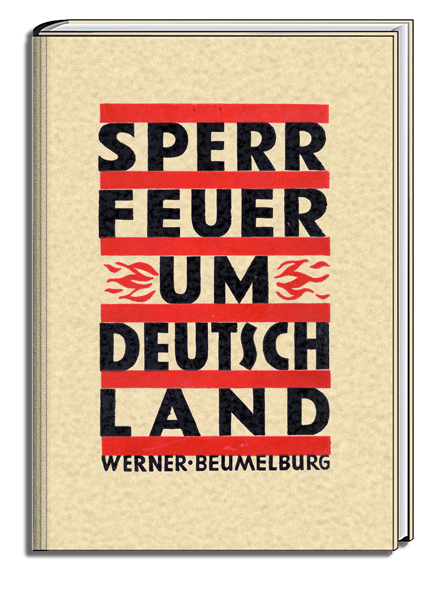
Sperrfeuer um Deutschland (1929)

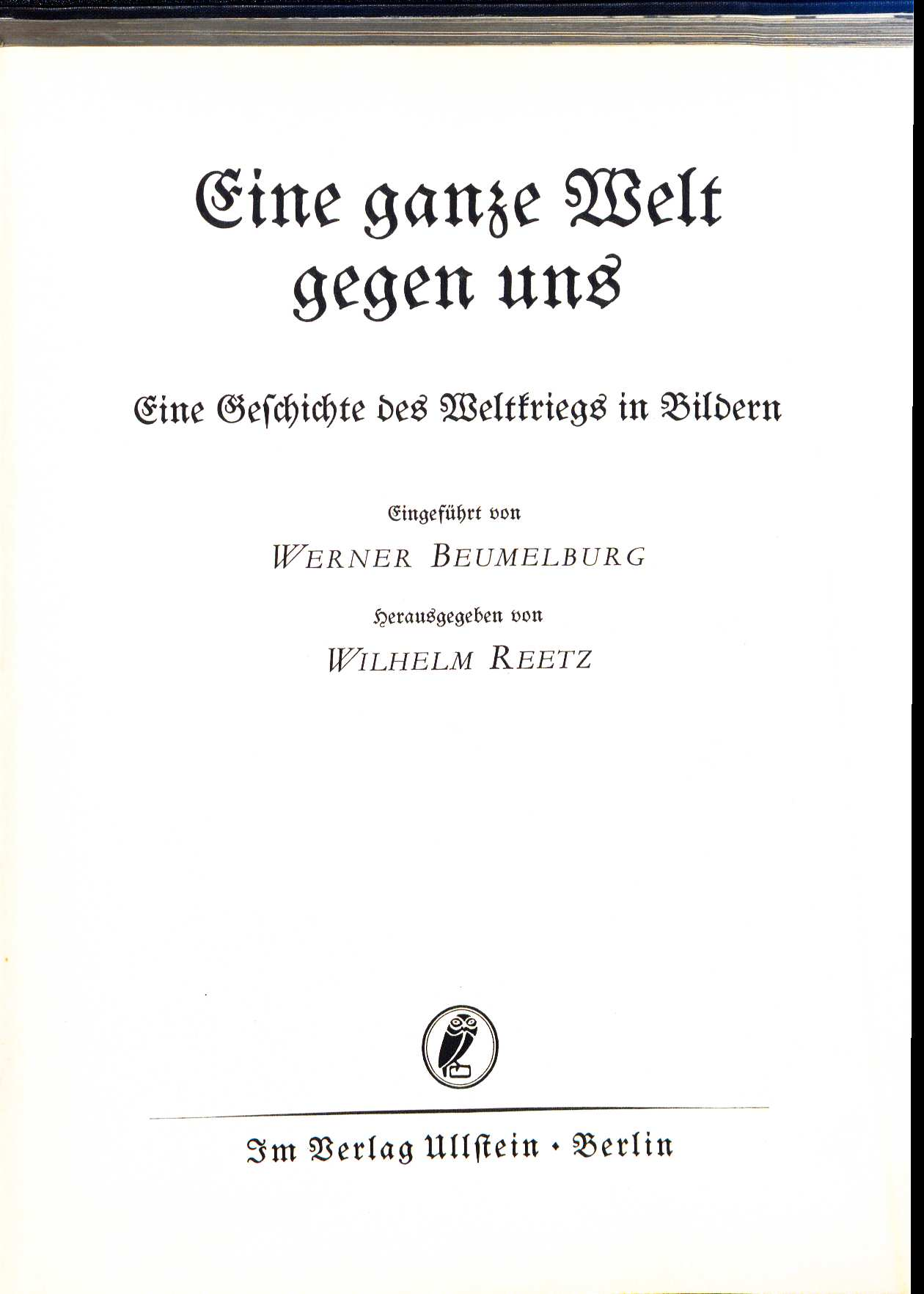
Eine ganze Welt gegen uns (1934)

- Douaumont (1923)
- Ypern 1914 (1925)
- Loretto (1927)
- Flandern 1917 (1928)
- Die stählernen Jahre (1929)
- Sperrfeuer um Deutschland (1929)
- Die Gruppe Bosemüller (Der große Roman der Frontsoldaten) (1930)
- Der Strom (1930)
- Der Kuckuck und die zwölf Apostel, Roman (1931)
- Deutschland in Ketten, Von Versailles bis zum Young-Plan (1931)
- Bismarck gründet das Reich (1932)
- Das jugendliche Reich. Reden und Aufsätze zur Zeitwende (1933)
- Friedrich II. von Hohenstaufen (1934)
- Wilhelm Reetz (ed.), Werner Beumelburg: Eine ganze Welt gegen uns. Eine Geschichte des Weltkriegs in Bildern. Berlin : Ullstein (1934)
- Preußische Novelle (1935)
- Kaiser und Herzog. Kampf zweier Geschlechter um Deutschland (1936)
- Die Hengstwiese. Novelle (1937)
- Reich und Rom. Oldenburg (1937)
- Der König und die Kaiserin. Friedrich der Große und Maria Theresia. Gerhard Stalling Verlag (1938)
- Mont Royal. Ein Buch vom himmlischen und vom irdischen Reich (1938)
- Österreich und das Reich der Deutschen: kurze Geschichte des Großdeutschen Reiches (1938)
- Kampf um Spanien (1939)
- Sieg im Osten. So schlugen wir die Russen 1914/17 (1939)
- Von 1914 bis 1939. Sinn und Erfüllung des Weltkriegs (1940)
- Geschichten vom Reich (1941)
- Reich und Rom (1943)
- Hundert Jahre sind wie ein Tag. Roman einer Familie. Stalling-Verlag, Oldenburg (1950)
- Nur Gast auf dunkler Erde (1951)
- Jahre ohne Gnade (1952)
- Das Kamel und das Nadelöhr (1957)
- … und einer blieb am Leben (1958)
- König Nobels letzte Reise (not published)

== Awards ==
- 1936: Literaturpreis der Reichshauptstadt Berlin
- 1937: Art award by Deutschen Westmark
- 1963: Förderpreis des Erzählerpreises of newspaper Stern for König Nobels letzte Reise
- Honorary citizenship of city Traben-Trarbach
