= Conrad Hommel =

German painter

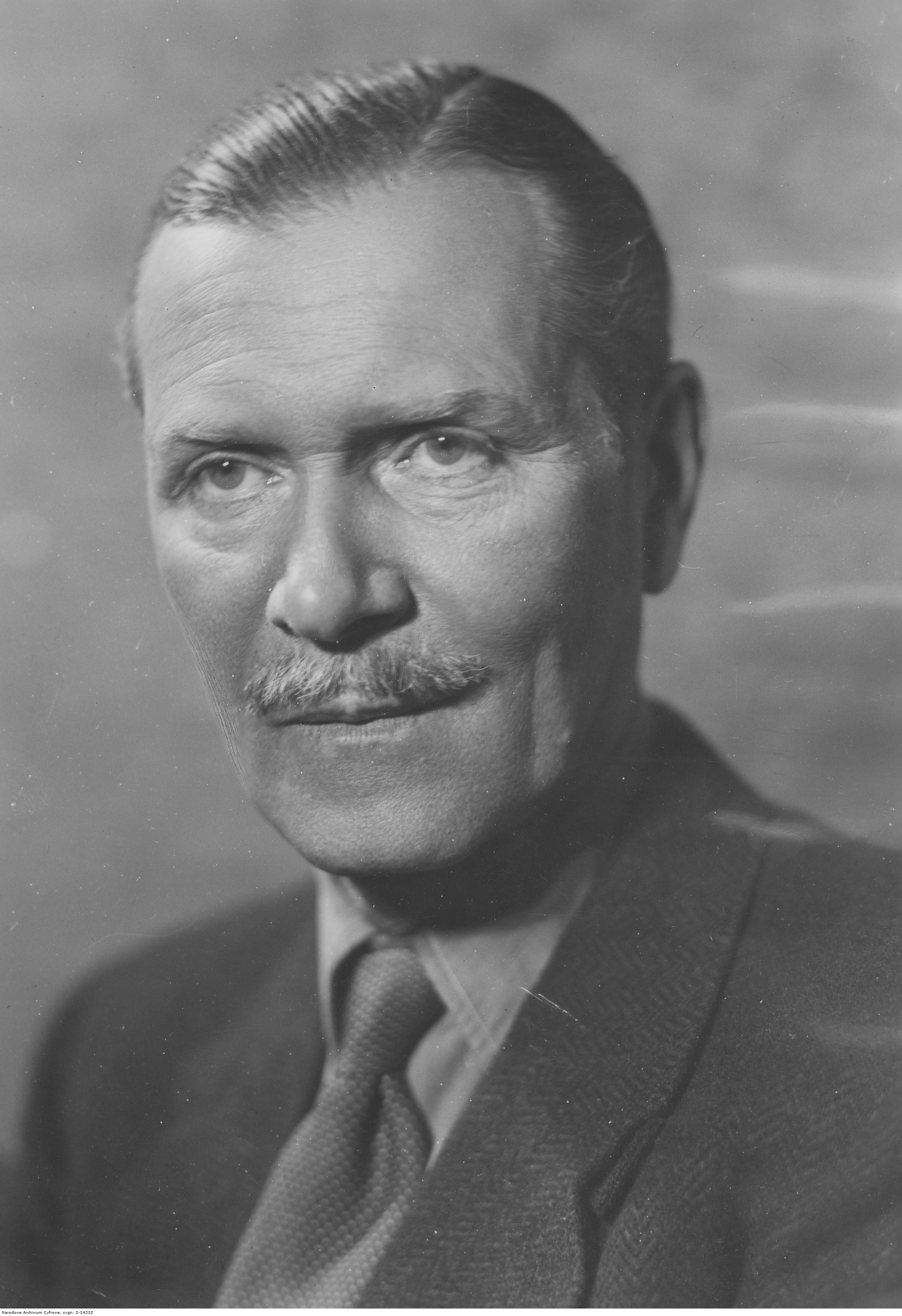
- Hommel in 1943
- Born: 16 February 1883; Mainz, Grand Duchy of Hesse, German Empire
- Died: 11 November 1971 (aged 88); Eutin, West Germany
- Known for: Painting
- Movement: Realism; Nazi art

Conrad Hommel (16 February 1883 – 11 November 1971) was a German painter. He was best known for his portraits of leading German entrepreneurs such as Max Grundig, Herbert Quandt, and politicians such as Adolf Hitler, Hermann Göring and Paul von Hindenburg.

== Life ==
Hommel was born in Mainz, where his father was a counselor. His sister married Albert Friedrich Speer and would be the mother of architect Albert Speer. Hommel married Carolina Schultheiss (1869–1938), divorced of the painter Georg Schuster Woldan, in 1908. He became stepfather to her daughter, Eva van Hoboken (1905–1987), who took the name Eva Hommel.

In 1908, Hommel studied in the studio of the French academic painter Jean-Paul Laurens in Paris. He returned to Germany the following year, joining the Munich Academy on 19 October 1909, where he studied painting with Hugo von Habermann, a leading name of the Munich Secession. Hommel became a member and later president of the Munich Secession. He became a teacher in 1928. He gained recognition during the Weimar Republic as a portrait painter, doing the portraits of personalities such as Friedrich Ebert and Albert Einstein.

After the Nazis took power in 1933, modern art was banned as Degenerate art, while Hommel's naturalist and realist style brought him the favour of the new regime, which made him one of the official painters of Nazi Germany.

Hommel was represented several times at the Great German Art Exhibitions that took place at the House of German Art, in Munich. In the 1937 exhibition, he showed several works, including portraits of Field Marshal August von Mackensen and Reich Minister Hjalmar Schacht. He was given the Lenbach Prize in 1936. In 1939, he became director of a painting class at the Berlin Academy of Art. He married Barbara von Kalckreuth the same year. He continued to be in favour of the leading names of the Nazi Germany, being commissioned two portraits of Adolf Hitler, in 1939 and 1940, including the famous The Führer at the Battlefield, which was massively reproduced. He also portrayed Heinrich Himmler and Hermann Göring in a hunter outfit. He participated at the German Artists and the SS exhibitions that took place in Wrocław and Salzburg in 1944. In the final stages of World War II, he was added to the Gottbegnadeten list of the most important artists to be kept from the war effort, in August 1944.

After the war, he was accused of being a Nazi activist and beneficiary at a Denazification court, in Munich, on 9 July 1948, but the complaint was withdrawn after a month. He continued his career the following years, and did portraits of several economic leaders of the Federal Republic of Germany.

Hommel died on 11 November 1971, in the Sielbeck district of Eutin, Germany.
