= Hermann Eris Busse =

German novelist and literary critic

Hermann Eris Busse (9 March 1891, Freiburg im Breisgau – 15 August 1947) was a German novelist and literary critic. He is best known for his Black Forest novels and his biography of the 17th-century German writer Hans Jakob Christoph von Grimmelshausen.

== Major works ==
- Bauernadel (trilogy of novels), 1930.
- Der Letzte Bauer (novel), 1930.
- Mein Leben (autobiography), 1935.
- Grimmelshausen, 1939.
- Glorian und die Frevlerin (stories), 1944.
