= Documenta 1 =

Art exhibition in Kassel, Germany

The first Documenta took place between 15 July and 18 September 1955 in Kassel, West Germany. The artistic director was Arnold Bode. It was considered the largest and most extensive exhibition of modern art in West Germany since the end of the Second World War.

== Participants ==
A
Josef Albers	Kenneth Armitage	Jean Arp	René Victor Auberjonois
B
Giacomo Balla	Willi Baumeister	Max Beckmann	Hermann Blumenthal	Reg Butler
Eduard Bargheer	Mirko Basaldella	Max Bill	Umberto Boccioni
Ernst Barlach	Jean Bazaine	Renato Birolli	Camille Bombois
Afro Basaldella	André Beaudin	Roger Bissière	Georges Braque
C
Alexander Calder	Alexander Camaro	Heinrich Campendonk	Marc Chagall	Roberto Crippa
Massimo Campigli	Giuseppe Capogrossi	Carlo Carrà	Giorgio de Chirico
Felice Casorati	Bruno Cassinari	Lynn Chadwick	Antonio Corpora
D
Robert Delaunay	Charles Despiau	Theo van Doesburg	Raoul Dufy
André Derain	Otto Dix	Raymond Duchamp-Villon
E
Max Ernst
F
Joseph Fassbender	Lyonel Feininger	Ernesto de Fiori	Xaver Fuhr
G
Naum Gabo	Fritz Glarner	HAP Grieshaber
Werner Gilles	Julio González	Juan Gris
H
Hans Hartung	Erich Heckel	Werner Heldt	Auguste Herbin
Karl Hartung	Bernhard Heiliger	Barbara Hepworth	Karl Hofer
J
Alexej von Jawlensky
K
Wassily Kandinsky	Ernst Ludwig Kirchner	Oskar Kokoschka
Ludwig Kasper	Paul Klee	František Kupka
L
Berto Lardera	Henri Laurens	Fernand Léger	Kurt Lehmann	Wilhelm Lehmbruck
M
August Macke	Marino Marini	Otto Meyer-Amden	Giorgio Morandi	Gabriele Münter
Alberto Magnelli	André Masson	Joan Miró	Mattia Moreni	Zoran Mušič
Aristide Maillol	Ewald Mataré	Paula Modersohn-Becker	Ennio Morlotti
Alfred Manessier	Henri Matisse	Amedeo Modigliani	Richard Mortensen
Franz Marc	Georg Meistermann	Piet Mondrian	Georg Muche
Gerhard Marcks	Hans Mettel	Henry Moore	Otto Mueller
N
Ernst Wilhelm Nay	Rolf Nesch	Ben Nicholson	Emil Nolde
P
Max Pechstein	Pablo Picasso	Filippo De Pisis
Antoine Pevsner	Édouard Pignon	Hans Purrmann
R
Otto Ritschl	Kurt Roesch	Georges Rouault
Emy Roeder	Christian Rohlfs	Henri Rousseau
S
Giuseppe Santomaso	Gérard Ernest Schneider	William Scott	Mario Sironi
Edwin Scharff	Wols	Séraphine (Louis) de Senlis	Pierre Soulages
Oskar Schlemmer	Kurt Schwitters	Gino Severini	Toni Stadler
Karl Schmidt-Rottluff	Scipione (Gino Bonichi)	Gustave Singier	Graham Sutherland
T
Sophie Taeuber-Arp	Pierre Tal-Coat	Hann Trier	Heinz Trökes
U
Hans Uhlmann
V
Victor Vasarely	Alberto Viani	Jacques Villon	Maurice de Vlaminck
Emilio Vedova	Marie Héléne Vieira da Silva	Louis Vivin	Friedrich Vordemberge-Gildewart
W
Theodor Werner	Walter Kurt Wiemken	Hans Wimmer	Fritz Winter	Gustav H. Wolff
