= Peter Foerster =

German painter

Peter Foerster (22 August 1887 – 6 March 1948) was a German painter and draftsman of the New Objectivity.

== Early life ==
Ludwig Peter Foerster was born in Aachen, where he attended the School of Arts and Crafts from 1905 until 1908. He then attended the University of Fine Arts Berlin until 1911. During this time he was in a close relationship with Mies van der Rohe, a friend he had known since his youth.

== Career ==
After World War I Foerster became a member of the Novembergruppe in Berlin and took part in several exhibitions of this group (for instance the Great Berlin Art Exhibitions).

In the 1920s and 1930s he travelled to Italy, Belgium and several German cities.

In 1928 he decorated the German Pavilion for the 1929 World Exhibition in Barcelona. Foerster was probably a close assistant of Mies during this time.

In 1933 Foerster became a member of the group “Die Gemeinschaft” and took part in the group's exhibitions.

From 1934 Foerster was a teacher at the Reimann-School.

After a study-trip to Kassel in 1935, Foerster returned to Berlin. Together with other artists (Werner Heldt, Herbert Tucholski, Käthe Kollwitz, Hermann Blumenthal) he had an atelier in the Ateliergemeinschaft Klosterstrasse.

In 1935 Foerster received Nuremberg's Albrecht Dürer Prize.

In 1936 Foerster received the Rome Award of the Villa Massimo and until September 1937, stayed in Italy.

In 1940 Foerster became director of the Cultural Department (‘Kulturamt’) in Dessau, as well as director of the municipal art collections, and the personal art advisor of mayor Johannes Sander.

In 1940, 1941, and 1942 Foerster took part at the Great German Art Exhibitions in the House of German Art in Munich. In total he exhibited nine works there. At the exhibition of 1940 the watercolor Fuldagasse in Kassel (from 1935, cat.-no. A080) was purchased by Adolf Hitler for 500 Reichsmark.

In 1941 Foerster became a member of the NSDAP.

On 28 February 1943 Foerster's home and atelier in Berlin were destroyed due to air raids. And afterwards on Pentecost, in 1944, his atelier and home in Dessau were destroyed.

On 6 March 1948 Peter Foerster died in a hospital in Frankfurt am Main.
