= Will Lammert =

German sculptor

Will Lammert (5 January 1892 – 30 October 1957) was a German sculptor. In 1959 he was posthumously awarded the National Prize of the German Democratic Republic.

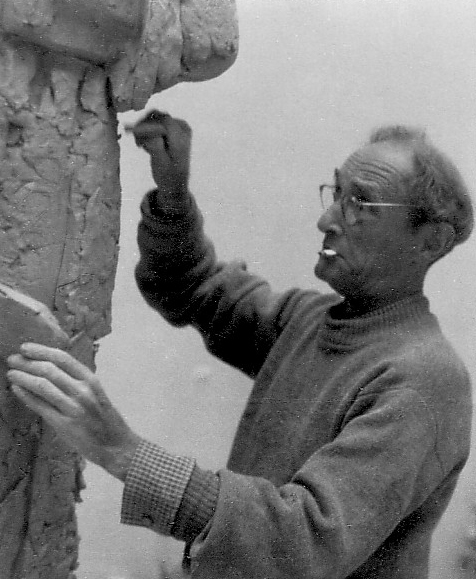
Will Lammert in his studio, 1956

== Life ==
=== Germany (1892–1933) ===
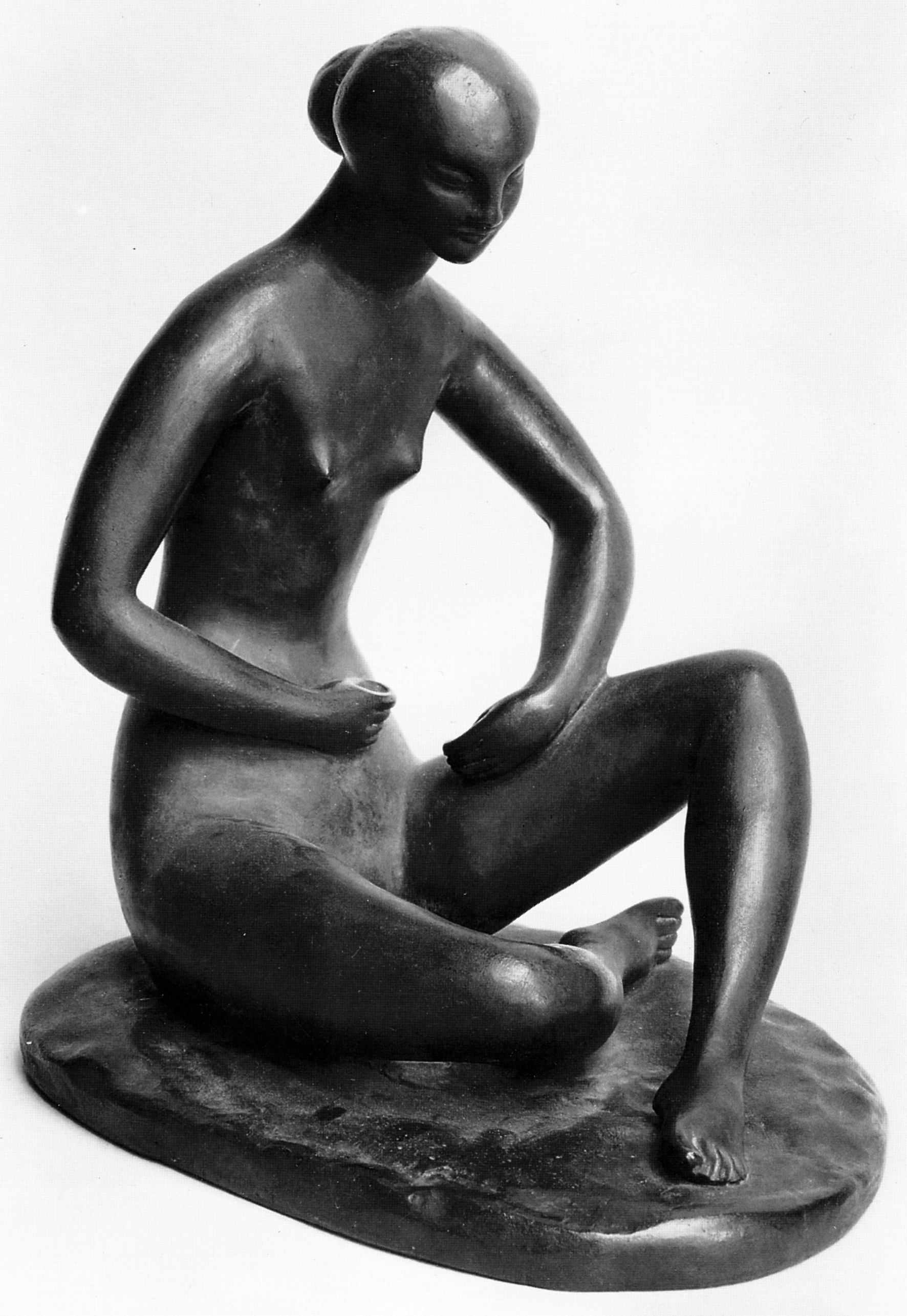
Small Girl Sitting, 1913

Will Lammert was born in Hagen in 1892, the son of a machinist. He completed an apprenticeship as stucco, stone and wood sculptor and initially worked in the studios of the Russian sculptor Moissey Kogan. From 1911 he studied under Richard Luksch at the state Kunstgewerbeschule (school of applied arts) in Hamburg with a scholarship received on the recommendation of the art collector and founder of the Folkwang Museum, Karl Ernst Osthaus. Between 1913 and 1914 he spent time studying in Paris. There he was introduced by his former teacher Moissey Kogan to the sculptors Alexander Archipenko and Otto Freundlich.

In 1915 he served as a soldier in the First World War, during which he was seriously wounded. After the war he attended the College of Ceramics in Höhr, near Koblenz. In the years which followed he worked as a freelance sculptor in the town of his birth, as well as in Düsseldorf and Munich. He also exhibited works in conjunction with the group Das Junge Rheinland, whose members included Otto Dix and Max Ernst. In 1920 he married Hette Meyerbach.

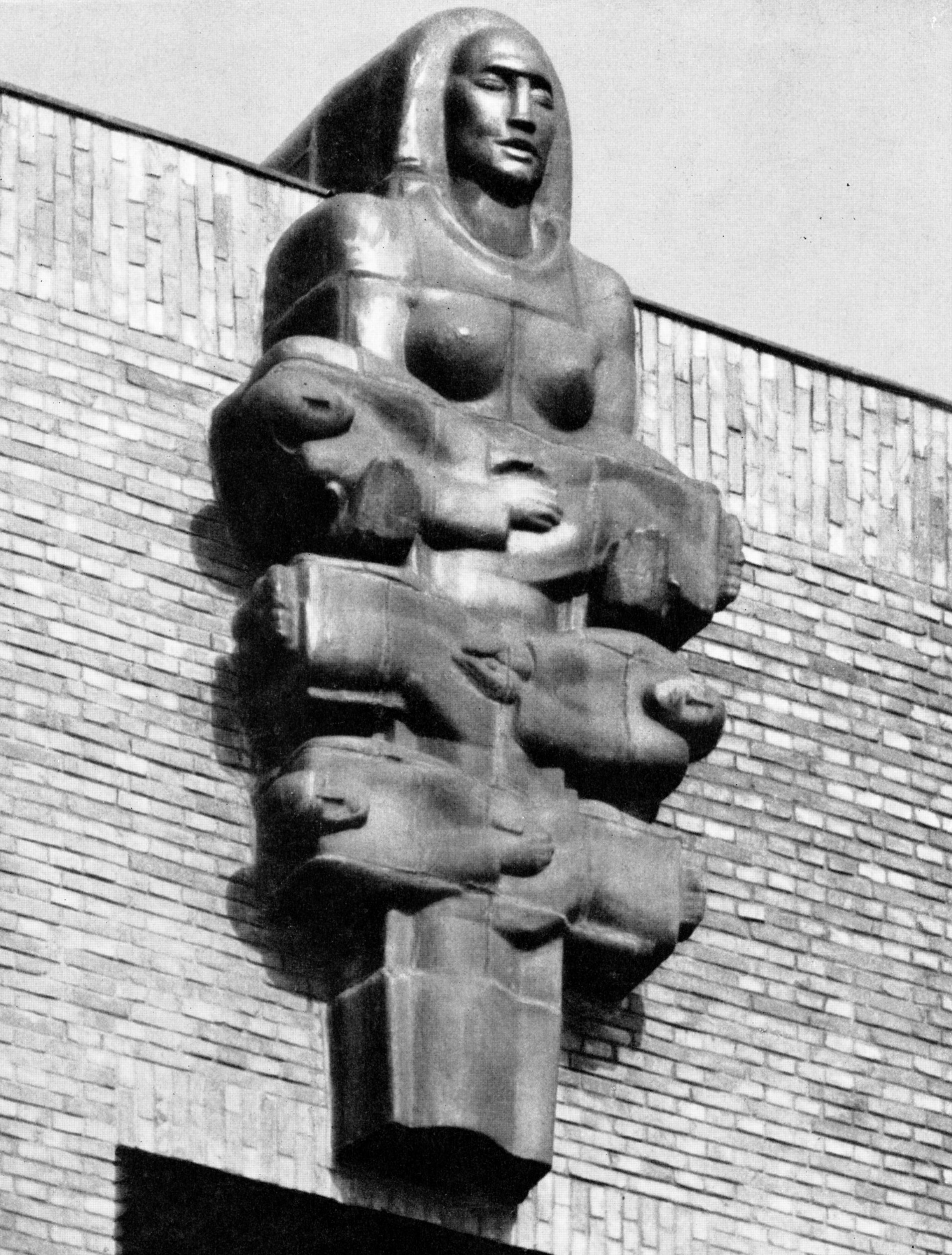
Mutter Erde, 1926 (destroyed)

He moved to Essen in 1922, at the same time as the Folkwang Museum. In Essen, the state sponsored the foundation of the Margarethenhöhe artists colony, where he occupied a studio. He created free-standing and architectural sculptures for buildings designed by the architects Edmund Körner, Georg Metzendorf and Alfred Fischer. Along with his work as an artist he also ran a ceramics workshop. Both Hermann Blumenthal and Fritz Cremer began their artistic careers in his studio. In 1931, on the express recommendation of Max Liebermann, he received a scholarship from the Prussian Academy of Arts to study in Rome, and spent nine months at the Villa Massimo, working alongside the artists Werner Gilles, Ernst Wilhelm Nay and Hermann Blumenthal. In 1932 he joined the KPD, the German Communist Party.

=== Exile (1933–1951) ===
After the Nazis seized power Lammert was sought by the Gestapo on charges of high treason. In the early summer of 1933 he was forced to emigrate via the Netherlands to Paris, his Jewish wife Hette and their two sons Till and Ule following on. For periods he lived in the same building as the German writer Bodo Uhse and publisher Willi Münzenberg. However, in 1934 Lammert was expelled from France and forced to flee again, this time to the Soviet Union. Meanwhile, in Essen the press was stirring up hatred against the "Bolshevist artist with his close Jewish relations" and his "degenerate art". In the years which followed, almost all his works in Germany were destroyed by the Nazis.

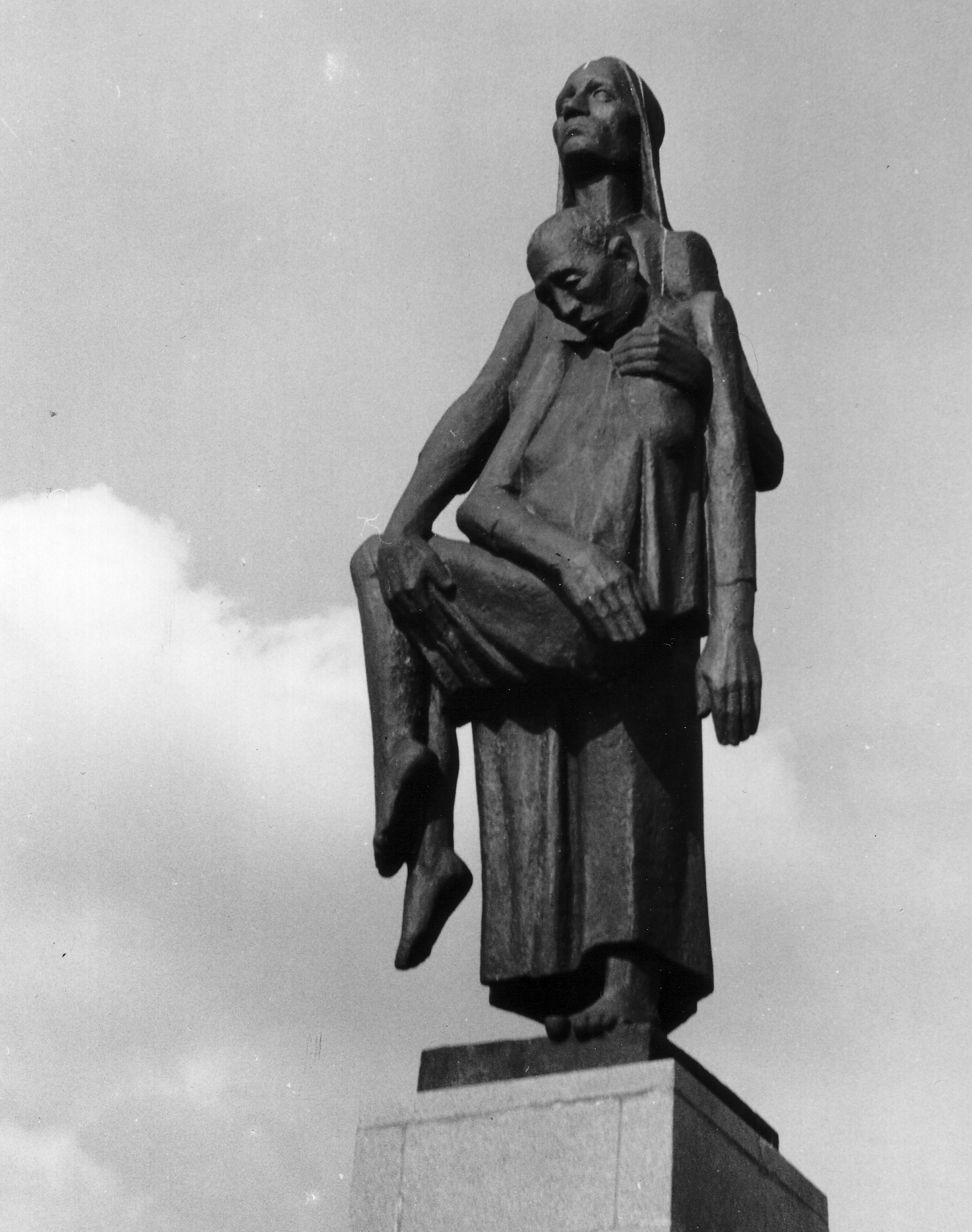
Memorial Tragende, 1959

Despite Lammert's greatest endeavours to find work as a sculptor, efforts which led him all the way to Siberia, there were few opportunities in the Soviet Union for him to practise his art. In 1938 he moved out of Moscow and into the suburb of Peredelkino, where was able to stay in Friedrich Wolf's dacha. He kept in close contact with other German emigres too, such as Johannes R. Becher, Adam Scharrer and Erich Weinert. He worked in various architect's offices and ran drawing groups together with another exiled artist, the painter Heinrich Vogeler. After the attack on the Soviet Union in 1941 he was expelled from the greater Moscow region, this time for being German, and arrived first of all in the Tatar Autonomous Soviet Socialist Republic, where he worked at a "kolkhoz" collective farm. A year later he was conscripted into the Labour Army and brought to Kazan. His exile did not end with the war, however, but was merely converted into a "Special Exile in Perpetuity."

=== Return to Germany (1951–1957) ===
Lammert was only allowed to leave the Soviet Union in December 1951, finally able to return to Germany – to the then East Germany. Prior to this, other returnees, such as Else and Friedrich Wolf, had repeatedly called for him to be given an exit permit. One year later he was elected a full member of the German Academy of the Arts. He died in October 1957 in Berlin, still working on the pieces for the Ravensbrück concentration camp memorial site he had begun in 1954. Lammert was laid to rest in the Pankow III Cemetery in the Niederschönhausen district of Berlin where he had his studio. The National Prize of the German Democratic Republic was awarded to him posthumously in 1959. His wife used the money to set up the Will Lammert Prize, which was awarded by the German Academy of the Arts to numerous young sculptors between the years of 1962 to 1992.

== Works ==
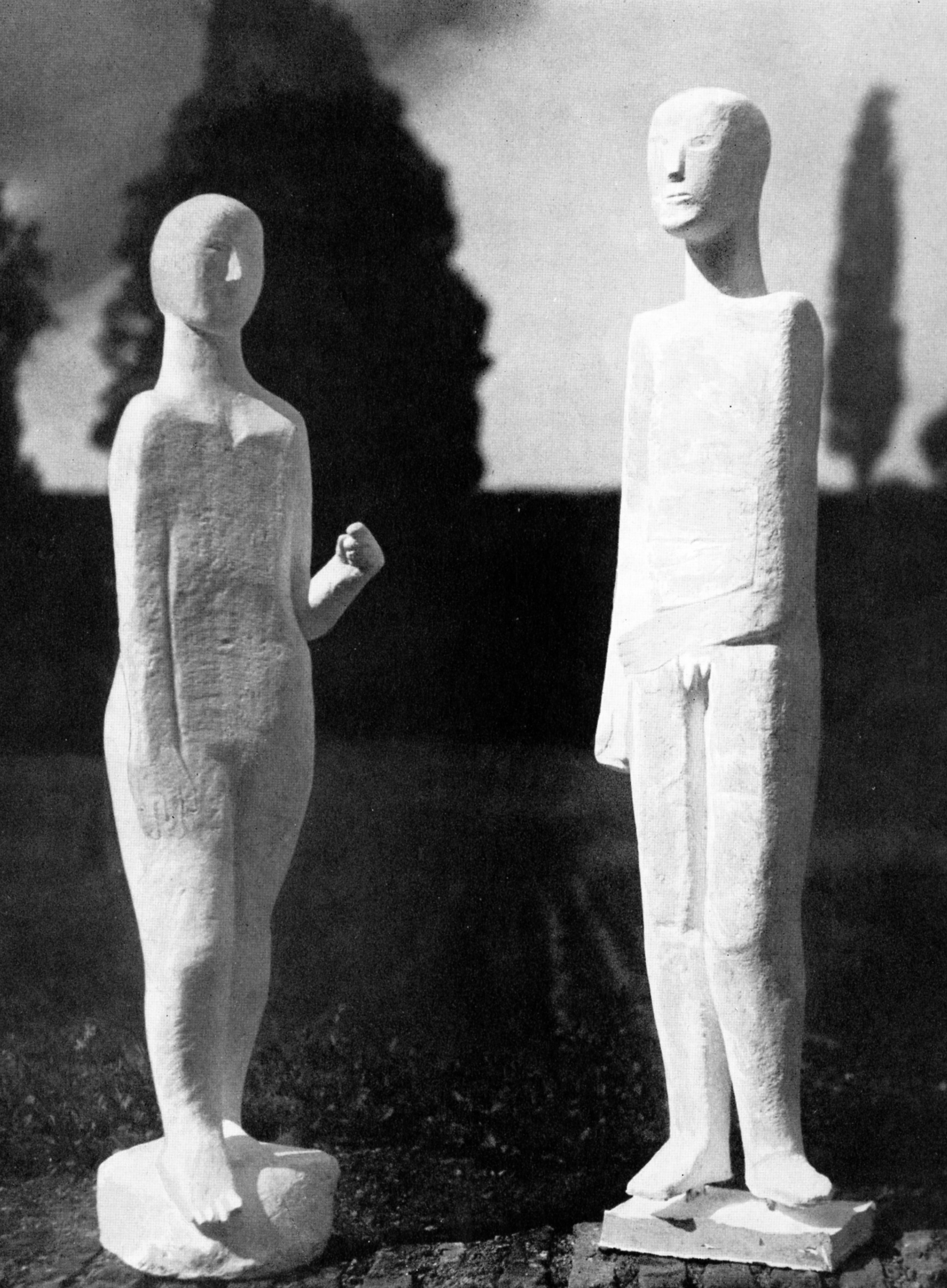
Weiblicher und männlicher Akt, 1931/32 (destroyed)

=== Early works ===
At the age of twenty-two Lammert was already getting attention at the Cologne Werkbund exhibition. Two of his golden figures were removed from the exhibition as being morally offensive. All that remains of them today is a fragment of Kopf einer goldenen Figur (Head of a Golden Figure) from 1914. The other, Kleine Sitzende I (Small Girl Sitting I), had been created prior to that, in 1913. After the First World War he was represented by the gallery owner Alfred Flechtheim, and participated in various exhibitions held by the group Das Junge Rheinland. He created portraits, large standing and reclining female figures and a variety of small-scale sculptures. At the same time he was taking public commissions, including for example Mutter Erde (Mother Earth) in 1926, for the entrance to the South-West Cemetery in Essen, and a memorial to the war dead in Marburg in the form of a lion (1926/27). He returned from his study visit in Italy with Weiblichen und männlichen Akt (Female and Male Figures) from 1932/33. After 1933, Lammert's early work was destroyed almost in its entirety in the run-up to the "Degenerate Art" campaign, on the instigation of its protagonist, Klaus Graf von Baudissin. This part of his output is known to us today primarily through the photographs of Albert Renger-Patzsch and Edgar Jené. Together with some few small sculptures, only the Kleine Liegende (Small Reclining Girl) of 1930, a fragment of Ruth Tobi (1919) and an early version of Karl Ernst Osthaus (1930) remain. Casts of these sculptures can be found today in some museums, including the Nationalgalerie in Berlin, the Germanisches Nationalmuseum in Nuremberg, and in the Smart Museum of Art in Chicago. We also have a series of drawings, made predominately during his study visits to France (1912/13) and Italy (1932).

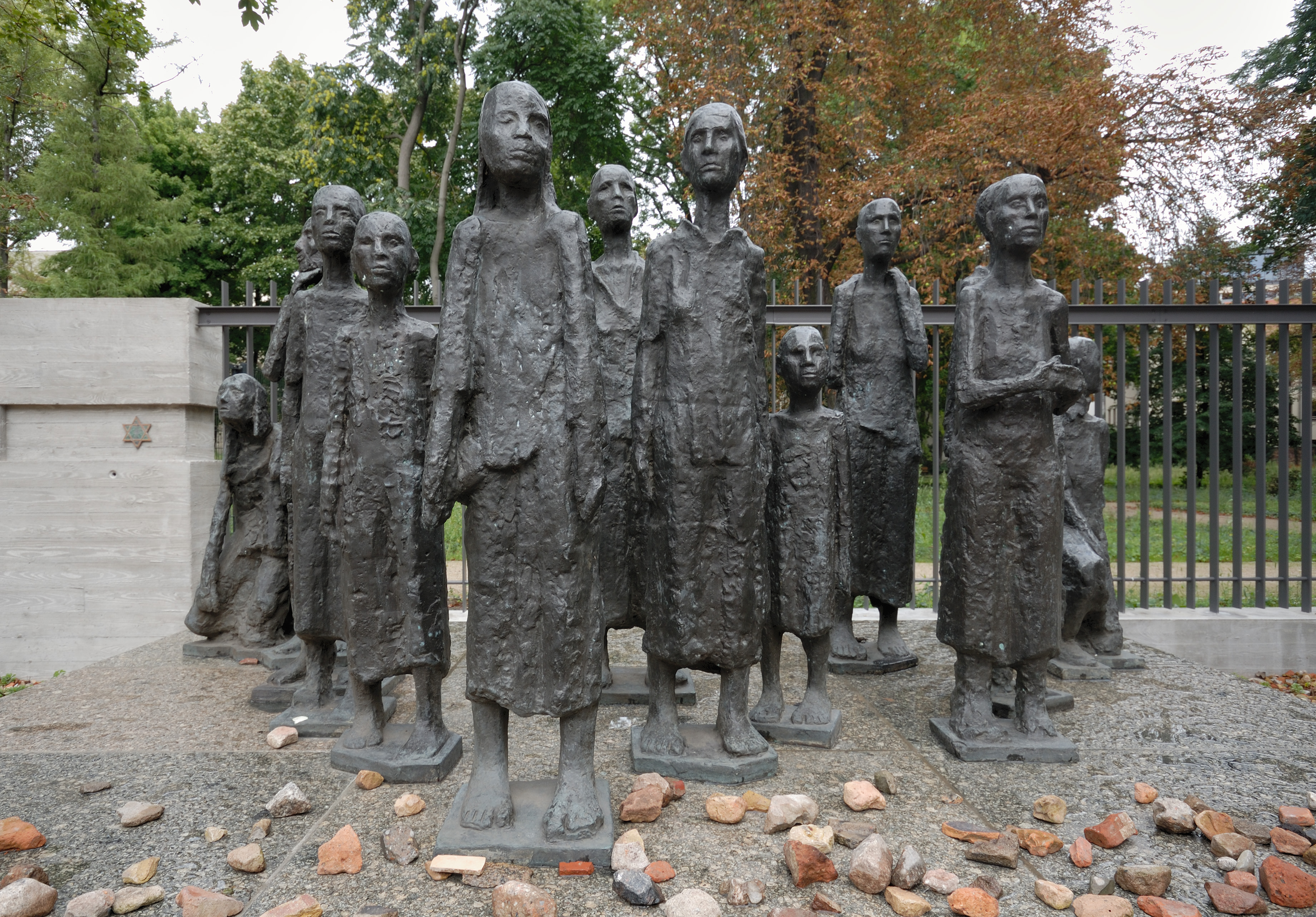
Memorial at the Jewish Cemetery

=== Later works ===
Lammert could only take up his art again after his return from eighteen years of exile. During this period he produced some portrait and memorial sculptures, including figures of Karl Marx (1953), Eduard von Winterstein (1954), Friedrich Wolf (1954), Wilhelm Pieck (1955), and Thomas Müntzer (1956), but in the main he dedicated himself to his composition of the memorial site at the former Ravensbrück concentration camp. After his death, some of Lammert's design was realised. The Tragende (Woman with Burden) from 1957 was enlarged and exhibited on a plinth in 1959. Thirteen sculptures originally intended for the foot of the stele have stood in the Old Jewish Cemetery in Berlin Mitte since 1985 to commemorate the Jewish victims of fascism. This group of figures (arrangement by Mark Lammert) was the first memorial in Berlin to the Jewish victims of the Nazis. A bust of Karl Marx, which was on display in the entrance to Berlin's Humboldt University, was removed at the time of German reunification.

== Exhibitions (selection) ==
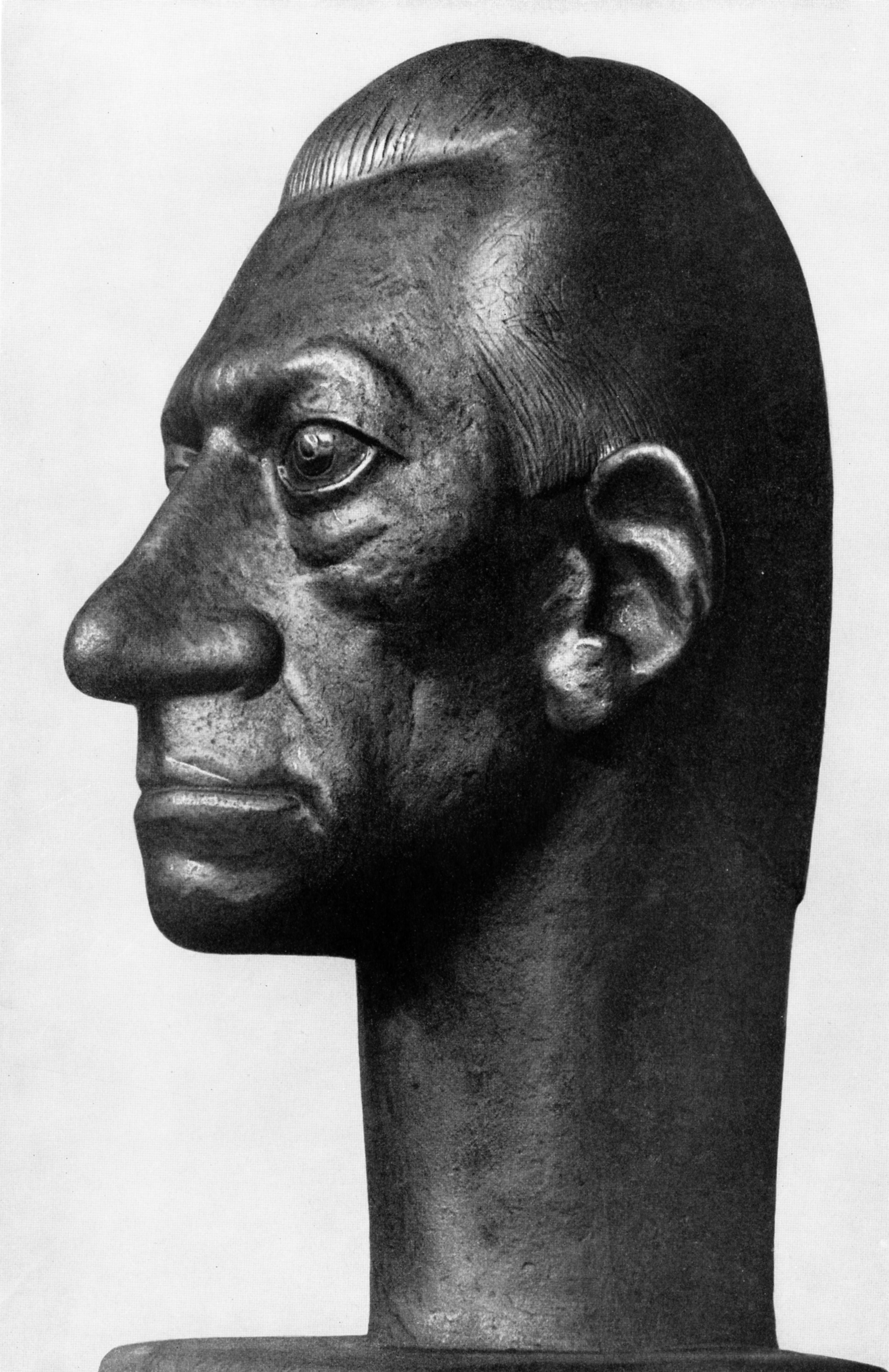
Karl Ernst Osthaus, 1930 (destroyed)

- 1913 „Will Lammert – Zeichnungen“, Museum Folkwang, Hagen
- 1914 Werkbundausstellung, Köln
- 1919 „Auf dem Wege zur Kunst unserer Zeit“, Flechtheim Gallery, Düsseldorf
- 1919 Das Junge Rheinland, Kunsthalle Düsseldorf
- 1930 „Westfälische Moderne“, et al. Hagen
- 1931 Deutscher Künstlerbund, Essen
- 1959 „Will Lammert – Gedächtnisausstellung“, Deutsche Akademie der Künste, Berlin
- 1973 „Will Lammert und die Will-Lammert-Preisträger“, Exhibition center at the Fernsehturm, Berlin
- 1977 „Will Lammert (1892–1957)“, Orangerieschloss, Potsdam
- 1981/82 "Will Lammert - Plastik und Zeichnungen 1910-1933", Kunsthalle Weimar/Kunstgalerie Gera
- 1988 „Will Lammert - Plastik und Zeichnungen“, Kloster Unser Lieben Frauen, Magdeburg
- 1988/89 „Und lehrt sie: Gedächtnis“, Ephraim-Palais, East Berlin, Martin-Gropius-Bau, West Berlin
- 1990 „Künstler für Menschlichkeit – Engagierte Kunst 1945-89“, DDR-Kulturzentrum, Paris
- 1992 „Will Lammert (1892 -1957) - Plastik und Zeichnungen“, Akademie der Künste, Berlin
- 1999/2000 "Avantgarden in Westfalen?", Wanderausstellungen, et al. Ahlen
- 1999/2000 „Sculpture for a New Europe“, Henry Moore Foundation, Leeds
- 2003 „The early modernist German art collection“, Smart Museum of Art, Chicago
- 2003 „Kunst in der DDR“, Neue Nationalgalerie, Berlin
- 2009 „Kalter Krieg“, Germanisches Nationalmuseum, Nürnberg

== Public collections (selection) ==
- Neue Nationalgalerie, Berlin
- Germanisches Nationalmuseum, Nürnberg
- Folkwang Museum, Essen
- Kloster Unser Lieben Frauen, Magdeburg
- Kunstmuseum Moritzburg Halle (Saale)
- Smart Museum of Art, Chicago

== Awards ==
- 1931 Rome Prize of the Prussian Academy of Arts
- 1959 National Prize of the German Democratic Republic (posthumous)

== Drawings (selection) ==
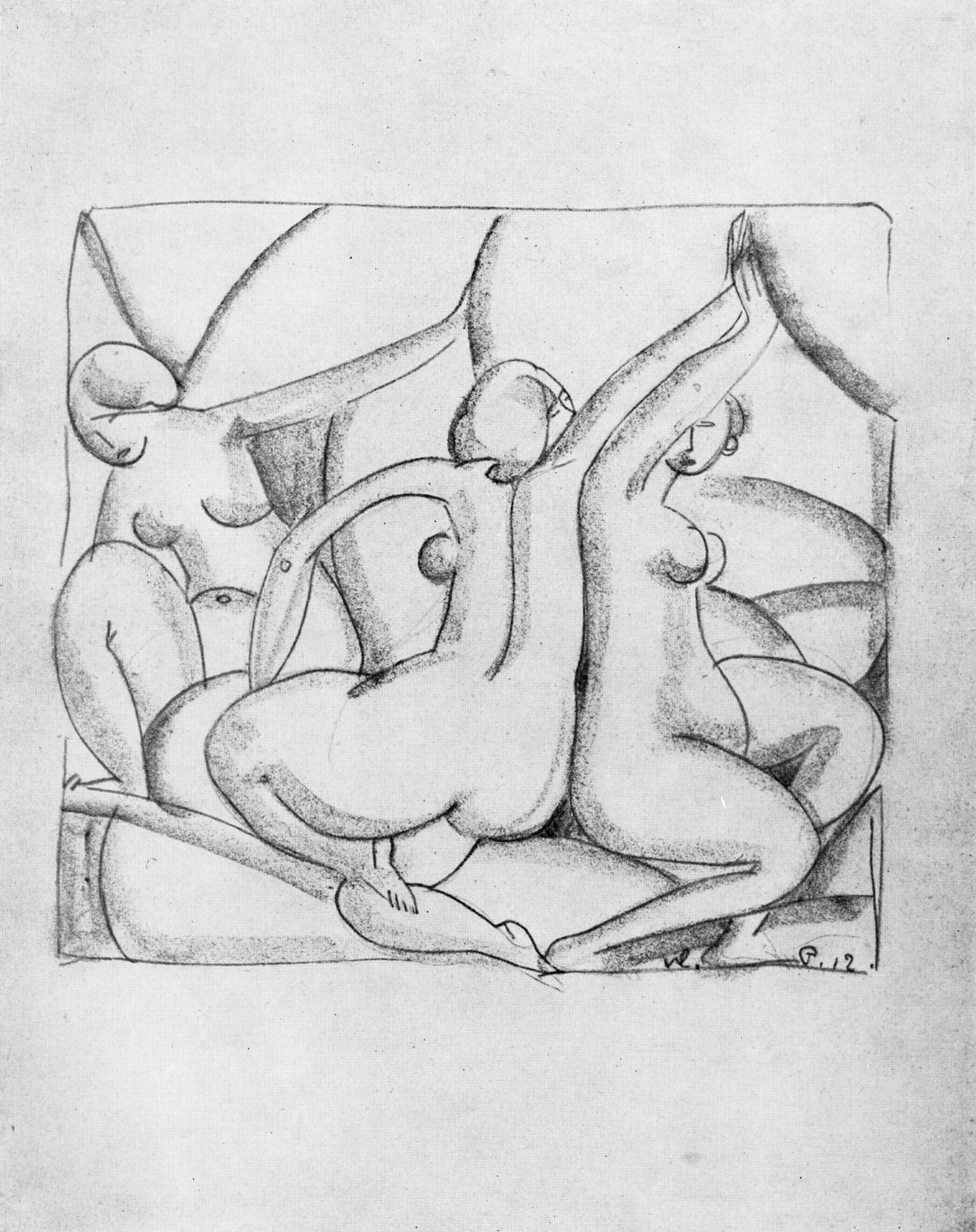
Bildkomposition, 1912

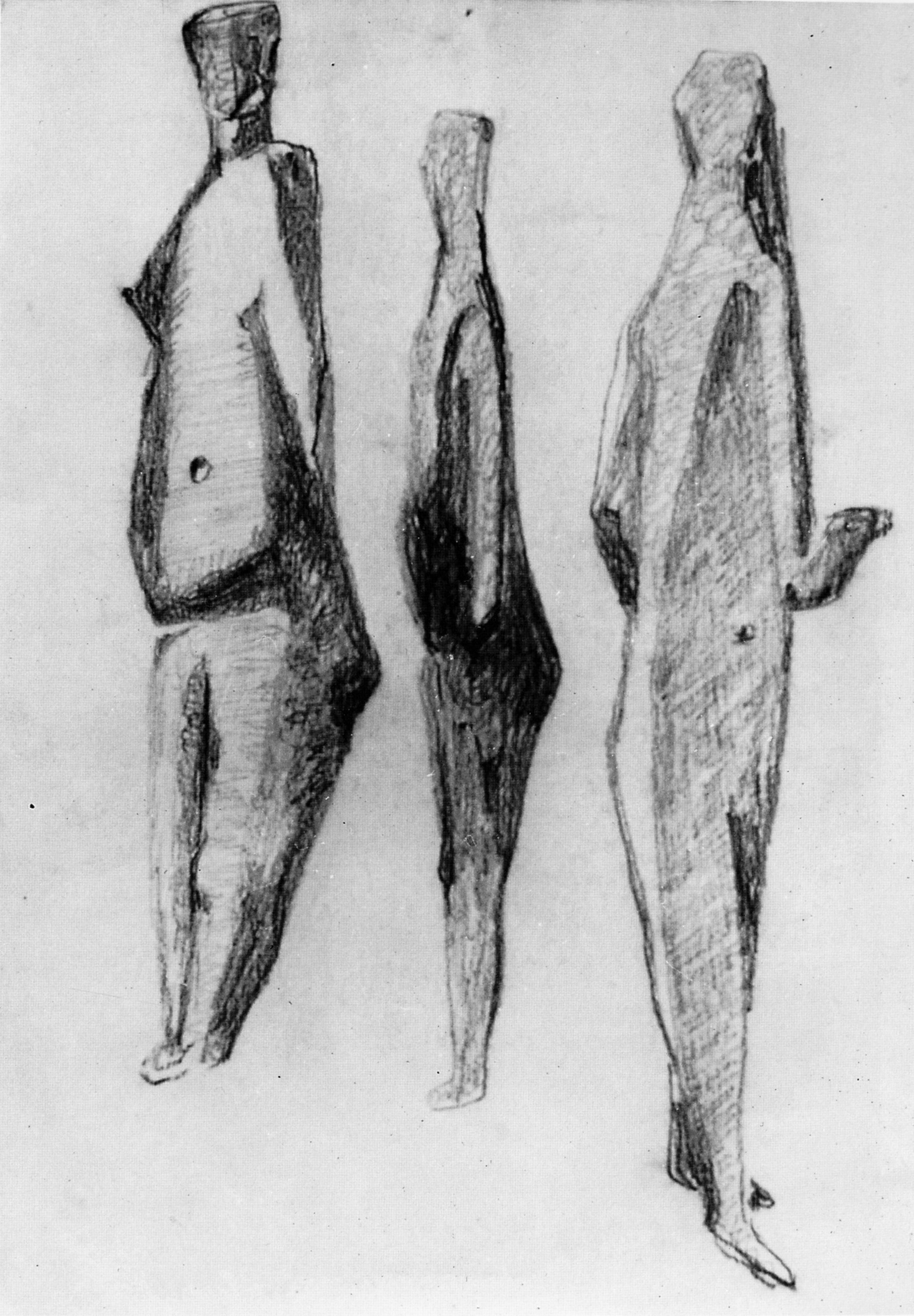
Drei Stehende, 1932

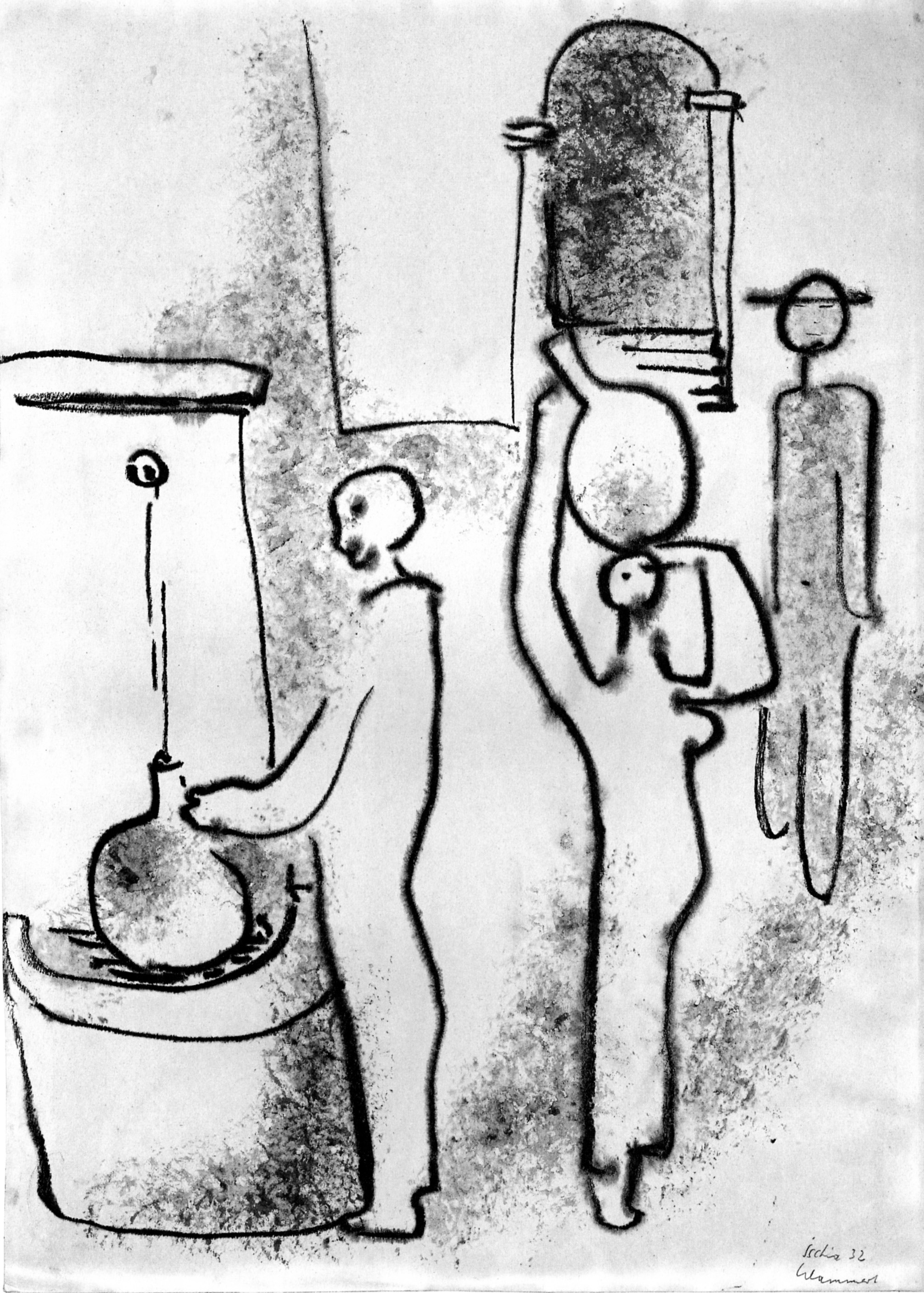
Am Brunnen, 1932

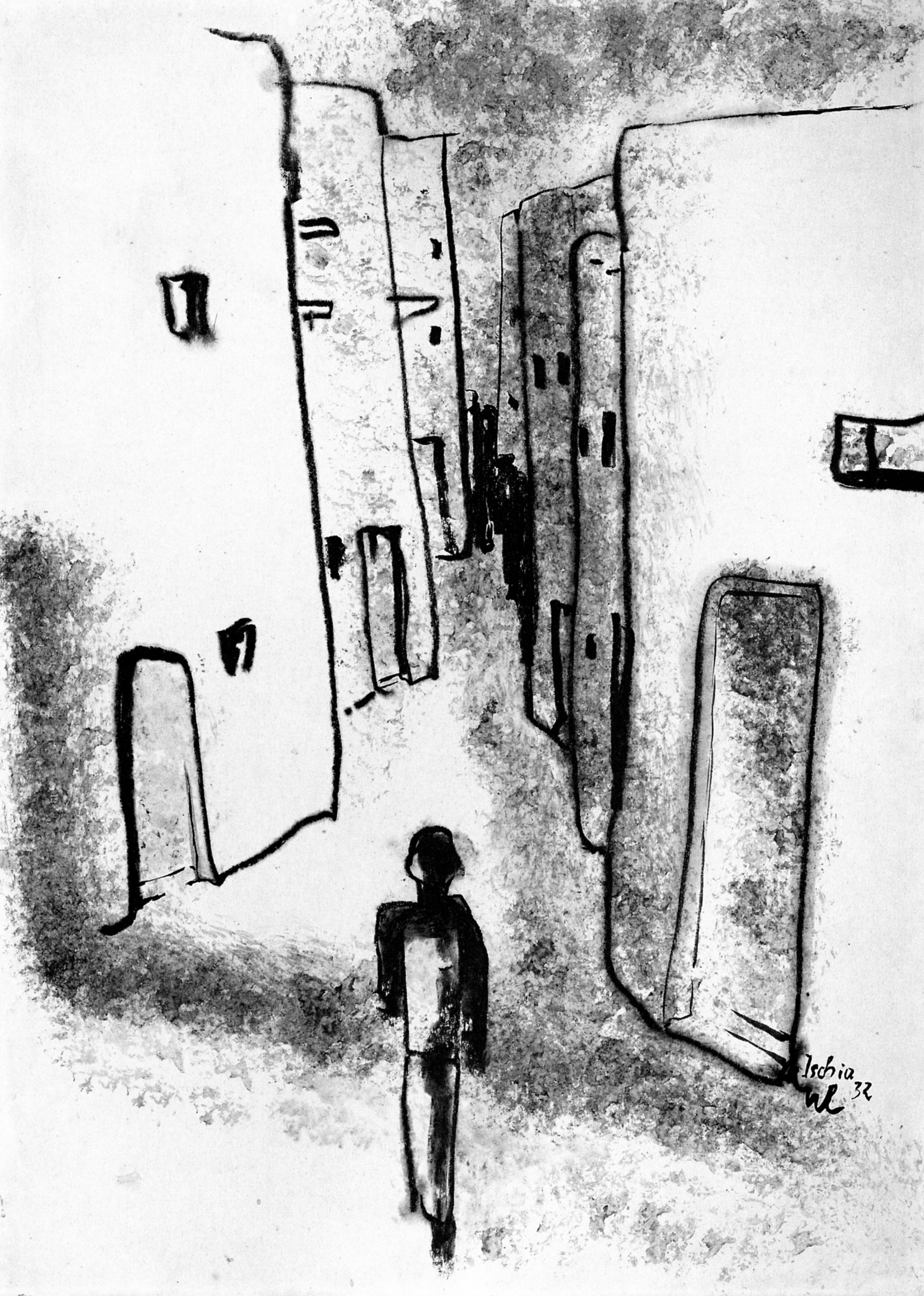
Auf der Straße, 1932

== Literature (selection) ==
- Annita Beloubek-Hammer: Die schönen Gestalten der besseren Zukunft. Die Bildhauerkunst des Expressionismus und ihr geistiges Umfeld, LETTER Stiftung, Köln 2007, ISBN 3-930633-13-2.
- Erwin Dickhoff: Essener Köpfe – Wer war was?, Verlag Richard Bracht, Essen 1985, ISBN 3-87034-037-1.
- Peter H. Feist (Ed.): Will Lammert, Verlag der Kunst, Dresden 1963.
- Peter Heinz Feist: Plastik der DDR, Dresden 1965.
- Matthias Flügge: Will Lammert - Zeichnungen 1932, Stiftung Archiv der Akademie der Künste, Verlag der Kunst, Dresden 2002, ISBN 3-364-00393-9.
- John Heartfield (Ed.): Will Lammert - Gedächtnisausstellung, Akademie der Künste, Berlin 1959.
- Marlies Lammert: Will Lammert - Plastik und Zeichnungen (1910–1933), Akademie der Künste, Berlin/Gera/Weimar 1982.
- Marlies Lammert: Will Lammert - Ravensbrück, Akademie der Künste, Berlin 1968.
- Horst-Jörg Ludwig (Ed.) mit Vorwort von Werner Stötzer: Will Lammert (1892–1957) - Plastik und Zeichnungen. Ausstellung anlässlich des 100. Geburtstages des Künstlers, Akademie der Künste, Berlin 1992.
- Werner Röder, Herbert A. Strauss (Ed.): Will Lammert In: International Biographical Dictionary of Central European Emigrés 1933–1945, Saur Verlag, München u.a. 1980, ISBN 3-598-10087-6, Band 1.
- Günter Vogler: Das Thomas-Müntzer-Denkmal in Mühlhausen. Die Denkmaltradition und das Monument von Will Lammert, Mühlhausen 2007, ISBN 3-935547-21-8.
