= Lehmbruck =

Lehmbruck may refer to:

- Lehmbruck Museum, a museum in Duisburg, Germany
- 6504 Lehmbruck, a main-belt asteroid

== People with the surname ==
- Wilhelm Lehmbruck (1881–1919), German sculptor
