= Ludwig Kasper =

Austrian sculptor (1893–1945)

Ludwig Kasper (2 May 1893 – 28 August 1945) was an Austrian sculptor.

== Biography ==
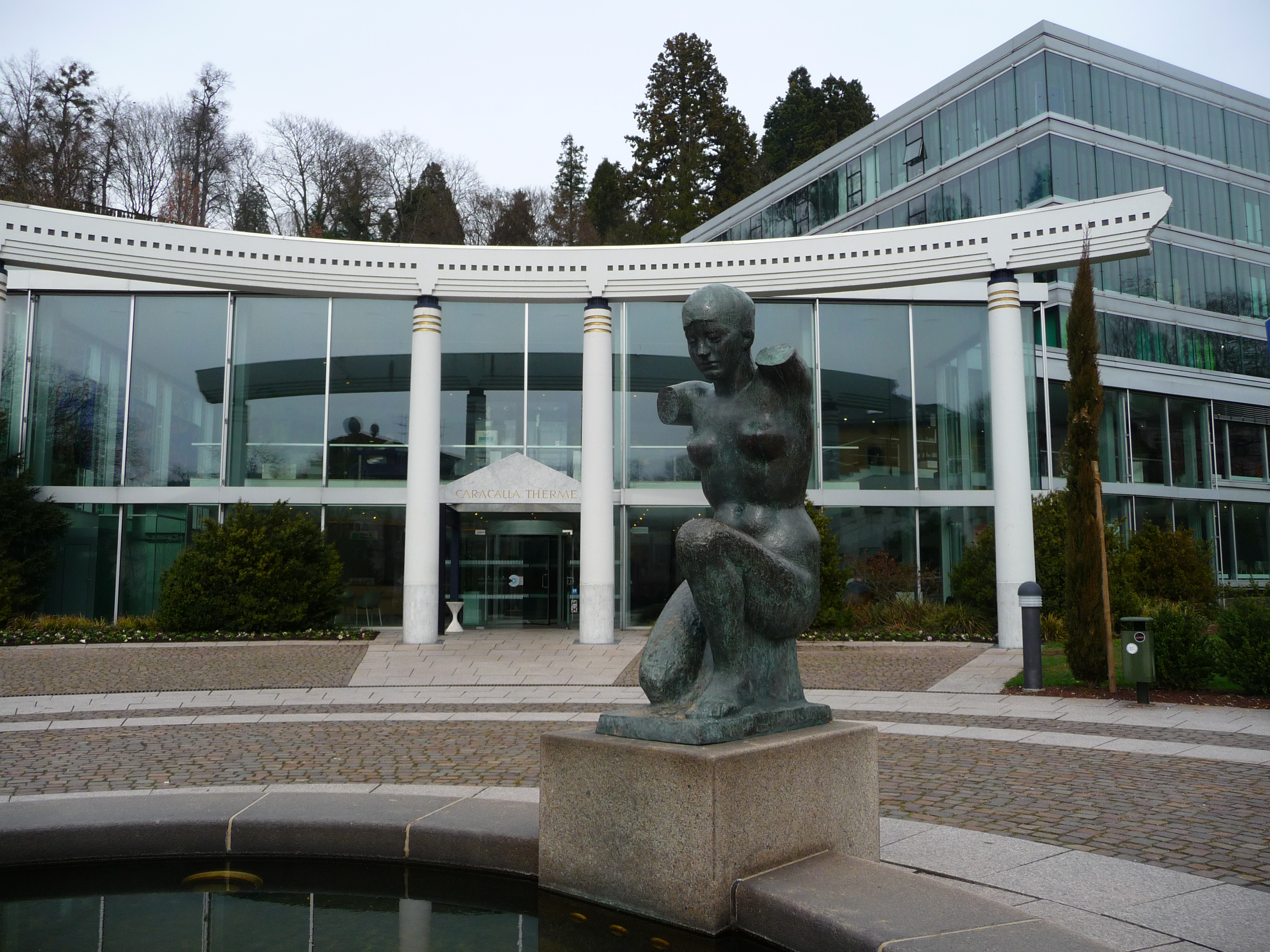
Kneeling Woman (1944)

Born in Gurten, Austria, on 2 May 1893, Ludwig Kasper was the son of a farmer. He received artistic training as a sculptor in Hallstatt, Tyrol, as well as from the landscapist Toni von Stadler. He studied with Hermann Hahn in Munich, then in Paris (1928–29), and later in Greece (1936), with a scholarship, and in Italy, after winning the Rome Prize of the Prussian Academy of Arts in 1939.

Kasper worked in Berna, Silesia (1930–33), and in Berlin (from 1933). This last period of creation was the most fertile for him.

His wife Ottilie (née Wolf; born 1906) was an artist; they married in 1930. The couple formed part of the Klosterstrasse artists' group from 1933, which also included Hermann Blumenthal, Werner Gilles, Werner Heldt, Käthe Kollwitz, Hermann Teuber and Herbert Tucholski. Artists influenced by Kasper include Blumenthal and Gerhard Marcks.

Between 1943 and 1944 or 1945, he taught sculpture at the School of Art of Braunschweig. The bombardment of that city led him to return to Austria. He died on 28 August 1945 in Braunau from kidney disease.

== Works ==
Kasper's sculptures are Neo-Classicist in style, influenced by Adolf Hildebrand; they predominantly depict the human form, including standing, seated and walking figures. Ursel Berger comments in his Grove Art Online biography that the "severe poses" make the figures appear "spellbound". Kasper worked in various materials including bronze, plaster, terracotta and marble. Significant works include Standing Girl (1931), Caryatid (1936), and Kore I and II (1937).

A retrospective was held in Munich City Gallery in 1952. His works were exhibited during Documenta 1 in 1955, the first in the series of Documenta exhibitions in Kassel. Some of his works are held at the Oberösterreichisches Landesmuseum, Linz.
