= Joseph Enseling =

German sculptor and academic

Joseph Bernhard Hubert Enseling (28 November 1886 – 16 July 1957) was a German sculptor and university professor. Educated in Düsseldorf and Paris, he lectured at the Düsseldorf Art Academy and taught the artists Joseph Beuys and Hermann Blumenthal. His own work encompassed industrial and mining monuments as well as architectural sculptures. He also created portraits of personalities from the 1920s and 1930s.

== Life and work ==
After training as a sculptor, Enseling studied from 1905 to 1910 with the sculptor Rudolf Bosselt, the painter and designer Peter Behrens and the architect Wilhelm Kreis at the Kunstakademie Düsseldorf and from 1910 to 1912 at the Académie Colarossi in Paris with Aristide Maillol. From 1922, he taught at what would later become the Folkwang School in Essen and from 1938 to 1952 he was professor at the Düsseldorf Art Academy. Among his students were Joseph Beuys and Hermann Blumenthal.

Enseling's work, which was often commissioned, consists of industrial and mining monuments as well as architectural sculptures, which were often created in collaboration with locally and regionally known architects such as Edmund Körner or Georg Metzendorf. In Essen, Enseling produced the putti (1910) on the Moltkebrücke and two allegorical giants (1911) in the immediate vicinity at the main entrance of the building trade school (today's Robert Schmidt vocational college) in the Moltkeviertel and the treasure trove fountain (1911/1912) on the Market place of the Margarethenhöhe. He also created portraits of personalities from the 1920s and 1930s and various memorials. One of them was the memorial erected on the market square in Essen-Frintrop in 1927 to commemorate those who died in the first World War, which was destroyed in a bomb attack on December 31, 1944.

== Literature ==
- Enseling, Josef . In: Hans Vollmer (Hrsg.): General Lexicon of Fine Artists of the XX. Century. tape 2 : E-J . EA Seemann, Leipzig 1955, p. 42-43 .
- Enseling, Joseph . In: Hans Vollmer (Hrsg.): General Lexicon of Fine Artists of the XX. Century. tape 5 : V-Z. Supplements: A-G . EA Seemann, Leipzig 1961, p. 461 .
- Enseling, Joseph . In: General Artist Lexicon . The visual artists of all times and peoples (AKL). Volume 34, Saur, Munich a. a. 2002, ISBN 3-598-22774-4 , p. 163.
- Walter Habel (Ed.): Who is who? The German who's who. arani, Berlin 1955, p. 245.
