= Milly Steger =

German sculptor

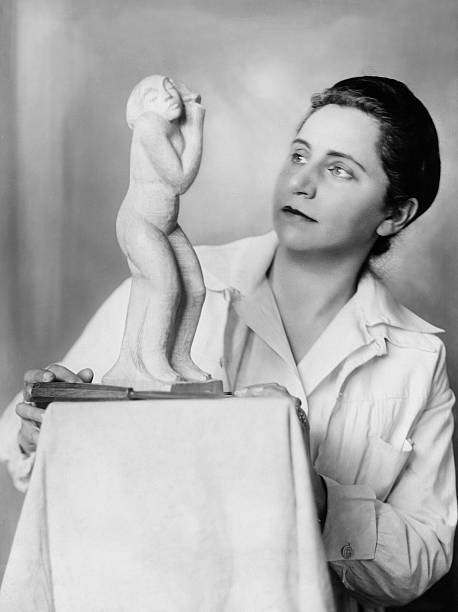
- Milly Steger, 1922
- Born: Emilie Sibilla Elisabeth Johanna Steger; 15 June 1881; Rheinberg, German Empire
- Died: 31 October 1948 (aged 67); Berlin

Milly Steger (15 June 1881 in Rheinberg as Emilie Sibilla Elisabeth Johanna Steger – 31 October 1948 in Berlin) was a German sculptor.

== Biography ==
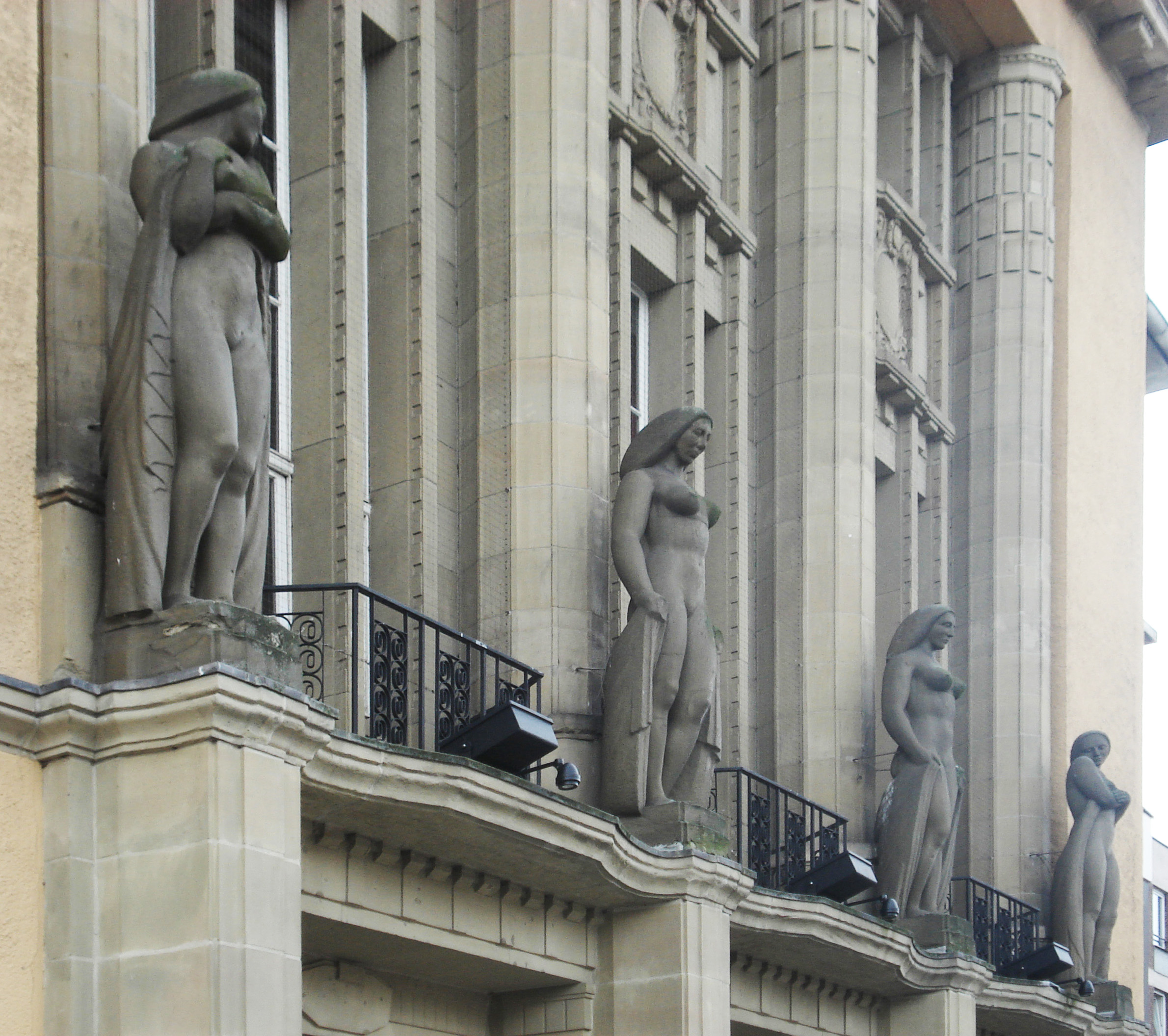

Milly Steger, born in Rheinberg as Emilie Sibilla Elisabeth Johanna Steger, spent her childhood in Elberfeld where her father was appointed as magistrate. After completing her general education, she received language and propriety education in a boarding school in London. While there, she took instruction in painting and decided to become an artist. In Elberfeld, she then attended a class for plasterers and stonemasons at the local arts and crafts school.

From 1903 to 1906, she received private training from Karl Janssen in Düsseldorf, as women were not allowed to attend the arts academy. She moved to Berlin in 1908, where she began teaching at the Women's Academy at the Society of Berlin Artists.

Steger was invited by the art patron Karl Ernst Osthaus to Hagen in 1910, where she was commissioned to create the first large-scale architectural sculpture for the city, creating four statues of women for the facade of the Hagen Theater. She was involved in the artist circle around Osthaus and made contacts with the sculptors Moissey Kogan and Will Lammert, the painter Christian Rohlfs, and the glass painter Jan Thorn-Prikker. Steger lived in a house in the artists' colony "Am Stirnband" in Hohenhagen.

For the tenth anniversary of the Folkwang Museum in Hagen in 1912, Milly Steger donated a sandstone women's head above the museum portal. In the following three years she designed reliefs for the Stadthalle Hagen. Supported by Osthaus, she participated in exhibitions of the Sonderbund (1910 in Düsseldorf and 1912 in Cologne) and at the German Werkbund Exhibition in Cologne in 1914.

Her financial situation deteriorated during World War I such that she could no longer afford the rent for her studio in Hagen. In 1917 she returned to Berlin, where she remained until the end of her life.

Steger spent much of the rest of her life teaching drawing and sculpture. Her work was also part of the sculpture event in the art competition at the 1936 Summer Olympics. Notable avant-garde patron Katherine Dreier collected her work, but much of Steger's unsold work was lost when her studio was destroyed during World War II. Just before her death in 1948, Steger was named the honorary president of the Democratic Women's League of Germany.
