= Lehmbruck Museum =

Art museum in Duisburg, Germany

Stiftung Wilhelm Lehmbruck Museum
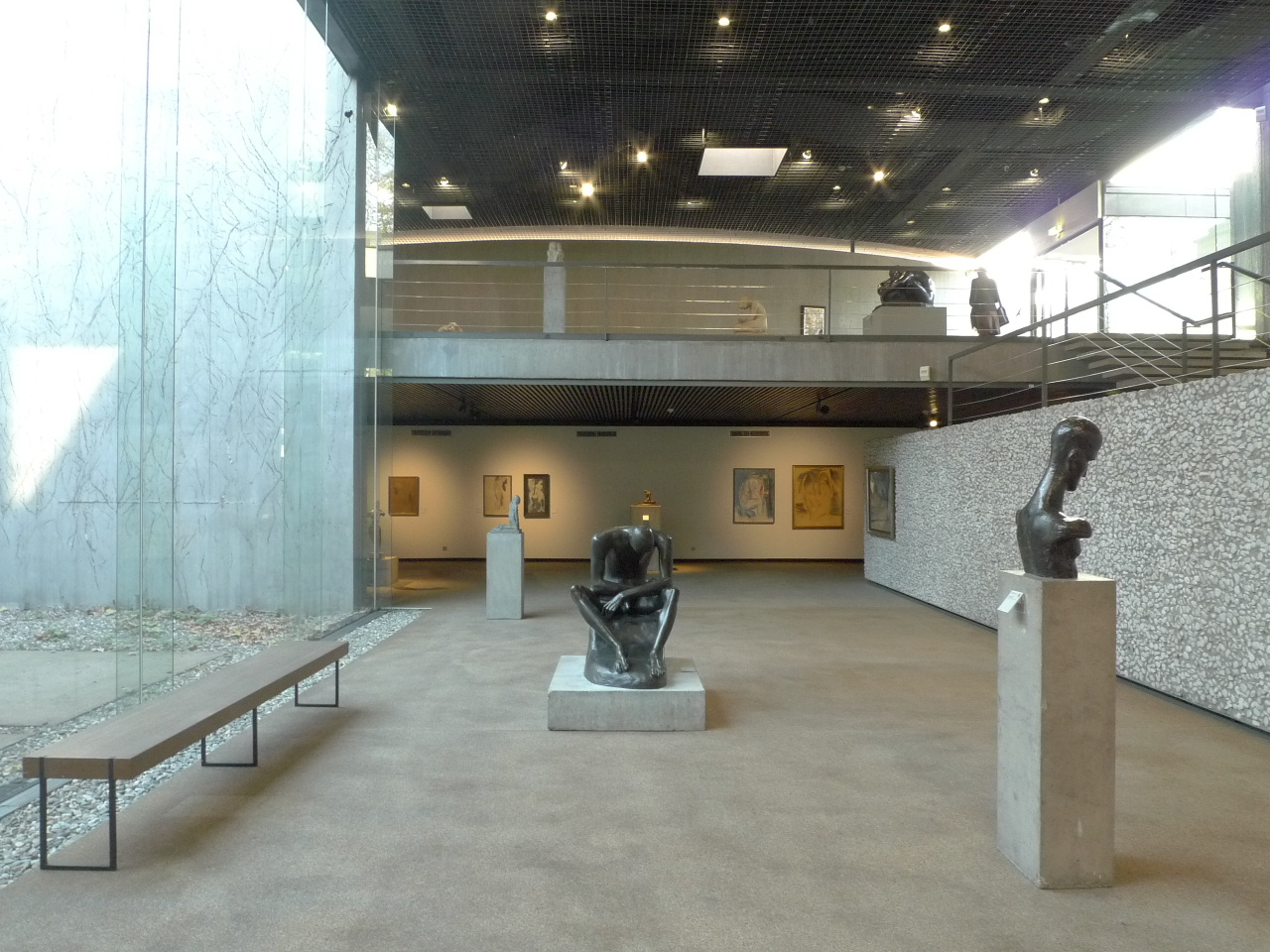
- A room at the Lehmbruck Museum
- Interactive fullscreen map
- Location: Duisburg, Germany
- Coordinates: 51.43028°N 6.76611°E

Lehmbruck Museum, Duisburg, North Rhine-Westphalia

The Stiftung Wilhelm Lehmbruck Museum - Center for International Sculpture is a museum in Duisburg, Germany, designed and built between 1957 and 1967.

Sculptures by Wilhelm Lehmbruck, after whom the museum is named, make up a large part of its collection. However, the museum has a substantial number of works by other 20th-century sculptors, including Ernst Barlach, Käthe Kollwitz, Ludwig Kasper, Hermann Blumenthal, Alexander Archipenko, Raymond Duchamp-Villon, Henri Laurens, Jacques Lipchitz, Alexander Rodtschenko, Laszlo Péri, Naum Gabo, Antoine Pevsner, Pablo Picasso, Salvador Dalí and Max Ernst. This is complemented by a considerable number of paintings by 19th- and 20th-century German artists. The museum circulates its substantial collection by re-installing works on an annual basis.

== Selected collection highlights ==
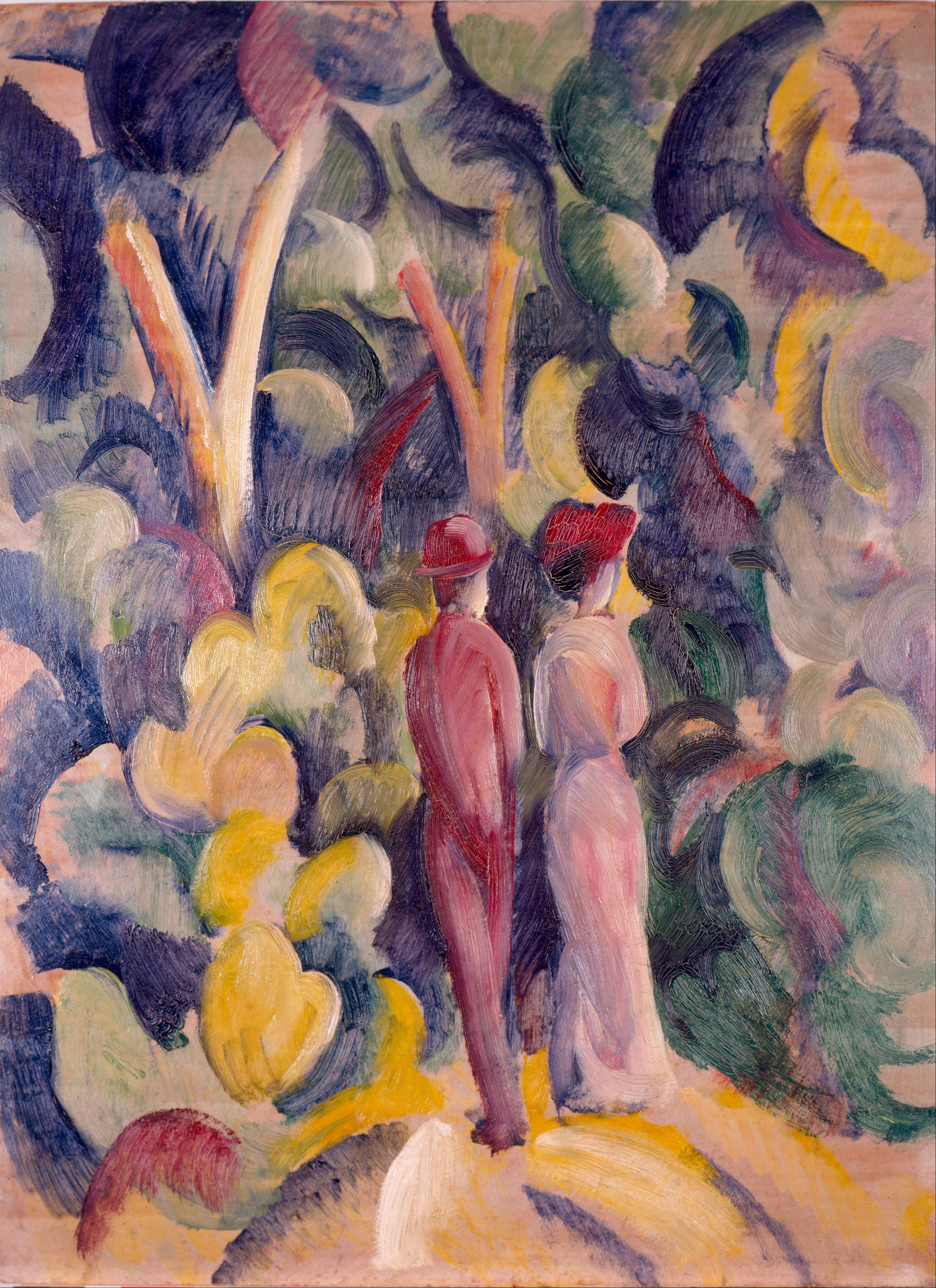
August Macke

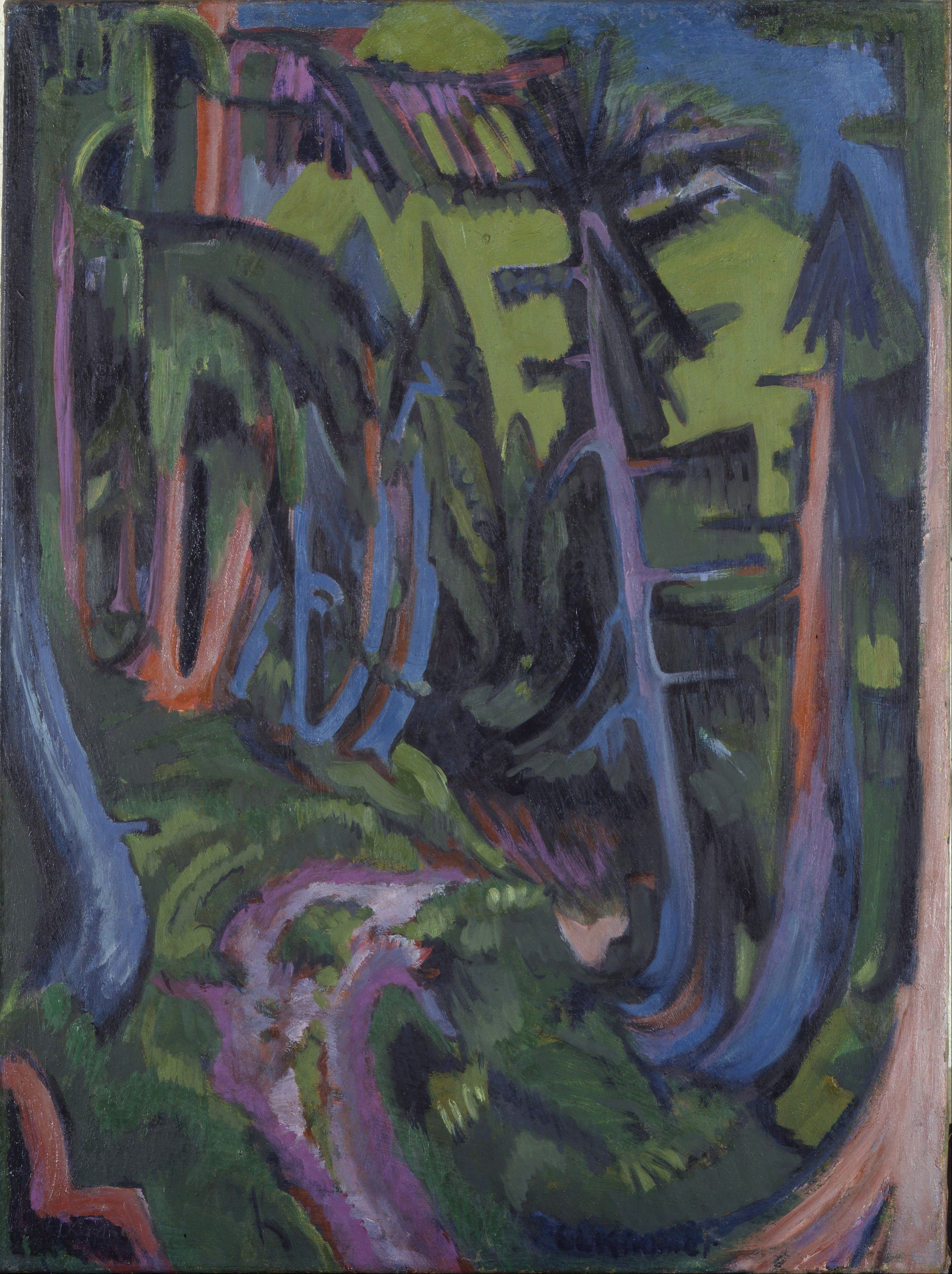
Ernst Ludwig Kirchner
