= Ernst Wilhelm Nay =

German painter

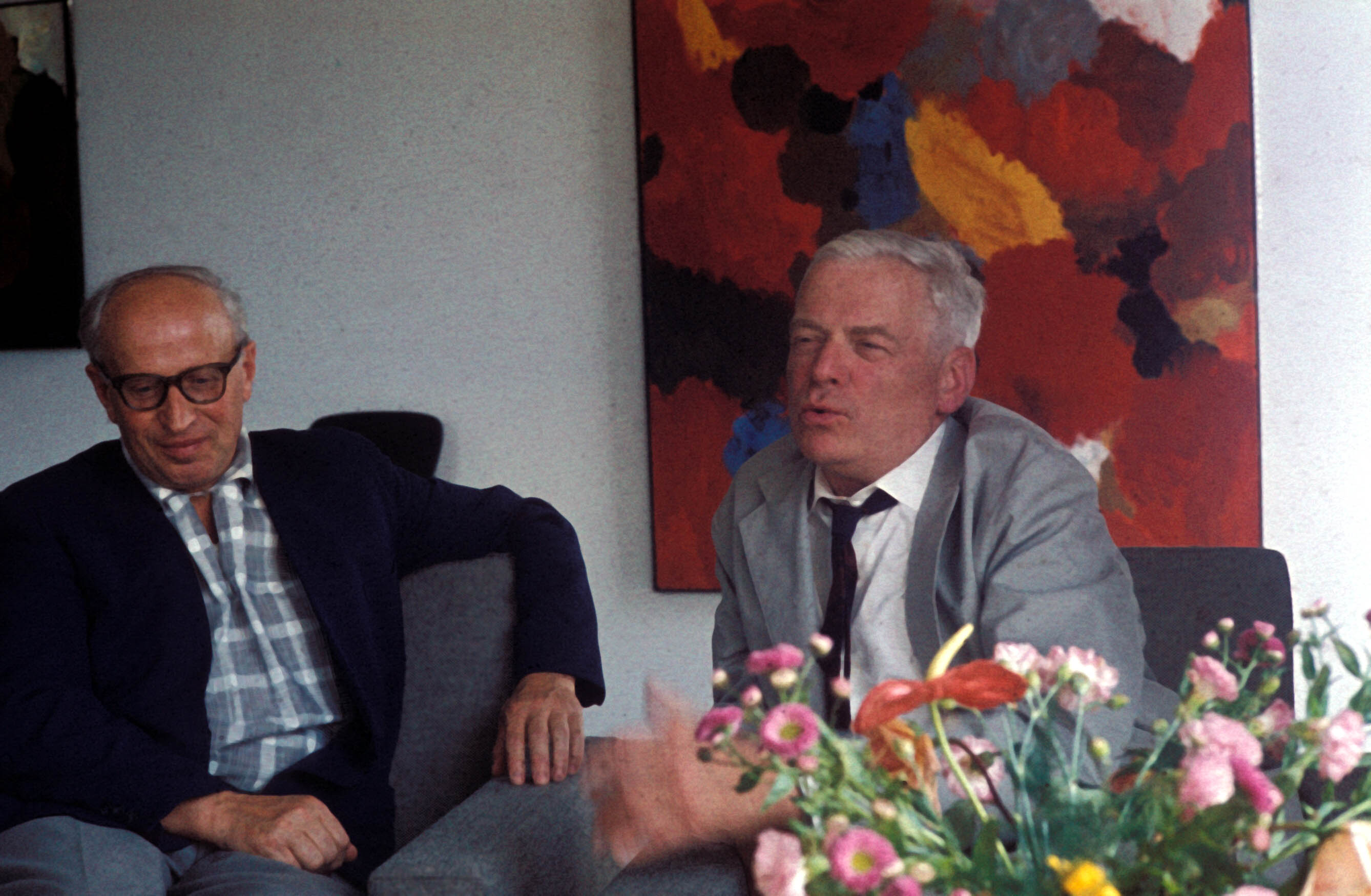
Ernst Wilhelm Nay (right).

Ernst Wilhelm Nay (June 11, 1902 – April 8, 1968) was a German painter and graphic designer of classical modernism. He is considered one of the most important painters of German post-war art.

== Biography ==
Nay came from a Berlin civil servant's family. He was born the second son of six children. His father Johannes Nay fell in 1914 as a captain in Belgium. Nay completed his humanistic education with the Abitur at the provincial school Pforta in Thuringia in 1921. During this time he made his first painting attempts. He began a bookshop apprenticeship in the Berlin bookstore Gsellius, which he broke off after a year. After that, he supported himself with odd jobs and began to paint self-portraits and landscapes. With three of his autodidactically painted pictures, he presented himself in 1924 to Karl Hofer at the College of Fine Arts in Berlin. Hofer recognized Nay's talent, gave him a scholarship and included him in his painting class. At the college Nay met his future wife Helene (Elly) Kirchner who worked there as a model. He finished his studies in 1928.

After a first study trip to Paris, the art historian Georg Carl Heise gave him in 1930 a scholarship for a stay on Bornholm, where he created the so-called "beach pictures". A year later, he received the Villa Massimo Fellowship in Rome from the Prussian Academy of Arts, where small-format, surrealist-abstract images were taken. In 1932, Nay married Elly Kirchner. The following year he participated in the exhibition "Living German Art" in the galleries Alfred Flechtheim and Paul Cassirer. In a critical article of the National Socialists in the "Volkischer Beobachter" of February 25, 1933, his picture "Liebespaar" was mocked in 1930 as a "masterpiece of vulgarity". During summer stays 1935–1936 at the Baltic Sea in Vietzkerstrand (Pomerania) emerged during a first major phase of the "Thin and Fischer pictures", 1934–1936, also large-scale pen and ink drawings, the so-called "fisherman's drawings". In 1937, two of his paintings were shown in the exhibition "Degenerate Art". Through Heise's mediation, Nay received financial support from Edvard Munch, which enabled him to travel to the Norwegian Lofoten Islands, where he painted large-format watercolors. The so-called "Lofoten-Bilder" (1937–1938) was created in the Berlin studio according to the motifs of these watercolors.

In 1940, he forced himself (especially for financial reasons) to military service. First, he arrived as an infantryman to southern France, then to Brittany and in 1942 he was transferred as a card maker to Le Mans. There he met the amateur sculptor Pierre de Térouanne, who provided him his studio and even provided painting material. During these years, several smaller oil paintings and numerous works on paper were created. In 1944, Hans Lühdorf wrote a diary-like account of Nay's artistic work in Le Mans. Already in May 1945 Nay was released by the Americans. Because his Berlin apartment, which at the same time served as his studio, had been destroyed by a bomb attack in 1943, he moved to Hofheim / Ts. And was able to move into a small studio house through the intermediary of collector and art dealer Hanna Bekker vom Rath.

After the war Nay created from 1945 to 1949 the so-called "Hekatebilder", which followed from 1949–1951 the "Fugal pictures". As early as 1946 he met Elisabeth Kerschbaumer, the assistant to his gallery owner Günther Franke in Munich, and whom he married after a mutual divorce by Elly Nay in 1949. In 1950 a first retrospective of the artist took place in the Kestner-Gesellschaft in Hanover. A year later, he moved to Cologne, which remained his center of life until his death. In 1953 he drew an abstract film ("A melody, four painters", directed by Herbert Seggelke) together with Jean Cocteau, Gino Severini and Hans Erni. In the most well-known pictures of the artist, the so-called "Scheibenbildern" (1954-1962), the circular form of the disc became the dominant motif in all its modifications. The most prominent example of this is the 1956 mural "Freiburger Bild" (2.55 x 6.55 m) for the Chemical Institute of the Albert-Ludwigs-Universität Freiburg.

In 1955, Nay published his manifesto "From the Gestalt value of color". In this time his work found international resonance. His first solo exhibition in the USA was shown in 1955, followed one year later by a solo exhibition in the German pavilion at the Venice Biennale). He participated in documenta I (1955), II (1959) and III (1964). In 1960, the German art historian Werner Haftmann published the first Nay monograph. Between 1963-1964 Nay worked on the so-called "eye pictures". At the suggestion of Arnold Bode Nay painted in 1964 three large, 4 x 4 m measuring "documenta images", which were presented at the documenta III in Kassel on the ceiling (the "documenta images" are now on permanent loan to the Federal Chancellery in Berlin). From 1965, the "late pictures" were created, on which Nay worked until the end of his life. In 1968, Nay completed the designs for the "ceramic mural" in the Nuclear Research Center Karlsruhe, which, however, was only posthumously realized. At the beginning of April, the last painting "White-Black-Yellow" (WV 1303) was created. Shortly thereafter Nay died in his Cologne house of heart failure. He was buried at the Cologne Melaten cemetery.

== Work ==
The following explanations are based on the introductory texts on the various phases of Elisabeth Nay-Scheibler's work in the catalogue raisonné of oil paintings.

=== Early pictures (1922–1933) ===
The early pictures of Nay show autodidactically painted landscapes and portraits of his immediate surroundings, in which influences of Henri Matisse and his teacher Karl Hofer are recognizable. A special place takes the painting "portrait Franz Reuter" (WV 6) from 1925, "the image in which Nay was aware of being a painter." His attachment to abstraction is already evident in the details of the paintings, and during his nine-month stay in Rome in 1931/32, Nay has hardly any eyes for the "classical" art of this city, but begins to work on oddly surreal, small-format still life with larvae, shells or worms to work ("Large shell with men", 1932, WV 110, "fleeing worms", 1932, WV 128). In his "Regests to life and work" he remembered this time: "[...] 1931/32 I was at the German Academy in Rome, annoying because I was crammed into school with the relics of humanistic education (... I painted surreal formal pictures, but certainly my own and throughout the course of my art quite einzubauende images."

=== Dünen- and Fischer pictures (1934–1936) ===
With his mythical animal pictures, which originated around 1934 and the "dune and Fischer pictures" ("White Bull", 1934, WV 148, "Mandrill", 1934, WV 153), Nay developed a new way of image design. Animal shapes delineated by black lines are often accompanied by simple symbol shapes, such as the circle as sun and moon signs. Inspired by summer stays on the Baltic Sea, where he led a simple life with the fishermen, Nay recognized in the constant ups and downs of the swell an original form of dynamics ("dunes", 1935, WV 175). Even in prehistoric times, the wave or serpentine line with its alternating up and down bows as a sign of the eternal movement of death and rebirth. Nay transmitted this formal structure of the movement to dune and nocturnal sea pictures ("Nocturnal Sea", 1935, WV 182). In numerous large-format pen and ink drawings, which translate the entrances and exits of the boats and the activity of the fishermen into free line art, Nay prepared his so-called "dune and fisherman pictures", which also show a strong dynamic in the movement of the swells, but is also expressed in the contrasting verticals of the boat masts and sails ("Ostseefischer I", 1935, WV 189) .The figures of the fishermen are highly abstracted, their spherical or triangular heads showing only a single punctiform eye in the middle.

=== Lofoten-Bilder (1937–1938) and pictures from 1939 ===
With the beginning of National Socialist rule, Nay's life situation deteriorated considerably. His images were defamed as "degenerate" and he was banned from exhibiting, and he was no longer allowed to buy work materials (canvases, colors, etc.) The material worries of those years were compounded by the mental strain that resulted from the lack of contact. CG Heise helped this distressing situation by giving Nay two stays in Norwegian Lofoten, which had great significance for Nay's artistic development: "The bizarre formations of the mountains and fjords, the crystal clear light, the shadowless shining colors of the far north and the primeval The world of fishermen and whalers never failed to take effect on Nay, where he found himself confronting a nature that largely corresponded to his own, and with this experience, his complex of color broke completely [...]. " Compared to the previous works of the "Lofoten-Bilder" changed colourfulness Nay choose t expressive colors and uses z. For example, instead of clouds, strongly colored spots in the skies of the landscapes, which in combination with the other colors of the picture cancel out the spatial background effect of the sky ("Lofotenlandschaft", 1937, WV 218; "People in the Lofoten", 1938, WV 226). The almost always occurring people are dissolved into rhythmic-dynamic abstractions ("People in the Lofoten", 1938, WV 240). As abstracted figures, they become expressive color signatures, whereby landscape and figure appear as equal elements of chromatic image formation.

=== France pictures (1940–1944) ===
Most of the works from the France period show thematically legendary scenes in which abstracted figures seem to be involved in a superpersonal, tragic or euphoric event. Even the titles, such as "Eduard's Death I-IV" (1943, WV 311-314) or "The Angel" (1944, WV 323), reflect the simultaneity of near-death and fullness of life. The peculiarly shaped head shapes and the eyes marked as closed by a stroke are reminiscent of skulls ("Liegende", 1943, WV 316). In contrast, the harmonious-warm color scheme of these images, in which Nay now for the first time selects yellow as the dominant color and often combined with bright red, thereby achieving a bright, vivid color sound. In order to bridge the seemingly perspicuous interstices of his intensively colored and dense pictorial compositions, he invented a motif of alternating repetitive checkerboard patterns, a design element that he would always use later. Nay wrote in his "Regesten": "Those images from the war were actually something unique in my art. They were born of personal experiences that I clung to because I could not understand everything else, a constellation that otherwise never existed in my art."

=== Hecate paintings (1945–1948) ===
From 1945, in Hofheim am Taunus, the numerous works of the so-called "Hecate Period" were created. These works mark a new stage of development in the field of tension between figurative motifs that are still recognizable and their almost entirely abstract design in Nay's work, which reflects both the tragedy of the recent past and the burgeoning hopes of those first years after the war, the term "Hecate imagery" coined Ernst Gosebruch (1872-1953) with reference to Nay's "Daughter of Hecate" I (1945, WV 337), of which Nay also made a second, smaller version (1946, WV 366)." Significantly, there is a daughter of the Hecate - a sorceress from the pre-Greek cults, moon goddess and goddess of death - in Greek Mythology is not This is an alienation or invention of Nay, as well as the titles in general from this work period, in which often ancient or bibl It is also striking that Nay's style of painting has changed at the same time: painting becomes impasto, and Nay now chooses one of many images much darker palette. In retrospect, Nay himself writes about these works: "Once again very strong formal ideas came to light that combined with mythical-magical ones. Paintings, painted thick, the year after year, the older they get - all the better. Where I meet them, I am delighted. But I am a person of the present whom the present also determines in his life."

=== Rhythmic pictures (1952–1953) ===
At the end of 1951, Nay moved to Cologne, still marked by war damage, and moved into a loft in Wiethasestraße in Cologne-Braunsfeld. Nay reacts to this change from a rural domicile to the urban, lively departure situation of the Rhenish metropolis with a new, completely non-objective image design. Even under the influence of musical excitement (Cologne was then already known for its important concerts of New Music), images now emerge in which the clear contours of the fugals dissolve images in a violently moving rhythm, resulting in finer, more spontaneous and gestural color forms expresses the mostly black line structures are accompanied. The musicality of these images is reflected in their titles: "Vocal sound" (1952, WV 604), "Silver melody" (1952, WV 600) or "Black rhythms, red to gray" (1952, WV 629). Looking back on this period, Nay wrote in 1962: "I was particularly interested in the absolute tone and the often extended negative forms of Webern's music. That was around 1950. Later, the compositions of serial and punctual music were added. Next to Dallapiccola and Nono, Boulez impresses me the most. This one because of his extensive work in electronic music, whose technique I met here in Cologne."

=== Scheibenbilder (1954–1962) ===
In his most well-known, longest and critically most successful period to date, Nay makes the round shape of the disc – in all its variations – the main motif of his painting, which he now increasingly reflects theoretically. In 1955 he publishes his book "On the Design Value of Color", in which he outlines the fundamentals of his "first system" of color "punctuation." As Nay discovered the "disc" as a central design element, he himself describes it this way: "That's how it started I started with very innocuous new experiments and found out: If I go with a brush on the canvas, there is a small blob, I enlarge that, then I have a disc.This disc is of course already doing a lot on the surface If I add other slices, then a system of at least colored and quantitative proportions is created, which can now be combined and further assembled into larger image complexes. " After Nay had combined the slices initially with graphic elements, they became the sole in 1955 Picture motif and from today's point of view "classical" works of this period emerge.From 1957/58 Nay changes the outer Ers His discourses are shaped more openly and softer in their outlines ("Rondo", 1958, WV 871), then developed more out of the circular movement of the brush ("Chorisch Grau", 1960, WV 971) and finally with Partially violent gestures "to strike through" begins ("Ecstatic Blue", WV 990, 1961). Behind this was that Nay felt that he had to "open" or "overcome" his hitherto stringently enforced system of selective placement of color at some point, so as not to get stuck in a "modern academy of painting".

=== Augenbilder (1963–1964) ===
The spontaneous crossing of the discs leads Nay around 1962/63 to the discovery of the ocular motif, which as a further development of the "disc" for two years, the image of the so-called "eye images" determines ("eyes", 1964, WV 1092 In the light of the artist's intention to "open", it is characteristic that with this motif of the "eye", for the first time in years, something reminiscent of the human being is visible again (Magda, p. 26). This primeval theme of seeing and being looked at together, promising magical powers and spellbinding defenses in archetypal symbols, but also symbolizing light and spiritual awareness, is a daunting challenge to Nay's completely non-objective image design. But he does not renounce the association of the magical aura of this figurative form, but brings the effect of the large-scale eye-forms of his images into balance with a very moving, abstract formal language, which he incorporates into a passionately unfolding chromaticism. All registers of a strongly contrasting colourfulness, as well as the emphasis on delicate-light and dark-colored contrasts, brings Nay into this dialogue and thus increases the vitality and freedom of his image design. But despite the newly won and spiritedly used painterly freedom, the details and the overall conception of these paintings have a controlled order. In public, the new and so unusually expressive images Nay were perceived ambivalent. The three "documenta images" of 1964 (WV 1121, 1122 and WV 1123) were discussed in the so-called "documenta dispute" extremely controversial and led to some violent polemics against Nay.

=== Late pictures (1965–1968) ===
From 1965, Nay made one final turn in his work: he abandoned the "monostructure" of the "disc shape" as a dominating design element and developed his "second system" of colored "sequence", for which not only one changed style of painting (the paint becomes fluid and even), but above all a re-expanded and formally very clear repertoire of forms is characteristic. For example, precisely defined spindle shapes ("Spindle - Red", 1967, WV 1260), chains of round or oval discs ("Red Chain", 1965, WV 1180) and bow shapes ("With dark gray arch form", 1966, WV 1208) and Ribbons, often associated with organic remembering associations. In the last pictures even "figurative", partly even reminiscent of the form of human formations emerge, with which in these pictures, according to Nay, a beyond the traditional opposition "abstract against real", lying, "hitherto unknown human representation" or a "new visual picture of man" beyond the opposition "abstract" or "real", Nay finds with these works to a new, almost third and by himself as "elementary" designated image form, in which the always central theme of his art – the human being – returns to the picture in a completely new way. In 1967, in his last essay "My Color", which he himself published, he writes: "It is worth living so far that the real color image can arise and the color sounds in such a way that without special intention of the artist human becomes visible, human and creaturely in new, unknown he formulation."

The written estate is since 1979 in the Archive of Fine Arts in the Germanic National Museum. In September 2005, the Ernst Wilhelm Nay Foundation, which manages and manages the artistic estate of Nay, was founded in Cologne.

== Exhibitions (selected) ==
1946: E. W. Nay, Gallery Gerd Rosen, Berlin

1950: E. W. Nay (Retrospektive), Kestner-Gesellschaft, Hannover

1955: Ernst Wilhelm Nay, Kleemann Galleries, New York

1956: Ernst Wilhelm Nay. Deutscher Pavillon, 28 Biennale die Venezia, Venedig

1959: E. W. Nay (Retrospektive), Kunstverein für Rheinlande und Westfalen, Düsseldorf

1964: I. Internationale der Zeichnung. Sonderausstellung Ernst Wilhelm Nay, Mathildenhöhe Darmstadt, Darmstadt

1964/1965: Ernst Wilhelm Nay. Gemälde 1955–1964, Kunstverein in Hamburg, Hamburg/ Badischer Kunstverein, Karlsruhe/ Frankfurter Kunstverein Steinernes Haus, Frankfurt a. Main

1969: E. W. Nay (Retrospektive), Wallraf-Richartz-Museum, Köln/ Nationalgalerie, Berlin/ Städelsches Kunstinstitut, Frankfurt a. Main/ Kunstverein in Hamburg, Hamburg

1970: E. W. Nay. Bilder aus den Jahren 1935–1968 (Retrospektive), Museum Städtische Kunstsammlungen, Bonn

1976: Nay. Un Maestro del Color. Obras die 1950 a 1968, Museo de Arte Moderne, Instituto Nacional de Bellas Artes, Mexiko-Stadt

1980: E. W. Nay. Bilder und Dokumente (Retrospektive), Germanisches Nationalmuseum Nürnberg/ Haus der Kunst, München/ Bayer-AG Erholungshaus, Leverkusen/ Wilhelm-Hack-Museum, Ludwigshafen a. Rhein/ Neue Galerie, Kassel

1985: Bilder kommen aus Bildern. E. W. Nay 1902–1968. Gemälde und unveröffentlichte Schriften aus vier Jahrzenten, Museum Haus Lange, Krefeld/ Westfälischer Kunstverein, Münster/ Kunstverein in Hamburg, Hamburg

1990/1991: Ernst Wilhelm Nay. Retrospektive, Museum Ludwig in der Josef-Haubrich-Kunsthalle, Köln/ Kunsthalle Basel, Basel/ Scottish National Gallery of Modern Art, Edinburgh

1998: Ernst Wilhelm Nay, Stedelijk Museum, Amsterdam/ Gemäldegalerie Neue Meister, Dresden/ Wilhelm-Lehmbruck-Museum, Duisburg

2002/2003 E. W. Nay. Variationen. Retrospektive zum 100. Geburtstag, Kunsthalle der Hypo-Kulturstiftung, München/ Kunstmuseum Bonn, Bonn

2009: E. W. Nay. Bilder der 1960er Jahre, Schirn Kunsthalle, Frankfurt a. Main/ Haus am Waldsee, Berlin

2013/2014 Ernst Wilhelm Nay. Bilder, Michael Werner Kunsthandel, Köln

2016: NAY 1964, Aurel Scheibler, Berlin

2017/2018: Ernst Wilhelm Nay, Almine Rech Gallery, London

2018: Ernst Wilhelm Nay. 1948–1951, Jahn und Jahn, Munich

== Museums (selected) ==
- Kunstmuseum Basel, Basel, Switzerland
- Nationalgalerie Berlin, Berlin, Germany
- Indiana University Art Museum, Bloomington, IN, United States
- Royal Museums of Fine Arts of Belgium, Brussels, Belgium
- Tate Modern, London, England
- Albright-Knox Art Gallery, Buffalo, NY, United States
- Busch-Reisinger Museum, Cambridge, MA, United States
- The Detroit Institute of Arts, Detroit, MI, United States
- Staatliche Kunstsammlungen Dresden, Dresden, Germany
- Kunstsammlung Nordrhein-Westfalen, Düsseldorf, Germany
- Wilhelm Lehmbruck-Museum, Duisburg, Germany
- Folkwang Museum, Essen, Germany
- Städelsches Kunstinstitut, Frankfurt am Main, Germany
- Kunstmuseum Moritzburg Halle (Saale), Germany
- Kunsthalle Hamburg, Germany
- Sprengel Museum, Hannover, Germany
- Wadsworth Atheneum, Hartford, CT, United States
- Staatliche Kunsthalle Karlsruhe, Karlsruhe, Germany
- Neue Galerie Kassel, Kassel, Germany
- Museum Ludwig, Cologne, Germany
- Kaiser Wilhelm Museum, Krefeld, Germany
- Museum der bildenden Künste, Leipzig, Germany
- Landesmuseum Mainz, Mainz, Germany
- Städtische Kunsthalle Mannheim, Mannheim, Germany
- Milwaukee Art Museum, Milwaukee, WI, United States
- Bayerische Staatsgemäldesammlungen, München, Germany
- Westfälisches Landesmuseum, Münster, Germany
- The Solomon R. Guggenheim Museum, New York, NY, United States
- Germanisches Nationalmuseum, Nürnberg, Germany
- Landesmuseum Oldenburg, Germany
- Saarlandmuseum, Saarbrücken, Germany
- The Saint Louis Art Museum, Saint Louis, MO, United States
- Staatsgalerie Stuttgart, Stuttgart, Germany
- Museum Wiesbaden, Wiesbaden, Germany
- Museum Moderner Kunst Vienna, Vienna, Austria
- Portland Art Museum, Oregon, United States

== Literature (chronological) ==
- Werner Haftmann: Fritz Usinger: Ernst Wilhelm Nay. Recklinghausen 1961
- Karlheinz Gabler: Ernst Wilhelm Nay. Die Druckgraphik 1923–68. Stuttgart 1975
- Nay – Zeichnungen. Jahrhunderthalle Hoechst, Hoechst 1976 (Ausstellungskatalog)
- Archiv für Bildende Kunst am Germanischen Nationalmuseum Nürnberg (Hrsg.): E. W. Nay. Bilder und Dokumente. München 1980
- E. W. Nay – Zeichnungen. Städtisches Museum Leverkusen, Schloß Morsbroich, München 1981 (Ausstellungskatalog)
- Aurel Scheibler: Ernst Wilhelm Nay. Werkverzeichnis der Ölgemälde. 2 Bde., Köln 1990
- Ernst Wilhelm Nay – Lofotenbilder. Zu Ehren von Car Georg Heise (1890–1979). Overbeck-Gellschaft Lübeck, Lübeck 1990 (Ausstellungskatalog)
- E. W. Nay. Retrospektive. Josef-Haubrich-Kunsthalle/ Kunsthalle Basel/ Scottish National Gallery of Modern Art, Edinburgh, Köln 1991
- Siegfried Gohr: E. W. Nay. Postkartenbuch mit Einführung, Chronologie, Bilderläuterungen und Auswahlbibliographie, Dortmund 1992
- Ernst Wilhelm Nay. Die Hoffheimer Jahre 1945–1951. Städtische Galerie im Städel, Frankfurt a. M./ Museum der Bildende Künste Leipzig, Frankfurt a. M. 1994 (Ausstellungskatalog)
- Ralph Köhnen: Ernst Wilhelm Nay. Pythagoräer - "Radardenker". In: Künstler. Kritisches Lexikon zur Gegenwartskunst. Hrsg. von Lothar Romain, Detlef Bluemler. Ausgabe 48, Heft 30, 4. Quartal 1999, S. 1–16
- E. W. Nay. Aquarelle, Gouachen, Zeichnungen. Kunsthalle in Emden/ Saarland Museum Saarbrücken, Ostfildern-Ruit 2000 (Ausstellungskatalog)
- Magdalene Claesges (-Bette): Die Geburt des elementaren Bildes aus dem Geist der Abstraktion. Versuch einer Deutung der theoretischen Schriften von Ernst Wilhelm Nay. Köln 2001 (Dissertation)
- Ernst Wilhelm Nay. Die Druckgrafik. Kunstverein Göttingen/ Städtisches Kunstmuseum Spendhaus Reutlingen, Göttingen 2001 (Ausstellungskatalog)
- E. W. Nay. Lesebuch. Selbstzeugnisse und Schriften 1931–1968. Bearbeitet von Magdalene Claesges, Köln 2002
- Siegfried Gohr, Johann Georg Prinz von Hohenzollern, Dieter Ronte: Nay – Variationen. Retrospektive zum 100. Geburtstag. Kunsthalle der Hypo-Kulturstiftung, München/ Kunstmuseum Bonn, Köln 2002
- Friedrich Weltzien: Figur und Körperbild. Berlin 2003
- E. W. Nay. Aquarelle und Gouachen. Graphische Sammlung München/ Museum Folkwang Essen/ Musée d' Art Moderne et Contemporain, Strasbourg, Köln 2004 (Ausstellungskatalog)
- Dirk Schwarze, Die Kunst der Inszenierung oder Als Arnold Bode Ernst Wilhelm Nay in den Himmel hob. Schriftenreihe des documenta Archivs, Bd. 18, Berlin 2009
- Ingrid Pfeifer, Max Hollein (Hrsg.): E. W. Nay – Bilder der 1960er Jahre. Schirn Kunsthalle Frankfurt 2009 (Ausstellungskatalog)
- Ernst Wilhelm Nay Stiftung (Hrsg.): Ernst Wilhelm Nay. Das Polyphone Bild. Gouachen, Aquarelle, Zeichnungen. Kunstmuseum Bonn, Bonn 2012 (Ausstellungskatalog)
- Magdalene Claesges: Ernst Wilhelm Nay. Werkverzeichnis. Aquarelle, Gouachen, Zeichnungen. 2 Bde., Ostfildern-Ruit 2012–14
- Jean-Paul Stonard, Pamela Kort (Ed.): Ernst Wilhelm Nay. London 2012
- Ernst Wilhelm Nay. Michael Werner Kunsthandel Köln, Köln 2012 (Ausstellungskatalog)
- Franziska Müller, Ernst Wilhelm Nays Vom Gestaltwert der Farbe als Künstlertheorie und Zeitzeugnis. Baden-Baden 2016, ISBN 978-3-8288-3841-3
- Ernst Wilhelm Nay. Almine Rech Gallery, London 2018 (Ausstellungskatalog) ISBN 978-2-930573-25-0
