= Werner Heldt =

German painter (1904–1954)

Werner Heldt (17 November 1904 – 3 October 1954) was a German painter.

== Life ==
Heldt was born in Berlin on 17 November 1904. The son of a pastor, he attended a grammar school, the Gymnasium zum Grauen Kloster. He studied art at the School of Arts and Crafts in 1923–1924, and then at the Berlin Academy until 1930. His early work consisting, mostly of townscapes and scenes of night-life, shows the influence of his friend, the much older Heinrich Zille, with whom he used to visit the bars of suburban Berlin. By 1929, though, he had broken away from Zille's mildly satirical and rather antiquated vision of the city. In 1930 he visited Paris, where he met Maurice Utrillo, whose work he admired. Between 1929 and 1933 he underwent a course of psychoanalysis which prompted him to give up painting, instead making a series of drawings inspired by his dreams.

He moved to Mallorca in 1933, but following the outbreak of the Spanish Civil War he returned to Berlin where he shared a studio with the painter Werner Gilles and the sculptor Hermann Blumenthal. Unnerved by the political situation, Heldt produced little work during this period. He was conscripted into the military in 1940, and eventually took up painting again while a prisoner of war in Ostfriesland in 1945.

Following his release from captivity, Heldt returned to Berlin, where he painted the scenes of the devastated city which have won him his reputation.

In the autumn of 1954 he went to stay with Werner Gilles on Ischia. He died there on 3 October, at the age of 49.
