= Wilhelm Lehmbruck =

German sculptor

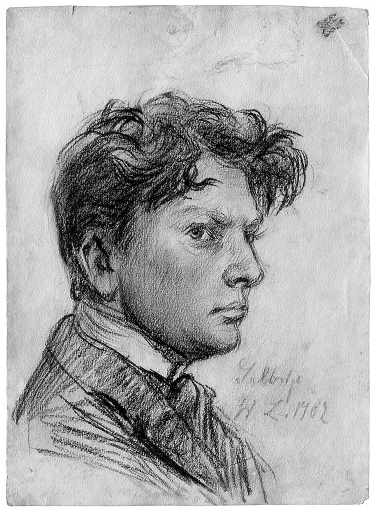
- Wilhelm Lehmbruck Self-portrait (1902)
- Born: Wilhelm Lehmbruck; 4 January 1881; Meiderich (part of Duisburg since 1905), German Empire
- Died: 25 March 1919 (aged 38); Berlin, Germany
- Known for: Sculpture
- Movement: Realism, Expressionism

Wilhelm Lehmbruck (4 January 1881 – 25 March 1919) was a German sculptor. One of the most important of his generation, he was influenced by realism and expressionism.

== Biography ==
Born in Meiderich (part of Duisburg from 1905), he was the fourth of eight children born to the miner Wilhelm Lehmbruck and his wife Margaretha Wüstmann. He was able to study sculpture arts at the School of Applied Arts in Düsseldorf by a stipend from the municipal authorities. In 1899 he began to make a living by doing illustrations for scientific publications. He trained at the Kunstakademie Düsseldorf and is associated with the Düsseldorf school of painting from 1901 to 1906. On leaving the academy Lehmbruck worked as an independent artist in Düsseldorf. He exhibited for the first time at the Deutsche Kunstausstellung, in Cologne in 1906. He was impressed by the sculptures of Auguste Rodin, and traveled to England, Italy, the Netherlands, and Paris. In 1907, he married Anita Kaufmann, and they had three sons.

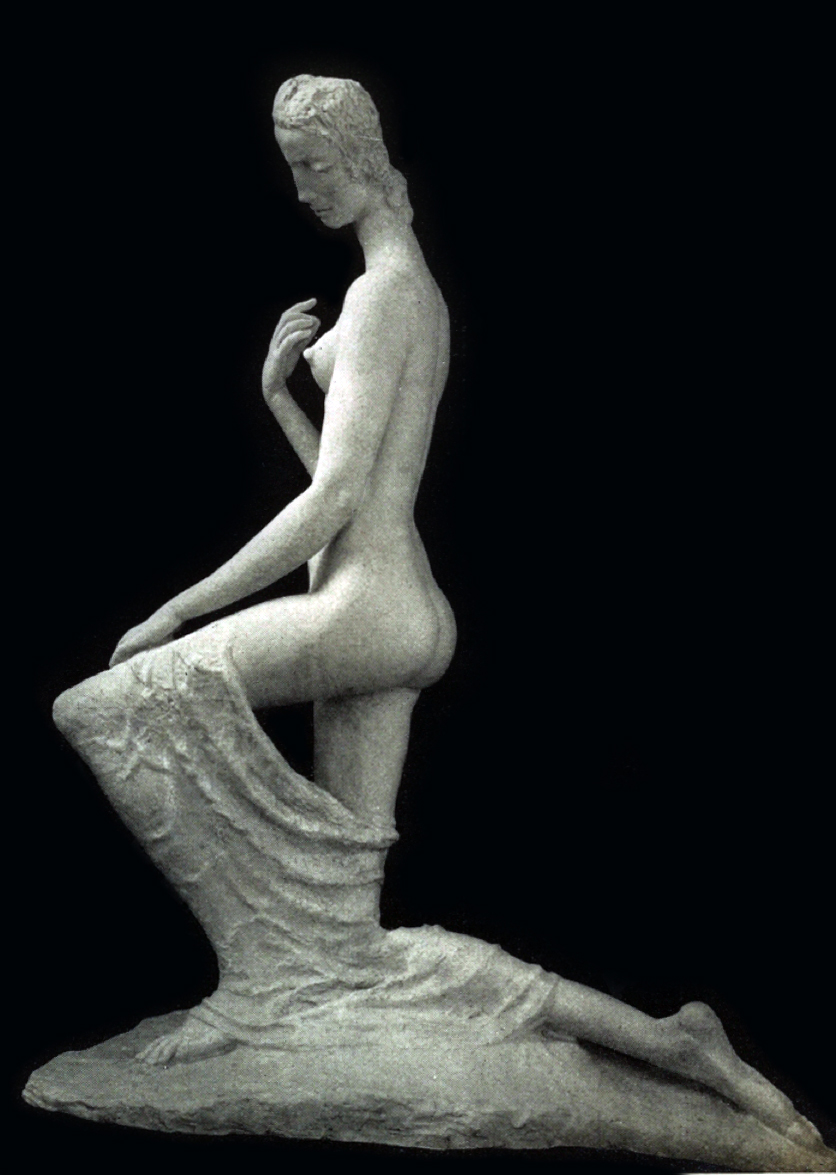
Wilhelm Lehmbruck, 1911, Femme á genoux (The Kneeling One), cast stone, 176 x 138 x 70 cm (69.2 x 54.5 x 27.5 in), Armory Show postcard

In 1912, Lehmbruck exhibited in the Folkwang Museum in Hagen, with Egon Schiele. In 1914, he had his first solo exhibition in Paris, at the Galerie Levesque. He contributed to an exhibition at the Grand Palais in Paris. From 1910–1914 he lived in Paris. He frequented the Café du Dôme, where he met sculptors such as Modigliani, Brâncuși, and Archipenko.

During World War I he served as a paramedic at a military hospital in Berlin. The suffering and misery he saw there are reflected in his late sculptures such as Fallen Man (1915–16). He suffered from severe depression and fled the war by going to Zürich at the end of 1916. There he made contact with the socialist, L. Rubiner, who collaborated on Franz Pfemfert's Die Aktion. He was elected to the Prussian Academy of Arts in Berlin in early 1919. After the war, he returned to Berlin where he committed suicide on 25 March 1919.

== Sculpture ==
Lehmbruck's sculptures mostly concentrate on the human body and are influenced by Naturalism and Expressionism. His works, including female nudes, are marked by a sense of melancholy and an elongation of form common to Gothic architecture.

Throughout his career, architect Ludwig Mies van der Rohe placed his friend Lehmbruck's sculptures and those of Aristide Maillol into his buildings and designs.

== Collections ==
The Lehmbruck Museum (Duisburg, Germany) has in its collection about 100 sculptures, 40 paintings, 900 drawings and 200 graphical works by Wilhelm Lehmbruck. The museum, named after Wilhelm Lehmbruck, was originally designed by his son, Manfred Lehmbruck (1913–1992).

The Honolulu Museum of Art, the Museum of Modern Art (New York City), the National Gallery of Art (Washington D.C.), Städel Museum (Frankfurt, Germany), the Neue Nationalgalerie (Berlin, Germany) and the Tate Gallery (London, England) are among the public collections holding works by Wilhelm Lehmbruck. One of his sculptures can be seen in the Villa Tugendhat.

== Gallery ==
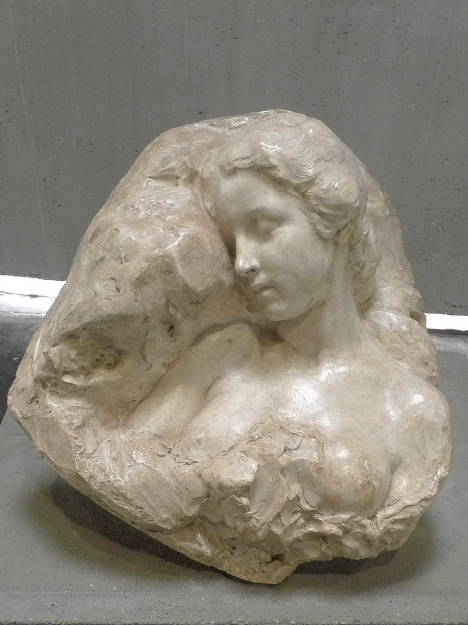
Schlaf (1907)

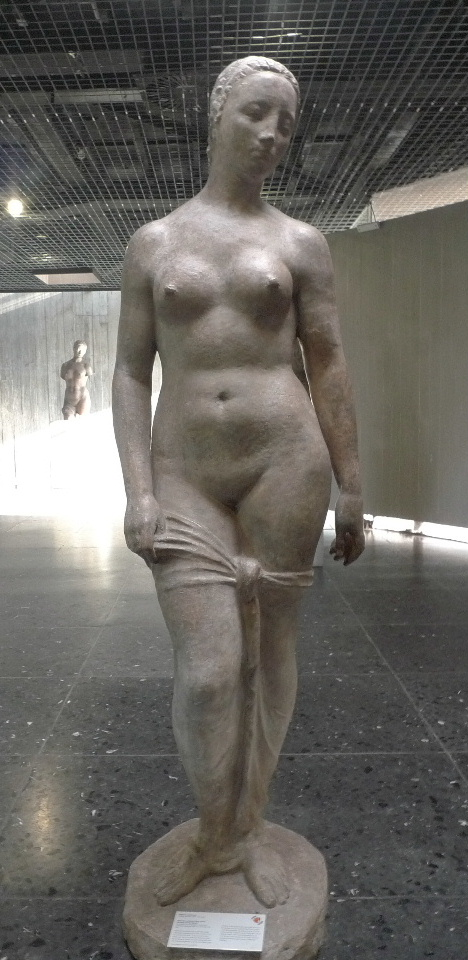
Stehende weibliche Figur (1910)

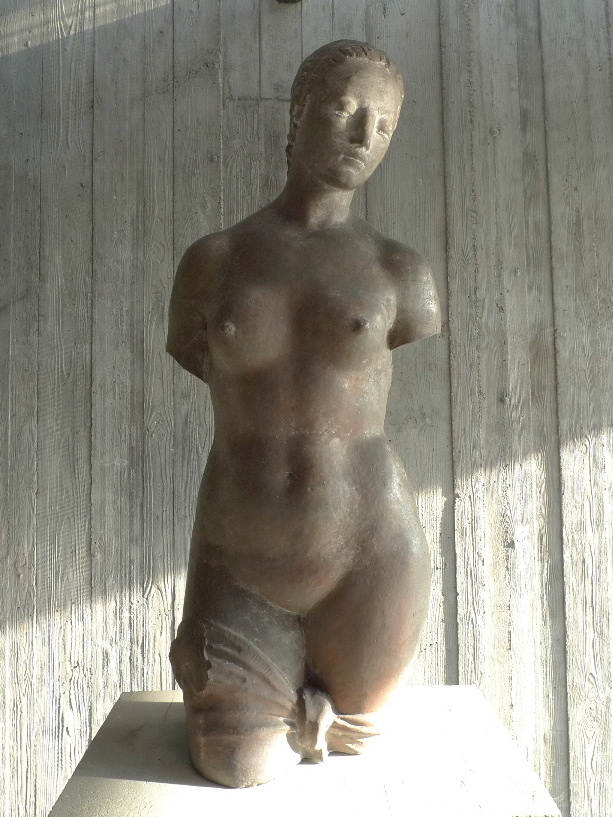
Weiblicher Torso (Torso der Großen Stehenden) (1910)

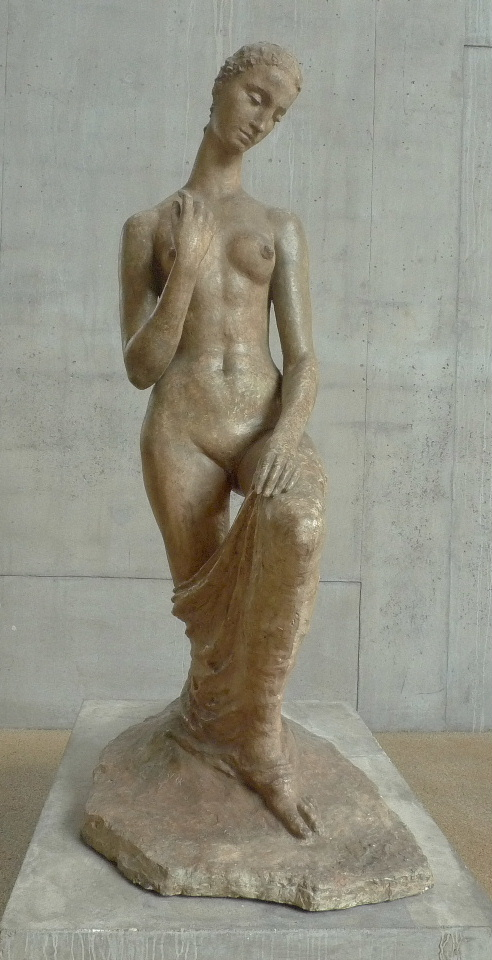
Kniende (1911)

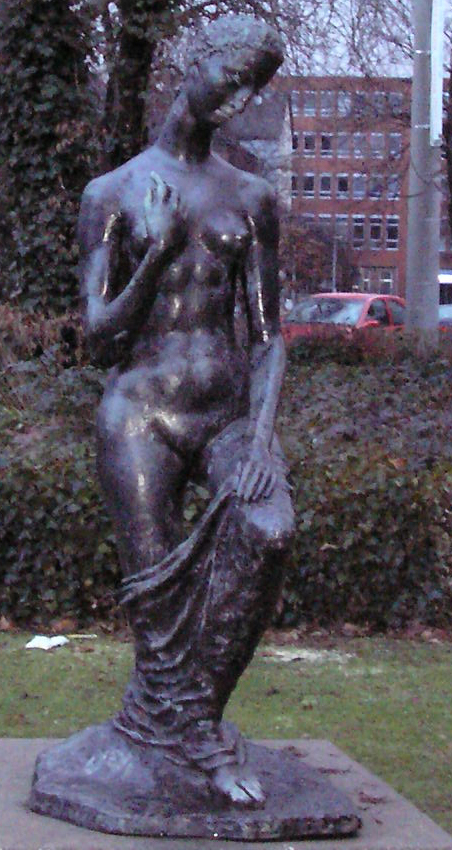
Kniende (c. 1911 - Bronze)

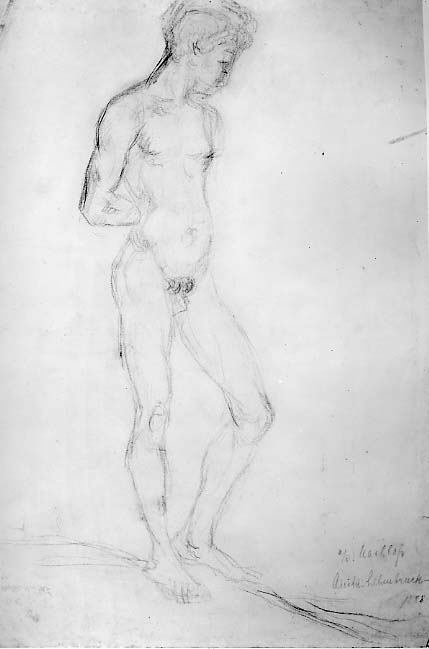
Male Nude Model at the Metropolitan Museum of Art (1912)

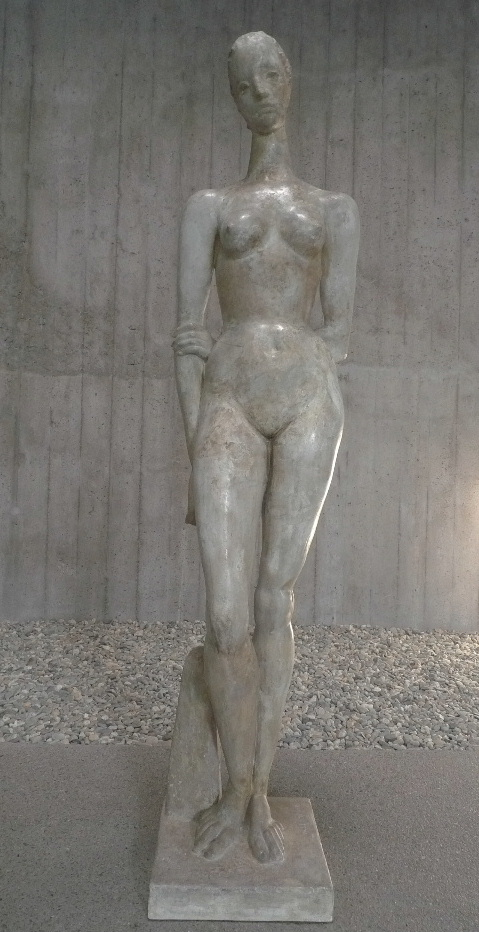
Große Sinnende (1913)

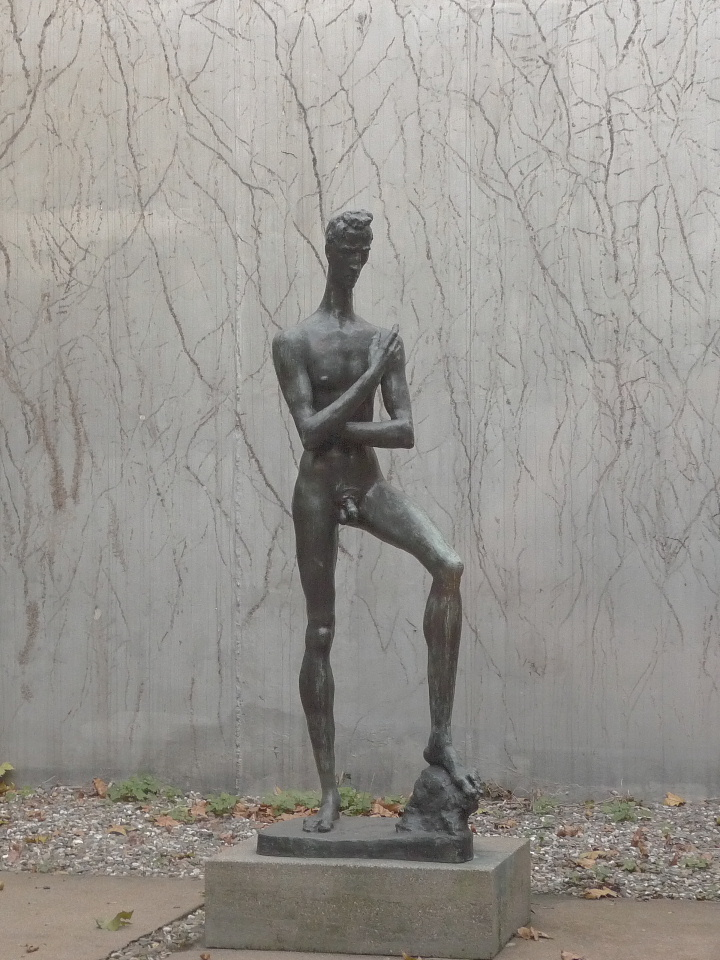
Emporsteigender Jüngling (1913)

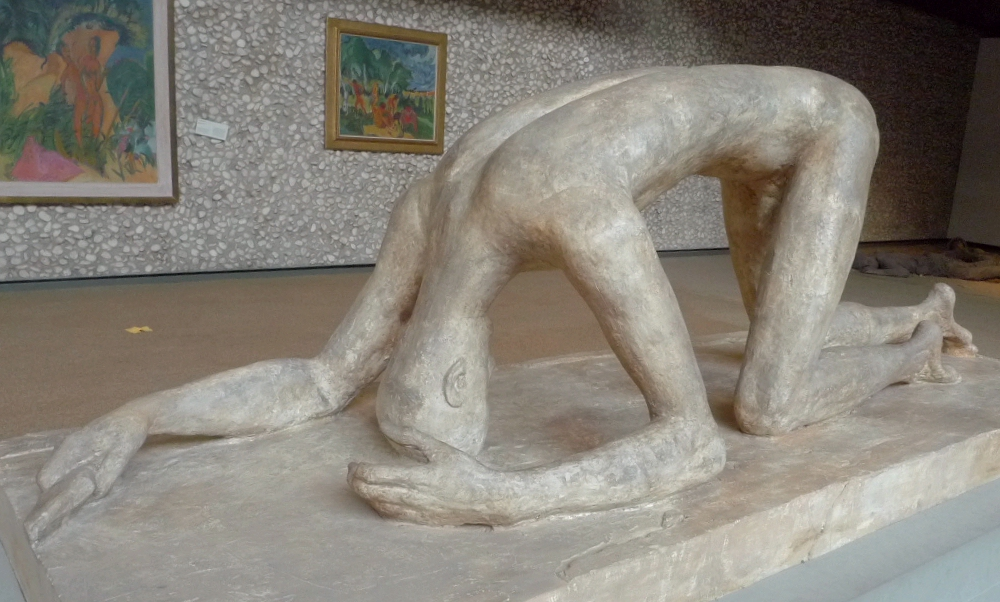
Der Gestürzte (1915/16)

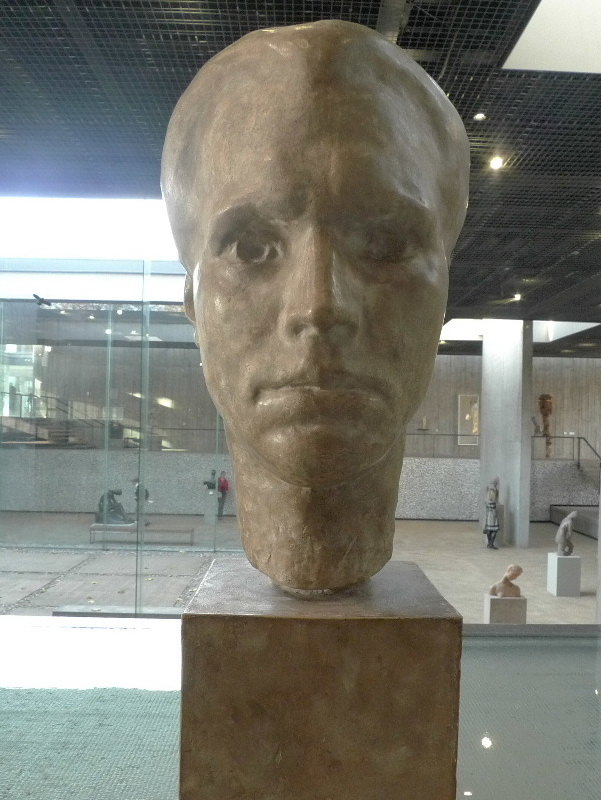
Porträtkopf Fritz von Unruh (1918)

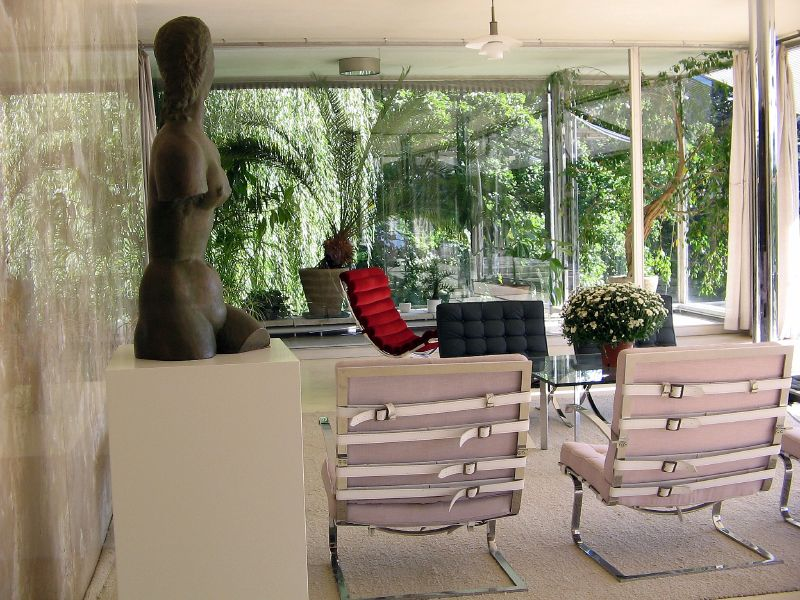
Interior of Villa Tugendhat with sculpture by Wilhelm Lehmbruck (foreground, left)

== See also ==
Lehmbruck-Museum

== Catalogue raisonné ==
- Erwin Petermann [ed..], Die Druckgraphik von Wilhelm Lehmbruck. Verzeichnis. Stuttgart: Hatje, 1964
- Gerhard Händler, Wilhelm Lehmbruck. Die Zeichnungen der Reifezeit. Stuttgart: Hatje, 1985, ISBN 3-7757-0188-5
- Margarita C. Lahusen, Wilhelm Lehmbruck. Gemälde und großformatige Zeichnungen. Munich: Hirmer, 1997, ISBN 3-7774-6370-1.
- Dietrich Schubert, Wilhelm Lehmbruck – Catalogue raisonné der Skulpturen (1898–1919). Worms: Wernersche Verlagsgesellschaft, 2001, ISBN 3-88462-172-6.
