= Werner Gilles =

German painter

Werner Gilles (29 August 1894 – 23 June 1961) was a German artist.

Gilles was born in Rheydt/Rheinland (today Mönchengladbach) He found his artistic calling while at the academies of Kassel and Weimar, studying under Lyonel Feininger of the Bauhaus school. He later moved after 1921 to Ischia, Italy. He moved to Düsseldorf in 1923, but between 1925 and 1930 he also worked in Berlin and Paris and lived in both during the period.

The Nazi regime named him as a degenerate artist from the 1930s, and he had to stop working until after the war. From 1951 he moved to München in the winter, and Ischia in the summer. He died in Essen in 1961.

== Major works ==
- 1933 to 1935 Arthur Rimbaud gewidmet
- 1947 to 1949 Orpheus, Akvarellsyklus
- 1950 Akvareller til Tibetanischen Totenbuch (the Tibetan book of death)

== Exhibitions ==
- 1948 24th Venice Biennale
- 1950 25th Venezia biennial
- 1955 documenta 1 in Kassel
- 1958 29th Venezia biennial
- 1959 documenta II in Kassel
- 1961 Kunstverein für die Rheinlande und Westfalen, Düsseldorf
- 1962 31st Venezia biennial
- 1964 documenta III in Kassel
- 1964 Kölnischer Kunstverein, Köln
- 1973 Landesmuseum Bonn
- 1984 Städtisches Museum, Mülheim an der Ruhr
- 2000 Galerie Vömel, Düsseldorf
- 2001 Künstler der Galerie Vömel, Düsseldorf
- 2002 Galerie Koch, Hannover
- 2005/2006 Ein Arkadien der Moderne: Villa Romana Neues Museum Weimar

== See also ==
- List of German painters
