= Hermann Blumenthal =

German sculptor

Hermann Blumenthal (31 December 1905, Essen, Rhine Province – 17 August 1942, near Kljasticy, Pskov Oblast, USSR) was a German sculptor. He was a participating artist in the documenta 1.

== Awards ==
- 1929: Preis der Stadt Köln anlässlich einer Ausstellung des Deutschen Künstlerbundes
- 1930: Großer Staatspreis of the Prussian Academy of Arts, verbunden mit einem Studienaufenthalt in der Villa Massimo, Rom
- 1935: Stipendium des Reichserziehungsministeriums, Studienaufenthalt in Kassel
- 1936: Rom-Stipendium des Reichserziehungsministeriums, Studienaufenthalt in der Villa Massimo
- 1937: Villa-Romana-Stipendium, Studienaufenthalt in Florenz
- 1939: Cornelius-Preis for Monumentalplastik der Stadt Düsseldorf
- 1955: Posthum Teilnehmer der documenta 1, Kassel

== Works ==
- 1929/39: Schreitender auf rechteckiger Platte, Bronze, H: 152 cm. Niedersächsischer Landtag, Hannover
- 1930: Kniender (Spinne), Bronze, H: 103 cm. Staatliche Museen zu Berlin, Nationalgalerie
- 1931/32: Kriechender (Adam), Bronze, H: 81 cm. Georg-Kolbe-Museum Berlin (Dauerleihgabe Nachlass Blumenthal)
- 1934: Acht Reliefentwürfe for the Museum Folkwang, Essen, Bronze/Gips, 58 x 40 cm. Georg-Kolbe-Museum Berlin (Dauerleihgabe Nachlass Blumenthal)
- 1935: Porträt Ludwig Kasper, Steinguss, H: 33 cm. Georg-Kolbe-Museum Berlin (Dauerleihgabe Nachlass Blumenthal)
- 1935/36: Großer Schreitender, Bronze, H: 180 cm. Hamburger Kunsthalle
- 1936: Sitzender aufschauend (Sterngucker), Bronze, H: 28 cm. Bayerische Staatsgemäldesammlungen München
- 1936/37: Großer Stehender (Römischer Mann), Steinguss, H: 202 cm. Georg-Kolbe-Museum Berlin (Dauerleihgabe Nachlass Blumenthal)
- 1937: Großer Kniender (Florentiner Mann), Bronze, H: 150 cm. Norddeutscher Rundfunk, Hamburg
- 1938: Zwei Reliefs für Brunnenstele: Jüngling mit Ölzweig; Zwei Frauen, Stein, 225 x 125. Ruhland (Lausitz), BASF Schwarzheide
