= Art competitions at the 1928 Summer Olympics =

Art competitions at the Games of the IX Olympiad
- Art competitions pictogram
- Venue: Stedelijk Museum
- Dates: 17 May – 12 August 1928
- No. of events: 13

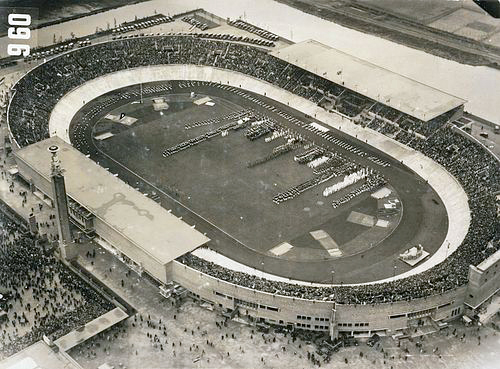
Jan Wils won the gold medal for the design of the Olympic Stadium in Amsterdam

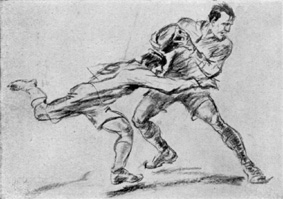
Rugby by Jean Jacoby

Art competitions were held as part of the 1928 Summer Olympics in Amsterdam, the Netherlands. Medals were awarded in five categories (architecture, literature, music, painting, and sculpture), for works inspired by sport-related themes.

The art exhibition was held at the Stedelijk Museum from 12 June to 12 August, and displayed 1150 works of art from 18 countries. Additionally, the literature competition attracted 40 entries from 10 countries, and the music competition had 22 entries from 9 countries. Contestants at the Amsterdam Olympics were given the opportunity for the first time to list their works of art as available for sale, though no mention of price or sales were permitted at the exhibitions.

The art competitions at the 1928 Games were larger in scope than for previous Games. Instead of a single competition in each of the five artistic categories, awards were presented in multiple subcategories. The judges of the music competition declined to award any medals in two of the three subcategories, and only presented a single bronze medal in the third.

Art competitions were part of the Olympic program from 1912 to 1948. At a meeting of the International Olympic Committee in 1949, it was decided to hold art exhibitions instead, as it was judged illogical to permit professionals to compete in the art competitions while only amateurs were permitted to compete in sporting events. Since 1952, a non-competitive art and cultural festival has been associated with each Game.

== Architecture ==
| Category | Gold | Silver | Bronze |
|---|---|---|---|
| Architectural design | Jan Wils (NED); Olympic Stadium at Amsterdam | Ejnar Mindedal Rasmussen (DEN); Swimming pool at Ollerup | Jacques Lambert (FRA); Stadium at Versailles |
| Town planning | Alfred Hensel (GER); Stadium at Nuremberg | Jacques Lambert (FRA); Stadium at Versailles | Max Laeuger (GER); Municipal Park at Hamburg |

== Literature ==
| Category | Gold | Silver | Bronze |
|---|---|---|---|
| Lyric works | Kazimierz Wierzyński (POL) "Laur Olimpijski" | Rudolf G. Binding (GER) "Reitvorschrift für eine Geliebte" | Johannes Weltzer (DEN) "Symphonia Heroica" |
| Dramatic works | none awarded | Lauro De Bosis (ITA) "Icarus" | none awarded |
| Epic works | Ferenc Mező (HUN) "L'histoire des Jeux Olympiques" | Ernst Weiß (GER) "Boetius von Orlamünde" | Carel Scharten & Margo Scharten-Antink (NED) "De Nar uit de Maremmen" |

== Music ==
| Category | Gold | Silver | Bronze |
|---|---|---|---|
| Song | none awarded | none awarded | none awarded |
| One instrument | none awarded | none awarded | none awarded |
| Orchestra | none awarded | none awarded | Rudolph Simonsen (DEN) "Symphony No. 2 Hellas" |

== Painting ==
| Category | Gold | Silver | Bronze |
|---|---|---|---|
| Paintings | Isaac Israëls (NED) "Cavalier Rouge" | Laura Knight (GBR) "Boxeurs" | Walther Klemm (GER) "Patinage" |
| Drawings | Jean Jacoby (LUX) "Rugby" | Alex Virot (FRA) "Gestes de Football" | Władysław Skoczylas (POL) "Archer" |
| Graphic works | William Nicholson (GBR) "Un Almanach de douze Sports" | Carl Moos (SUI) "Athletics Poster" | Max Feldbauer (GER) "Mailcoach" |

== Sculpture ==
| Category | Gold | Silver | Bronze |
|---|---|---|---|
| Statues | Paul Landowski (FRA) "Boxeur" | Milo Martin (SUI) "Athlète au repos" | Renée Sintenis (GER) "Footballeur" |
| Reliefs and medallions | Edwin Grienauer (AUT); Médailles | Chris van der Hoef (NED); Médaille pour les Jeux Olympiques | Edwin Scharff (GER); Plaquette |

== Medal table ==
At the time, medals were awarded to these artists, but art competitions are no longer regarded as official Olympic events by the International Olympic Committee. These events do not appear in the IOC medal database, and these totals are not included in the IOC's medal table for the 1928 Games.

| Rank | Nation | Gold | Silver | Bronze | Total |
|---|---|---|---|---|---|
| 1 | Netherlands (NED) | 2 | 1 | 1 | 4 |
| 2 | Germany (GER) | 1 | 2 | 5 | 8 |
| 3 | France (FRA) | 1 | 2 | 1 | 4 |
| 4 | Great Britain (GBR) | 1 | 1 | 0 | 2 |
| 5 | Poland (POL) | 1 | 0 | 1 | 2 |
| 6 | Austria (AUT) | 1 | 0 | 0 | 1 |
| 6 | Hungary (HUN) | 1 | 0 | 0 | 1 |
| 6 | Luxembourg (LUX) | 1 | 0 | 0 | 1 |
| 9 | Switzerland (SUI) | 0 | 2 | 0 | 2 |
| 10 | Denmark (DEN) | 0 | 1 | 2 | 3 |
| 11 | Italy (ITA) | 0 | 1 | 0 | 1 |
| Totals (11 entries) | | 9 | 10 | 10 | 29 |

== Events summary ==
=== Architecture ===
Designs for Town Planning

The following architects took part:

| Rank | Name | Country |
|---|---|---|
| 1 | Alfred Hensel | Germany |
| 2 | Jacques Lambert | France |
| 3 | Max Laeuger | Germany |

Architectural Designs

The following architects took part:

| Rank | Name | Country |
|---|---|---|
| 1 | Jan Wils | Netherlands |
| 2 | Ejnar Mindedal Rasmussen | Denmark |
| 3 | Jacques Lambert | France |

Further entries

The following architects took part:

| Rank | Name | Country |
|---|---|---|
| AC | Adolf Abel | Germany |
| AC | Hermann Alker | Germany |
| AC | Max Bromme | Germany |
| AC | Heinrich de Fries | Germany |
| AC | Karl Hoffmann | Germany |
| AC | Hans Hohloch | Germany |
| AC | Richard Konwiarz | Germany |
| AC | Otto Linne | Germany |
| AC | Werner March | Germany |
| AC | Emil Pohle | Germany |
| AC | Georg Holke | Germany |
| AC | Hubert Ritter | Germany |
| AC | Balduin Schilling | Germany |
| AC | Paul Wolf | Germany |
| AC | Ernst Stahl | Germany |
| AC | Emil Hoppe | Austria |
| AC | Jean Noé | Belgium |
| AC | Axel Høeg-Hansen | Denmark |
| AC | Niels Knudsen | Denmark |
| AC | Frits Schlegel | Denmark |
| AC | Arthur Wittmaack | Denmark |

| Rank | Name | Country |
|---|---|---|
| AC | Ralph Cram | United States |
| AC | Delano & Aldrich | United States |
| AC | Holabird & Roche | United States |
| AC | Albert Kahn | United States |
| AC | Charles Klauder | United States |
| AC | Lockwood, Greene & Co. | United States |
| AC | Benjamin Marshall | United States |
| AC | Proudfoot, Rawson & Souers | United States |
| AC | Rebori, Wentworth & Dewey | United States |
| AC | Horace Trumbauer | United States |
| AC | Zantzinger, Borie & Medary | United States |
| AC | Léopold Bévière | France |
| AC | Louis Bonnier | France |
| AC | Georges Fauvelle | France |
| AC | Jacques Lambert | France |
| AC | Paul Marozeau | France |
| AC | Louis Rey | France |
| AC | Pierre Souziff | France |
| AC | Guillaume Tronchet | France |
| AC | Alfréd Hajós | Hungary |
| AC | Ottorino Aloisio | Italy |

| Rank | Name | Country |
|---|---|---|
| AC | Duilio Torres | Italy |
| AC | Oscar Prati | Italy |
| AC | Paolo Vietti Violi | Italy |
| AC | Michel Ravarino | Monaco |
| AC | Ole Sverre | Norway |
| AC | Henri-Robert von der Mühll | Switzerland |
| AC | Jadwiga Dobrzyńska | Poland |
| AC | Zygmunt Łoboda | Poland |
| AC | Leon Suzin | Poland |
| AC | Mieczysław Łęczycki | Poland |
| AC | Józef Łęczycki | Poland |
| AC | Ludwik Oli | Poland |
| AC | Edgar Norwerth | Poland |
| AC | Erwin Barth | Germany |
| AC | Fernando Biscaccianti | Italy |
| AC | Ministero della Guerra | Italy |
| AC | Karl Pregizer | Germany |
| AC | Hermann Dieter | Germany |
| AC | Otto Schönthal | Austria |
| AC | Constantin Krage | Denmark |
| AC | Frederik Hvalsøe | Denmark |

=== Literature ===
Dramatic works

The following writers took part:

| Rank | Name | Country |
|---|---|---|
| 1 | Not awarded | |
| 2 | Lauro De Bosis | Italy |
| 3 | Not awarded | |
| AC | Plus que de Raison | France |
| AC | Henri van Wermeskerken | Netherlands |
| AC | Louis Grivel | Switzerland |
| AC | Voittout | Switzerland |

Epic works

The following writers took part:

| Rank | Name | Country |
|---|---|---|
| 1 | Ferenc Mező | Hungary |
| 2 | Ernst Weiß | Germany |
| 3 | Margo Scharten-Antink, Carel Scharten | Netherlands |
| AC | Theodor Mayer | Austria |
| AC | Willy Meisl | Austria |
| AC | Arthur Steiner | Austria |
| AC | Maurice Carême | Belgium |
| AC | Edvard Nielsen-Stevns | Denmark |
| AC | Kasimir Edschmid | Germany |
| AC | Hermann Roßmann | Germany |
| AC | Dezső Király | Hungary |
| AC | Henriëtte Laman Trip-de Beaufort | Netherlands |
| AC | Louis Grivel | Switzerland |
| AC | Voittout | Switzerland |

Lyric works

The following writers took part:

| Rank | Name | Country |
|---|---|---|
| 1 | Kazimierz Wierzyński | Poland |
| 2 | Rudolf Binding | Germany |
| 3 | Johannes Weltzer | Denmark |
| AC | H. J. Ken | Austria |
| AC | Willy Meisl | Austria |
| AC | Ludwig Valentich | Austria |
| AC | Tony Schaller | Belgium |
| AC | Maurice Verdonck | Belgium |
| AC | Het Lichtet Overal | Belgium |
| AC | Aage Hermann | Denmark |
| AC | Émile Moussat | France |
| AC | Et quasi cursores vitaï lampada tradunt | France |
| AC | Gerhart Drabsch | Germany |
| AC | Karl Schenk | Germany |
| AC | Bruno Fattori | Italy |
| AC | Edward Koster | Netherlands |
| AC | Kazimierz Przerwa-Tetmajer | Poland |
| AC | Willy Favez | Switzerland |
| AC | Voittout | Switzerland |

=== Music ===
Compositions for orchestra

The following composers took part:

| Rank | Name | Country |
|---|---|---|
| 1 | not awarded | |
| 2 | not awarded | |
| 3 | Rudolph Simonsen | Denmark |
| AC | L. Vandeput | Belgium |
| AC | Knudåge Riisager | Denmark |
| AC | Marc-César Scotto | Monaco |
| AC | Jacques Jansen | Netherlands |
| AC | Kazimierz Kresowiak | Poland |
| AC | Alexandre Dénéréaz | Switzerland |
| AC | B. Bosserdet | Switzerland |
| AC | IXe Olympiade Amsterdam | Switzerland |

Compositions for solo or chorus

The following composers took part:

| Rank | Name | Country |
|---|---|---|
| 1 | not awarded | |
| 2 | not awarded | |
| 3 | not awarded | |
| AC | Chant Olympique | France |
| AC | Peter Schmitz | Germany |
| AC | Jan Andenne | Netherlands |
| AC | Marius Ulfrstad | Norway |
| AC | Roger Moret | Switzerland |

Compositions for instrumental and chamber

The following composers took part:

| Rank | Name | Country |
|---|---|---|
| 1 | not awarded | |
| 2 | not awarded | |
| 3 | not awarded | |
| AC | Sijoma | Belgium |
| AC | Marius Ulfrstad | Norway |
| AC | Simon Frey | Switzerland |
| AC | Roger Moret | Switzerland |
| AC | IXe Olympiade Amsterdam | Switzerland |

=== Painting ===
Drawings and water colours

The following painters took part:

| Rank | Name | Country |
|---|---|---|
| 1 | Jean Jacoby | Luxembourg |
| 2 | Alex Virot | France |
| 3 | Władysław Skoczylas | Poland |
| AC | Artur Brusenbauch | Austria |
| AC | Erwin Lang | Austria |
| AC | Willia Menzel | Belgium |
| AC | Alfred Schuermans | Belgium |
| AC | Lucienne Pageot-Rousseaux | France |
| AC | Maxwell Ayrton | Great Britain |
| AC | Henry Bateman | Great Britain |
| AC | Lewis Baumer | Great Britain |
| AC | George Belcher | Great Britain |
| AC | Cecil Ross Burnett | Great Britain |
| AC | Lionel Edwards | Great Britain |
| AC | David Ghilchik | Great Britain |
| AC | Frank Gillett | Great Britain |
| AC | Reginald Higgins | Great Britain |
| AC | Cecil King | Great Britain |

| Rank | Name | Country |
|---|---|---|
| AC | Tom Purvis | Great Britain |
| AC | Frank Reynolds | Great Britain |
| AC | E. H. Shepard | Great Britain |
| AC | Charles Simpson | Great Britain |
| AC | George Stampa | Great Britain |
| AC | Anton van Anrooy | Great Britain |
| AC | Leonard Walker | Great Britain |
| AC | Ludwig von Hofmann | Germany |
| AC | Willy Jaeckel | Germany |
| AC | Rudolf Koch | Germany |
| AC | Emil Rudolf Weiss | Germany |
| AC | Tibor Gergely | Hungary |
| AC | Kathleen Bridle | Ireland |
| AC | Lilian Davidson | Ireland |
| AC | Harry Kernoff | Ireland |
| AC | Edward Louis Lawrenson | Ireland |
| AC | Stella Steyn | Ireland |
| AC | Friedrich Baur | Latvia |

| Rank | Name | Country |
|---|---|---|
| AC | Cees Bolding | Netherlands |
| AC | David Bueno de Mesquita | Netherlands |
| AC | Geert Grauss | Netherlands |
| AC | Felix Hess | Netherlands |
| AC | Willy Sluiter | Netherlands |
| AC | Jan Sluijters | Netherlands |
| AC | Jelle Troelstra | Netherlands |
| AC | Bertha van Hasselt | Netherlands |
| AC | Jaap Weyand | Netherlands |
| AC | Michał Boruciński | Poland |
| AC | Stanisław Noakowski | Poland |
| AC | Wacław Piotrowski | Poland |
| AC | William Aldrich | United States |
| AC | Louis Bonniot de Fleurac | France |
| AC | Gaboriau | France |
| AC | Juillerat | France |
| AC | Maurice Pellerier | France |
| AC | Georges Scott | France |

Graphic arts

The following painters took part:

| Rank | Name | Country |
|---|---|---|
| 1 | William Nicholson | Great Britain |
| 2 | Carl Moos | Switzerland |
| 3 | Max Feldbauer | Germany |
| AC | John Platt | Great Britain |
| AC | Gerald Spencer Pryse | Great Britain |
| AC | Steven Spurrier | Great Britain |
| AC | Norman Wilkinson | Great Britain |
| AC | Ernst Aufseeser | Germany |
| AC | Ernst Böhm | Germany |
| AC | Fritz Heinsheimer | Germany |

| Rank | Name | Country |
|---|---|---|
| AC | Hanns Hoyer | Germany |
| AC | Walther Klemm | Germany |
| AC | Max Slevogt | Germany |
| AC | Arthur Wellmann | Germany |
| AC | Max Liebermann | Germany |
| AC | Anton Versluijs | Netherlands |
| AC | Aleksander Kłopotowski | Poland |
| AC | Maria Brodacka | Poland |
| AC | Maria Dunin | Poland |
| AC | Janina Kaczkowska | Poland |

| Rank | Name | Country |
|---|---|---|
| AC | Leonia Nadelman | Poland |
| AC | Wanda Pleszczyńska | Poland |
| AC | Stanisław Prauss | Poland |
| AC | Władysław Skoczylas | Poland |
| AC | Bolesław Surałło | Poland |
| AC | Eduard Büsser | Switzerland |
| AC | Jean Raoul Chaurand-Naurac | France |
| AC | Maurice Ménardeau | France |
| AC | Elie de la Morinière | France |

Paintings

The following painters took part:

| Rank | Name | Country |
|---|---|---|
| 1 | Isaac Israëls | Netherlands |
| 2 | Laura Knight | Great Britain |
| 3 | Walther Klemm | Germany |
| AC | Ludwig Graf | Austria |
| AC | Ernst Huber | Austria |
| AC | Ferdinand Kitt | Austria |
| AC | Erwin Lang | Austria |
| AC | Sergius Pauser | Austria |
| AC | Heinrich Révy | Austria |
| AC | Lilly Steiner | Austria |
| AC | Ludwig Wieden | Austria |
| AC | Georg Mayer-Marton | Austria |
| AC | Joseph Dierickx | Belgium |
| AC | Joe Bridge | France |
| AC | Jane Deley | France |
| AC | Édouard Fraisse | France |
| AC | Charles Kiffer-Porte | France |
| AC | Lucienne Pageot-Rousseaux | France |
| AC | Georges Rasetti | France |
| AC | Edgar Seligman | Great Britain |
| AC | Anna Airy | Great Britain |
| AC | Denholm Armour | Great Britain |
| AC | Arthur Burgess | Great Britain |
| AC | Charles Cundall | Great Britain |
| AC | Harold Knight | Great Britain |
| AC | Maurice Lambert | Great Britain |
| AC | John Lavery | Great Britain |
| AC | Alfred Munnings | Great Britain |
| AC | William Nicholson | Great Britain |
| AC | Charles Pears | Great Britain |
| AC | Gerald Spencer Pryse | Great Britain |
| AC | Walter Russell | Great Britain |
| AC | Charles Simpson | Great Britain |
| AC | Harold Speed | Great Britain |
| AC | Anton van Anrooy | Great Britain |
| AC | Leonard Walker | Great Britain |
| AC | George Watson | Great Britain |
| AC | William Orpen | Great Britain |
| AC | August Babberger | Germany |
| AC | Willi Baumeister | Germany |
| AC | Erich Büttner | Germany |
| AC | Theo Champion | Germany |
| AC | Max Clarenbach | Germany |
| AC | Otto Dill | Germany |
| AC | Georg Gelbke | Germany |
| AC | George Grosz | Germany |
| AC | Erich Heckel | Germany |
| AC | Franz Heckendorf | Germany |

| Rank | Name | Country |
|---|---|---|
| AC | Fritz Heinsheimer | Germany |
| AC | Ludwig von Hofmann | Germany |
| AC | Eduard Hopf | Germany |
| AC | Willy Jaeckel | Germany |
| AC | Ernst Oppler | Germany |
| AC | Paul Paeschke | Germany |
| AC | Max Slevogt | Germany |
| AC | Gertraud Stemmler | Germany |
| AC | Gert Wollheim | Germany |
| AC | Lenigret Mallwitz | Germany |
| AC | Wolf Röhricht | Germany |
| AC | Tibor Gergely | Hungary |
| AC | Kathleen Bridle | Ireland |
| AC | Lilian Davidson | Ireland |
| AC | Mainie Jellett | Ireland |
| AC | Seán Keating | Ireland |
| AC | Harry Kernoff | Ireland |
| AC | Dermod O'Brien | Ireland |
| AC | Ferruccio Pasqui | Italy |
| AC | Konstantīns Visotskis | Latvia |
| AC | Jean Jacoby | Luxembourg |
| AC | Ángel Zárraga | Mexico |
| AC | Auguste Philippe Marocco | Monaco |
| AC | Lizzy Ansingh | Netherlands |
| AC | Rie de Balbian Verster-Bolderheij | Netherlands |
| AC | Ed Gerdes | Netherlands |
| AC | Geert Grauss | Netherlands |
| AC | Engelina Hameetman-Schlette | Netherlands |
| AC | Otto Hanrath | Netherlands |
| AC | Chris Huidekooper | Netherlands |
| AC | Jan Kleintjes | Netherlands |
| AC | Cornelis Kloos | Netherlands |
| AC | Harrie Kuyten | Netherlands |
| AC | Thies Luijt | Netherlands |
| AC | Henri MacLean | Netherlands |
| AC | Kees Maks | Netherlands |
| AC | Martin Monnickendam | Netherlands |
| AC | Albert Mulder | Netherlands |
| AC | Nicolaas Pieneman | Netherlands |
| AC | David Schulman | Netherlands |
| AC | Jos Seckel | Netherlands |
| AC | Jan Sluijters | Netherlands |
| AC | Coba Surie | Netherlands |
| AC | Bern van Beek | Netherlands |
| AC | Piet van den Bergh | Netherlands |
| AC | Nicolaas van der Waay | Netherlands |
| AC | Gerrit van Duffelen | Netherlands |
| AC | Kees van Waning | Netherlands |

| Rank | Name | Country |
|---|---|---|
| AC | Adriaan van 't Hoff | Netherlands |
| AC | Gerard Westermann | Netherlands |
| AC | Jaap Weyand | Netherlands |
| AC | Leon Dołżycki | Poland |
| AC | Włastimil Hofmann | Poland |
| AC | Władysław Jarocki | Poland |
| AC | Zygmunt Kamiński | Poland |
| AC | Wojciech Kossak | Poland |
| AC | Roman Kramsztyk | Poland |
| AC | Wacław Piotrowski | Poland |
| AC | Zygmunt Rozwadowski | Poland |
| AC | Kazimierz Sichulski | Poland |
| AC | Władysław Skoczylas | Poland |
| AC | Ludomir Sleńdziński | Poland |
| AC | Jerzy Zaruba | Poland |
| AC | Irving Couse | United States |
| AC | Walter Granville-Smith | United States |
| AC | Childe Hassam | United States |
| AC | Hunt Diederich | United States |
| AC | John Johansen | United States |
| AC | Hayley Lever | United States |
| AC | Jonas Lie | United States |
| AC | Patrick O'Connor | United States |
| AC | Roderic O'Connor | United States |
| AC | Carl Rungius | United States |
| AC | Eugen Weisz | United States |
| AC | Charles Morris Young | United States |
| AC | Henri Barnoin | France |
| AC | Eugène Delécluse | France |
| AC | Louis Denis-Valvérane | France |
| AC | Raoul du Gardier | France |
| AC | Gaston Gélibert | France |
| AC | F. Gras | France |
| AC | Paul Jobert | France |
| AC | R. Laisné | France |
| AC | Rémy Landeau | France |
| AC | Louis Malespina | France |
| AC | Henry Malfroy | France |
| AC | Auguste Matisse | France |
| AC | Maurice Ménardeau | France |
| AC | Elie de la Morinière | France |
| AC | Daniel Octobre | France |
| AC | René Quillivic | France |
| AC | Albert Fernand-Renault | France |
| AC | Alphonse Roubichou | France |
| AC | Gustave Salgé | France |
| AC | Charles Martin-Sauvaigo | France |
| AC | Henri Zo | France |

=== Sculpture ===
Medals and Reliefs

The following sculptors took part:

| Rank | Name | Country |
|---|---|---|
| 1 | Edwin Grienauer | Austria |
| 2 | Chris van der Hoef | Netherlands |
| 3 | Edwin Scharff | Germany |
| AC | Pierre de Soete | Belgium |
| AC | Oskar Gloeckler | Germany |
| AC | Ernst Gorsemann | Germany |
| AC | Kurt Harald Isenstein | Germany |
| AC | Richard Langer | Germany |
| AC | Waldemar Raemisch | Germany |
| AC | Hans Schwegerle | Germany |
| AC | Elisabeth von Esseö | Germany |
| AC | Theodor von Gosen | Germany |
| AC | Josef Wackerle | Germany |
| AC | Richard Scheibe | Germany |
| AC | Giuseppe Cassioli | Italy |
| AC | Leen Bolle | Netherlands |
| AC | Władysław Gruberski | Poland |
| AC | Josef Büsser | Switzerland |
| AC | Samuel Henchoz | Switzerland |
| AC | André Pettineroli | Switzerland |
| AC | James Fraser | United States |
| AC | Henri Dropsy | France |
| AC | Édouard Fraisse | France |

Statues

The following sculptors took part:

| Rank | Name | Country |
|---|---|---|
| 1 | Paul Landowski | France |
| 2 | Milo Martin | Switzerland |
| 3 | Renée Sintenis | Germany |
| AC | Franz Barwig | Austria |
| AC | Ferdinand Opitz | Austria |
| AC | Adolf Wagner | Austria |
| AC | Alphonse De Cuyper | Belgium |
| AC | Guillaume Dumont | Belgium |
| AC | Herman Pick | Belgium |
| AC | Leon Sarteel | Belgium |
| AC | Pierre de Soete | Belgium |
| AC | Géo Verbanck | Belgium |
| AC | Tait McKenzie | Canada |
| AC | Viggo Jarl | Denmark |
| AC | Suzanne de Sainte-Croix | France |
| AC | Berthe Girardet | France |
| AC | Raymond Rivoire | France |
| AC | Constant Roux | France |
| AC | Gilbert Bayes | Great Britain |
| AC | William Dick | Great Britain |
| AC | Paul Berger | Germany |
| AC | Arno Breker | Germany |
| AC | Ernesto de Fiori | Germany |
| AC | Carl Egler | Germany |
| AC | Eberhard Encke | Germany |
| AC | Hermann Hahn | Germany |
| AC | August Kraus | Germany |
| AC | Max Laeuger | Germany |

| Rank | Name | Country |
|---|---|---|
| AC | Gerhard Marcks | Germany |
| AC | Ottmar Obermaier | Germany |
| AC | Alexander Oppler | Germany |
| AC | Wolfgang Schaper | Germany |
| AC | Hans Schwegerle | Germany |
| AC | Franz von Stuck | Germany |
| AC | Fred Voelckerling | Germany |
| AC | William Wauer | Germany |
| AC | Georg Kolbe | Germany |
| AC | Lajos Petri | Hungary |
| AC | Oliver Sheppard | Ireland |
| AC | Carlo Fontana | Italy |
| AC | Toon Dupuis | Netherlands |
| AC | Jan Kriege | Netherlands |
| AC | Gra Rueb | Netherlands |
| AC | Henriëtte Vaillant | Netherlands |
| AC | Olga Niewska | Poland |
| AC | Pietro Borsari | Switzerland |
| AC | Charles L'Éplattenier | Switzerland |
| AC | August Peisker | Switzerland |
| AC | Julius Schwyzer | Switzerland |
| AC | Robert Aitken | United States |
| AC | Ruth Ball | United States |
| AC | Chester Beach | United States |
| AC | Nessa Cohen | United States |
| AC | John Donoghue | United States |
| AC | Laura Gardin Fraser | United States |

| Rank | Name | Country |
|---|---|---|
| AC | Charles Hafner | United States |
| AC | Hunt Diederich | United States |
| AC | Anna Hyatt Huntington | United States |
| AC | Hermon Atkins MacNeil | United States |
| AC | Paul Manship | United States |
| AC | Carl Mose | United States |
| AC | Andrew O'Connor | United States |
| AC | Alexander Proctor | United States |
| AC | Charles Rumsey | United States |
| AC | Janet Scudder | United States |
| AC | Philip Sears | United States |
| AC | Abastenia St. Leger Eberle | United States |
| AC | John Quincy Ward | United States |
| AC | Adolph Weinman | United States |
| AC | Evelyn Batchelder | United States |
| AC | Louis d'Ambrosio | France |
| AC | Pierre Christophe | France |
| AC | Jean Joire | France |
| AC | Albert-Léon Lebarque | France |
| AC | Marcel Mérignargues | France |
| AC | Eugène Molineau | France |
| AC | Paul Moreau-Vauthier | France |
| AC | Gaston Petit | France |
| AC | Hippolyte Peyrol | France |
| AC | Gilbert Privat | France |
| AC | René Quillivic | France |
| AC | Jacques-Louis Villeneuve | France |
