= Łęczycki (surname) =

Łęczycki (feminine: Łęczycka; plural: Łęczyccy) is a Polish surname. Notable people with the surname include:

- Józef Łęczycki, Polish architect
- Mieczysław Łęczycki, Polish architect
- Mikołaj Łęczycki (1574–1653), Polish theologian
