= Hohloch =

Hohloch is a surname of German origin. Notable people with the name include:

- Dennis Hohloch (born 1991), German politician (AfD)
- Hans Hohloch (1900–1976), German architect
- Johanna Hohloch (born 1964), Austrian television actress
- Mary Khan-Hohloch (born Khan; 1994), German politician (AfD)
