= Kaczkowski =

Kaczkowski (feminine: Kaczkowska) is a Polish surname. Notable people with the surname include:

- Jan Kaczkowski (1977–2016), Polish Roman Catholic priest and theologian
- Janina Kaczkowska (1904–1995), Polish painter
- Jerzy Kaczkowski (1938–1988), Polish weightlifter
- Justyna Kaczkowska (born 1997), Polish racing cyclist
- Zygmunt Kaczkowski (1825–1896), Polish writer and Austrian spy
