= Malfroy =

Malfroy is a surname. Notable people with the surname include:

- Cam Malfroy (1909–1966), New Zealand tennis player
- Camille Malfroy (1839–1897), New Zealand engineer and local politician
- Henry Malfroy (1895–1945), French painter
- Jules Malfroy (1901–1973), New Zealand lawyer and rugby union international
