= Mallwitz =

Mallwitz is a German language surname. Notable people with the name include:

- Alfred Mallwitz (1919–1986), victim of witch hunts in Neustettin
- Arthur Mallwitz (1880–1968), German athlete
- Joana Mallwitz (born 1986), German conductor and pianist
- Lenigret Mallwitz (1892–1969), German painter
