= Louis Rey =

Louis Rey may refer to:

- Louis Emmanuel Rey (1768–1846), French army general
- Louis Rey (architect), French architect
