= Bueno de Mesquita =

Bueno de Mesquita may refer to:

- Abraham Bueno de Mesquita (1918–2005), Dutch comedian, actor and stage artist
- Bruce Bueno de Mesquita (born 1946), political scientist, professor at New York University, and senior fellow at the Hoover Institution
- David Bueno de Mesquita (1889–1962), Dutch painter
- Max Bueno de Mesquita (1913-2001), Dutch painter, sculptor and graphic artist
