= Paul Berger =

Paul Berger may refer to:

- Paul Berger (physician) (1845–1908), French physician and surgeon
- Paul Berger (sculptor) (1889–1949), German sculptor
- Paul R. Berger (born 1963), professor in electrical and computer engineering

== See also ==
- Paul Burger (1877–1933), Belgian racing cyclist
