= Hanns Hoyer =

German painter

- Born: 19 September 1886; Kempen, Germany
- Died: 16 January 1960 (aged 73); Berlin, Germany
- Occupation: Painter

Hanns Thaddäus Hoyer (19 September 1886 – 16 January 1960) was a German painter. His work was part of the painting event in the art competition at the 1928 Summer Olympics.
