= Maria Brodacka =

Polish painter

- Born: 22 March 1904; Lviv, Ukraine
- Died: 19 January 1991 (aged 86); Lesko, Poland
- Occupation: Painter

Maria Brodacka (22 March 1904 – 19 January 1991) was a Polish painter. Her work was part of the painting event in the art competition at the 1928 Summer Olympics.
