= Bertha van Hasselt =

Dutch painter

- Born: 22 September 1878; Zwolle, Netherlands
- Died: 11 June 1932 (aged 53); Nijmegen, Netherlands
- Occupation: Painter

Bertha van Hasselt (22 September 1878 – 11 June 1932) was a Dutch painter. Her work was part of the painting event in the art competition at the 1928 Summer Olympics.
