= Harrie Kuyten =

Dutch painter

- Born: 19 December 1883; Utrecht, Netherlands
- Died: 29 January 1952 (aged 68); Schoorl, Netherlands
- Occupation: Painter

Harrie Kuyten (19 December 1883 – 29 January 1952) was a Dutch painter. His work was part of the painting event in the art competition at the 1928 Summer Olympics. Kuyten's work was included in the 1939 exhibition and sale Onze Kunst van Heden (Our Art of Today) at the Rijksmuseum in Amsterdam.
