= Ernst Gorsemann =

German sculptor

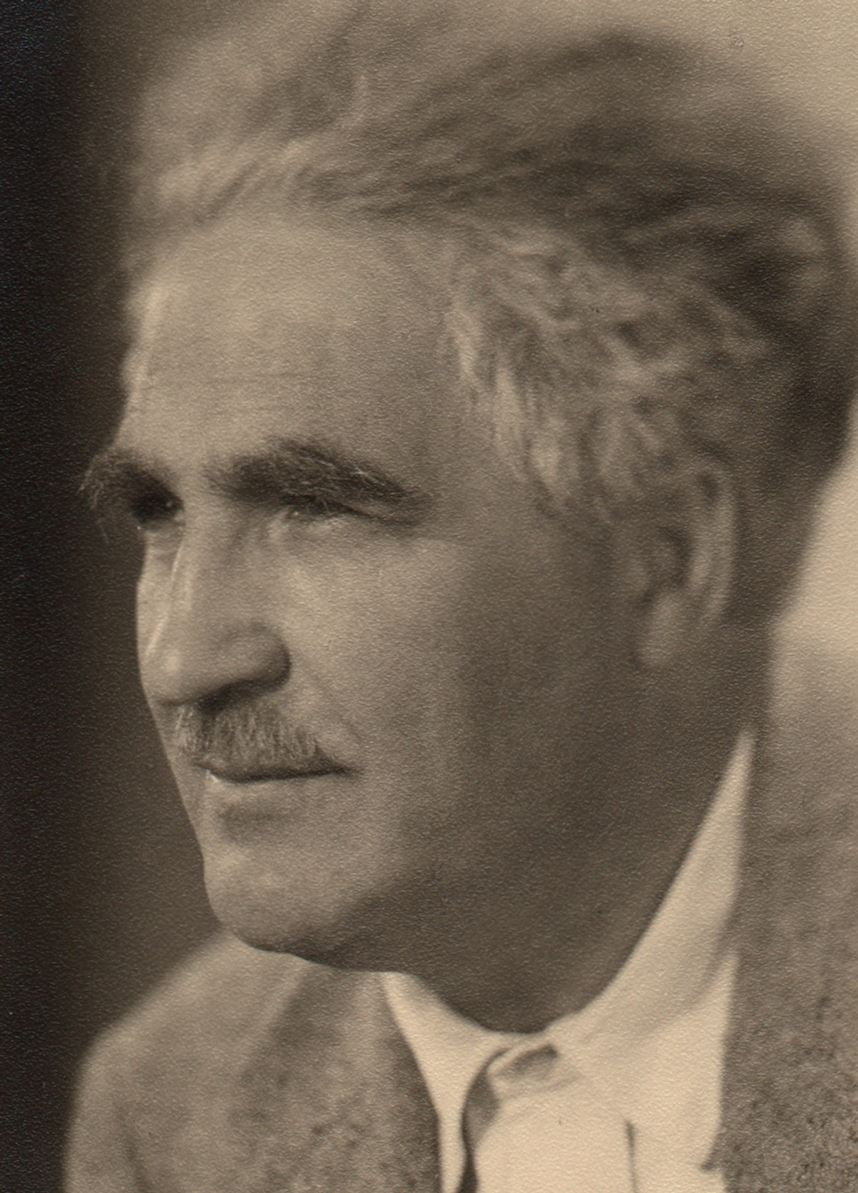
- Born: 15 February 1886; Bremen, Germany
- Died: 19 July 1960 (aged 74); Bremen, Germany
- Occupation: Sculptor

Ernst Gorsemann (15 February 1886 – 19 July 1960) was a German sculptor. His work was part of the sculpture event in the art competition at the 1928 Summer Olympics.
