= Duilio Torres =

Italian architect

- Born: 14 August 1882; Venice, Italy
- Died: 28 June 1972 (aged 89); Venice, Italy
- Occupation: Architect

Duilio Torres (14 August 1882 – 28 June 1972) was an Italian architect. Torres was a master builder in Venice, and his work was part of the architecture event in the art competition at the 1928 Summer Olympics.
