= Patrick O'Connor (painter) =

American painter

- Born: May 6, 1909; France
- Died: April 27, 1997 (aged 87); Palm Beach, Florida, United States
- Occupation: Painter

Patrick O'Connor (May 6, 1909 – April 27, 1997) was an American painter. His work was part of the painting event in the art competition at the 1928 Summer Olympics.
