= Eduard Hopf =

German painter (1901–1973)

- Born: 10 January 1901; Hanau, Germany
- Died: 19 November 1973 (aged 72); Hamburg, Germany
- Occupation: Painter

Eduard Hopf (10 January 1901 – 19 November 1973) was a German painter. His work was part of the painting event in the art competition at the 1928 Summer Olympics.

== Bibliography ==
- Maike Bruhns: "Hopf, Eduard". In: Franklin Kopitzsch, Dirk Brietzke (eds.): Hamburgische Biografie. Band 5. Wallstein, Göttingen 2010, ISBN 9783835306400, pp. 192–194
- Holger Carstensen: Eduard Hopf. Figur und Bewegung. Exhibition catalogue, Hamburg 2013
- Holger Carstensen: Eduard Hopf. Nordische Landschaft. AExhibition catalogue, Hamburg 2012
- Günter Grundmann (ed.): Eduard Hopf. Das zerstörte Lübeck. Sechzig Kreidezeichnungen aus dem Jahre 1942. Christians, Hamburg 1973
- Uwe Haupenthal: Eduard Hopf. Malerei und grafische Arbeiten. Verlag der Kunst Dresden, Dresden 2010, ISBN 9783865300942
- Katharina Heise, Marcus Andrew Hurttig, Ulrich Luckhardt (eds.): Hamburger Ansichten - Maler sehen die Stadt. Hamburger Kunsthalle, 9 October 2009 to 14 February 2010. Wienand Verlag, Köln 2009, ISBN 9783868320183, p. 188
- Karl-Heinz Weidner: Die "Mappe" des Hamburger Malers und Graphikers Eduard Hopf. Fischer, Aachen 2006, ISBN 3895145947
- Palmarum 1942: Kreidezeichnungen von Eduard Hopf zur Bombardierung Lübecks; anlässlich der Ausstellung im Kulturforum Burgkloster zu Lübeck vom 29.3. - 26.5.02. Kulturforum Burgkloster, Lübeck 2002
- "Eduard Hopf". In: Hans Vollmer (ed.): Allgemeines Lexikon der bildenden Künstler des XX. Jahrhunderts. Band 2: E–J. E. A. Seemann, Leipzig 1955, p. 484
