= Henriëtte Laman Trip-de Beaufort =

Dutch writer

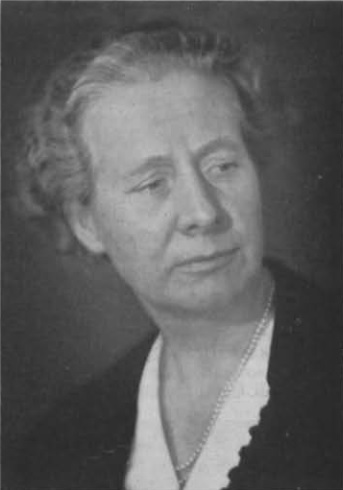
- Born: 13 October 1890; Baarn, Netherlands
- Died: 26 March 1982 (aged 91); Bennekom, Netherlands
- Occupation: Writer

Henriëtte Laman Trip-de Beaufort, born Agathe Henriette Maria de Beaufort (13 October 1890 – 26 March 1982), was a Dutch writer. Her work was part of the literature event in the art competition at the 1928 Summer Olympics.
