= Jacques-Louis Villeneuve =

French sculptor

- Born: 1 January 1865; Bassan, France
- Died: 16 February 1933 (aged 68); Paris, France
- Occupation: Sculptor

Jacques-Louis Villeneuve (1 January 1865 – 16 February 1933) was a French sculptor. His work was part of the sculpture event in the art competition at the 1928 Summer Olympics.
