= Georg Holke =

German architect

- Born: 29 January 1891; Potsdam, Germany
- Died: 30 April 1977 (aged 86); Detmold, Germany
- Occupation: Architect

Georg Holke (29 January 1891 – 30 April 1977) was a German architect. His work was part of the architecture event in the art competition at the 1928 Summer Olympics.
