= Josef Büsser =

Swiss sculptor

Josef Eduard Büsser (5 April 1896 – 17 September 1952) was a Swiss painter, sculptor and art teacher. His work was part of the sculpture event in the art competition at the 1928 Summer Olympics.

A memorial exhibition was organized in Kunstmuseum St. Gallen in spring 1953.

== Works ==
- Saint Martin sculpture (1936) at St. Martin Burggen church, St. Gallen
