= Wacław Piotrowski =

Polish painter

- Born: 4 September 1887; Warsaw, Poland
- Died: 2 June 1967 (aged 79); Warsaw, Poland
- Occupation: Painter

Wacław Piotrowski (4 September 1887 – 2 June 1967) was a Polish painter. His work was part of the painting event in the art competition at the 1928 Summer Olympics.
