= Hermann Dieter =

German architect

- Born: 14 September 1879; Darmstadt, Germany
- Occupation: Architect

Hermann Dieter (born 14 September 1879, date of death unknown) was a German architect. His work was part of the architecture event in the art competition at the 1928 Summer Olympics.
