= Wolfgang Schaper =

German sculptor

- Born: 23 January 1895; Berlin, Germany
- Died: 6 August 1930 (aged 35); Berlin, Germany
- Occupation: Sculptor

Wolfgang Schaper (23 January 1895 – 6 August 1930) was a German sculptor. His work was part of the sculpture event in the art competition at the 1928 Summer Olympics.
