= Elisabeth von Esseö =

German sculptor

- Born: 28 June 1883; Jánosháza, Austria-Hungary
- Died: 17 September 1954 (aged 71); Munich, Germany
- Occupation: Sculptor

Elisabeth von Esseö (28 June 1883 – 17 September 1954) was a German sculptor. Her work was part of the sculpture event in the art competition at the 1928 Summer Olympics.
