= Ottorino Aloisio =

Italian architect

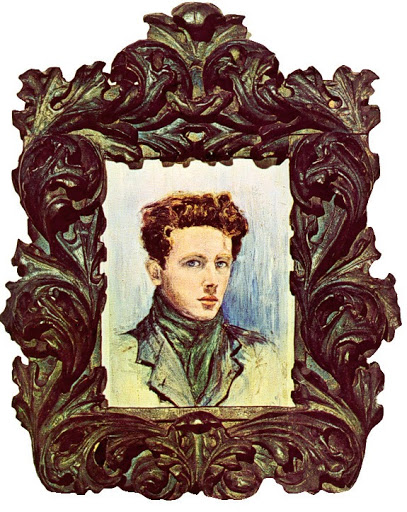
- 1922 self-portrait of Aloisio
- Born: 16 March 1902; Udine, Italy
- Died: 24 January 1986 (aged 83); Turin, Italy
- Occupation: Architect

Ottorino Aloisio (16 March 1902 – 24 January 1986) was an Italian architect. His work was part of the architecture event in the art competition at the 1928 Summer Olympics.

== Biography ==
Ottorino Aloisio was born in Udine on March 16, 1902. The establishment of a new faculty of architecture in Rome persuaded him to move to the capital, where he graduated in 1925.

An active interpreter of the Italian Movement for Rational Architecture (MIAR) alongside G. Levi Montalcini and G. Pagano, he was its main exponent in the Turin area (see the project for Via Roma in Turin, 1931).

During his years in Udine (1926-'29) he devoted himself to projects for competitions, including those for the Terme littorie (1927) and the University of Sport (1928), which signaled his name both in Italy and abroad. He also participated in 1928 in the I Exposition of Rational Architecture in Rome, in the Veneto group, which included Duilio Torres among others. After moving to Turin in 1929, he worked for four years in the office of engineer Arrigo Tedesco-Rocca.

Significant projects include: the “Ideal” cinema theater in Turin (1939), the reconstruction of the “Gianduja” cinema theater in Turin (1946), the Catholic cathedral in Meru, Kenya, and the Sipra-Cetra building in Turin (1959).

His major works are the agency of the Banca cattolica del Veneto in Tarvisio (1947); the Giacomuzzi house on Via Marinoni in Udine (1948-1950); the residential and commercial building on Via Duodo in Udine (1950); Masieri house on Via Treppo in Udine (1950); the refurbishment and extension of the headquarters of the Friulian Electricity Company in Via Uccellis in Udine (1950); the Veritti tomb in the monumental cemetery in Udine (1951); the project for Villa Romanelli in Udine, completed only after his death.

With Carlo Mollino and Marco Federico Roggero, he organized the first national conference on Alpine Architecture in 1952.
