= Edvard Nielsen-Stevns =

Danish writer

- Born: 21 May 1880; Sigerslev, Denmark
- Died: 25 February 1949 (aged 68); Copenhagen, Denmark
- Occupation: Writer

Edvard Nielsen-Stevns (21 May 1880 – 25 February 1949) was a Danish writer. His work was part of the literature event in the art competition at the 1928 Summer Olympics.
