= Otto Hanrath =

Dutch painter

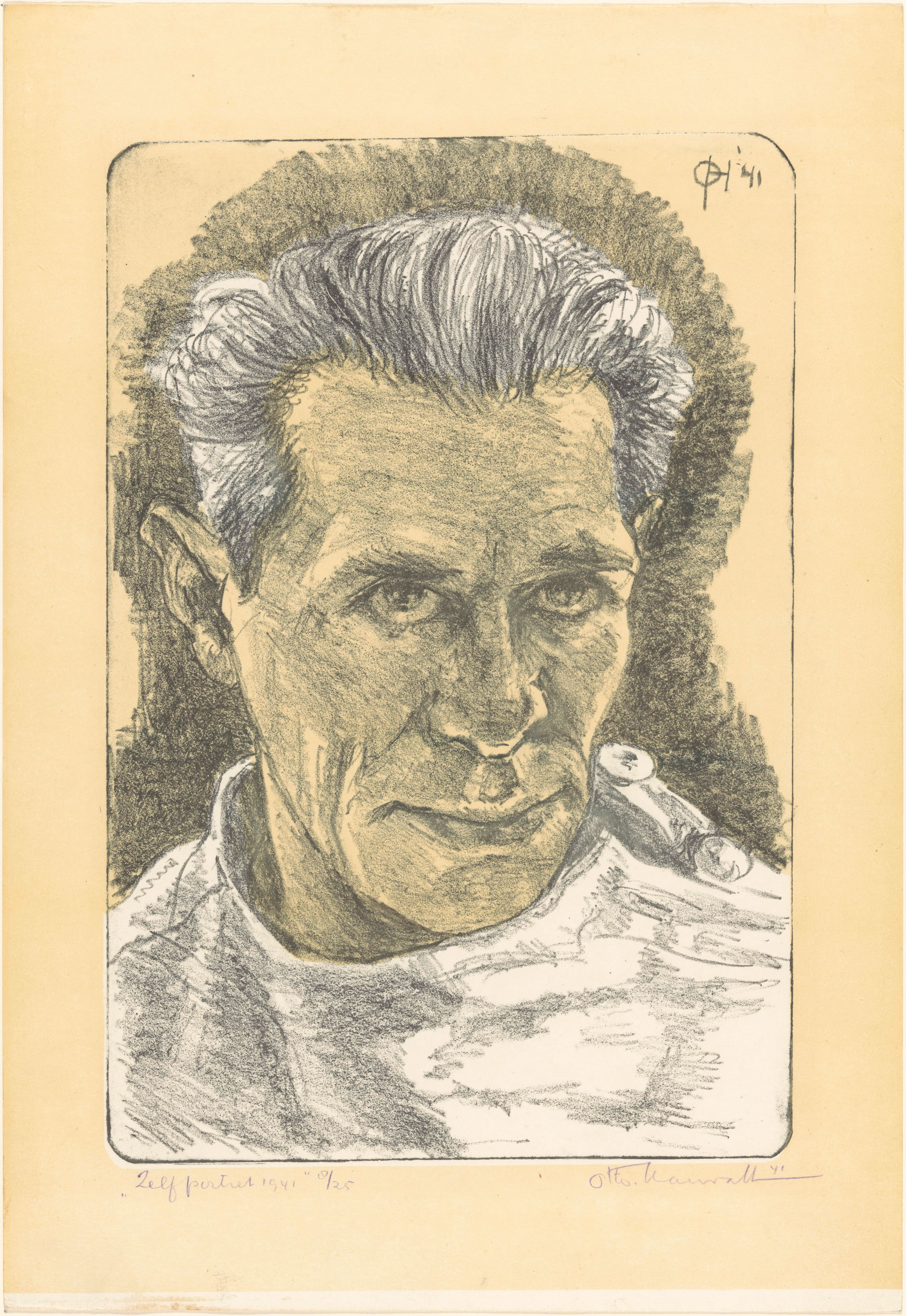
- Born: 8 April 1882; Amsterdam, Netherlands
- Died: 13 September 1944 (aged 62); Groesbeek, Netherlands
- Occupation: Painter

Otto Hanrath (8 April 1882 – 13 September 1944) was a Dutch painter. His work was part of the painting event in the art competition at the 1928 Summer Olympics. Hanrath's work was included in the 1939 exhibition and sale Onze Kunst van Heden (Our Art of Today) at the Rijksmuseum in Amsterdam.
