= Émile Moussat =

French writer (1885–1965)

- Born: 26 June 1885; Algiers, Algeria
- Died: 5 August 1965 (aged 80); Issy-les-Moulineaux, France
- Occupation: Writer

Émile Moussat (26 June 1885 – 5 August 1965) was a French writer. His work was part of the literature event in the art competition at the 1928 Summer Olympics.
