= Pietro Borsari =

Swiss sculptor

- Born: 24 November 1894; Lugano, Switzerland
- Died: 4 December 1959 (aged 65); Lugano, Switzerland
- Occupation: Sculptor

Pietro Borsari (24 November 1894 – 4 December 1959) was a Swiss sculptor. His work was part of the sculpture event in the art competition at the 1928 Summer Olympics.
