= Willia Menzel =

Belgian painter

- Born: 5 February 1907
- Died: 1995 (aged 87–88)
- Occupation: Sculptor

Willia Menzel (5 February 1907 – 1995) was a Belgian artist, primarily a sculptor and graphic designer, associated with the La Cambre group of artists and Cubism. She submitted a work in the Paintings, Drawings and Watercolours section as part of the art competition at the 1928 Summer Olympics.
