= Charles Martin-Sauvaigo =

French painter

- Born: 7 February 1881; Nice, France
- Died: 9 November 1970 (aged 89); Paris, France
- Occupation: Painter

Charles Martin-Sauvaigo (7 February 1881 – 9 November 1970) was a French painter. His work was part of the painting event in the art competition at the 1928 Summer Olympics.
