= Auguste Matisse =

French painter

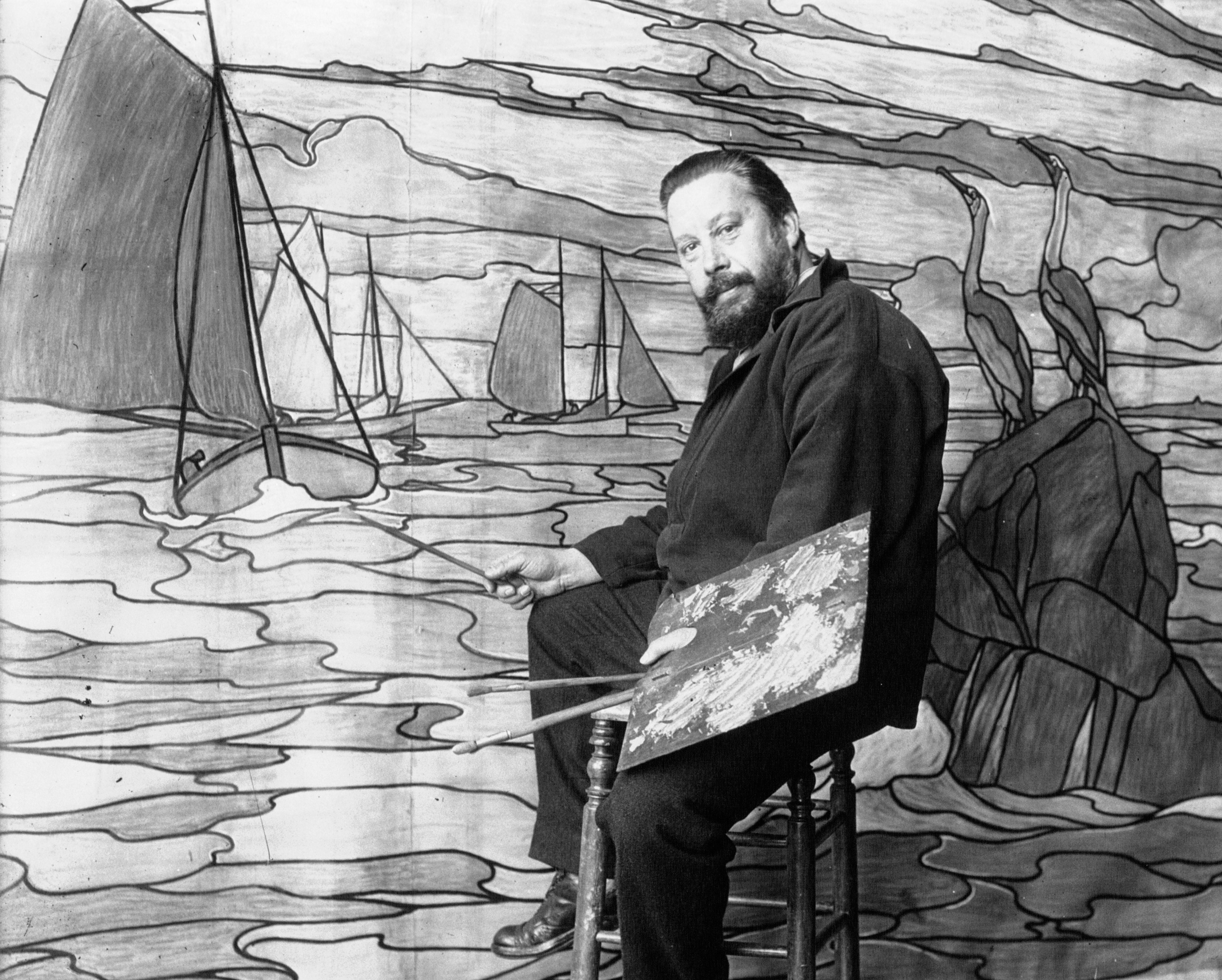
- Auguste Matisse in 1918
- Born: 22 May 1866; Nevers, France
- Died: 19 September 1931 (aged 65); Bréhat, France
- Occupation: Painter

Auguste Matisse (22 May 1866 – 19 September 1931) was a French painter. His work was part of the painting event in the art competition at the 1928 Summer Olympics and at 1924 Winter Olympics in Chamonix.
