= Pierre Souziff =

French architect 1886–1943

- Born: 10 January 1886; Lyon, France
- Died: 12 June 1943 (aged 57); Paris, France
- Occupation: Architect

Pierre Souziff (10 January 1886 – 12 June 1943) was a French architect. His work was part of the architecture event in the art competition at the 1928 Summer Olympics.
