= Pierre de Soete =

Belgian sculptor

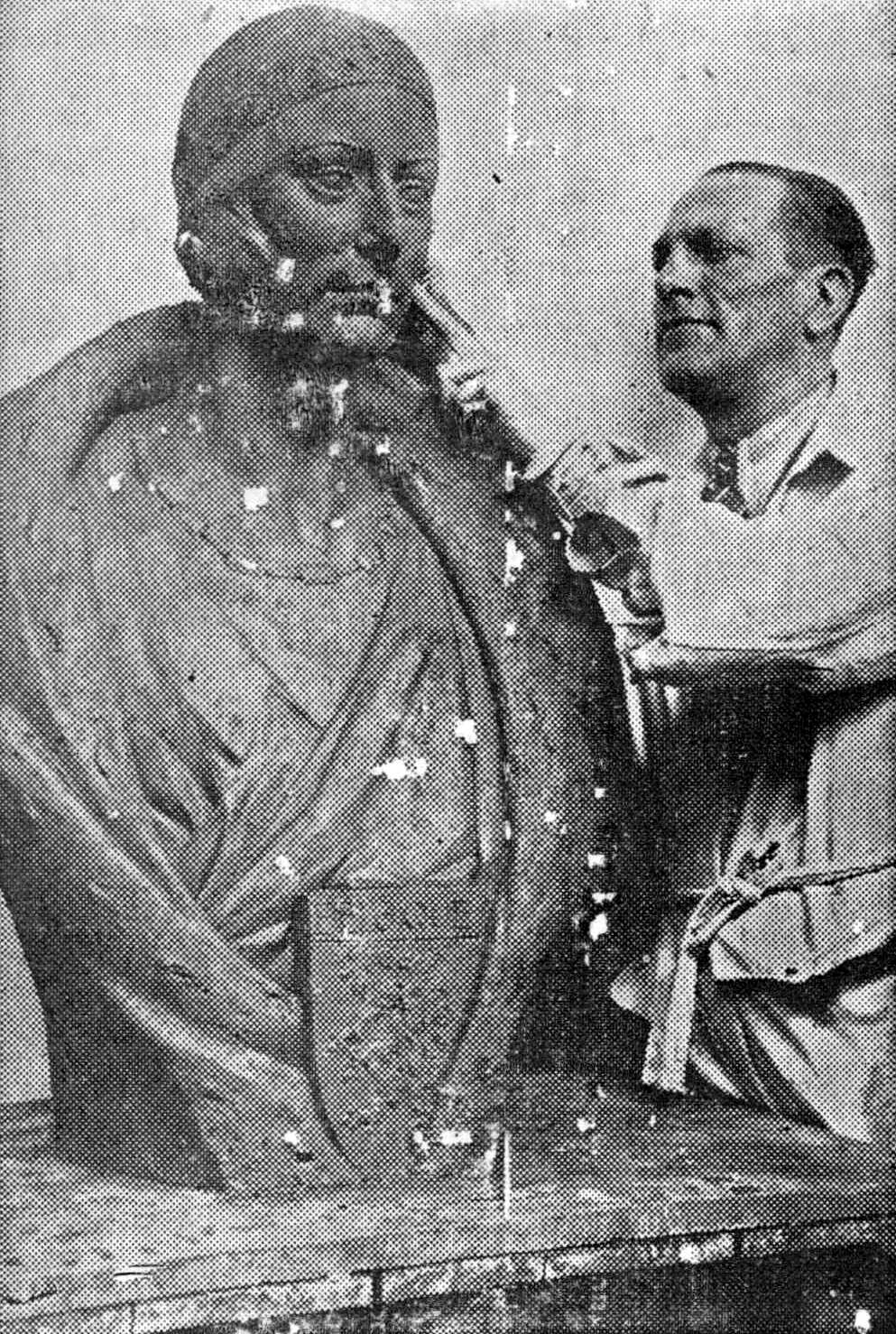
- 1934
- Born: 1886; Molenbeek-Saint-Jean, Belgium
- Died: 16 August 1948 (aged 61–62); Brussels, Belgium
- Occupation: Sculptor

Pierre de Soete (1886 – 16 August 1948) was a Belgian sculptor. His work was part of the sculpture event in the art competition at the 1928 Summer Olympics.
