= Bolesław Surałło =

Polish painter

- Born: 1906; Kherson, Russian Empire
- Died: 9 September 1939 (aged 32–33); Lublin, Poland
- Other name: Bolesław Surałło-Gajduczeni
- Occupation: Painter

Bolesław Surałło (1906 – 9 September 1939) was a Polish painter and graphic designer. His work was part of the painting event in the art competition at the 1928 Summer Olympics.

Surałło was born in 1906 in Kherson. He studied at the Urban School of Decorative Arts and Painting (Miejska Szkoła Sztuk Zdobniczych i Malarstwa) and at the School of Fine Arts (now the Academy of Fine Arts) in Warsaw, and was a student of Edmund Bartłomiejczyk.

Surałło tragically died during the first days of the Second World War. During the Invasion of Poland, he was among the men responsible for transporting Jan Matejko's important painting Battle of Grunwald from Warsaw to Lublin to save it from destruction by the Nazis. After arriving in Lublin, Surałło died in a bombing of the city by the German Luftwaffe.
