= Jacques Jansen (composer) =

Dutch composer

- Born: 3 August 1884; Den Helder, Netherlands
- Died: 29 April 1954 (aged 69); Schagen, Netherlands
- Occupation: Composer

Jacques Jansen (3 August 1884 – 29 April 1954) was a Dutch composer. His work was part of the music event in the art competition at the 1928 Summer Olympics.
