= Henri MacLean =

Dutch painter

- Born: 19 February 1898; Rotterdam, Netherlands
- Died: 21 July 1972 (aged 74); Rotterdam, Netherlands
- Occupation: Painter

Henri MacLean (19 February 1898 – 21 July 1972) was a Dutch painter. His work was part of the painting event in the art competition at the 1928 Summer Olympics. MacLean's work was included in the 1939 exhibition and sale Onze Kunst van Heden (Our Art of Today) at the Rijksmuseum in Amsterdam.
