= Georges Fauvelle =

French architect

- Born: 3 March 1891; Paris, France
- Died: 16 December 1962 (aged 71); Paris, France
- Occupation: Architect

Georges Fauvelle (3 March 1891 – 16 December 1962) was a French architect. His work was part of the architecture event in the art competition at the 1928 Summer Olympics.
