= Otto Schönthal =

Austrian architect

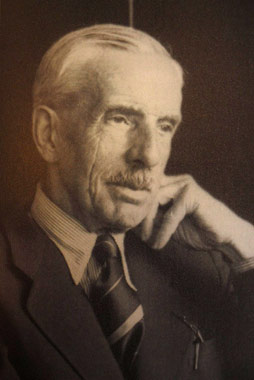
- Born: 10 August 1878; Vienna, Austria
- Died: 31 December 1961 (aged 83); Vienna, Austria
- Occupation: Architect

Otto Schönthal (10 August 1878 – 31 December 1961) was an Austrian architect. His work was part of the architecture event in the art competition at the 1928 Summer Olympics.

== Gallery ==
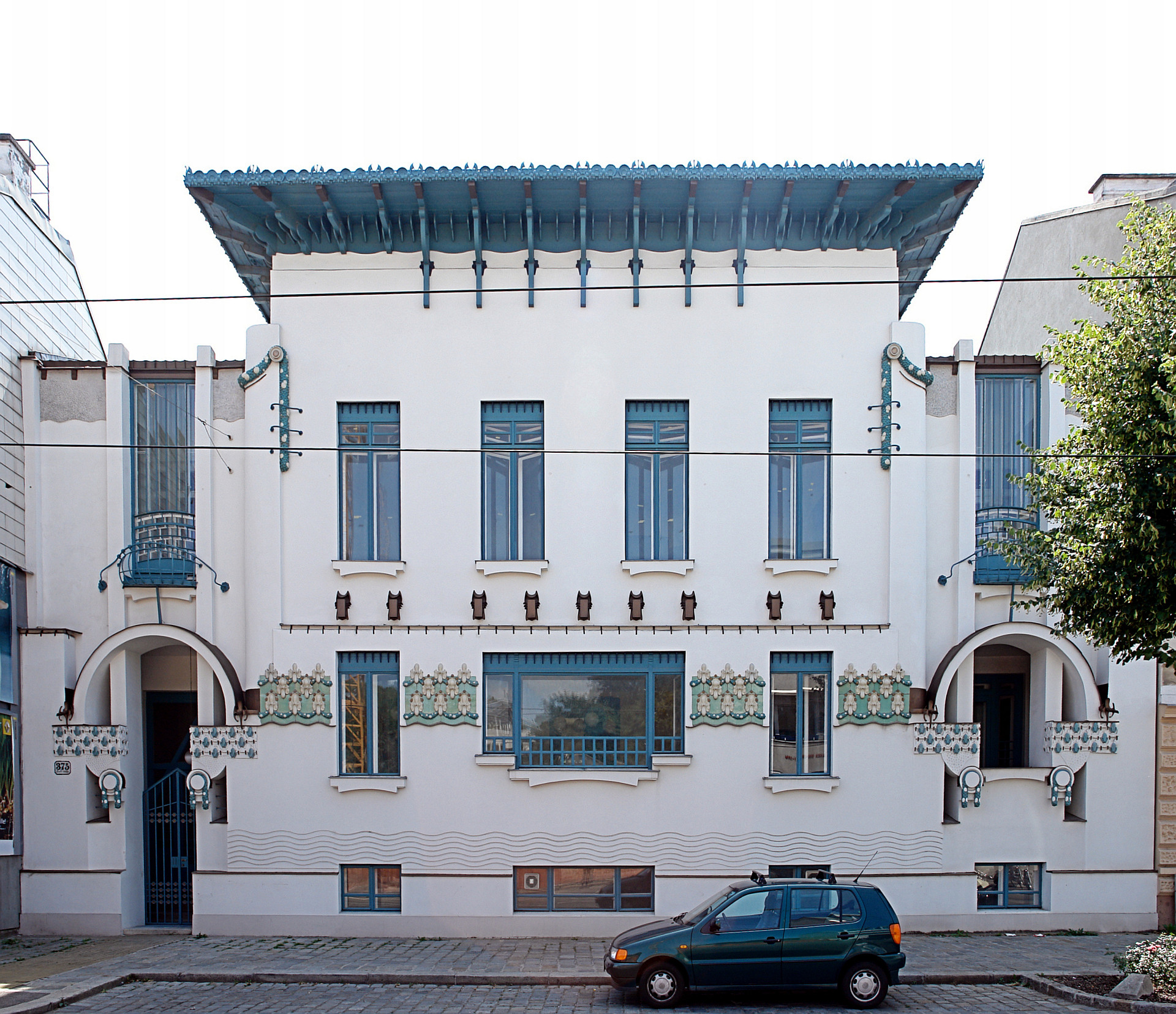
Villa Vojcsik, Vienna (1900-1901)
