= Edward Koster =

Dutch writer

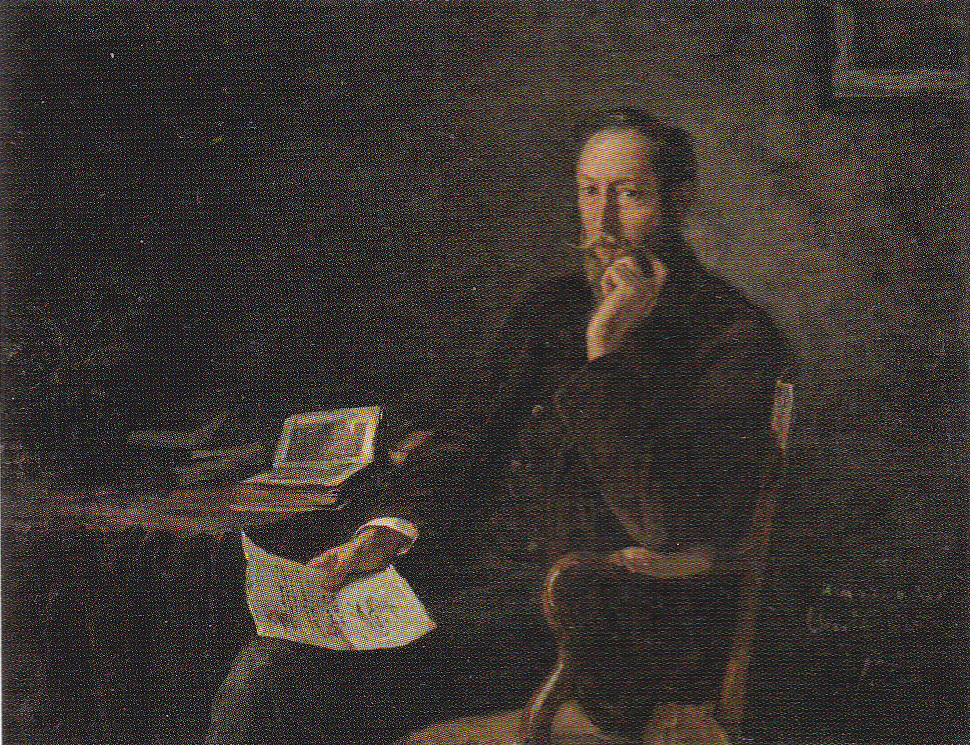
- Born: 14 September 1861; London, England
- Died: 3 July 1937 (aged 75); The Hague, Netherlands
- Occupation: Writer

Edward Koster (14 September 1861 – 3 July 1937) was a Dutch writer. His work was part of the literature event art competition at the 1928 Summer Olympics.
