= Léopold Bévière =

French architect (1864–1935)

- Born: 4 February 1864; Fourmies, France
- Died: 6 September 1935 (aged 71)
- Occupation: Architect

Léopold Bévière (4 February 1864 – 6 September 1935) was a French architect. His work was part of the architecture event in the art competition at the 1928 Summer Olympics.
