= Paul Paeschke =

German painter

- Born: 27 February 1875; Berlin, Germany
- Died: 10 June 1943 (aged 68); Berlin, Germany
- Occupation: Painter

Paul Paeschke (27 February 1875 – 10 June 1943) was a German painter. His work was part of the painting event in the art competition at the 1928 Summer Olympics.
