= Leon Dołżycki =

Polish painter

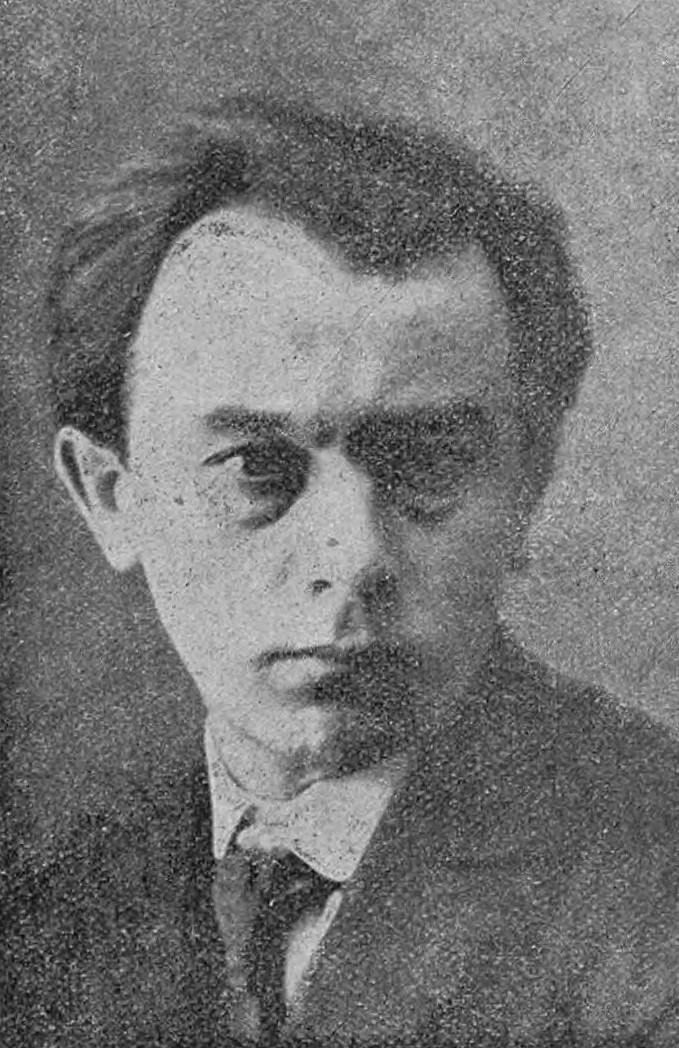
- Born: 20 March 1888; Lemberg, Austro-Hungarian Empire
- Died: 20 September 1965 (aged 77); Kraków, Poland
- Occupation: Painter

Leon Dołżycki (20 March 1888 – 20 September 1965) was a Polish painter. His work was part of the painting event in the art competition at the 1928 Summer Olympics.
