= Gaston Gélibert =

French painter

- Born: 1850; Médouy, France
- Died: 1931 (aged 80–81); Châtillon-sous-Bagneux, France
- Occupation: Painter

Gaston Gélibert (1850 – 1931) was a French painter. His work was part of the painting event in the art competition at the 1928 Summer Olympics.
