= Albert Mulder =

Dutch painter

- Born: 15 July 1889; Maastricht, Netherlands
- Died: 7 November 1987 (aged 98); Laren, Netherlands
- Occupation: Painter

Albert Mulder (15 July 1889 – 7 November 1987) was a Dutch painter. His work was part of the painting event in the art competition at the 1928 Summer Olympics. Mulder's work was included in the 1939 exhibition and sale Onze Kunst van Heden (Our Art of Today) at the Rijksmuseum in Amsterdam.
