= Wanda Pleszczyńska =

Polish painter (1903–1943)

- Born: 20 May 1903; Lublin, Poland
- Died: 17 December 1943 (aged 40); Warsaw, Poland
- Occupation: Painter

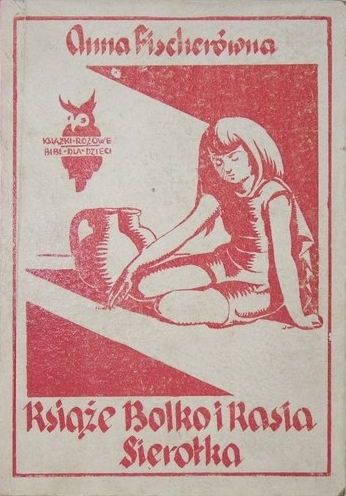
cover of the book Anna Fischerówna Prince Bolko and Kasia Sierotka, author Wanda Pleszczyńska.

Wanda Pleszczyńska (20 May 1903 – 17 December 1943) was a Polish painter. Her work was part of the painting event in the art competition at the 1928 Summer Olympics. She was killed in Pawiak prison by the Germans in World War II, after becoming a member of the Polish resistance.
