= Maurice Pellerier =

French painter

- Born: 22 February 1875; Paris, France
- Died: 14 January 1962 (aged 86); Paris, France
- Occupation: Painter

Maurice Pellerier (22 February 1875 – 14 January 1962) was a French painter. His work was part of the painting event in the art competition at the 1928 Summer Olympics.
