= Gerhart Drabsch =

German writer

- Born: 11 September 1902; Potsdam, Germany
- Died: 9 April 1945 (aged 42); Moldenhütte, Germany
- Occupation: Writer

Gerhart Drabsch (11 September 1902 – 9 April 1945) was a German writer. His work was part of the literature event in the art competition at the 1928 Summer Olympics.

== Personal life ==
Drabsch served in the Waffen-SS during the final days of the Second World War and was killed in action on 9 April 1945. He was originally listed as missing in action, but his remains were later found and interred at Luckenwalde war cemetery.

== See also ==
- List of solved missing person cases
