= Adriaan van 't Hoff =

Dutch painter

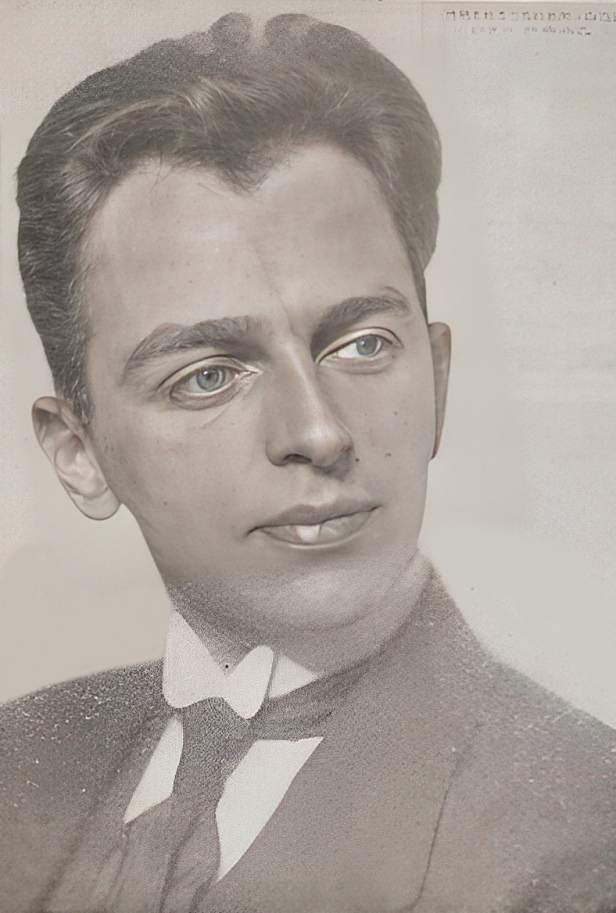
- Born: 7 December 1893; The Hague, Netherlands
- Died: 15 November 1939 (aged 45); Wassenaar, Netherlands
- Occupation: Painter

Adriaan van 't Hoff (7 December 1893 – 15 November 1939) was a Dutch painter. His work was part of the painting event in the art competition at the 1928 Summer Olympics.
