= Engelina Hameetman-Schlette =

Dutch painter

- Born: 20 August 1875; The Hague, Netherlands
- Died: 27 September 1954 (aged 79); The Hague, Netherlands
- Occupation: Painter

Engelina Hameetman-Schlette (20 August 1875 – 27 September 1954) was a Dutch painter. Her work was part of the painting event in the art competition at the 1928 Summer Olympics.
