= Joseph Dierickx =

Belgian painter

- Born: 14 October 1865; Brussels, Belgium
- Died: 28 October 1959 (aged 94); Brussels, Belgium
- Occupation: Painter

Joseph Dierickx (14 October 1865 – 28 October 1959) was a Belgian painter. His work was part of the painting event in the art competition at the 1928 Summer Olympics.
