= Ruth Ball =

American sculptor

Ruth Norton Ball (December 12, 1879 – December 12, 1960) (born Ruth Norton Ball) was a sculptor and a competitor in art competitions at the 1928 Summer Olympics.

== Biography ==
Ball was born to Charles and Ida Ball on December 12, 1879, in Madison, Wisconsin. She went on to become the Curator of Indian Arts at the San Diego Museum of Art. She taught stone sculpture at the San Diego Art Institute. Ball died in El Cajon, California on her birthday in 1960.
