= Ludwik Oli =

Polish architect

- Born: 17 December 1898; Łódź, Poland
- Died: 1943 (aged 44–45); Lviv, Ukraine
- Occupation: Architect

Ludwik Oli (17 December 1898 – 1943) was a Polish architect. He graduated from the Ecole Speciale d'Architecture in Paris. He was a member of SARP. His work was part of the architecture event in the art competition at the 1928 Summer Olympics.

He lived in Łódź where he had his office. In 1943 during German occupation he was shot and killed in Lwów.
