= Arthur Steiner =

Austrian writer (1896–1984)

- Born: 31 March 1896; Vienna, Austria
- Died: 27 January 1984 (aged 87); Munich, Germany
- Occupation: Writer

Arthur Steiner (31 March 1896 – 27 January 1984) was an Austrian writer and sports journalist. His work was part of the literature event in the art competition at the 1928 Summer Olympics. He was the first editor of the German language sports magazine Sportblatt am Mittag. From 1915-1938 he was sports editor for Kronen Zeitung. With the rise of Nazi Germany, he was forced to leave this post because he was Jewish. He immigrated to the United States; traveling first through Switzerland and the United Kingdom on his way to America.
