= Roderic O'Connor (painter) =

American painter

- Born: October 29, 1907; Clamart, France
- Died: March 6, 2001 (aged 93); Palm Beach, Florida, United States
- Occupation: Painter

Roderic O'Connor (October 29, 1907 – March 6, 2001) was an American painter. His work was part of the painting event in the art competition at the 1928 Summer Olympics.
