= Aleksander Kłopotowski =

Polish painter

- Born: Aleksander Lech Kłopotowski; 10 December 1895; Warsaw, Poland
- Died: 6 December 1944 (aged 49); Mülsen St. Micheln Subcamp, Flossenbürg Concentration Camp, Germany
- Occupation: Painter

Aleksander Kłopotowski (born 10 December 1895 – 6 December 1944) was a Polish painter. His work was part of the painting event in the art competition at the 1928 Summer Olympics.

Kłopotowski died in a concentration camp on 6 December 1944, at the age of 49.
