= Ottmar Obermaier =

German sculptor

- Born: 17 November 1883; Inzell, Germany
- Died: 30 January 1958 (aged 74); Munich, Germany
- Occupation: Sculptor

Ottmar Obermaier (17 November 1883 – 30 January 1958) was a German sculptor. His work was part of the sculpture event in the art competition at the 1928 Summer Olympics.
