= Ole Sverre =

Norwegian architect (1865–1952)

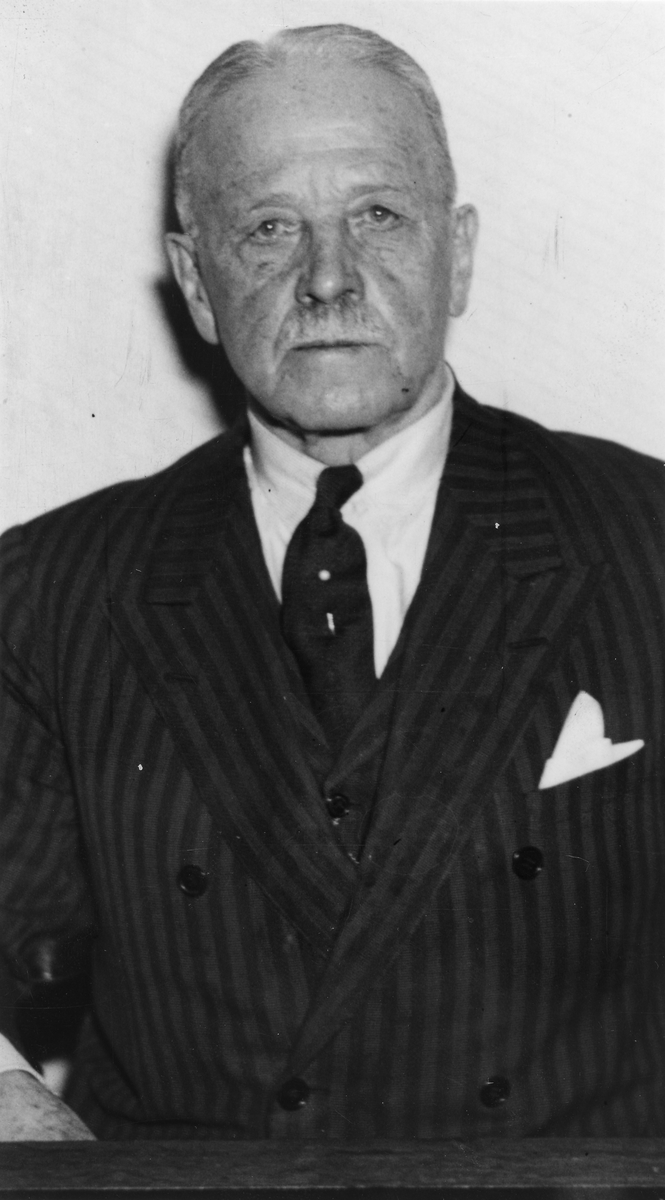
- Ole Sverre in 1940
- Born: 7 June 1865; Fredrikstad, Norway
- Died: 31 January 1952 (aged 86); Oslo, Norway
- Occupation: Architect

Ole Sverre (7 June 1865 – 31 January 1952) was a Norwegian architect. His work was part of the architecture event in the art competition at the 1928 Summer Olympics.
