= Gilbert Privat =

French sculptor

- Born: 27 May 1892; Toulouse, France
- Died: 3 August 1969 (aged 77); Soulac-sur-Mer, France
- Occupation: Sculptor

Gilbert Privat (27 May 1892 – 3 August 1969) was a French sculptor. His work was part of the sculpture event in the art competition at the 1928 Summer Olympics.
