= Louis d'Ambrosio =

French sculptor

- Born: 21 June 1879; Picinisco, Italy
- Died: 1946 (aged 66–67); Paris, France
- Occupation: Sculptor

Louis d'Ambrosio (21 June 1879 – 1946) was a French sculptor. His work was part of the sculpture event in the art competition at the 1928 Summer Olympics.
