= Ferruccio Pasqui =

Italian painter

- Born: 5 February 1886; Rapolano Terme, Italy
- Died: 23 November 1958 (aged 72); Firenze, Italy
- Occupation: Painter

Ferruccio Pasqui (5 February 1886 – 23 November 1958) was an Italian painter. His work was part of the painting event in the art competition at the 1928 Summer Olympics.
