= David Schulman =

Dutch painter

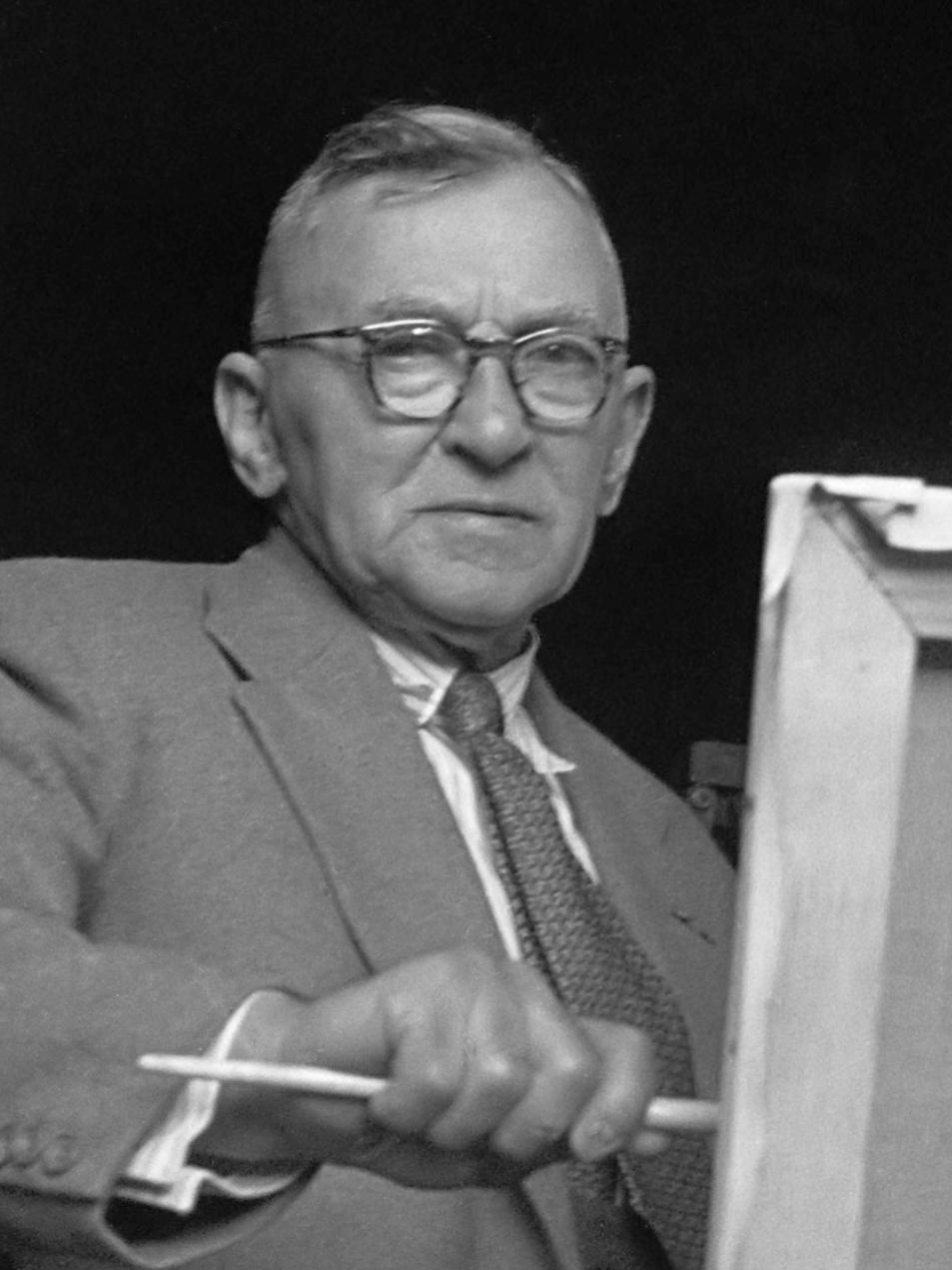
- Schulman in 1956
- Born: 31 October 1881; Hilversum, Netherlands
- Died: 21 October 1966 (aged 84); Laren, Netherlands

David Schulman (31 October 1881 – 21 October 1966) was a Dutch painter. His work was part of the painting event in the art competition at the 1928 Summer Olympics. Schulman's work was included in the 1939 exhibition and sale Onze Kunst van Heden (Our Art of Today) at the Rijksmuseum in Amsterdam.
