= Daniel Octobre =

French painter

- Born: 10 December 1903; Paris, France
- Died: 19 April 1995 (aged 91); Paris, France
- Occupation: Painter

Daniel Octobre (10 December 1903 – 19 April 1995) was a French painter. His work was part of the painting event in the art competition at the 1928 Summer Olympics.
