= Geert Grauss =

Dutch painter

- Born: 9 July 1882; Middelburg, Netherlands
- Died: 1 October 1929 (aged 47); The Hague, Netherlands
- Occupation: Painter

Geert Grauss (9 July 1882 – 1 October 1929) was a Dutch painter. His work was part of the painting event in the art competition at the 1928 Summer Olympics.
