= Paul Marozeau =

French architect

- Born: 17 June 1879; Husseren-Wesserling, France
- Died: 21 February 1942 (aged 62); Vosges, France
- Occupation: Architect

Paul Marozeau (17 June 1879 – 21 February 1942) was a French architect. His work was part of the architecture event in the art competition at the 1928 Summer Olympics.
