= Gerrit van Duffelen =

Dutch painter

- Born: 21 September 1889; Rotterdam, Netherlands
- Died: 5 April 1967 (aged 77); Bloemendaal, Netherlands
- Occupation: Painter

Gerrit van Duffelen (21 September 1889 – 5 April 1967) was a Dutch painter. His work was part of the painting event in the art competition at the 1928 Summer Olympics. His work was included in the 1939 exhibition and sale Onze Kunst van Heden (Our Art of Today) at the Rijksmuseum in Amsterdam.
