= Eugène Molineau =

French sculptor

- Born: 1883; Tours, France
- Died: 1949 (aged 65–66)
- Occupation: Sculptor

Eugène Molineau (1883–1949) was a French sculptor. His work was part of the sculpture event in the art competition at the 1928 Summer Olympics.
