= Constantin Krage =

Danish architect

- Born: 10 June 1900; Skjold, Denmark
- Died: 4 January 1984 (aged 83); Copenhagen, Denmark
- Occupation: Architect

Constantin Krage (10 June 1900 – 4 January 1984) was a Danish architect. His work was part of the architecture event in the art competition at the 1928 Summer Olympics.
