= Piet van den Bergh =

Dutch painter

- Born: 30 November 1865; The Hague, Netherlands
- Died: 29 April 1950 (aged 84); The Hague, Netherlands
- Occupation: Painter

Piet van den Bergh (30 November 1865 – 29 April 1950) was a Dutch painter. His work was part of the painting event in the art competition at the 1928 Summer Olympics.
