= Jan Kriege =

Dutch sculptor (1884–1944)

- Born: 15 May 1884; Woerden, Netherlands
- Died: 3 August 1944 (aged 60); Woerden, Netherlands
- Occupation: Sculptor

Jan Kriege (15 May 1884 – 3 August 1944) was a Dutch sculptor. His work was part of the sculpture event in the art competition at the 1928 Summer Olympics.
