= Chris Huidekooper =

Dutch painter

- Born: 2 June 1878; Groningen, Netherlands
- Died: 14 November 1939 (aged 61); Rabat, Morocco
- Occupation: Painter

Chris Huidekooper (2 June 1878 – 14 November 1939) was a Dutch painter. His work was part of the painting event in the art competition at the 1928 Summer Olympics.
