= Anton Versluijs =

Dutch painter

- Born: 7 March 1893; Rotterdam, Netherlands
- Died: 14 October 1982 (aged 89); Rotterdam, Netherlands
- Occupation: Painter

Anton Versluijs (7 March 1893 – 14 October 1982) was a Dutch painter. His work was part of the painting event in the art competition at the 1928 Summer Olympics.
