= Charles Kiffer-Porte =

French painter

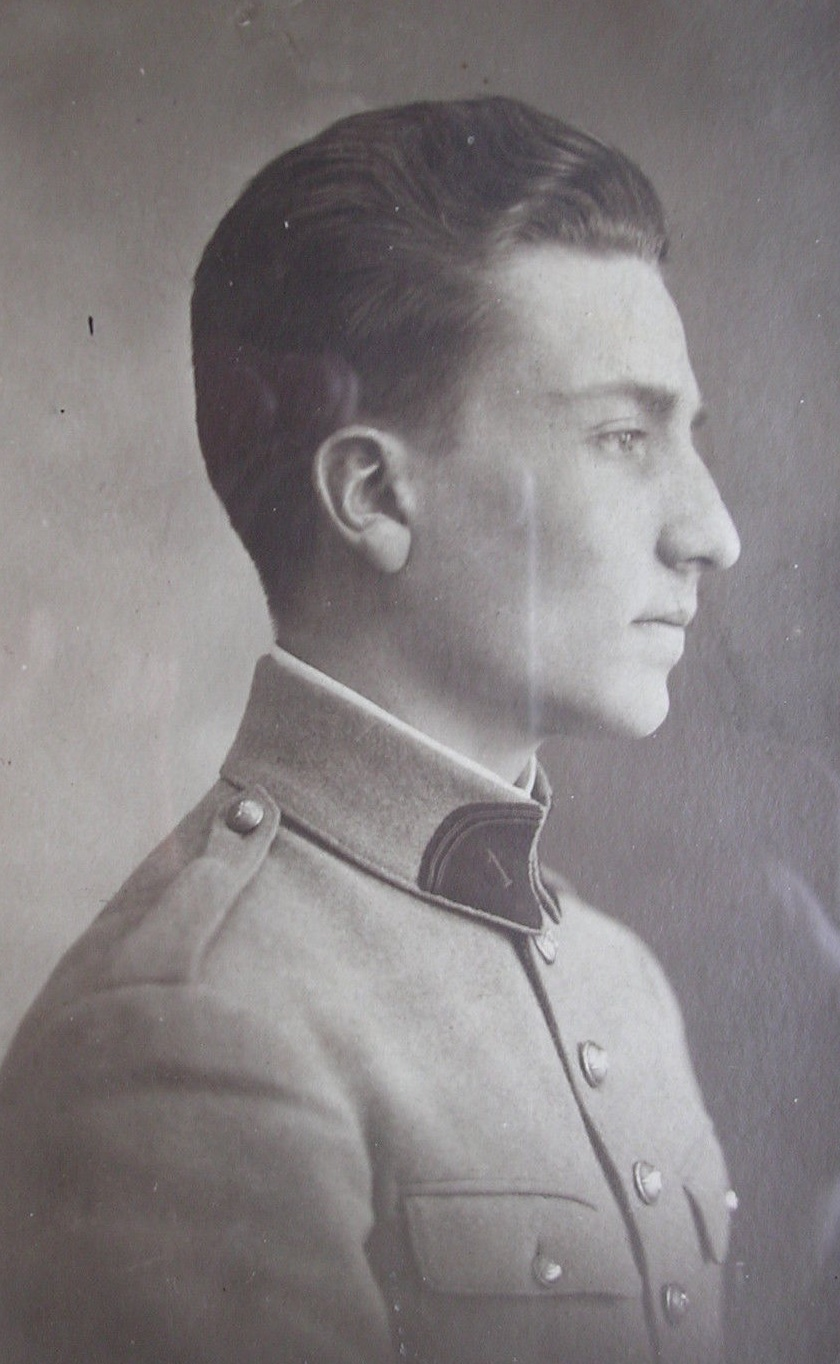
- Born: 8 June 1902; Paris, France
- Died: 20 January 1992 (aged 89); Paris, France
- Occupation: Painter

Charles Kiffer-Porte (8 June 1902 – 20 January 1992) was a French painter. His work was part of the painting event in the art competition at the 1928 Summer Olympics.
