= Jean Raoul Chaurand-Naurac =

French painter

- Born: 28 February 1878; Lyon, France
- Died: 3 October 1948 (aged 70); Paris, France
- Occupation: Painter

Jean Raoul Chaurand-Naurac (28 February 1878 – 3 October 1948) was a French painter. His work was part of the painting event in the art competition at the 1928 Summer Olympics.

He was a friend of Henri Matisse, who he had met in 1897 through Gustave Moreau. Matisse drew several portraits of Chauraund-Naurac's daughter Janine in 1916.
