= Leon Sarteel =

Belgian sculptor

- Born: 2 October 1882; Ghent, Belgium
- Died: 2 May 1942 (aged 59); Ghent, Belgium
- Occupation: Sculptor

Leon Sarteel (2 October 1882 – 2 May 1942) was a Belgian sculptor. His work was part of the sculpture event in the art competition at the 1928 Summer Olympics.
