= Emil Pohle =

German architect

- Born: 27 August 1885; Hedersleben, Germany
- Died: 30 March 1962 (aged 76); Kassel, Germany
- Occupation: Architect

Emil Pohle (27 August 1885 – 30 March 1962) was a German architect. His work was part of the architecture event in the art competition at the 1928 Summer Olympics.
