= Albert Fernand-Renault =

French painter (1887–1963)

- Born: 16 June 1887; Paris, France
- Died: 26 November 1963 (aged 76); Paris, France
- Occupation: Painter

Albert Fernand-Renault (1887 – 1963) was a French painter. His work was part of the painting event in the art competition at the 1928 Summer Olympics.
