= August Peisker =

Swiss sculptor

- Born: 1877; Vernéřovice, Austria-Hungary
- Died: February 1962 (aged 84–85)
- Occupation: Sculptor

August Peisker (1877 – February 1962) was a Swiss sculptor. His work was part of the sculpture event in the art competition at the 1928 Summer Olympics.
