= Artur Brusenbauch =

Austrian painter

- Born: 24 November 1881; Pozsony, Austria-Hungary
- Died: 18 January 1957 (aged 75); Abtsdorf am Attersee, Austria
- Occupation: Painter

Artur Brusenbauch (24 November 1881 – 18 January 1957) was an Austrian painter. His work was part of the painting event in the art competition at the 1928 Summer Olympics.
