= Oscar Prati =

Italian architect (1898–1971)

- Born: 1898
- Died: 1971 (aged 72–73)
- Occupation: Architect

Oscar Prati (1898 – 1971) was an Italian architect. His work was part of the architecture event in the art competition at the 1928 Summer Olympics.
