= Suzanne de Sainte-Croix =

French sculptor

- Born: Jeanne Antoinette Zoe Beljambe; 9 June 1867; Collonges-au-Mont-d'Or, France
- Died: 28 September 1953; Paris, France
- Occupation: Sculptor

Suzanne de Sainte-Croix (born 9 June 1867, dead 28 september 1953) was a French sculptor. Her work was part of the sculpture event in the art competition at the 1928 Summer Olympics.
