= Otto Linne =

German architect

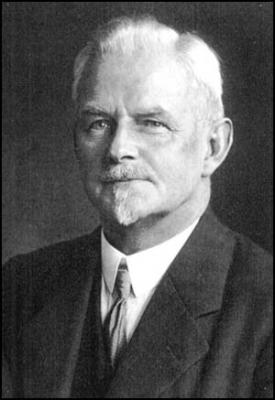
- Born: 2 December 1869; Bremen, Germany
- Died: 4 June 1937 (aged 67); Hamburg, Germany
- Occupation: Architect

Otto Linne (2 December 1869 – 4 June 1937) was a German architect. His work was part of the architecture event in the art competition at the 1928 Summer Olympics.
