= Jean Barrez =

French painter

Joe Bridge
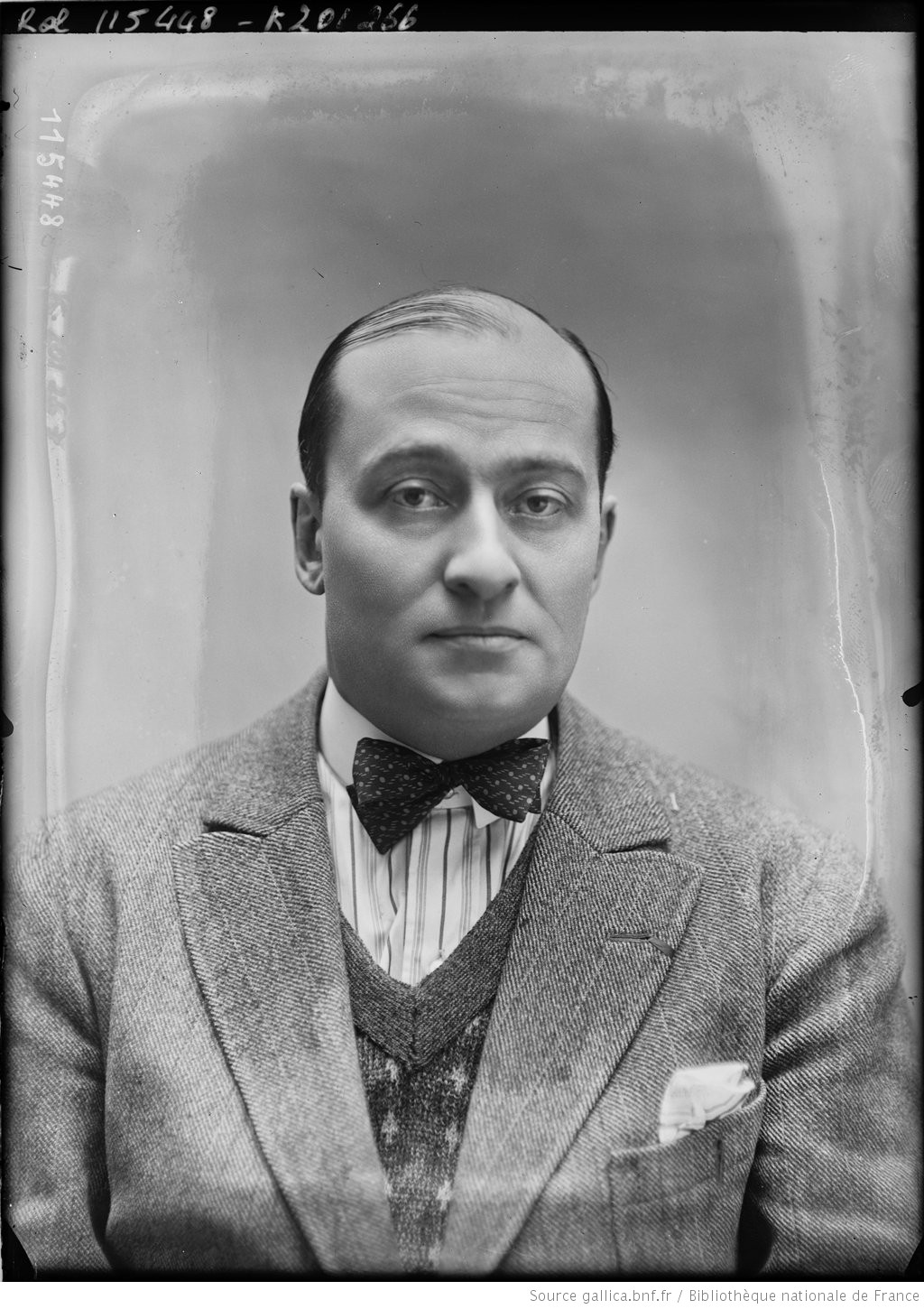
- Born: 14 March 1886; New York, New York, United States
- Died: 10 April 1967 (aged 81); Paris, France
- Occupation: Painter

Jean Barrez (14 March 1886 – 10 April 1967) was a French painter. His work was part of the painting event in the art competition at the 1928 Summer Olympics under the pseudonym Joe Bridge.
