= Lucienne Pageot-Rousseaux =

French painter

- Born: 6 April 1899; Paris, France
- Died: 28 May 1994 (aged 95); Saint-Paul-de-Vence, France
- Occupation: Painter

Lucienne Pageot-Rousseaux (French: [lysjɛn paʒo ʁuso]; 6 April 1899 – 28 May 1994) was a French painter, specialising in subjects from the ballet and dance. Her work was part of the painting event in the art competition at the 1928 Summer Olympics.
