= Balduin Schilling =

German architect

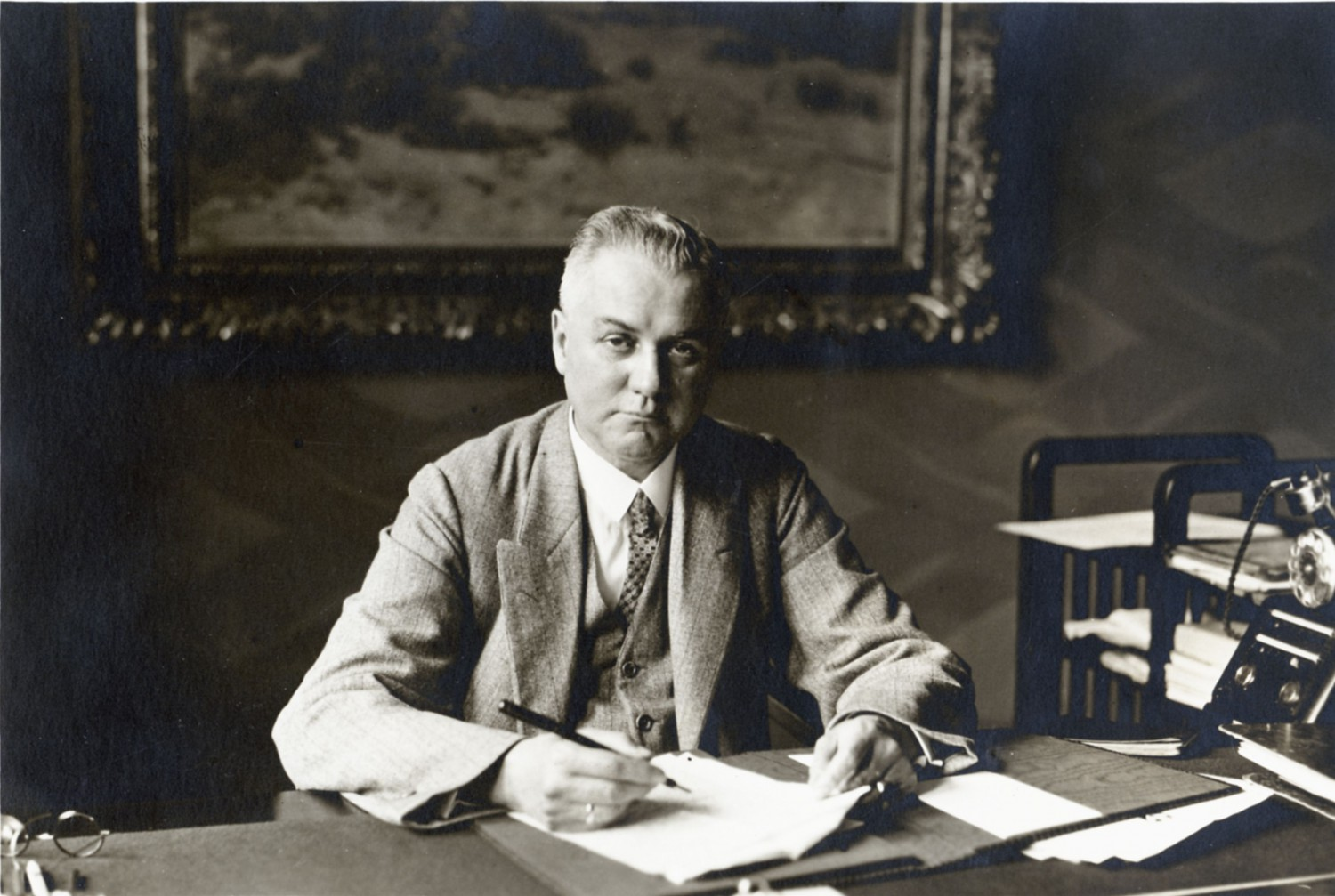
- Born: 11 March 1868; Elberfeld, Germany
- Died: 15 December 1929 (aged 61); Dorsten, Germany
- Occupation: Architect

Balduin Schilling (11 March 1868 – 15 December 1929) was a German architect. His work was part of the architecture event in the art competition at the 1928 Summer Olympics.
