= Maurice Ménardeau =

French painter

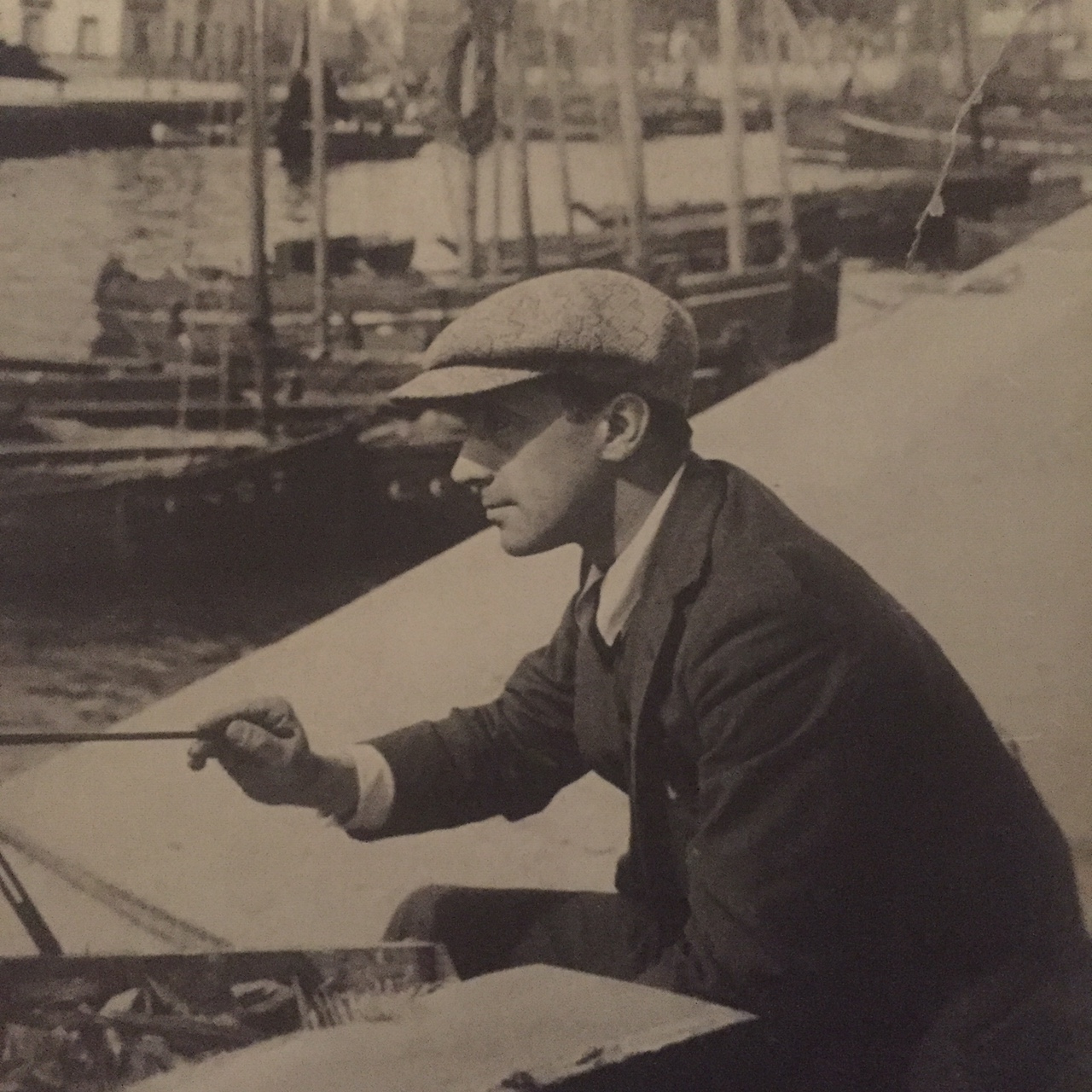
- Born: 6 February 1897; Limoges, France
- Died: 11 April 1977 (aged 80); Curepipe, Mauritius
- Occupation: Painter

Maurice Ménardeau (6 February 1897 – 11 April 1977) was a French painter. His work was part of the painting event in the art competition at the 1928 Summer Olympics.
