= Rémy Landeau =

French painter

- Born: 8 October 1859; Sèvres, France
- Died: 1934 (aged 74–75)
- Occupation: Painter

Rémy Landeau (8 October 1859 – 1934) was a French painter. His work was part of the painting event in the art competition at the 1928 Summer Olympics.
