= Alfred Schuermans =

Belgian painter

- Born: 1897; Antwerp, Belgium
- Occupation: Painter

Alfred Schuermans (born 1897, date of death 1978) was a Belgian painter. His work was part of the painting event in the art competition at the 1928 Summer Olympics.
