= Peter Schmitz (composer) =

German composer

- Born: 20 January 1895; Cologne, Germany
- Died: 11 July 1964 (aged 69); Cologne, Germany
- Occupation: Composer

Peter Schmitz (20 January 1895 – 11 July 1964) was a German composer. His work was part of the music event in the art competition at the 1928 Summer Olympics.
