= Reginald Higgins =

British painter

- Born: 31 March 1877; Paddington, England
- Died: 11 February 1933 (aged 55); Kilburn, England
- Occupation: Painter

Reginald Higgins (31 March 1877 – 11 February 1933) was a British painter. His work was part of the painting event in the art competition at the 1928 Summer Olympics.
