= Cecil King (British painter) =

British painter

- Born: 6 August 1881; Hounslow, England
- Died: 9 December 1942 (aged 61); Hampstead, England
- Occupation: Painter

Cecil King (6 August 1881 – 9 December 1942) was a British painter. His work was part of the painting event in the art competition at the 1928 Summer Olympics.
