= Fred Voelckerling =

German sculptor

- Born: 21 August 1872; Berlin, Germany
- Died: 27 January 1945 (aged 72); Dresden, Germany
- Occupation: Sculptor

Fred Voelckerling (21 August 1872 – 27 January 1945) was a German sculptor. His work was part of the sculpture event in the art competition at the 1928 Summer Olympics.
