= Roger Moret (composer) =

Swiss composer

- Born: 25 September 1901; Lausanne, Switzerland
- Died: 25 November 1972 (aged 71); Lausanne, Switzerland
- Occupation: Composer

Roger Moret (25 September 1901 – 25 November 1972) was a Swiss composer. His work was part of the music event in the art competition at the 1928 Summer Olympics.
