= Ludwig Graf (painter) =

Austrian painter

- Born: 29 December 1868; Vienna, Austria-Hungary
- Died: 17 November 1932 (aged 63); Vienna, Austria
- Occupation: Painter

Ludwig Graf (29 December 1868 – 17 November 1932) was an Austrian painter. His work was part of the painting event in the art competition at the 1928 Summer Olympics.
