= Gustave Salgé =

French painter

- Born: 29 July 1878; Marseille, France
- Died: 30 August 1946 (aged 68); Jouques, France
- Occupation: Painter

Gustave Salgé (29 July 1878 – 30 August 1946) was a French painter. His work was part of the painting event in the art competition at the 1928 Summer Olympics.
