= Maria Dunin =

Polish painter

- Born: 5 May 1899; Kamianets-Podilskyi, Ukraine
- Died: 6 August 1986 (aged 87); Warsaw, Poland
- Occupation: Painter

Maria Dunin (5 May 1899 – 6 August 1986) was a Polish painter. Her work was part of the painting event in the art competition at the 1928 Summer Olympics.
