= Henriëtte Vaillant =

Dutch sculptor

- Born: 10 December 1875; Utrecht, Netherlands
- Died: 13 December 1949 (aged 74); The Hague, Netherlands
- Occupation: Sculptor

Henriëtte Vaillant (10 December 1875 – 13 December 1949) was a Dutch sculptor. Her work was part of the sculpture event in the art competition at the 1928 Summer Olympics.
