= Dezső Király =

Hungarian writer

- Born: 5 February 1896; Budapest, Austria-Hungary
- Died: 11 June 1966 (aged 70); Budapest, Hungary
- Occupation: Writer

Dezső Király (5 February 1896 – 11 June 1966) was a Hungarian writer. His work was part of the literature event in the art competition at the 1928 Summer Olympics.
