= Emil Hoppe =

Austrian architect

- Born: 2 April 1876; Vienna, Austria
- Died: 14 August 1957 (aged 81); Vienna, Austria
- Occupation: Architect

Emil Hoppe (2 April 1876 – 14 August 1957) was an Austrian architect. His work was part of the architecture event in the art competition at the 1928 Summer Olympics.
