= Eugen Weisz =

American painter (1886–1954)

- Born: January 3, 1886; Šurany, Austria-Hungary
- Died: January 3, 1954 (aged 68); Tucson, Arizona, United States
- Occupation: Painter

Eugen Weisz (January 3, 1886 – January 3, 1954) was an American painter. His work was part of the painting event in the art competition at the 1928 Summer Olympics.
