= Wolf Röhricht =

German painter

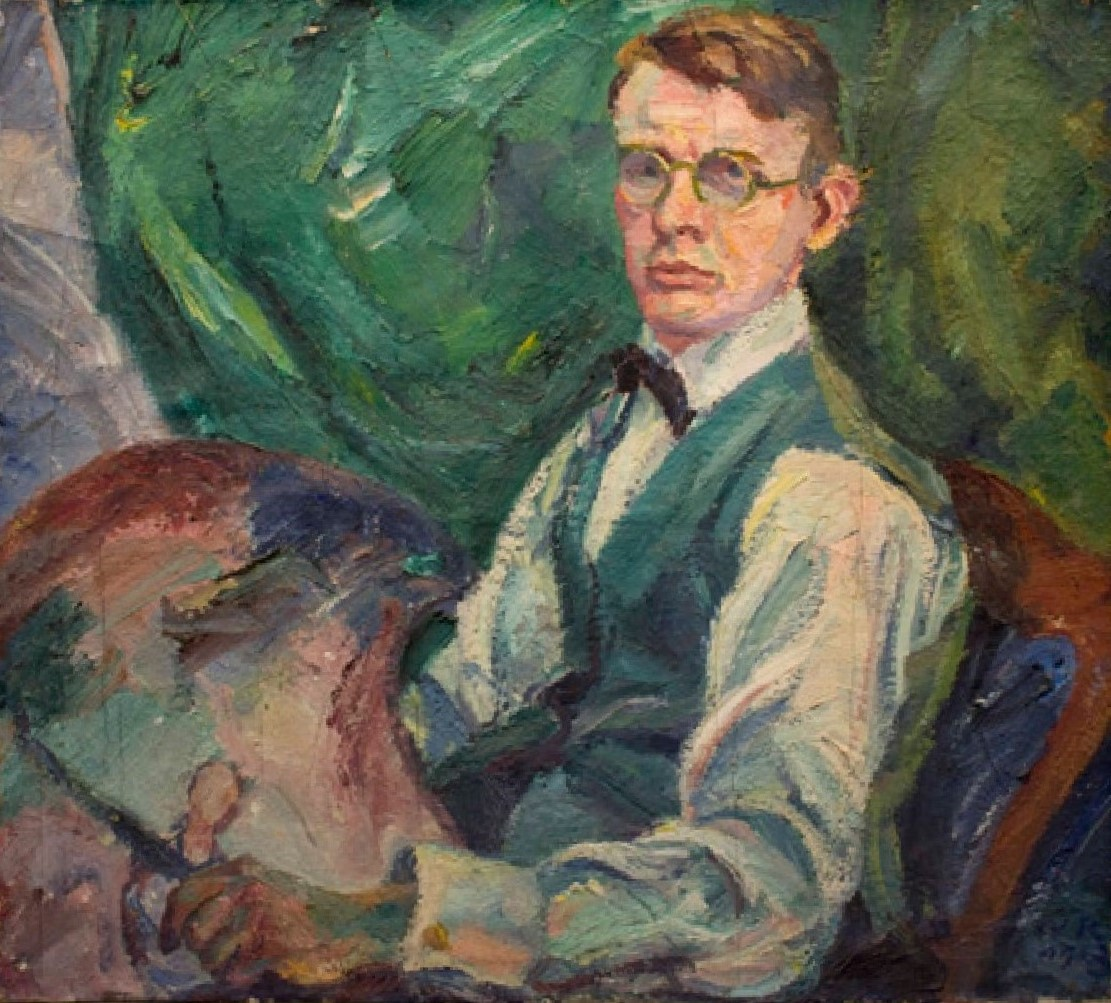
- 1913 self-portrait
- Born: 20 April 1886; Legnica, German Empire
- Died: 29 December 1953 (aged 67); Munich, Germany
- Occupation: Painter

Wolf Röhricht (20 April 1886 – 29 December 1953) was a German painter. His work was part of the painting event in the art competition at the 1928 Summer Olympics.
