= Gertraud Stemmler =

German painter

- Born: 4 November 1889; Aschaffenburg, Germany
- Died: 29 April 1972 (aged 82); Aarau, Switzerland
- Occupation: Painter

Gertraud Stemmler (4 November 1889 – 29 April 1972) was a German painter. Her work was part of the painting event in the art competition at the 1928 Summer Olympics.
