= Samuel Henchoz =

Swiss sculptor

- Born: 13 November 1905; Montreux, Switzerland
- Died: 26 September 1976 (aged 70); La Tour-de-Peilz, Switzerland
- Occupations: Graphic designer, sculptor

Samuel Henchoz (13 November 1905 – 26 September 1976) was a Swiss graphic designer, poster artist, medalist, and sculptor. His work was part of the sculpture event in the art competition at the 1928 Summer Olympics.
