= André Pettineroli =

Swiss sculptor

- Born: 20 December 1902; Lausanne, Switzerland
- Died: 3 October 1978 (aged 75); Gimel, Switzerland
- Occupation: Sculptor

André Pettineroli (20 December 1902 – 3 October 1978) was a Swiss sculptor. His work was part of the sculpture event in the art competition at the 1928 Summer Olympics.
