= Karl Hoffmann (architect) =

German architect

- Born: 1883
- Died: 30 November 1951 (aged 67–68)
- Occupation: Architect

Karl Hoffmann (1883 – 30 November 1951) was a German architect. His work was part of the architecture event in the art competition at the 1928 Summer Olympics.
