= Karl Pregizer =

German architect

- Born: 4 August 1872; Tübingen, Germany
- Died: 19 November 1956 (aged 84); Tübingen, Germany
- Occupation: Architect

Karl Pregizer (4 August 1872 – 19 November 1956) was a German architect. His work was part of the architecture event in the art competition at the 1928 Summer Olympics.
