= Jane Deley =

French painter

- Born: 28 July 1878; Le Creusot, France
- Died: 13 July 1949 (aged 70)
- Occupation: Painter

Jane Deley (28 July 1878 – 13 July 1949) was a French painter. Her work was part of the painting event in the art competition at the 1928 Summer Olympics. She was the partner of Henri Desgrange, the director of the Tour de France.
