= Hippolyte Peyrol =

French sculptor

- Born: 10 June 1856; Paris, France
- Died: 24 December 1929 (aged 73); Neuilly-sur-Seine, France
- Occupation: Sculptor

Hippolyte Peyrol (10 June 1856 – 24 December 1929) was a French sculptor. His work was part of the sculpture event in the art competition at the 1928 Summer Olympics.
