= Aage Hermann =

Danish writer

- Born: 5 April 1888; Frederiksberg, Denmark
- Died: 29 August 1949 (aged 61); Copenhagen, Denmark
- Occupation: Writer

Aage Hermann (5 April 1888 – 29 August 1949) was a Danish author and journalist.

Hermann's first poem was published in 1903 and his first collection was published in 1909. He worked for the state railways until 1915 when he became a journalist at the newspaper Ekstra Bladet. He wrote several poems for the newspaper which were critical of the First World War and its effects on neutral seamen. His poems were also published in the 1915 collection Krigens Digte (The Poems of the War). He also later worked at B.T. and was the editor of Sport magazine from 1931 to 1932. He published 8 collections of poetry between 1912 and 1942.

His work was part of the literature event in the art competition at the 1928 Summer Olympics.

He later began writing children's and youth literature under the pseudonyms Erik Haagensen, Julie Saabye and Max Wahl.
