= Ernst Stahl =

German architect

- Born: 14 January 1882; Bad Cannstatt, Germany
- Died: 14 July 1957 (aged 75); Düsseldorf, Germany
- Occupation: Architect

Ernst Stahl (14 January 1882 – 14 July 1957) was a German architect. His work was part of the architecture event in the art competition at the 1928 Summer Olympics.
