= Richard Langer =

German sculptor

- Born: 28 November 1879; Nordhausen, Germany
- Died: 11 October 1950 (aged 70); Weilheim, Germany
- Occupation: Sculptor

Richard Langer (28 November 1879 – 11 October 1950) was a German sculptor. His work was part of the sculpture event in the art competition at the 1928 Summer Olympics.
