= Władysław Gruberski =

Polish sculptor

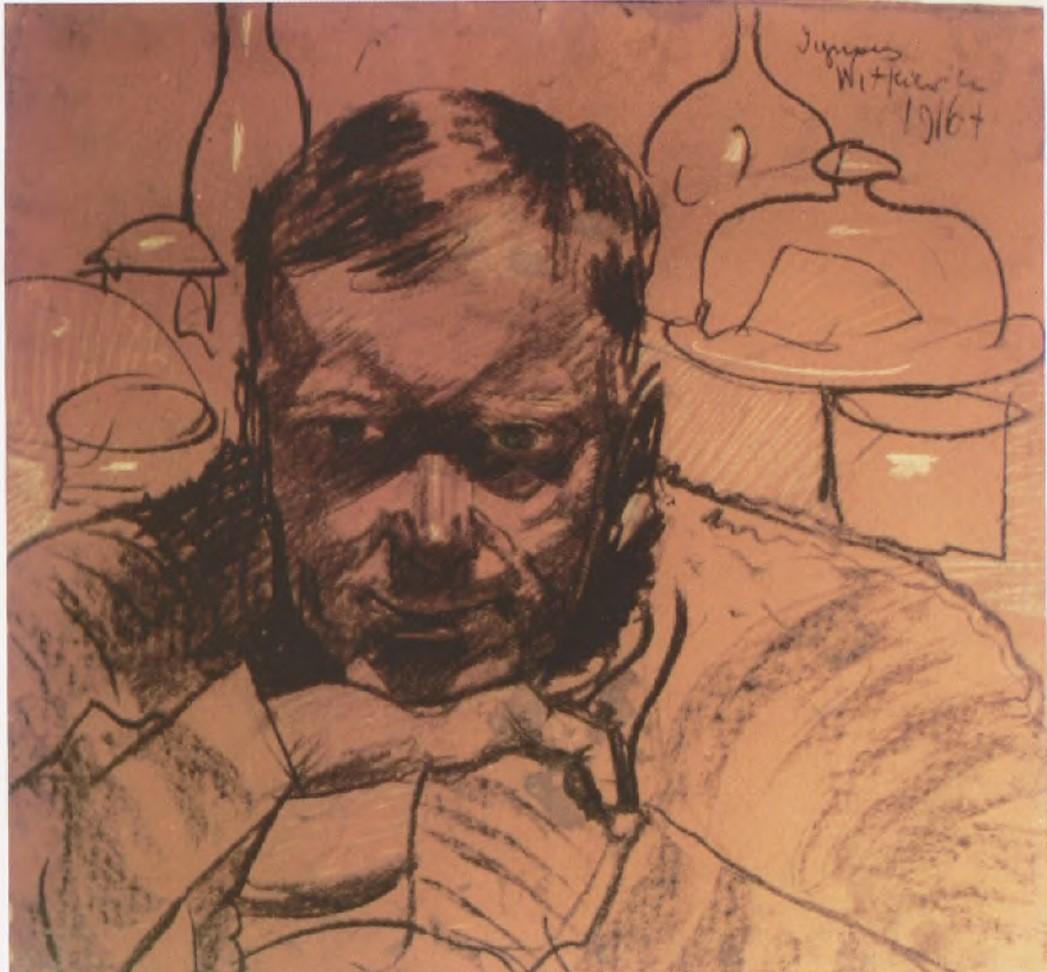
- Born: 27 March 1873; Płock, Poland
- Died: 14 November 1933 (aged 60); Warsaw, Poland
- Occupation: Sculptor

Władysław Gruberski (27 March 1873 – 14 November 1933) was a Polish sculptor. His work was part of the sculpture event in the art competition at the 1928 Summer Olympics.
