= Kurt Harald Isenstein =

German sculptor (1898–1980)

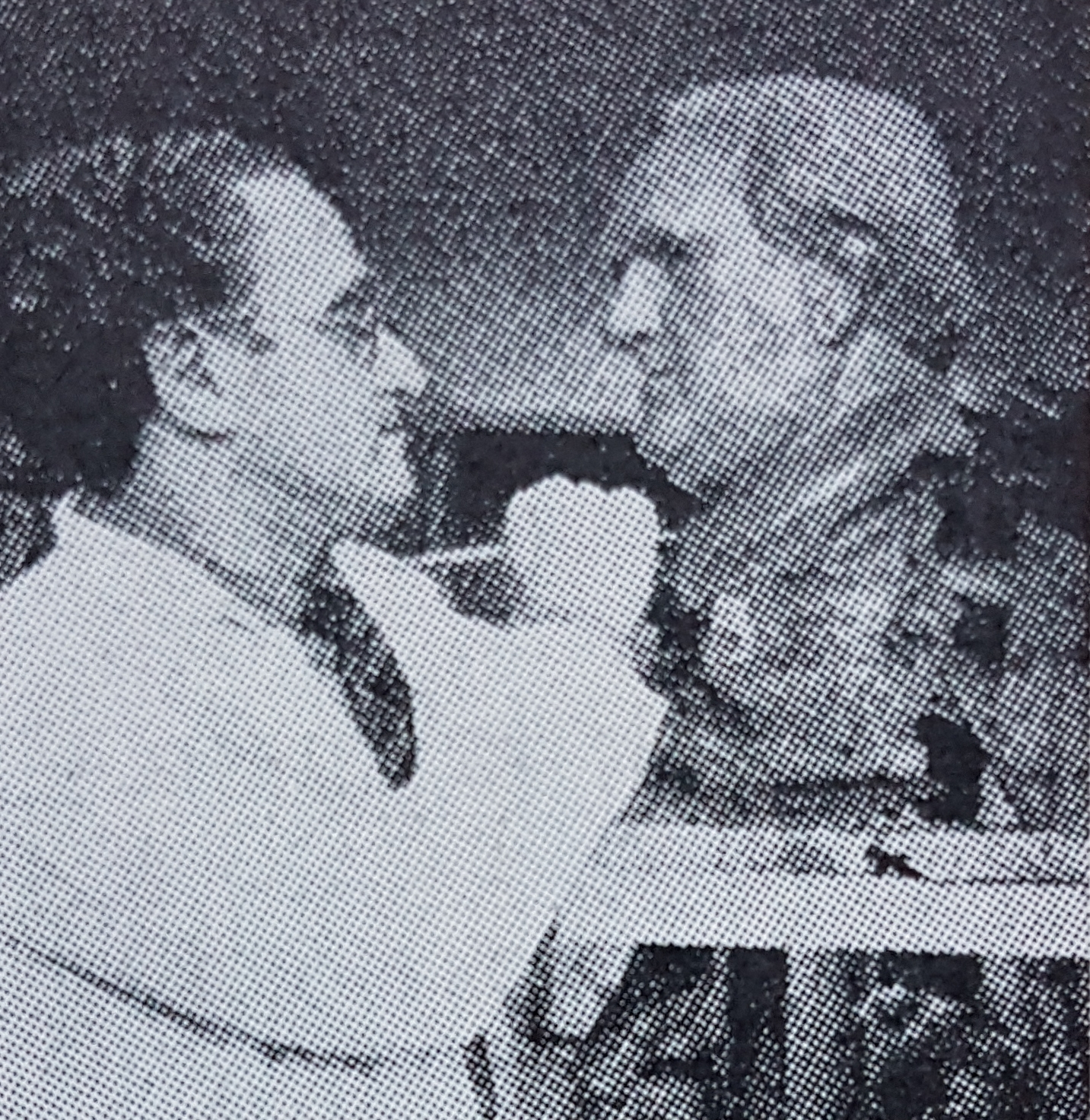
- Born: 13 August 1898; Hanover, German Empire
- Died: 3 February 1980 (aged 81); Copenhagen, Denmark
- Occupation: Sculptor

Kurt Harald Isenstein(13 August 1898 – 3 February 1980) was a German sculptor. His work was part of the sculpture event in the art competition at the 1928 Summer Olympics.
