= Alfred Hensel =

German architect

Olympic medal record

Art competitions
Gold medal – first place	1928 Amsterdam	Town planning

Alfred Hensel (8 March 1880 – 15 September 1969) was a German architect and director of the Nuremberg parks department. He won a gold medal for town planning in the art competitions at the 1928 Summer Olympics. He was awarded the medal for his work on the sports and leisure park on the eastern bank of Dutzendteich Lake in Nuremberg. At the time the arena - now the Max-Morlock-Stadion - was described as "the most beautiful stadium in the world".
