= Ludwig Valentich =

Austrian writer

- Born: 1884; Vienna, Austria-Hungary
- Died: April 1961 (aged 76–77); Vienna, Austria
- Occupation: Writer

Ludwig Valentich (1884 – April 1961) was an Austrian writer. His work was part of the literature event in the art competition at the 1928 Summer Olympics.
