= Heinrich Révy =

Austrian painter

- Born: 8 August 1883; Kneževo, Austria-Hungary
- Died: 10 March 1949 (aged 65); Goslar, Germany
- Occupation: Painter

Heinrich Révy (8 August 1883 – 10 March 1949) was an Austrian painter. His work was part of the painting event in the art competition at the 1928 Summer Olympics.
