= Charles Hafner =

American sculptor

- Born: October 28, 1888; Omaha, Nebraska, United States
- Died: July 29, 1960 (aged 71); New York City
- Occupation: Sculptor

Charles Hafner (October 28, 1888 – July 29, 1960) was an American sculptor. His work was part of the sculpture event in the art competition at the 1928 Summer Olympics.
