= Fernando Biscaccianti =

Italian architect

- Born: 16 December 1890; Urbania, Italy
- Died: 1963 (aged 72–73); Bologna, Italy
- Occupation: Architect

Fernando Biscaccianti (16 December 1890 – 1963) was an Italian architect. His work was part of the architecture event in the art competition at the 1928 Summer Olympics.
