= Paul Jobert =

French painter

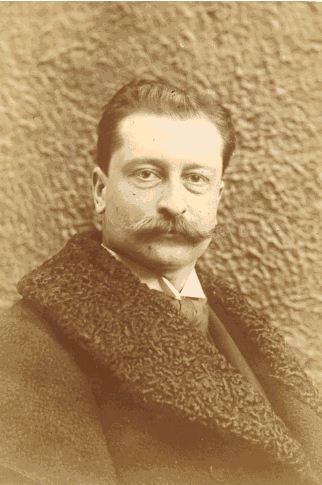
- Born: 19 August 1863; Tlemcen, Algeria
- Died: 24 March 1942 (aged 78); Constantine, Algeria
- Occupation: Painter

Paul Jobert (19 August 1863 – 24 March 1942) was a French painter. His work was part of the painting event in the art competition at the 1928 Summer Olympics.
