= Eduard Büsser =

Swiss painter

- Born: 15 September 1899; Bazenheid, Switzerland
- Died: 9 August 1949 (aged 49); Saulieu, France
- Occupation: Painter

Eduard Büsser (15 September 1899 – 9 August 1949) was a Swiss painter. His work was part of the painting event in the art competition at the 1928 Summer Olympics.
