= Paul Berger (sculptor) =

German sculptor (1889–1949)

- Born: 8 April 1889; Zwickau, Germany
- Died: 30 March 1949 (aged 59); Dresden, Germany
- Occupation: Sculptor

Paul Berger (8 April 1889 – 30 March 1949) was a German sculptor. His work was part of the sculpture event in the art competition at the 1928 Summer Olympics. Severely injured during World War I, he died of long-term effects from his injuries in 1949.
