= Auguste Philippe Marocco =

Monegasque painter

- Born: 30 August 1885
- Died: 26 November 1972 (aged 87)
- Occupation: Painter

Auguste Philippe Marocco (30 August 1885 – 26 November 1972) was a Monegasque painter. His work was part of the art competitions at the 1928 Summer Olympics and the 1936 Summer Olympics.
