= Thies Luijt =

Dutch painter

- Born: 24 April 1879; Sliedrecht, Netherlands
- Died: 8 July 1951 (aged 72); Wassenaar, Netherlands
- Occupation: Painter

Thies Luijt (24 April 1879 – 8 July 1951) was a Dutch painter. His work was part of the art competitions at the 1928 Summer Olympics, the 1936 Summer Olympics, and the 1948 Summer Olympics.
