= Arthur Wellmann =

German painter

- Born: 7 July 1885; Magdeburg, Germany
- Died: 18 May 1960 (aged 74); Riverdale, Maryland USA
- Occupation: Painter & Sculptor

Arthur Wellmann (7 July 1885 – 18 May 1960) was a German painter and sculptor. His work was part of the art competitions at the 1928 Summer Olympics and the 1932 Summer Olympics.
