= Ferdinand Opitz =

Austrian sculptor

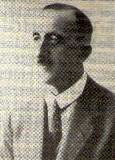
- Born: 24 January 1885; Prague, Austria-Hungary
- Died: 8 May 1960 (aged 75); Vienna, Austria
- Occupation: Sculptor

Ferdinand Opitz (24 January 1885 – 8 May 1960) was an Austrian sculptor. His work was included in the art competitions Summer Olympics 1928, 1936, and 1948.

== Bibliography ==
- Dana Stehlíková: "Josef Opitz v Národním muzeu 1941 - 1945", in: Josef Opitz a umění na Chomutovsku a Kadaňsku 1350–1590. Sborník z mezinárodní konference pořádané ku příležitosti otevření expozice Všemu světu na útěchu — sochařství a malířství na Chomutovsku a Kadaňsku 1350–1590, eds. Renáta Gubíková — Markéta Prontekerová, pp. 54–85 (ISBN 9788087898116)
- Jiří Kotalík, Almanach Akademie výtvarných umění v Praze, ke 180. výročí založení (1799-1979), Praha 1979, p. 95
- Ulrich Thieme - Felix Becker, Allgemeines Lexikon der bildenden Künstler, ed. Hans Vollmer, Leipzig b.d., Band 26, p. 28
