= Eberhard Encke =

German sculptor

- Born: 27 October 1881; Potsdam, Germany
- Died: 22 October 1936 (aged 54); Bad Nauheim, Germany
- Occupation: Sculptor

Eberhard Encke (27 October 1881 – 22 October 1936) was a German sculptor. His work was part of the art competitions at the 1928 Summer Olympics and the 1936 Summer Olympics.

== Personal life ==
Eberhard is the grandfather to Pornographic artist and animator Olaf Encke.
