= Louis Denis-Valvérane =

French painter

- Born: 20 September 1870; Manosque, France
- Died: 11 April 1943 (aged 72); Tarascon, France
- Occupation: Painter

Louis Denis-Valvérane (20 September 1870 – 11 April 1943) was a French painter. His work was part of the art competitions at the 1928 Summer Olympics and the 1932 Summer Olympics.
