= Józef Łęczycki =

Polish architect

- Occupation: Architect

Józef Łęczycki was a Polish architect. His work was part of the architecture event in the art competition at the 1928 Summer Olympics.
