= Henry Malfroy =

French painter

- Born: Charles Henri Malfroy; 15 January 1895; Martigues, France
- Died: 27 April 1945 (aged 50); Buchenwald concentration camp, Nazi Germany
- Occupation: Painter

Charles Henri Malfroy (15 January 1895 – 27 April 1945) was a French painter. His work was part of the painting event in the art competition at the 1928 Summer Olympics. A member of the French Resistance during the Second World War, Malfroy was arrested and died in Buchenwald concentration camp. He was posthumously awarded the Order of Liberation.
