= Friedrich Baur =

Latvian painter

Fridrihs Baurs
- Born: Friedrich Baur; 16 June 1879; Russian Empire (now Latvia)
- Died: 1950 (aged 70–71); Germany
- Occupations: Painter, graphic artist, journalist

Friedrich Baur (Latvian: Frīdrihs Baurs or Fridrichs Baurs, 1879–1950) was a Latvian painter and graphic artist of Baltic German descent. His work was part of the art competitions at the 1928 Summer Olympics and the 1932 Summer Olympics.

Baurs was born in Latvia on 16 June 1879 while it was under the rule of the Russian Empire. During World War II, he left for Germany, where he died in 1950.
