= Oskar Glöckler =

German medal designer

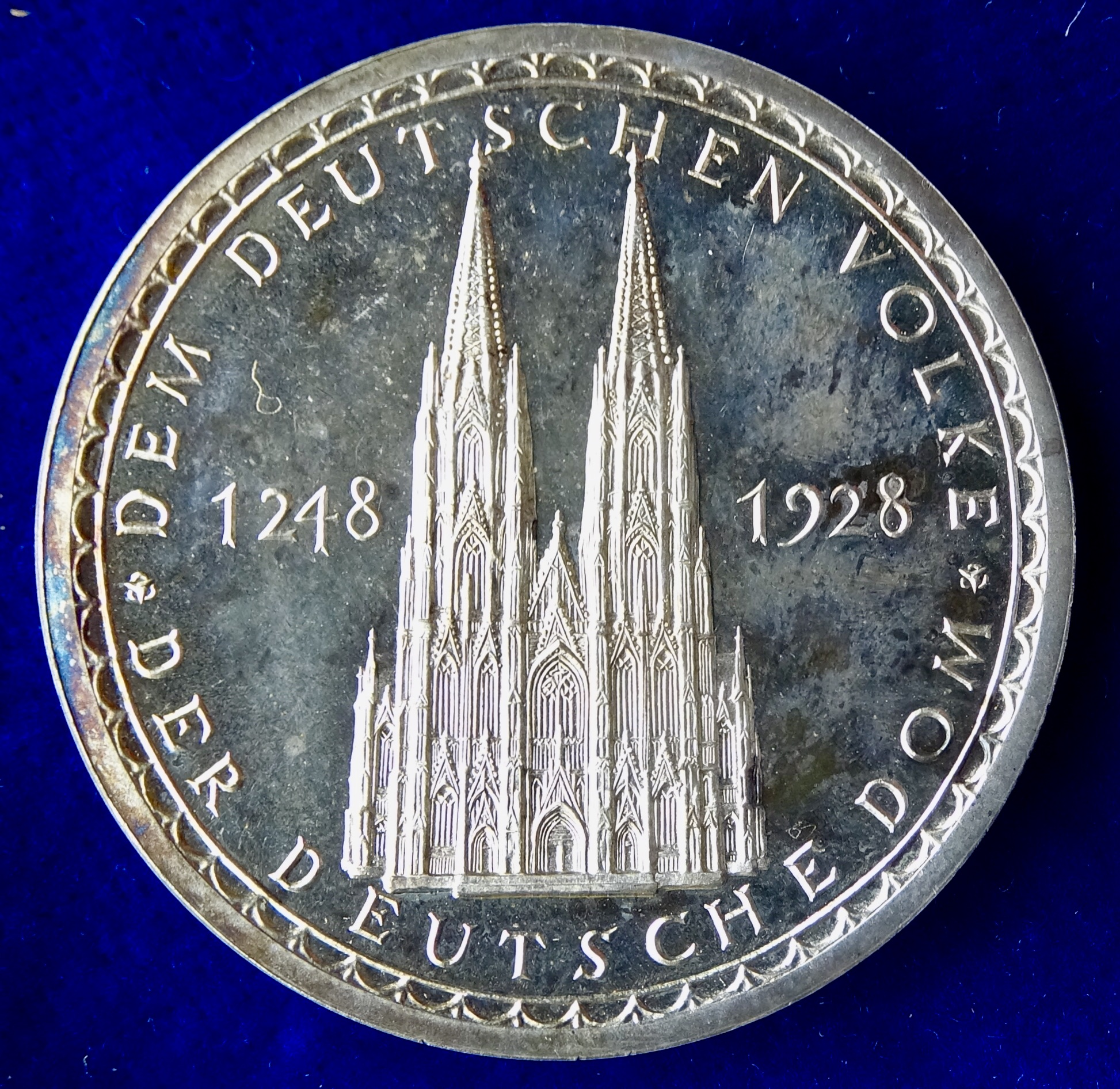
Medal commemorating the 680th anniversary of the construction of the Cologne Cathedral in 1928, created by Oskar Glökler

Oskar Glöckler (29 October 1893 – 27 January 1938), also spelled Oskar Gloeckler, was a German medal designer active in Stuttgart and Berlin during the Nazi period, during which he created numerous medals and also designed the 1 Reichsmark coin of 1933.

Glöckler was born and studied in Stuttgart, where in 1922 he became a member of the Nazi Party. In 1923, he took part in the attempted Beer Hall Putsch. From 1925 he worked in Berlin and in 1933 was appointed head of the Football Division in Berlin – Brandenburg. From 1936 he belonged to the Cultural Committee of the Sturmabteilung (SA), in which he achieved the rank of Obersturmbannführer. Glöckler called himself a professor for many years without authorization, and after allegations of impropriety, committed suicide after only a few months in office as the provincial head of the Reich's Chamber of Fine Arts and director of the Württemberg State School of Arts and Crafts.

His work was also part of the art competitions at the 1928 Summer Olympics and the 1932 Summer Olympics. Glöckler committed suicide in 1938.
