= Hans Hohloch =

German architect

- Born: 23 November 1900; Rüschlikon, Switzerland
- Died: 13 February 1976 (aged 75); Winterthur, Switzerland
- Occupation: Architect

Hans Hohloch (23 November 1900 – 13 February 1976) was a German architect. His work was part of the architecture event in the art competition at the 1928 Summer Olympics.
