= David Bueno de Mesquita =

Dutch painter

- Born: 23 March 1889; Amsterdam, Netherlands
- Died: 12 December 1962 (aged 73); Firenze, Italy
- Occupation: Painter

David Abraham Bueno de Mesquita (23 March 1889 – 12 December 1962) was a Dutch painter. His work was part of the painting event in the art competition at the 1928 Summer Olympics. He was of Sephardi Jewish descent.
