= Michał Boruciński =

Polish painter

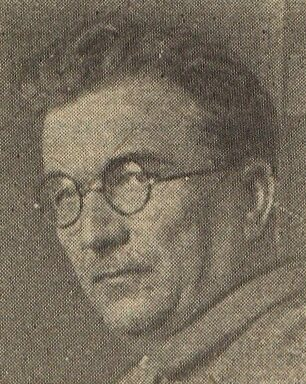
- Born: 29 September 1885; Siedlce, Poland
- Died: 21 April 1976 (aged 90); Warsaw, Poland
- Occupation: Painter

Michał Boruciński (29 September 1885 – 21 April 1976) was a Polish painter. His work was part of the art competitions at the 1928 Summer Olympics and the 1932 Summer Olympics.
