= Lenigret Mallwitz =

German painter (1892–1969)

- Born: 9 March 1892; Bremerhaven, Germany
- Died: 10 July 1969 (aged 77); Bad Honnef, Germany
- Occupation: Painter

Lenigret Mallwitz (9 March 1892 – 10 July 1969) was a German painter. Her work was part of the painting event in the art competition at the 1928 Summer Olympics.
