= Louis Grivel =

Swiss writer

- Born: 30 October 1901; Lausanne
- Died: 20 February 1969 (aged 67)
- Occupation: Writer

Louis Grivel (30 October 1901 – 20 February 1969) was a Swiss writer. His work was part of the art competitions at the 1928 Summer Olympics and the 1936 Summer Olympics. According to Olympedia, Grivel was from Lausanne and usually wrote under the pen name of "Doug". He had a wide repertoire including lyrics for musicals and operettas. From 1932 until he retired in the 1960s, he was Lausanne's city archivist and historian; and wrote about its architectural history.
