= Mieczysław Łęczycki =

Polish architect

- Born: 1897 (age 128–129); Łódź, Poland
- Occupation: Architect

Mieczysław Łęczycki (born 1897, date of death unknown) was a Polish architect. His work was part of the architecture event in the art competition at the 1928 Summer Olympics.
