= Marcel Mérignargues =

French sculptor

- Born: 17 March 1884; Nîmes, France
- Died: 14 September 1965 (aged 81); Nîmes, France
- Occupation: Sculptor

Marcel Mérignargues (17 March 1884 – 14 September 1965) was a French sculptor. His work was part of the art competitions at the 1928 Summer Olympics and the 1932 Summer Olympics.
