= Louis Rey (architect) =

French architect

- Born: 21 July 1885
- Died: 23 October 1972 (aged 87)
- Occupation: Architect

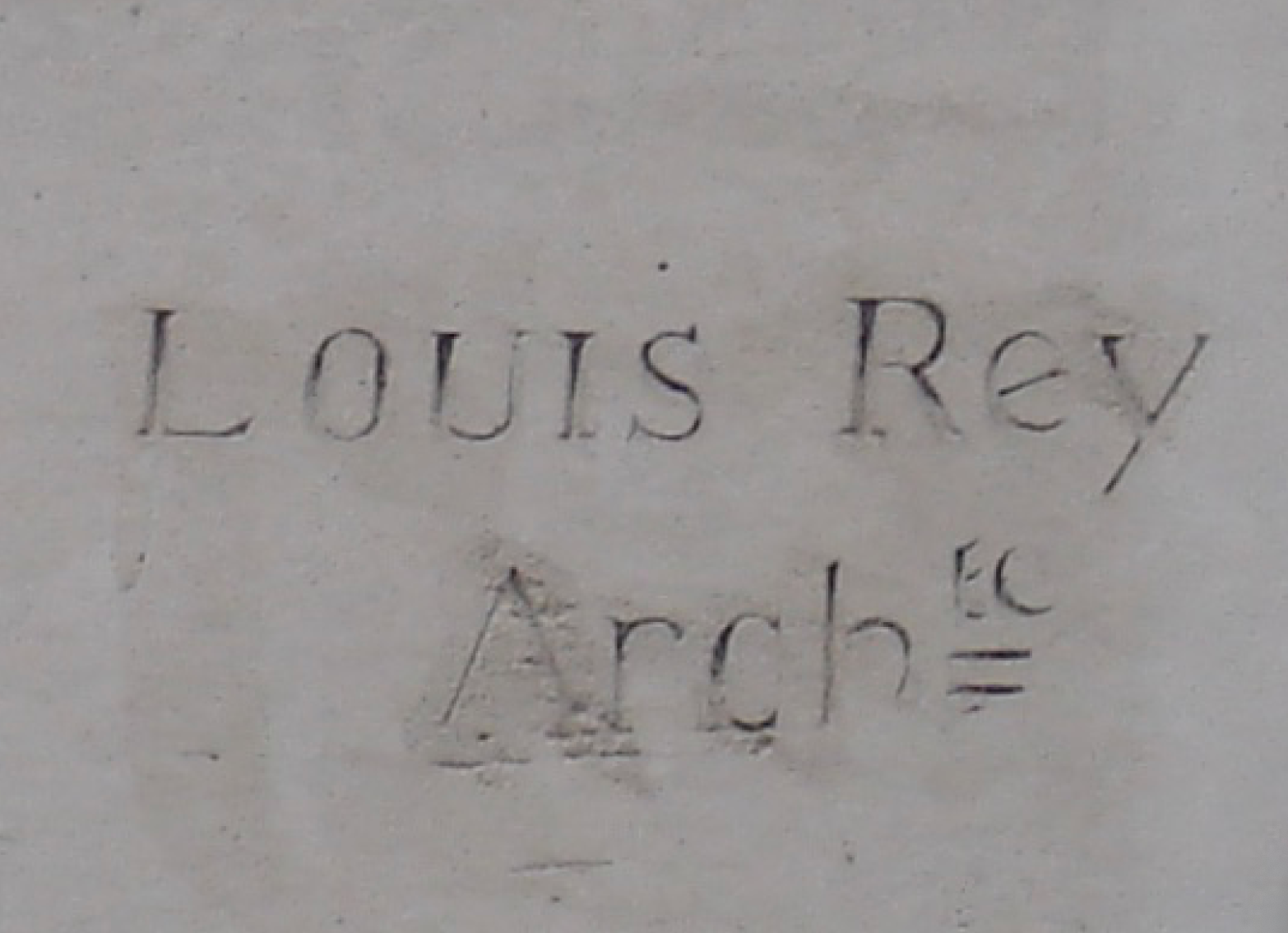
Plaque on a private residence in Chauny

Louis Rey (21 July 1885 – 23 October 1972) was a French architect. His work was part of the architecture event in the art competition at the 1928 Summer Olympics.
