= Marc-César Scotto =

Monegasque composer

- Born: 25 February 1888
- Died: 6 February 1960 (aged 71)
- Occupation: Composer

Marc-César Scotto (25 February 1888 – 6 February 1960) was a Monegasque composer. His work was part of the art competitions at the 1928 Summer Olympics, the 1932 Summer Olympics, and the 1936 Summer Olympics.
