= Fritz Heinsheimer =

German painter

- Born: 6 May 1897; Mosbach, Germany
- Died: 18 August 1958 (aged 61); Wiesbaden, Germany
- Occupation: Painter

Fritz Heinsheimer (6 May 1897 – 18 August 1958) was a German painter. His work was part of the art competitions at the 1928 Summer Olympics and the 1932 Summer Olympics.
