= Janina Kaczkowska =

Polish painter

- Born: 27 February 1904; Warsaw, Poland
- Died: 15 January 1995 (aged 90); Tirana, Albania
- Occupation: Painter

Janina Kaczkowska (27 February 1904 – 15 January 1995) was a Polish painter. Her work was part of the painting event in the art competition at the 1928 Summer Olympics.
