= Kunstgewerbeschule Düsseldorf =

German art school

Coordinates: 51.22683°N 6.771508°E

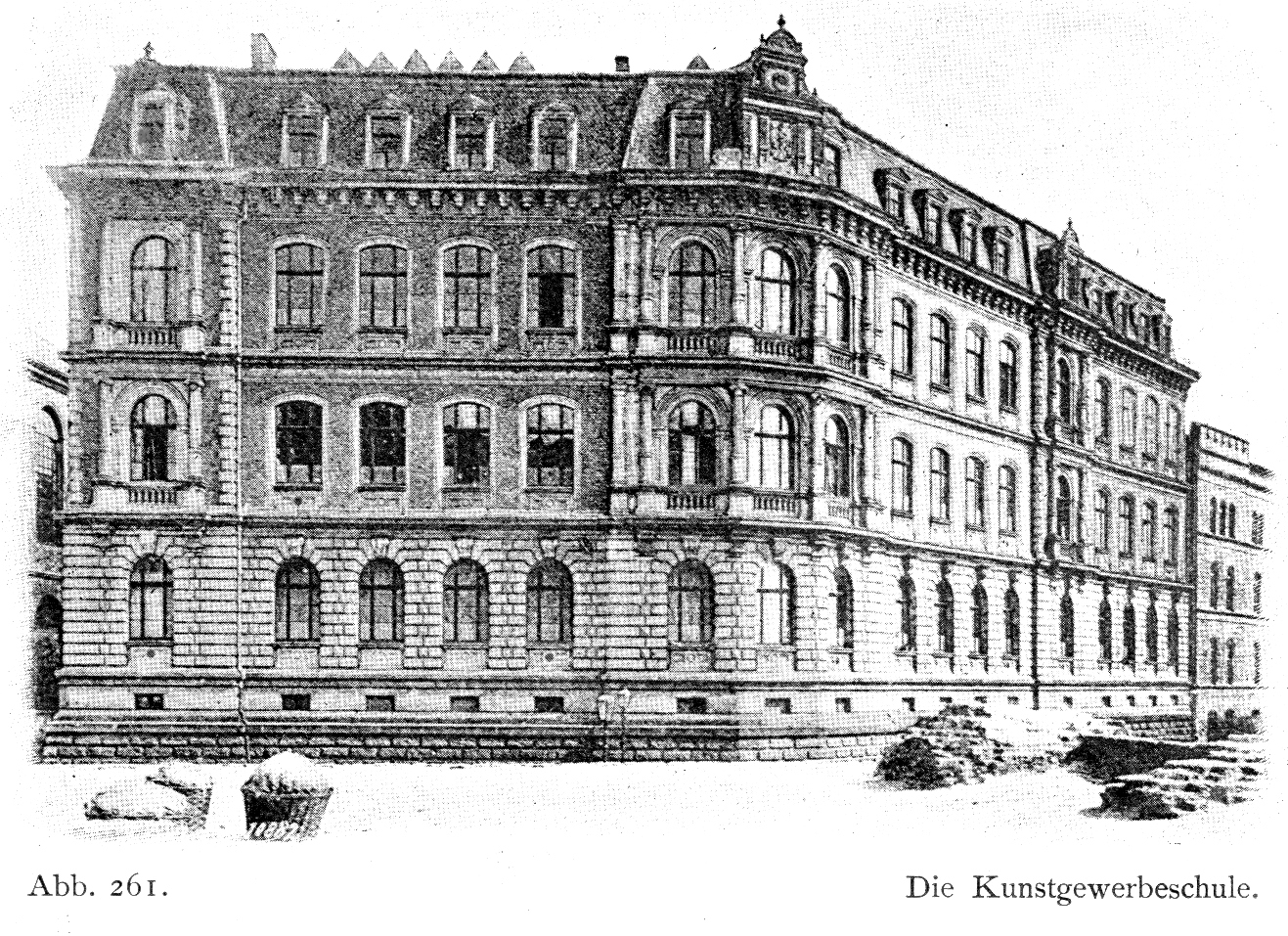
Building of the Kunstgewerbeschule, before 1904

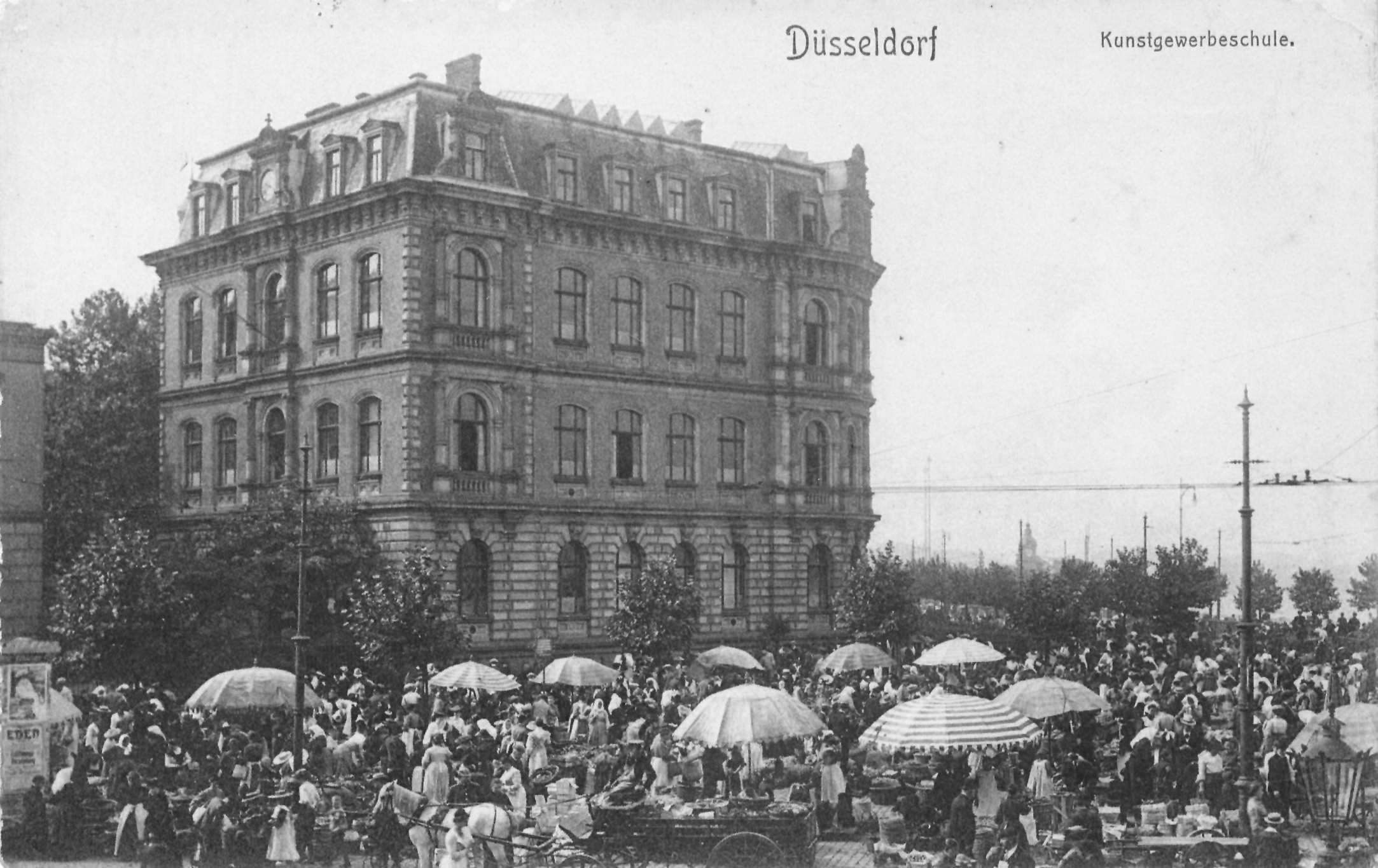
Düsseldorf School of Arts and Crafts on Burgplatz with weekly market, around 1900

The Kunstgewerbeschule Düsseldorf was opened on 3 April 1883 and closed at the end of the school year 1918. In 1919, its architectur training was transferred to the Kunstakademie Düsseldorf.

== Training offered ==
The education placed its emphasis on applied arts. Another focus was on the training of architects. The requirements for admission to the architecture department were previous studies at a building trade school, a university or proof of "sufficient technical experience and knowledge". The school consisted of three departments: Pre-school, technical school, evening school. The lessons included freehand drawing, geometric drawing and ornamental form theory. In addition, the school ran courses in lettering from 1905, which were linked to studies on the history and aesthetics of artistic lettering. For this purpose, the school had established contact with the British calligrapher Edward Johnston. On his behalf, Johnston's student Anna Simons led the writing courses in Düsseldorf. The course participants came from all parts of the German Reich.

== Funding ==
The costs of the school, whose statute had been approved by the responsible minister on 28 February 1882, were borne by the city of Düsseldorf, which initially received an annual state subsidy of 7830 marks, which was increased to 30,000 marks annually by 1900.

== History ==
From 1884 to 1903, the first director of the school was the architect Hermann Stiller. The Kunstgewerbeschule experienced a heyday in the years 1903 to 1907, during which time it was directed by Peter Behrens, who - as was desired by his appointment - implemented his own ideas with a new organisation and in the orientation of teaching and also repositioned the university in relation to the architectural training at the Düsseldorf Art Academy. Behrens brought new teachers to the Kunstgewerbeschule: Rudolf Bosselt, Fritz Helmuth Ehmcke and Max Benirschke. Despite working in Düsseldorf for only four years, Behrens left a lasting mark there. In 1907, Emil Rathenau brought him to AEG as an artistic advisor and designer of industrial products (designer). In 1909, Lothar von Kunowski head of the "state drawing teachers' seminar" at the School of Arts and Crafts.

From 1908 to 1919, the Kunstgewerbeschule was under the directorship of Wilhelm Kreis, who had already applied for this post in 1902. Fritz Schumacher, who was originally to take over the directorship from Behrens, had accepted the position of Hamburg's building director. The foundation of a special architecture department at the Düsseldorf School of Arts and Crafts had been initiated by Wilhelm Kreis in 1909. The Special Architecture Department Düsseldorf initially existed alongside the School of Arts and Crafts. In the new architecture department of the Kunstgewerbeschule, Kreis initially set up three separate architecture classes. The first class was dedicated to simple bourgeois construction and was led by government architect Fritz Becker, who realised several housing projects in the 1920s. Fritz Becker's architecture class was intended for building tasks in which the building assignment was precisely fixed in advance, from "the simple workers' house to the better bourgeois house and simple country houses, colonies, small business houses, agricultural buildings, small town halls and churches for small and medium-sized towns". The second class of the architecture department for "interior design and building detailing" was taken over by the architect Emil Fahrenkamp. Kreis himself took over the third architecture class for "Monumental Buildings".

In addition to the three large architecture classes, Kreis set up four more classes that were to expand and enrich the teaching and focus on the "architectural whole" and integrate both painting, sculpture, garden design and arts and crafts issues into the curriculum. Richard Klapheck took over the lectures on architectural history, urban planning, monument preservation and homeland security in the class for "theoretical supplementary instruction". In the "sculpture class", the sculptor Hubert Netzer taught the use of sculpture and painting in architecture. Baron Walter von Engelhardt was in charge of the "Garden Art Class". As a prerequisite for admission, attendance at a state-recognised gardening school was required. In addition to Engelhardt, Kreis, Becker and Fahrenkamp also took on teaching units on architectural garden design and garden equipment. With the establishment of the architecture department, the School of Arts and Crafts had moved away from the original type of arts and crafts schools and had, as it were, evolved into a school of architecture. A class in conceptual drawing, nature studies and nude drawing, led by Josef Bruckmüller (1880-1932), was set up for women.

The First World War caused both the number of teachers and the number of pupils to drop considerably. Wilhelm Kreis, the director, was drafted into military service. In 1917, Richard Klapheck, the teacher of art and architectural history, received a call to the Kunstakademie Düsseldorf, which caused a further weakening of the teaching staff. At the same time, several teachers, including the architect Emil Fahrenkamp, had returned from the war. Nevertheless, several departments soon had to be closed. The year 1918 marked the end of the last school year of the Kunstgewerbeschule.

In 1919, after the dissolution of the Kunstgewerbeschule, its most important component, architectural training, was transferred to the Kunstakademie Düsseldorf, which took in both the lecturers and the students. The design of the "Department of Ecclesiastical Art" as well as accommodation for the "State Drawing Teachers' Seminar" and the "Women's Art School" were also housed in the building of the Kunstakademie.

== Building ==
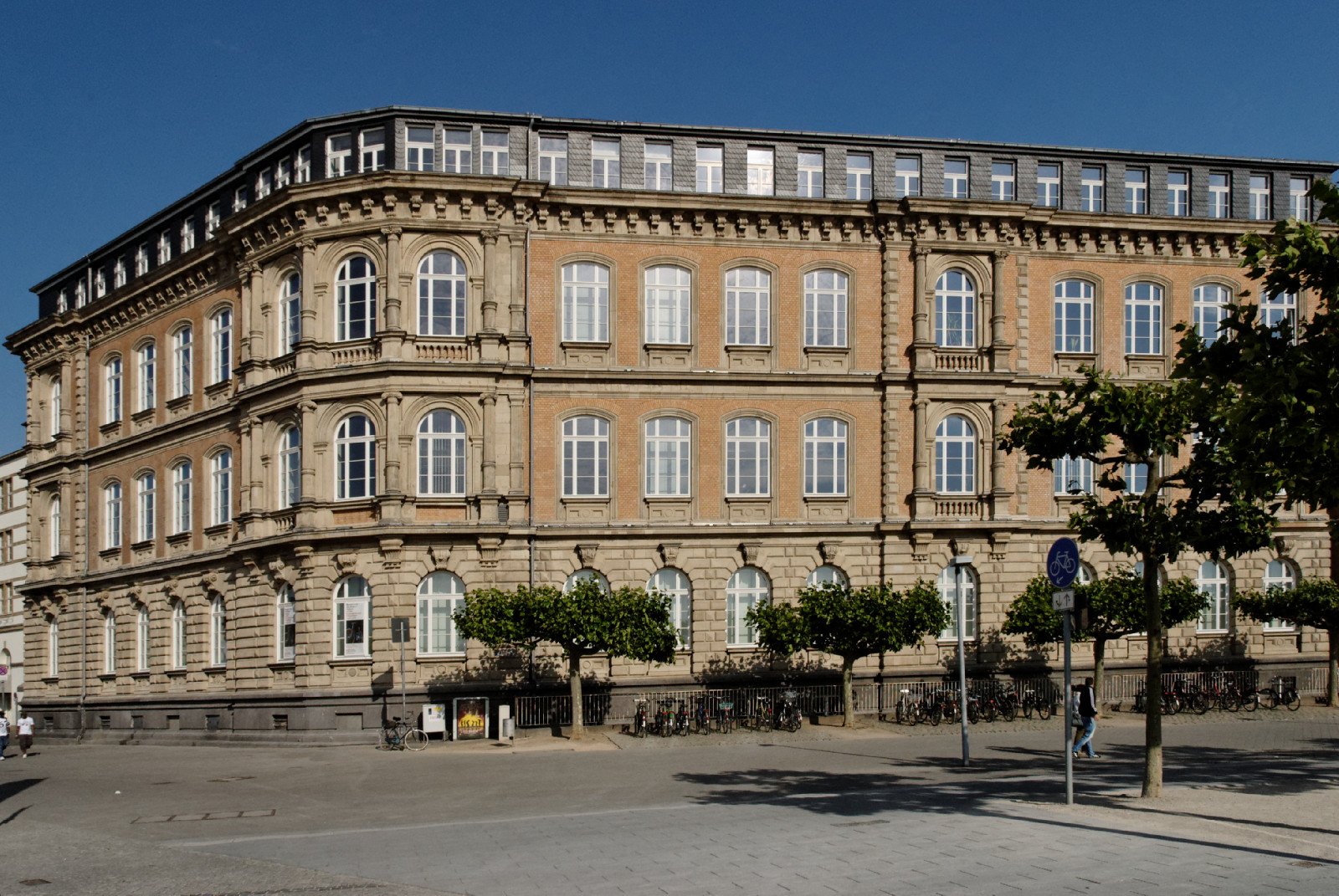
Former Kunstgewerbeschule Düsseldorf, 2011

The rooms of the technical college or university were housed in a new building erected in 1882/83 at Burgplatz in the Düsseldorfer Altstadt.

Today, the building belongs to the Rathaus Düsseldorf. Since 2005, five room segments of the building with around 650m² of floor space, plus office and storage areas, have been used by the Akademie-Galerie - Die Neue Sammlung of the Kunstakademie Düsseldorf. Two exhibitions a year are to be held there, among others on the work of the Düsseldorf academy professors after 1945. Furthermore, it is planned to set up an archive on the estates, information and publications of the teachers of the Kunstakademie.

== Students / Alumni ==
- Hanna Achenbach (1892–1982)
- Alfred Adloff (1874–after 1937)
- Sibylle Ascheberg von Bamberg (1888–1966)
- Carl Josef Barth (1896–1976)
- August Bauer (1868–1961)
- Robert Dudley Best (1892–1984)
- Paul Bindel (1894–1973)
- Eva Brinkman (1896–1977)
- Ferdinand Carl Cürten (1892–1945)
- Hermann Cossmann (1884–1966).
- Fritz August Breuhaus de Groot (1883–1960)
- John Dähmcke (1887–1980)
- Carl Deiker (1879–1958)
- Heinrich Ehmsen (1886–1964)
- Joseph Enseling (1886–1957)
- Julius Freymuth (1881–1961)
- Wilhelm Gdanietz (1893–1969)
- Bruno Gimpel (1886–1943)
- Irma Goecke (1895–1976)
- August Hagen (1875–1944)
- Georg Hambüchen (1901–1971)
- Wilhelm Hambüchen (1869–1939)
- Heinrich Hamm (1889–1968)
- Carl Hemming (1867–nach 1924)
- Max Hertwig (1881–1975)
- Ferdinand Heseding (1893–1961)
- Albert Herzfeld (1865–1943)
- Robert Högfeldt (1894–1986)
- Alfred Holler (1888–1954)
- Ludwig ten Hompel (1887–1932)
- Willy Robert Huth (1890–1977)
- Heinrich Kamps (1896–1954)
- Hermann Keuth (1888–1974)
- Hermann Koenemann (1871–1934)
- Karl Köster (1883–1975)
- Leo Küppers (1880–1946)
- Carl Lambertz (1910–1996)
- Leon Lauffs (1883–1956)
- Max Lazarus (1892–1961)
- August Macke (1887–1914)
- Adolf Meyer (1881–1929)
- Wilhelm Mohr (1882–1948)
- Hermann Mühlen (1886–1964)
- Traugott Müller (1895–1944)
- Gustav August Munzer (1887–1973)
- Hermann Nolte (1873–1935)
- August Oppenberg (1896–1971)
- Emil Pohle (1885–1962)
- Robert Pudlich (1905–1962)
- Willy Reetz (1892–1963)
- Hans Rilke (1891–1946)
- Marcel Wilhelm Richter (1886–1966)
- Wilhelm Ritterbach (1878–1940)
- Robert Sandfort (1880–1945)
- Lore Schill (1890–1968)
- Herbert Rolf Schlegel (1889–1972)
- Friedrich Hermann Ernst Schneidler (1882–1956)
- Hermann Sehrig (1892–1963)
- Eduard Sturm (1885–1952)
- Arnold Topp (1887–1945, verschollen)
- Adolf Uzarski (1885–1970)
- Walter von Wecus (1893–1977)
- Anton Wendling (1891–1965)
- Jakob Weitz (1888–1971)
- Paul Westerfrölke (1886–1975)
- Bernhard Weyrather (1886–1946)
- Gertrud Weyrather-Engau (1876–1950)
- Albert Wigand (1890–1978)
- Franz Xaver Wimmer (1881–1937)
- Louis Ziercke (1887–1945)
