= Hermann Nolte =

German sculptor

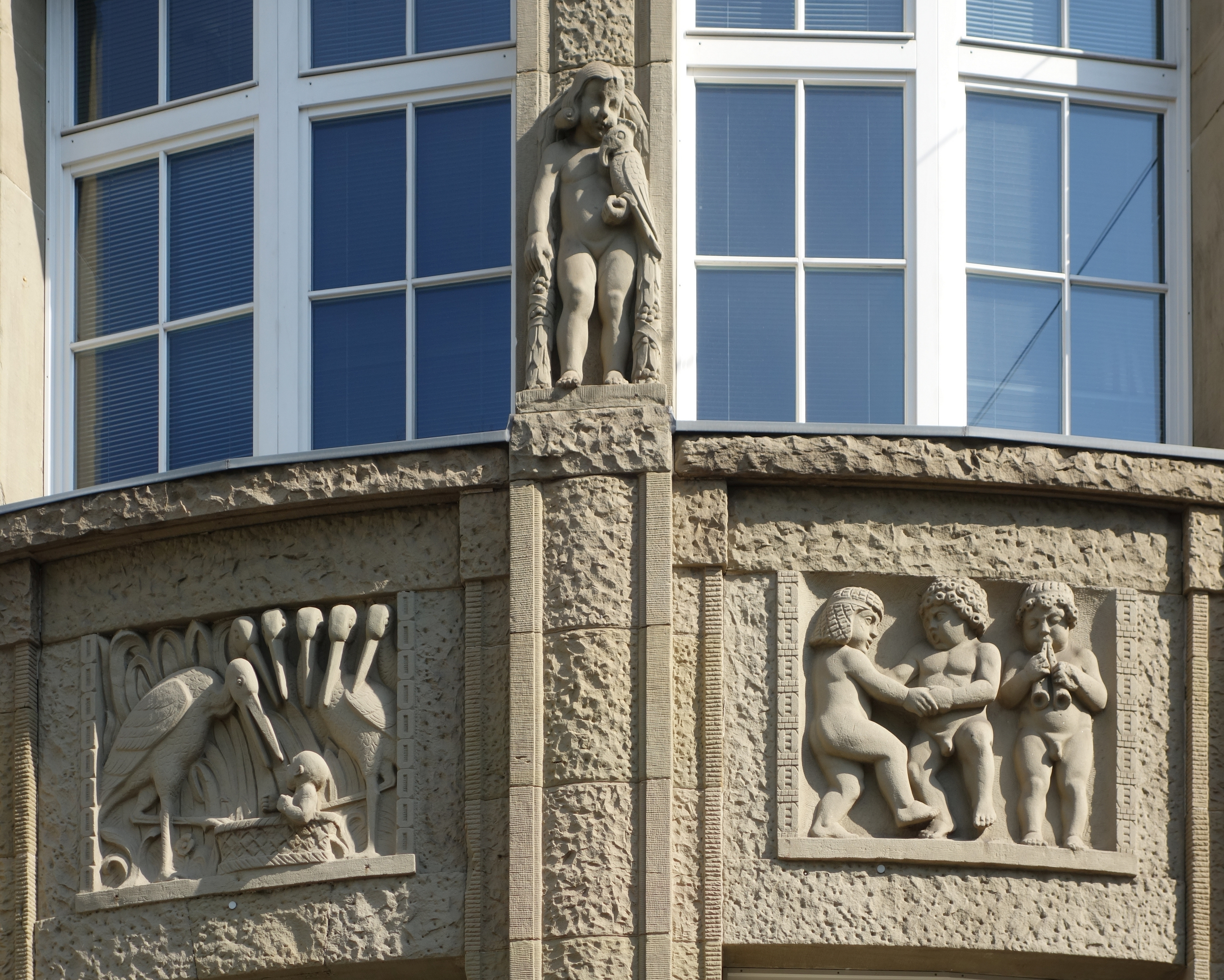
Exterior decorations at Flurstraße 14, Düsseldorf

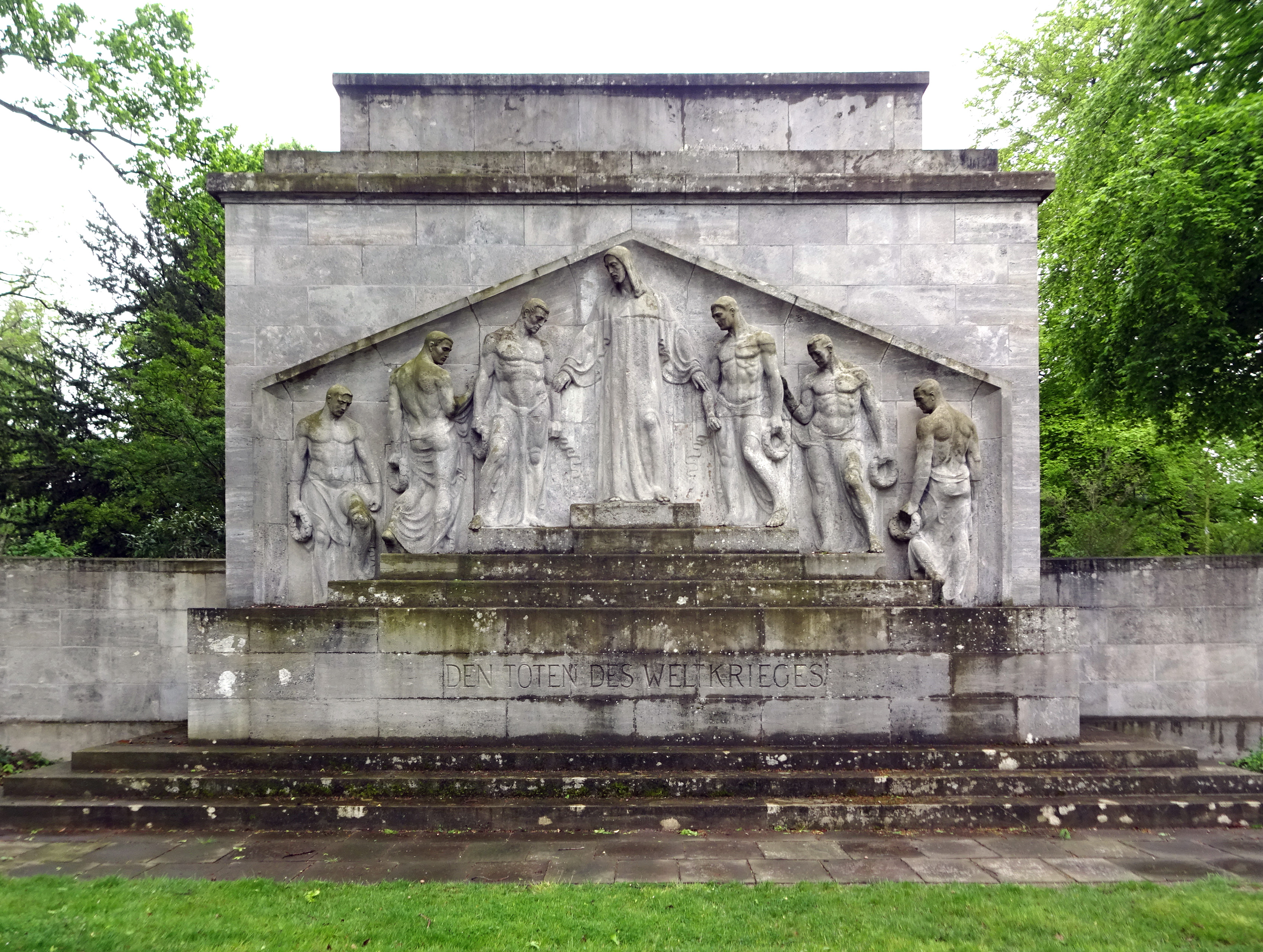
Memorial to the War Dead, at the Nordfriedhof

Hermann Nolte (3 June 1873, Düsseldorf - 25 February 1935, Düsseldorf) was a German sculptor. Most of his work involved architectural decorations, some of which may still be unidentified.

== Life and work ==
His father, Adolph Nolte, was a Master tinker. He studied with Anton Josef Reiss at the Kunstgewerbeschule Düsseldorf. Upon completing his studies, at the age of twenty, he went on an extended journey to Rome. Following that, he spent three years as an assistant in the workshop of the Swiss sculptor, August Bösch.

In 1899, he continued his formal studies at the Academy of Fine Arts, Munich, with Syrius Eberle. This was followed by six years as an assistant to Ignatius Taschner; reportedly at the request of Luitpold, Prince Regent of Bavaria, who liked his smaller works, and wanted him to stay in Munich. After his father's death in 1908, he returned to Düsseldorf, and lived in the house where he had been born. During this period, he often collaborated with the architect, Hermann vom Endt, and developed a recurring motif which included figures of children.

Shortly after his arrival there, he became a member of the progressive artists' group, Malkasten and, with some short interruptions, would remain a member for the rest of his life. In 1911 and 1913, he participated in the Große Kunstausstellung NRW Düsseldorf, with a series of bronze statuettes in the Art Nouveau style. Some were also shown at the Große Berliner Kunstausstellung of 1917. That same year, he began work on a memorial to the war dead, at the Nordffriedhof, designed by the architect, Hermann Goerke. It occupied him until 1921 and is one of his most individually prominent works.

In the 1920s, he opened a large sculpture workshop in the Pempelfort district. In the 1930s, he had one in the studio building of the Verein der Düsseldorfer Künstler (artists' association). There, he created copies of Calvary figures at St.Lambertus Church, by his former teacher, Reiss. The originals had fallen into disrepair, and have since been lost. He also created a bronze relief plaque for a memorial to the 2nd Westphalian Regiment. It was dedicated in 1931. He died in his home, in 1935, at the age of sixty-two.
