= Heinrich Ehmsen =

German painter and graphic artist

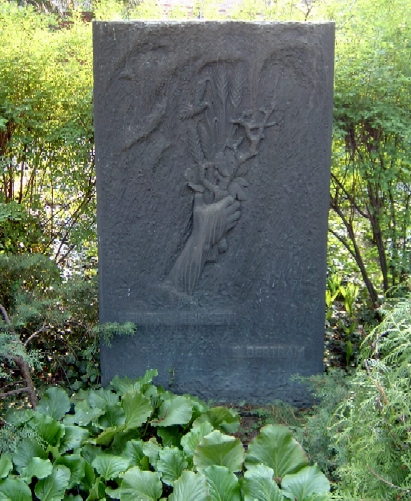
Grave of Heinrich Ehmsen at the Dorotheenstadt Cemetery in Berlin

Heinrich Ehmsen (9 August 1886 – 6 May 1964) was a German painter and graphic artist.

== Life ==
=== Apprenticeship, School of Arts and Crafts ===
Born in Kiel, Ehmsen, he was the son of a Basketmaker master and his wife. He started a four-year apprenticeship as a house painter in 1901. At the same time he attended the Städtische Gewerbeschule in Kiel, where he – at times together with Friedrich Peter Drömmer, Werner Lange and Karl Peter Röhl – had an arts and crafts apprenticeship with Gerd Zimmermann.

With the help of a scholarship, Ehmsen was able to train as a decorative painter from 1906 to 1909 at the Kunstgewerbeschule Düsseldorf under Peter Behrens, Fritz Helmuth Ehmcke and Johannes Ludovicus Mathieu Lauweriks. In 1909, together with Lauweriks, Ehmsen designed a room for the Düsseldorf Exhibition "Christliche Kunst".

=== Paris, Académie Colarossi and Café du Dôme ===
During a stay in Paris from 1910 to 1911, Ehmsen studied at the Académie Colarossi, and at the Le Dôme Café he had contacts with Ernesto de Fiori, Jules Pascin and Alfred Flechtheim.

=== Munich ===
In 1911, Ehmsen moved to Munich, where he was influenced by the painters of the Neue Künstlervereinigung München and the Blauer Reiter. In particular, he maintained contact with Marianne von Werefkin and Alexej von Jawlensky. Jawlensky once characterised the latter: "Yes, Jawlensky is already a human being! – He could be canonised."

=== World War I ===
From 1914 to 1918, Ehmsen was stationed as a soldier in the First World War in France, Romania and Flanders. His impressions from the years 1918 to 1919 during the conflicts and the disintegration of the Bavarian Soviet Republic are reflected in many of his works.

=== 1920s ===
In 1919, Ehmsen joined the November Group. In 1920, he applied for a residence permit at the Aliens Office at the Munich Police Headquarters for Werefkin, Jawlensky, Helene Nesnakomoff and Andreas Jawlensky which gave them the opportunity to dissolve their Munich flat.

On 24 March 1921, Ehmsen signed the guest book of Heinrich Kirchhoff in Wiesbaden as a painter residing in Munich.

In the summer of 1921, Jawlensky rented Ehmsen's flat in Munich and from there visited Paul Klee, who was then living in Possenhofen on Lake Starnberg. After an extended trip in 1928 to Martigues in southern France Ehmsen moved to Berlin in 1929.

=== 1930s ===
In 1930, he became a member of the Kampfkomitee der Künstler und Geistesarbeiter in support of the Communist Party of Germany in the Reichstag elections. From 1932 to 1933, he stayed in the USSR, where he had an exhibition in Moscow and his works were bought by museums.

Until his arrest by the Gestapo on 18 October 1933, Ehmsen was an artistic employee at Junkers-Werke. Friedrich Peter Drömmers had arranged the job for him. During his imprisonment in the Columbia concentration camp in Berlin, his works were removed from all German museums. Although eight works were shown in the 1937 exhibition Degenerate Art it came to be admitted to the Reich Chamber of Culture in 1939.

=== 1940s ===
From 1940 to 1944 he was a soldier in the Wehrmacht. He was employed in the propaganda department of the German military administration in occupied France during World War II, which received its instructions from the Reich Ministry for Popular Enlightenment and Propaganda and the MBF jointly. Lieutenant Ehmsen, responsible for visual arts, was a "comrade" of Lieutenant Gerhard Heller and organised with him the trip of French writers to the 1941 European Meeting of Poets. He organised a trip of French painters and sculptors to Germany in 1941, among them André Derain and Maurice de Vlaminck. However, the Breker exhibition in Paris was not organised by Ehmsen, but by Karl Epting and the Deutsches Institut.

=== After the Second World War ===
In 1945, Ehmsen – together with Karl Hofer – was one of the co-founders of the Berlin University of the Arts in Berlin-Charlottenburg, of which he was deputy director as well as head of the liberal arts department. Because of a declaration of solidarity for the Paris Congrès mondial des partisans pour la paix (World Peace Movement), he was dismissed in 1949. In 1950, Ehmsen became a full member of the Akademie der Künste der DDR and took over the master class for painting.

== Legacy ==
His estate is now held by the Academy of Arts, Berlin, and includes seven paintings.

== Awards ==
- 1961: Patriotic Order of Merit in Silver

== Work ==
- Erschießung, 1919
- Meine Kinder, 1922
- Radierungen zu Gerhart Hauptmann's novel Der Narr in Christo Emanuel Quint, 1927
- Der Angler von Cassis, 1930
- Erschießung des Matrosen Engelhofer, 1932–1933
- Harlekine des Krieges, 1945

== Works in public collections ==
- Stadtgalerie Kiel
- Academy of Arts, Berlin

== Exhibitions ==
- 1913: Galerie Der Sturm, Berlin, Erster Deutscher Herbstsalon, Gruppenausstellung
- 1913: Städtisches Museum Essen, Einzelausstellung unter dem Namen Heinz Ehmke.
- 1914: Wiener und Münchner Galerien, Holzschnitte
- 1920: Galerie Goltz, Munich, Einzelausstellung
- 1926: Kunstverein Wiesbaden, Graphic works together with Emil Nolde and Frans Masereel
- 1926: Kunsthalle Kiel, Holsteinische Künstler, Gruppenausstellung
- 1968: Staatliches Museum Schwerin, Gedächnisausstellung aus dem Nachlaß des Künstlers.
