= Lin May Saeed =

German-Iraqi contemporary artist (1973–2023)

- Born: 1973; Würzburg, Germany
- Died: 2023 (aged 49–50); Berlin, Germany
- Education: Kunstakademie Düsseldorf
- Known for: Sculpture, sculptural reliefs, drawings, works on paper, video
- Movement: Contemporary art
- Website: https://www.linmaysaeed.com/

Lin May Saeed (1973–2023) was a German-Iraqi contemporary artist known for sculpture, sculptural reliefs, drawings, works on paper, and video. Her practice focused on animal rights, environmental issues, and redefining human-animal relationships. She was distinguished by her use of unconventional materials such as styrofoam, which she “redeemed” artistically while acknowledging their ecological implications.

== Early life and education ==
Born in Würzburg in 1973 to an Iraqi father and German mother, Saeed was a longtime vegan and activist. She studied sculpture at the Kunstakademie Düsseldorf under Luise Kimme and Tony Cragg, graduating in 2001. It was during her time in Düsseldorf that she began her activism; later, while working in Berlin, she shared her studio with two rabbits.

== Career ==
Saeed’s estate is managed by Galerie Jacky Strenz, Frankfurt; her estate is also represented by Chris Sharp Gallery, Los Angeles. Her work has been featured in important exhibitions and venues including Manifesta 15, the 9th Berlin Biennale, Museum Frieder Burda, Palais de Tokyo, Studio Voltaire, Amsterdam Sculpture Biennale, Ljubljana Biennial of Graphic Arts, Castello di Rivoli, Aspen Art Museum, and the Clark Art Institute.

== Exhibitions ==
=== Solo exhibitions ===
- 2024 – Thinking Like a Mountain, GAMeC, Bergamo, Italy.
- 2023 – The Snow Falls Slowly in Paradise, Georg Kolbe Museum, Berlin, Germany; and Lin May Saeed in Dialogue with Renée Sintenis, same venue.
- 2021 – Solo shows at sipgate shows (Düsseldorf) and Rami, Galerie Jacky Strenz (Frankfurt).
- 2020 – Arrival of the Animals, Clark Art Institute, Williamstown, MA, USA; her first museum solo, presenting works in Styrofoam, paper, and steel. Accompanied by a monograph, with essays and a catalog exploring animality and speciesism.
- 2018 - Biene, Studio Voltaire, London, UK
- 2017 - Djamil, Lulu, Mexico City, MX

=== Group exhibitions ===
- 2024 – The Parliament of Marmots (Biennale Gherdëina, Urtijëi, Italy); Songs for the Changing Seasons (Vienna Climate Biennale); Balancing Conflicts (Manifesta 15, Barcelona); Three Tired Tigers (Jameel Arts Centre, Dubai); Für Alle! Demokratie neu gestalten (Bundeskunsthalle, Bonn); Actual Fractals, Act II (Sculpture Milwaukee, WI)
- 2023 – Jochen Lempert and Lin May Saeed (Chris Sharp Gallery, LA)
- 2022 – Extase de l’abîme (Le Quai, France); We Belong To Each Other (Carlier Gebauer, Berlin).
- 2021 – Eurasia – A Landscape of Mutability (M HKA, Antwerp); Amsterdam Sculpture Biennale, La Mer Imaginaire / Imaginary Sea (Fondation Carmignac); Espressioni (Castello di Rivoli).
- 2020 – Crack Up - Crack Down (Ujazdowski Castle CCA, Warsaw); El oro de los tigres / The Gold of the Tigers (Air de Paris); Winterfest (Aspen Art Museum).
- 2019 - City Prince/sses, Palais de Tokyo, Paris, FR
- 2018 - Metamorphosis, C: Chus Martínez, Museo Castello di Rivoli, Turino, IT
- 2016 - 9th Berlin Biennale for Contemporary Art, Akademie der Künste Berlin, Berlin, DE

== Themes and influences ==
Saeed’s work questioned anthropocentrism and proposed interspecies empathy, drawing iconography from ancient Middle Eastern, Egyptian, and Greco-Roman sources. Her use of discarded Styrofoam symbolized environmental degradation and the overlooked fragility of animal life. She once described her choice of Styrofoam: “a material that reveals human fallibility.”

== Death ==
Saeed died of brain cancer in 2023, aged 50.
