= Hermann Stiller =

German architect

Hermann Stiller (29 November 1850 – 1931) was a German architect and director of the Kunstgewerbeschule Düsseldorf.

== Life ==
Born Gostyń, Stiller studied at the Bauakademie and was there, among other things, a pupil of Friedrich Adler. He received the State Prize of the Academy in 1875 – presumably for his Entwurf zu einer Kunst-Academie. He used the associated bonus for a study trip to Italy in 1876/77. Between 1878 and 1880, he worked under Wilhelm von Mörner on the planning and execution of the new building for the Reichsjustizamt in Berlin, Voßstraße 4/5. He then took part in the recording of the excavations in Pergamon, where he worked on the Trajaneum. In 1882, he became director of the Kunsthochschule Kassel, and from 1884 to 1903, he was the first director of the newly founded Kunstgewerbeschule Düsseldorf. He then settled in Cologne as an independent architect.

Stiller was a member of the Architekten- und Ingenieurverein Düsseldorf, where he served as chairman in 1893 and at times served as Vice-Chairman. After moving to Cologne, he transferred to the local Architekten und Ingenieur-Verein für Niederrhein und Westfalen. He became a member of the Bund Deutscher Architekten (BDA), and the local group of the BDA in Cologne later appointed him an honorary member.

Stiller was married to Erminia née Bumiller. Their common daughter Maria married the composer and conductor Rudolf Siegel and was the mother of the composer Ralph Maria Siegel.

== Work ==
=== Buildings and drafts ===
His constructions include various buildings for Reichsbank branches, especially in the Rhine Province:

- 1892–1894: Reichsbankgebäude Düsseldorf, Heinrich-Heine-Allee 8/9
- 1896–1897: Reichsbank-Stelle Mülheim, Kaiserstraße 20
- 1897: Reichsbank-Stelle Duisburg, Düsseldorfer Straße 21.
- 1900–1902: Reichsbank-Nebenstelle Uerdingen, Niederstraße 24
- 1902–1904: Reichsbank-Nebenstelle Barmen, Neuer Weg 594/596
- 1903–1905: Reichsbank-Nebenstelle Viersen, Poststraße 8
- 1904–1906: Reichsbank-Stelle Krefeld, Friedrichsplatz 20
- 1905–1907: Reichsbank-Nebenstelle Rüdesheim, Geisenheimer Straße 17
- 1908–1910: Reichsbank-Nebenstelle Kleve, Klosterstraße 12/14
- 1909–1910: Reichsbank-Nebenstelle Moers, Landwehrstraße 6
- 1910–1911: Reichsbank-Nebenstelle Mettmann, Bahnstraße 55

Beyond his work for the Reichsbank, other bank buildings by Stiller are known to date.

- 1895: Competition design for the Ruhmeshalle in Barmen (motto "Hya Berge romeryke", awarded with a 3rd prize)
- 1900: Bank building for the Bergisch-Märkische Bank in Duisburg, Claubergstraße 11;
- 1901–1902: Bank building for the Bergisch-Märkische Bank AG in Krefeld, Ostwall 131–135 (today Deutsche Bank).
- 1910–1912: Bankgebäude für die Kreissparkasse Moers, Goethestraße (with Hermann Eberhard Pflaume).

== Publications ==
- Hermann Stiller (1880). Alexander Conze (ed.). Die Ergebnisse der Ausgrabungen zu Pergamon. Berlin: Weidmannsche Buchhandlung. pp. 87–95.
- Das Traianeum. (Altertümer von Pergamon. Vol. 5, 2.) de Gruyter, Berlin 1895 (uni-heidelberg.de).
