= Ernesto de Fiori =

German sculptor (1884–1945)

- Born: 12 December 1884; Rome, Italy
- Died: 24 April 1945 (aged 60); São Paulo, Brazil
- Occupation: Sculptor

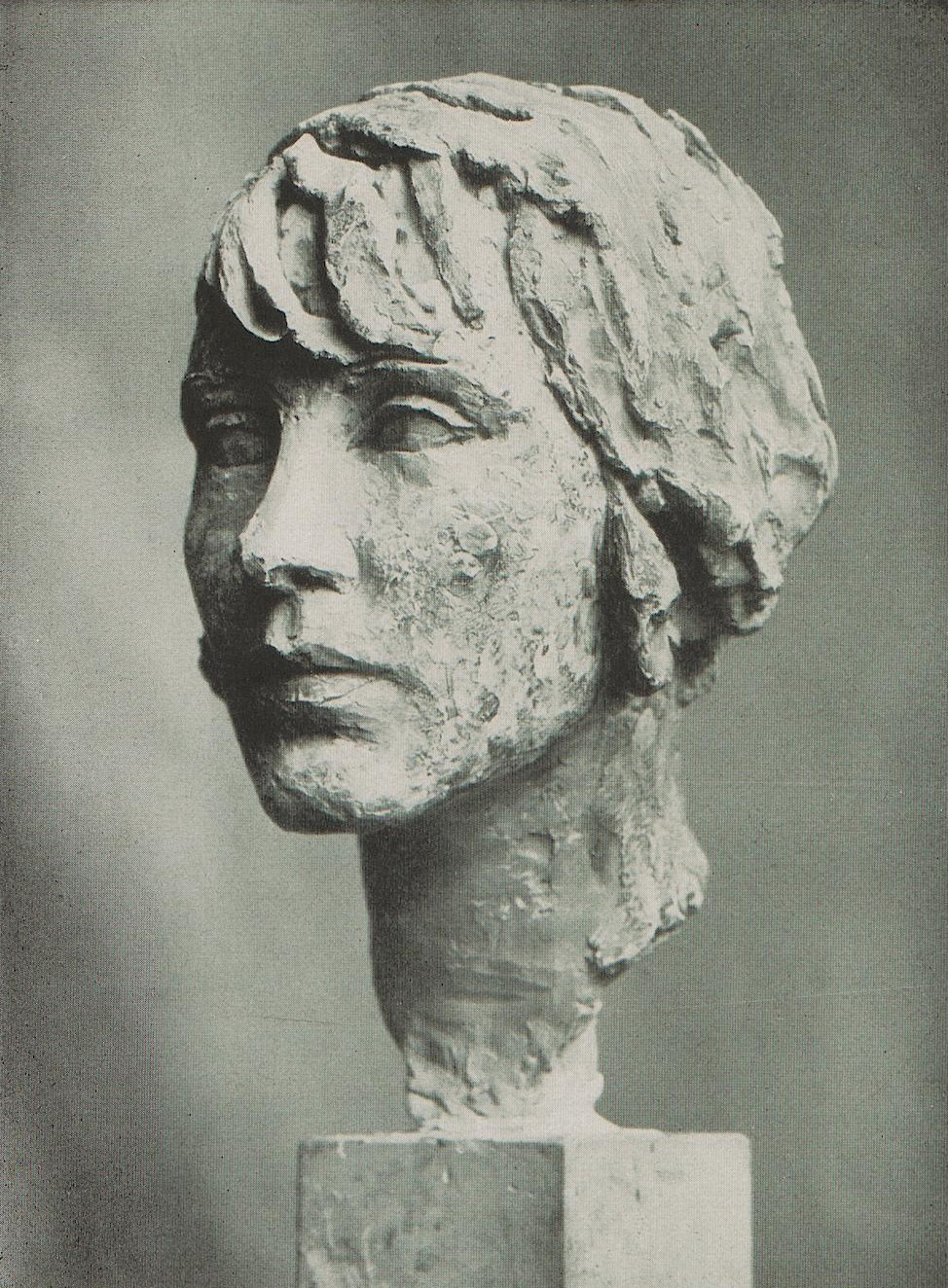
"Portrait of a Young Woman", 1929 (whereabouts unknown)

Ernesto de Fiori (12 December 1884 – 24 April 1945) was a German painter and sculptor of Italian and Austrian descent. A dazzling personality himself, he rose to fame as a society portraitist and a major protagonist of Berlin's vivid art scene during the Weimar Republic. One of the many artists defamed as "degenerate" by the Nazis in 1937, de Fiori emigrated to Brazil where he died in 1945.

== Life ==
Ernesto de Fiori was born in Rome to an Austrian mother and an ethnic Italian father from Istria (then part of Austria-Hungary) who worked as a correspondent for a Viennese newspaper in Rome.

De Fiori grew up in Rome and went to Munich to study painting at the Academy of Fine Arts with Gabriel von Hackl from 1903 to 1905. The young artist did not pursue his studies very seriously and never obtained a degree. He returned to Rome in 1905 to further develop his painting before embarking on extensive travels that eventually brought him back to Germany in the late 1900s. Back in Munich a long-term friendship developed with writer Carl Sternheim and his wife Thea who admired and supported the young artist in his formative years.

From 1911 to 1914, de Fiori lived and worked in Paris and associated with the German speaking artists and intellectuals living there and gathering in the legendary Café du Dôme, among others Swiss sculptor Hermann Haller, German painters Karl Hofer and Heinrich Ehmsen and sculptor Wilhelm Lehmbruck. De Fiori temporarily quit painting and became a sculptor. His works were first exhibited in 1912 at the "International Art Exhibition of the Sonderbund" in Cologne.

During the First World War he was suspected of spying for Germany and briefly imprisoned in France in 1915. In 1915 he returned to Germany, took German citizenship and was a soldier until 1917.

De Fiori moved to Zürich in 1917 and lived there until 1920. In 1921 he moved to Berlin and together with Swiss sculptors Hermann Haller and Fritz Huf moved into the abandoned studio of Louis Tuaillon, who had died two years previously.

During Berlin's so called Golden Twenties Ernesto de Fiori rose to fame as a sculptural portraitist in Berlin. Renowned Jewish gallery owner Alfred Flechtheim who had already met de Fiori in Paris became aware of the artist's potential, introduced him to Berlin's high society and promoted him for several years as one of the leading artists in his gallery. De Fiori portrayed film divas Greta Garbo and Marlene Dietrich, boxing champion Jack Dempsey and field marshal Paul von Hindenburg among many others.

When Flechtheim was exposed to the racist agitation of the National Socialists in the early 1930s and was forced to emigrate after the Nazi's "seizure of control", de Fiori's star also began to decline.

However, the artist was still tolerated in Germany at the time and took part, for the second time after the 1928 Summer Olympics, at the art competition at the 1936 Summer Olympics.

In 1936 he traveled to Brazil to pay a visit to family members living there. He portrayed Italian poet Giuseppe Ungaretti, who was about to accept a chair in Italian language and literature at the University of São Paulo and persuaded de Fiori to follow him there.

In Brazil, de Fiori as an artist of European modernism immediately received great attention. He also wrote articles for Italian and German émigré magazines.

In 1937, during the Nazi campaign "Degenerate Art", several of de Fiori’s artworks were removed from German museums and art galleries. In Brazil he focused on painting and created only a few sculptures. He lived and worked in São Paulo until his death on April 24, 1945.

Italian curator Pietro Maria Bardi, who had spent time in Brazil in the 1930s and 1940s and moved to São Paulo for good in 1946, played an important role in the posthumous promotion of the artist’s oeuvre in Brazil, but also in Italy. Bardi curated a large retrospective for the Hoepli Gallery in 1950 and included works of the artist in the collection of the São Paulo Museum of Art of which he was the Founding Director.

In Germany, the Georg-Kolbe-Museum in Berlin has taken on the task of preserving the memory of de Fiori as a sculptor since the 1980s. In 1992 the museum mounted a large retrospective accompanied by the publication of an extensive catalogue of works.

== Influences and style ==
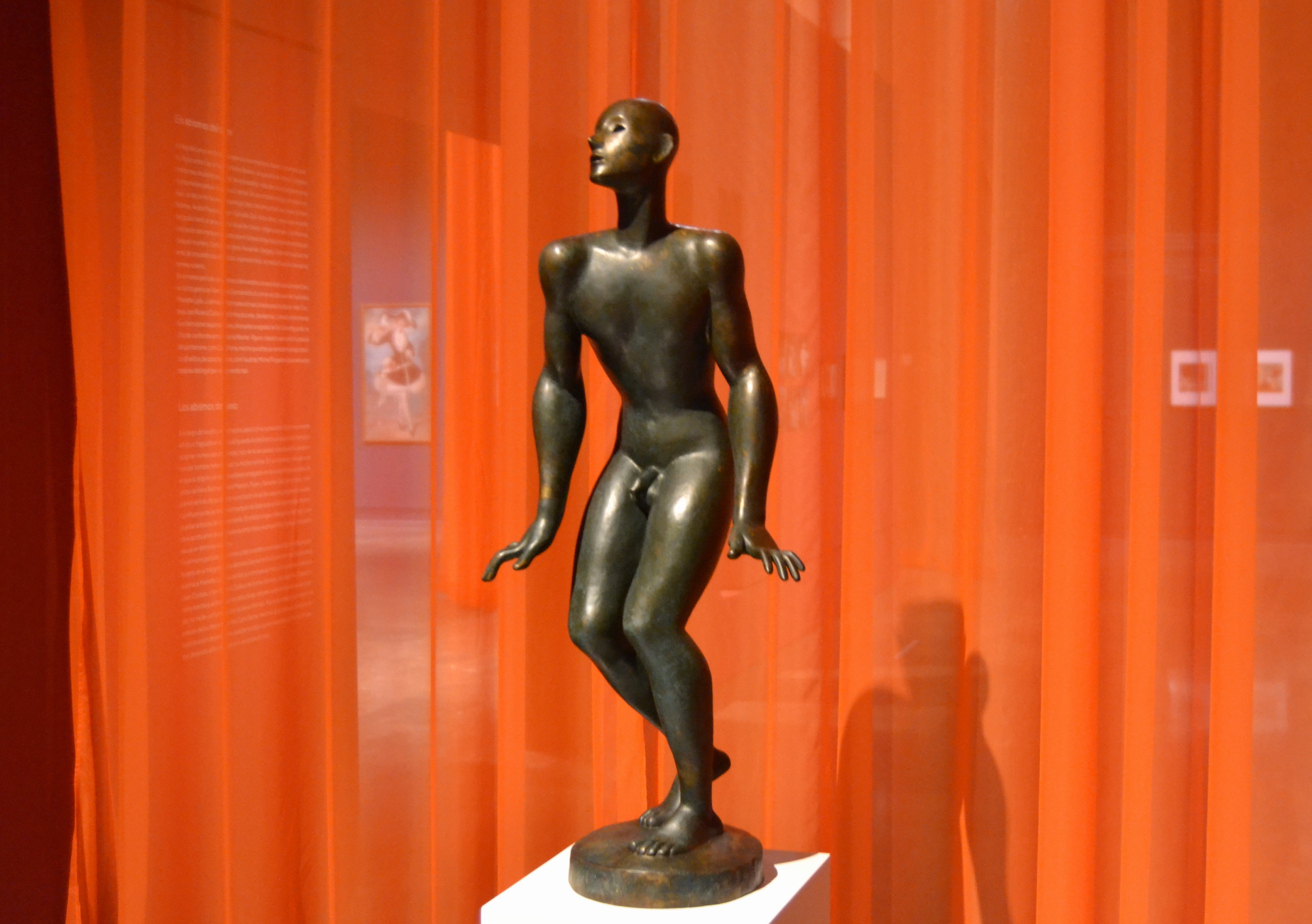
"Jüngling (Nijinski)", 1914

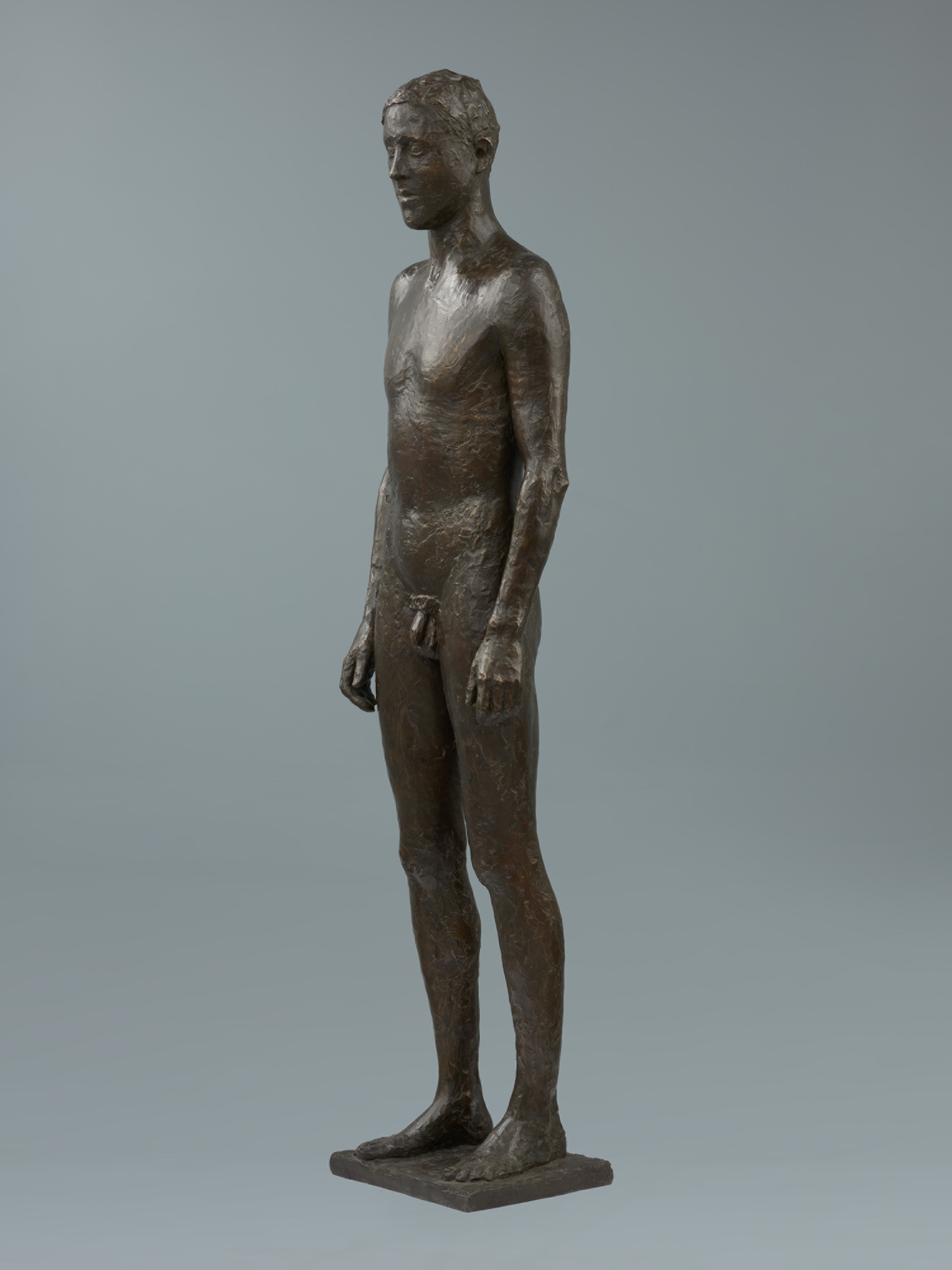
Grosser Juengling I, 1926. National Museum in Szczecin

Throughout his life, Ernesto de Fiori, who considered himself a cosmopolitan European and was self-taught as a sculptor, denied any affiliations to groups, schools and -isms. On the one hand, as a figurative sculptor, he was very keen not to be taken for a traditionalist, on the other hand he polemicized against Dadaism and abstract painting and rejected Expressionism.

However, French influences seem particularly strong in the artist’s oeuvre. Alfred Kuhn, a German art historian who analyzed De Fiori’s development as early as 1922, considered Aristide Maillol the most impactful influence on the artist. According to Kuhn, de Fiori was in search of "the great form", a strictly tectonic sculptural form ideally represented by Maillol’s work of the time.

In Paris, during his formative years 1911 to 1914, de Fiori studied Maillol, Despiau and Rodin as well as younger contemporaries like Brancusi. Rodin’s impressionist treatment of surfaces may have left marks in the „haptic“ nature of de Fiori’s mature work of the 1920s and 30s: Working in clay, de Fiori modeled quickly using only his fingers, commissioned portraits were sometimes finished and ready to cast in a couple of hours.

This dual orientation of the sculptor – a tectonic approach on the one hand, and a more spontaneous "haptic" approach on the other hand – is also reflected in the choice of materials in which de Fiori had his works cast: while he preferred bronze to cast full-figure works, the much less filigree busts and heads were for the most part cast in stucco with its completely different character in terms of materiality.

According to German sculptor and art historian Waldemar Grzimek, de Fiori's sculptural oeuvre is also rooted in the German tradition represented by Adolf von Hildebrand. However, Grzimek also acknowledges that the artistic maturation of the self-taught painter-sculptor essentially took place during his Paris years 1911 to 1914. De Fiori himself self-consciously denied German influences in his sculpture: "On the contrary, the German school was influenced by me and artists like Lehmbruck, Kolbe and Sintenis." Two of the three artists mentioned here had been living in Paris before the war broke out in 1914.

Indeed, de Fiori’s early works show a stylistic relationship with the work of Georg Kolbe, an elder by a few years, however, the imparting of practical knowledge through long-time studio colleague and artistic companion Hermann Haller, whom de Fiori closely associated with in Paris and later in Zürich and in Berlin, has to be considered more impactful. Characteristically, Haller, just like de Fiori, had initially wanted to become a painter and was an autodidact as a sculptor.

In the Italian reception of de Fiori's art, questions of artistic temperament, of origin and affiliation, in particular the question of the oeuvre’s "italianitá", also played an important role. In the mid 1920s, the artist had cautiously approached the Novecento Italiano and even participated in the group’s first exhibition in 1926, but subsequently rejected all attempts of appropriation, on one occasion notably at the instigation of his Berlin mentor Alfred Flechtheim. If Italian influences were decisive for de Fiori's development, they seem difficult to verify, since the artist never stayed long in Italy in his adult life.

== Works ==
=== Sculptures ===
- Jüngling, 1911 (Kunsthalle Mannheim)
- Ursula, 1912 (whereabouts unknown, formerly Collection Flechtheim)
- Jüngling (Nijinski), 1914 (private collection)
- Badende, 1917 (Berlinische Galerie)
- Mann, 1918 (Hamburger Kunsthalle)
- Kniende, 1922 (Museum der bildenden Künste, Leipzig)
- Selbstportrait, 1926 (Wilhelm-Lehmbruck-Museum, Duisburg)
- Engländerin, 1924 (Georg-Kolbe-Museum, Berlin)
- Bildnis Jack Dempsey , 1925 (Austrian National Gallery, Vienna)
- Junge Frau, around 1928 (Landesmuseum Oldenburg)
- Der Boxer Max Schmeling, 1928 (National Gallery Berlin)
- Bildnis Reichspräsident Hindenburg, 1928 (Kunstmuseum Düsseldorf)
- Bildnis Marlene Dietrich, 1931 (National Gallery Berlin)
- Selbstbildnis, 1933 (Berlinische Galerie)
- Selbstbildnis, 1945 (São Paulo Museum of Art)

== Literature ==
- Beatrice Vierneisel: Ernesto de Fiori. Das plastische Werk 1911-1936.. Dietrich Reimer Verlag, Berlin 1992, ISBN 3-496-01091-6 (Catalogue Raisonnée of de Fiori's oeuvre as a sculptor, text in German language)
- Pietro Maria Bardi: Ernesto de Fiori. Ulrico Hoepli editore, Milano 1950 (Catalogue of a retrospective, text in Italian language)
- Ernesto de Fiori. Uma Retrospectiva: pintura, desenho e escultura. Curadoria Mayra Laudanna. Sao Paulo: Pinacoteca do Estado 1997 (Exhibition catalogue in Portuguese language)
- Waldemar Grzimek: Deutsche Bildhauer des Zwanzigsten Jahrhunderts. Leben, Schulen, Wirkungen. R.-Löwit-Verlag, Wiesbaden, 1969. (German language publication on 20th century sculpture in Germany, chapter on de Fiori pp. 135–142)
- Alfred Kuhn: Die neuere Plastik. Von 1800 bis zur Gegenwart. Delphin-Verlag, München 1922. (German language publication on 19th and 20th century sculpture in Europe, chapter on Maillol and de Fiori pp. 89–105)
