= Albert Herzfeld =

German painter

Albert Herzfeld (Düsseldorf, 1865 – Theresienstadt, 1943) was a noted German Jewish painter who was deported at the age of 77 to Theresienstadt and died there the following year. His diaries from 1935 to 1939 provide a detailed source of information on the worsening situation of Düsseldorf's Jewish community.
