= Georg Kolbe =

German sculptor

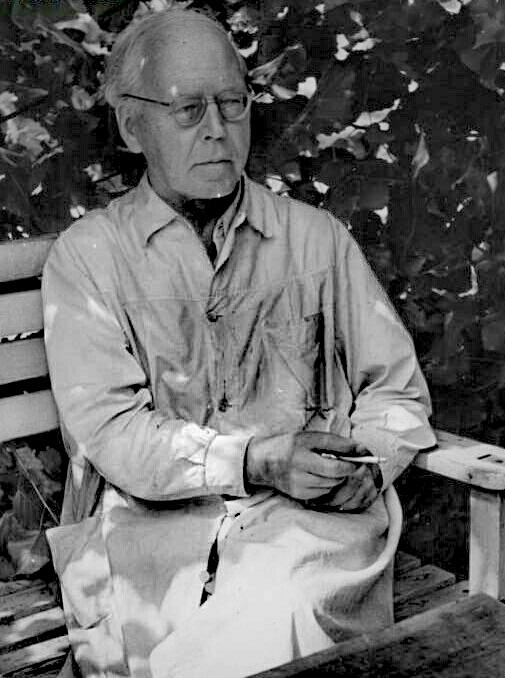
Georg Kolbe

Georg Kolbe (15 April 1877 – 20 November 1947) was a German sculptor. He was the leading German figure sculptor of his generation, in a vigorous, modern, simplified classical style similar to Aristide Maillol of France.

== Early life and education ==
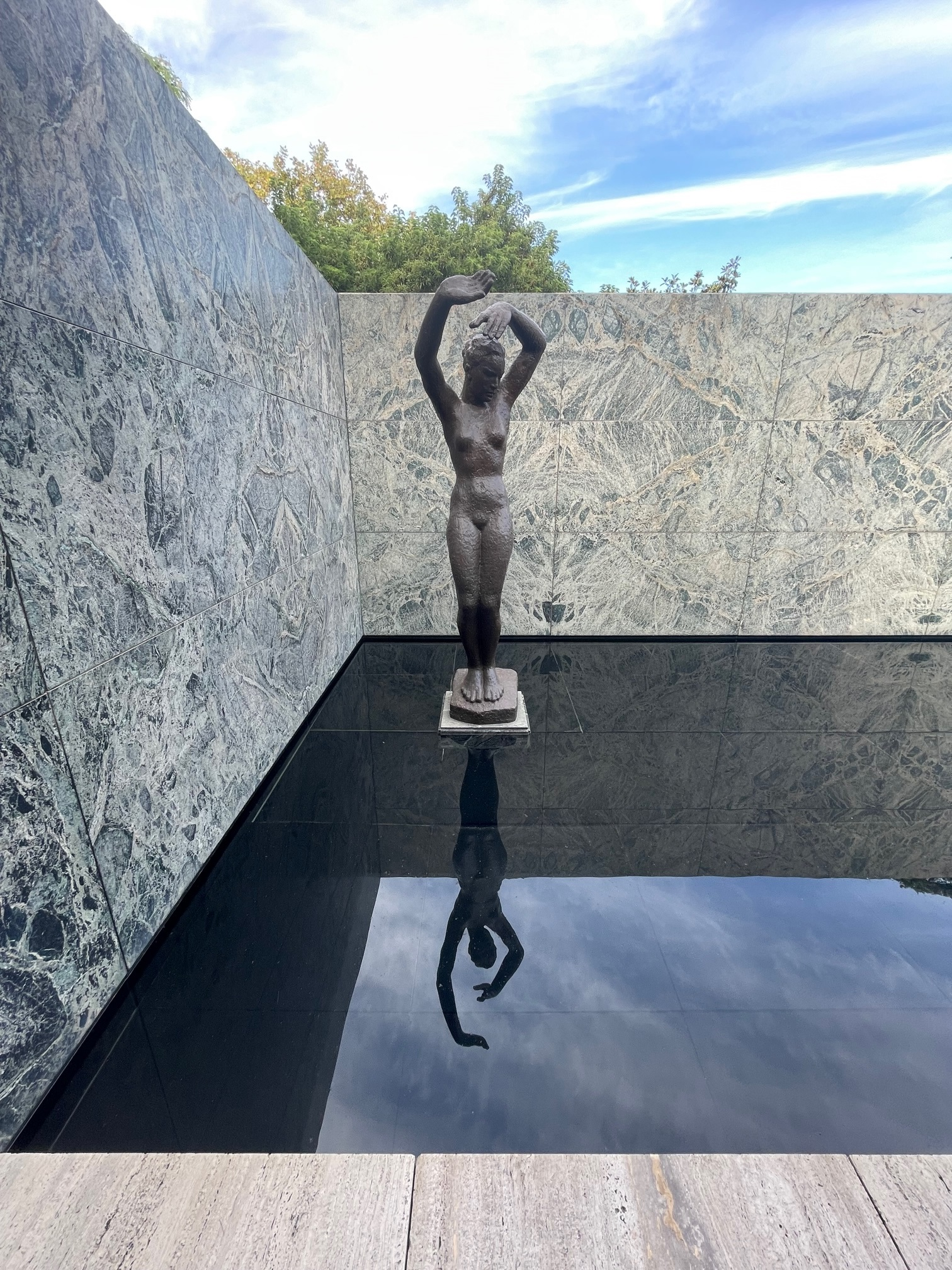
Dawn (Der Morgen) photographed in situ at the reconstructed Barcelona Pavilion

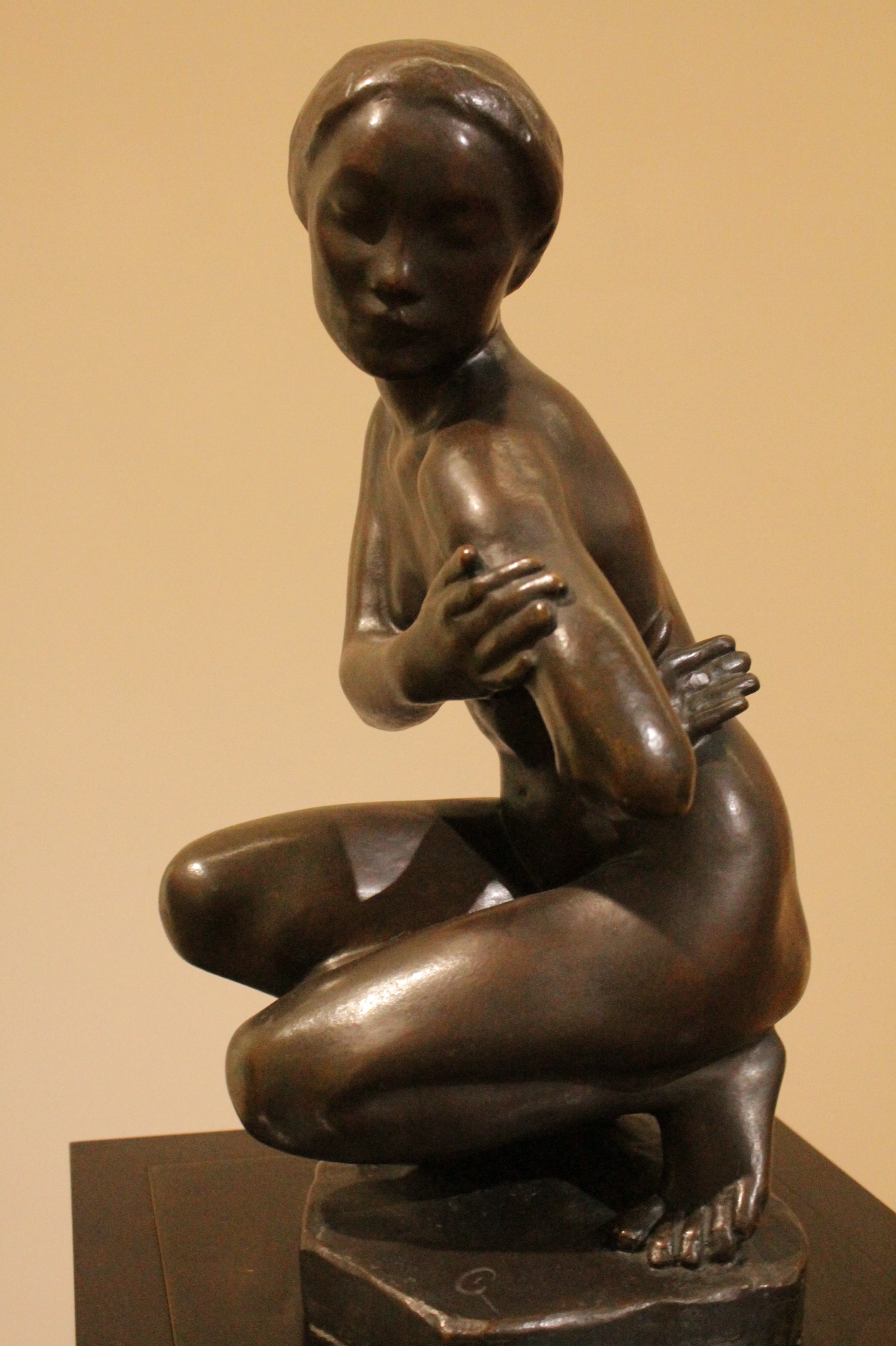
Crouching Japanese Woman (1911) Albertinum, Dresden

Kolbe was born in Waldheim, Saxony. Originally trained as a painter in Dresden, Munich, and Paris, he began sculpting during a stay in Rome at the turn of the century under the technical guidance of sculptor Louis Tuaillon.

== Career ==
In 1905, Kolbe joined the 'Berliner Sezession', which in 1913, he left to join the 'Freie Sezession'. His artistic breakthrough came in 1912 with his sculpture masterpiece "Die Tänzerin", his most famous work. As he was very interested in Asian faces, D. N. Mazumdar, father of Indian novelist Anita Desai, sat for him, resulting in a bust and a torso. In 1929, he also collaborated with Lilly Reich and Mies van der Rohe for his sculpture in the Barcelona Pavilion; Mies placed Kolbe's Alba (Dawn) in a small water basin. As the last president of the Deutscher Künstlerbund, he devoted himself to the promotion of fellow artists who were classified as "degenerate".

Kolbe also made ninety-nine prints, beginning with lithographs around 1900, primarily literary illustrations. In 1919–1920, Kolbe practically did not work as a sculptor. During this time small-size sculptures and drawings became central in his works. In the 1920s, encouraged by Cassirer, he made drypoints of dancers and nudes in motion, subjects he favored in his sculpture. His work was part of the sculpture event in the art competition at the 1928 Summer Olympics.

Kolbe executed important commissions throughout his long career, including many for the National Socialists during the last 15 years of his life, even requesting to make a bust of Hitler though this request was denied. The Nazis appropriated his late style of monumental, idealized athletic nudes. From 1937 to 1944, Kolbe participated regularly at the Große Deutsche Kunstausstellung, organized by the Haus der Kunst, Munich. His uncharacteristically bombastic Verkündigung (Proclamation) (1924) was a focal point of the 1937 German Pavilion. Commissioned by the German-Spanish economic organization Hisma in 1939, Kolbe created a portrait bust of the Spanish dictator Francisco Franco, which was given to Hitler as a birthday present the same year. In 1944, in the final stages of World War II, Hitler and Joseph Goebbels included Kolbe in the Gottbegnadeten list of the twelve most important visual artists. Only after Kolbe's death, a Beethoven monument (1926−47) and the Ring der Statuen were installed in Frankfurt am Main. The realization of a Friedrich Nietzsche memorial in Weimar failed because of Hitler's appeal.

Kolbe died of bladder cancer in St. Hedwig-Krankenhaus in Berlin on 20 November 1947.

== Exhibitions ==
In 2009, an exhibition of Kolbe's Blue Ink Drawings was presented by the State Hermitage Museum, in St Petersburg. In 2017 an exhibition about his artistic, architectural and social network yook place at the Georg Kolbe Museum, in Berlin.

== Collections ==
Many of Kolbe's 1000 sculptures were destroyed by confiscation, bombing and melting for war purposes. His sculptures are included in many museum collections in Europe, the USA and Russia, among them the Museum of Modern Art, New York, and the Moderna Museet, Stockholm.

== Public sculptures ==
- 1912 Die Bachnymphe, Bonn-Bad Godesberg, Redoutenpark
- 1913 Monument for Heinrich Heine, Westend, Frankfurt am Main
- 1917/1918 Monument in Tarabya, Istanbul, Turkey
- 1924 Verkündigung, Bürgergärten, Lübeck
- 1925 Der Morgen and Der Abend, Ceciliengärten, Berlin
- 1926 Kriegerdenkmal 1914–1918, Buchschlag near Frankfurt am Main
- 1926–1947 Beethoven-Denkmal, Frankfurt am Main
- 1927 Kriechende, Stadtpark, Hamburg
- 1928 Fliegender Genius, Ludwigshafen
- 1930 Rathenau-Brunnen, Volkspark Rehberge, Berlin
- 1931-1933 Aufsteigender Jüngling, Düsseldorf
- 1933, 1935 Zehnkämpfer and Ruhender Athlet, Olympic Stadium, Berlin
- 1936 Großer Wächter, Lüdenscheid

== Legacy ==
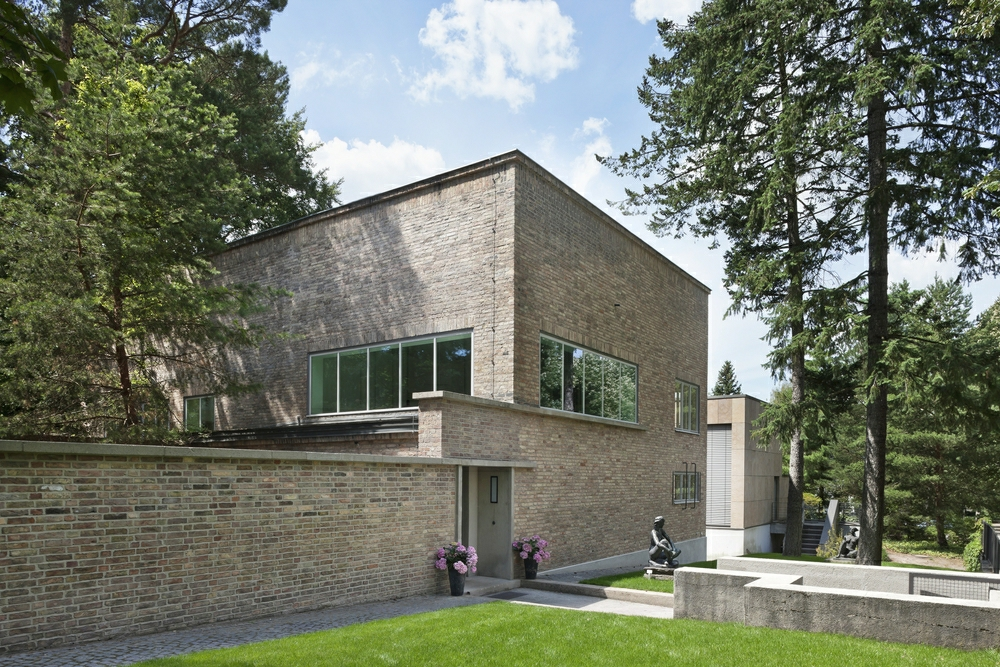
Modern Architecture in Berlin from 1928/29, Bildarchiv GKM, Photo Duch

The studio where Kolbe lived and worked from 1929 to 1947 is located in Berlin-Westend, in Sensburger Allee. It was built in 1928/29 based on Kolbe's designs by architect Ernst Rentsch (and architect Paul Linder) and borders on a sculpture garden. Today it serves as the Georg Kolbe Museum, a museum dedicated to sculpture of the 20th century and contemporary art.

Among others, the museum has in the past mounted solo exhibitions of Ernesto de Fiori (1992), Aristide Maillol (1996), Bernhard Hoetger (1998), Henry Moore (1998), Karl Hartung (1998), August Gaul (1999), A.R. Penck (2000), Wilhelm Lehmbruck (2000), Gerson Fehrenbach (2000), Bernhard Heiliger (2000–2001), Wilhelm Loth (2002), Michael Croissant (2003), David Nash (2004), Wieland Förster (2005), Hermann Blumenthal (2006), Max Klinger (2007), Antony Gormley (2007), Johannes Grützke (2007–2008), Otto Herbert Hajek (2008), Ah Xian (2008), Anton Henning (2009), Renée Sintenis (2013/2014), Ruprecht von Kaufmann (2014), Vanitas (with Alicja Kwade, Lucca Trevisani, Dieter Roth, Tomas Saraceno, Thomas Schütte and Pawel Althamer) 2014, Jean Arp - The Navel of the Avant-Garde (2015), Auguste Rodin and Madame Hanako (2016).

== Awards ==
- 1905 Villa Romana prize

== Gallery ==
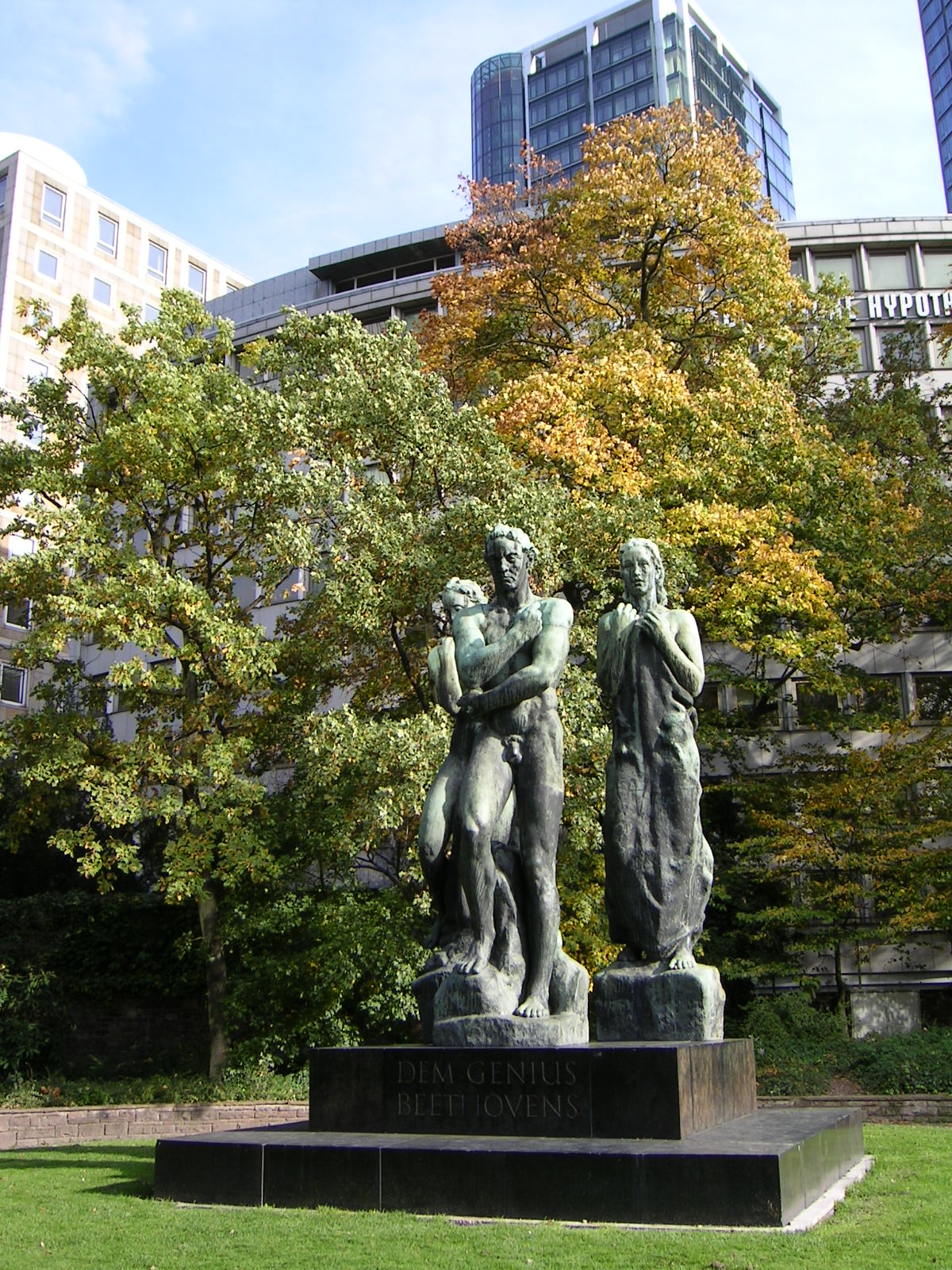
Monument dedicated to the genius of Ludwig van Beethoven, Frankfurt

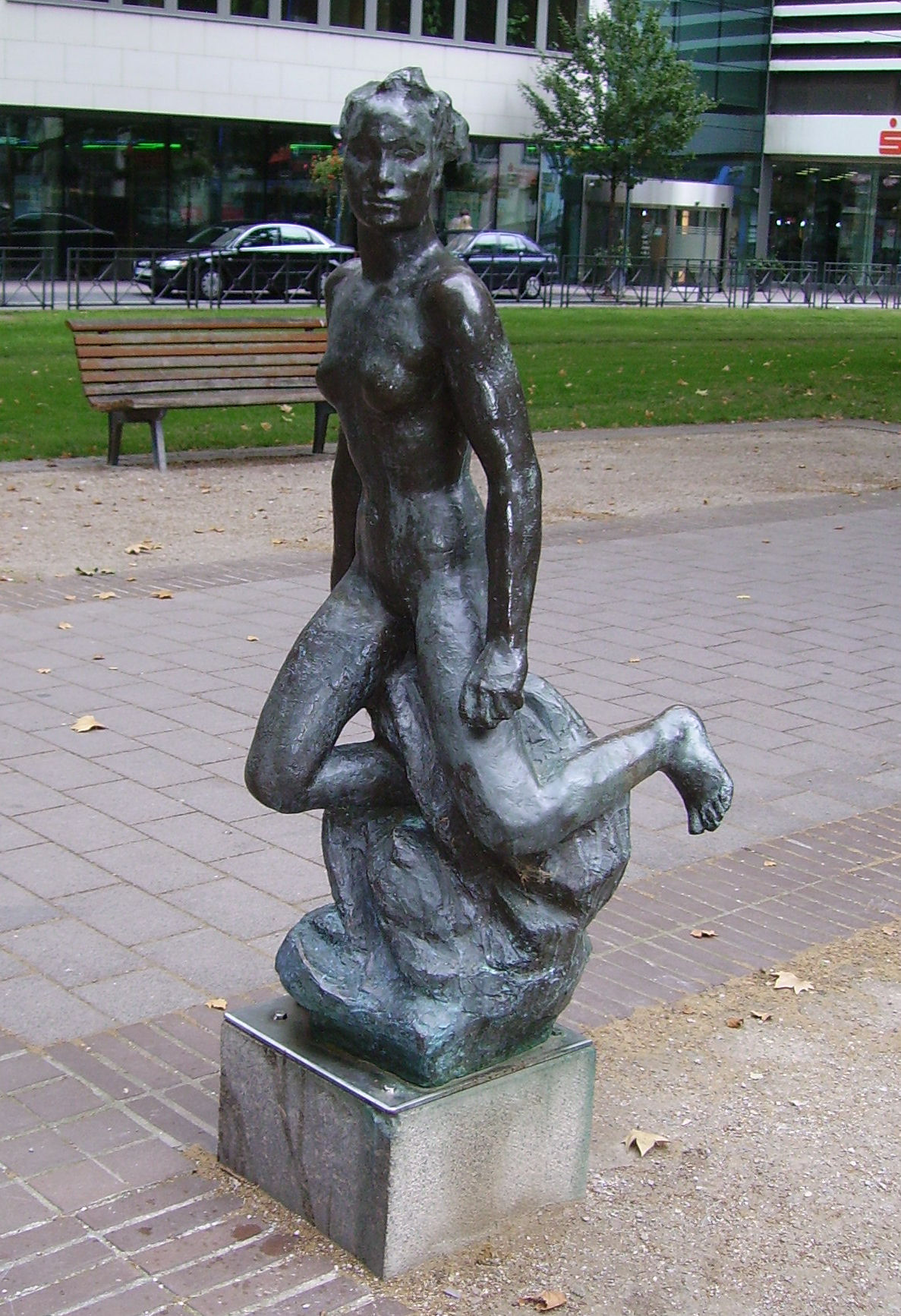
Fliegender Genius (Flying Genius) in the German City of Ludwigshafen

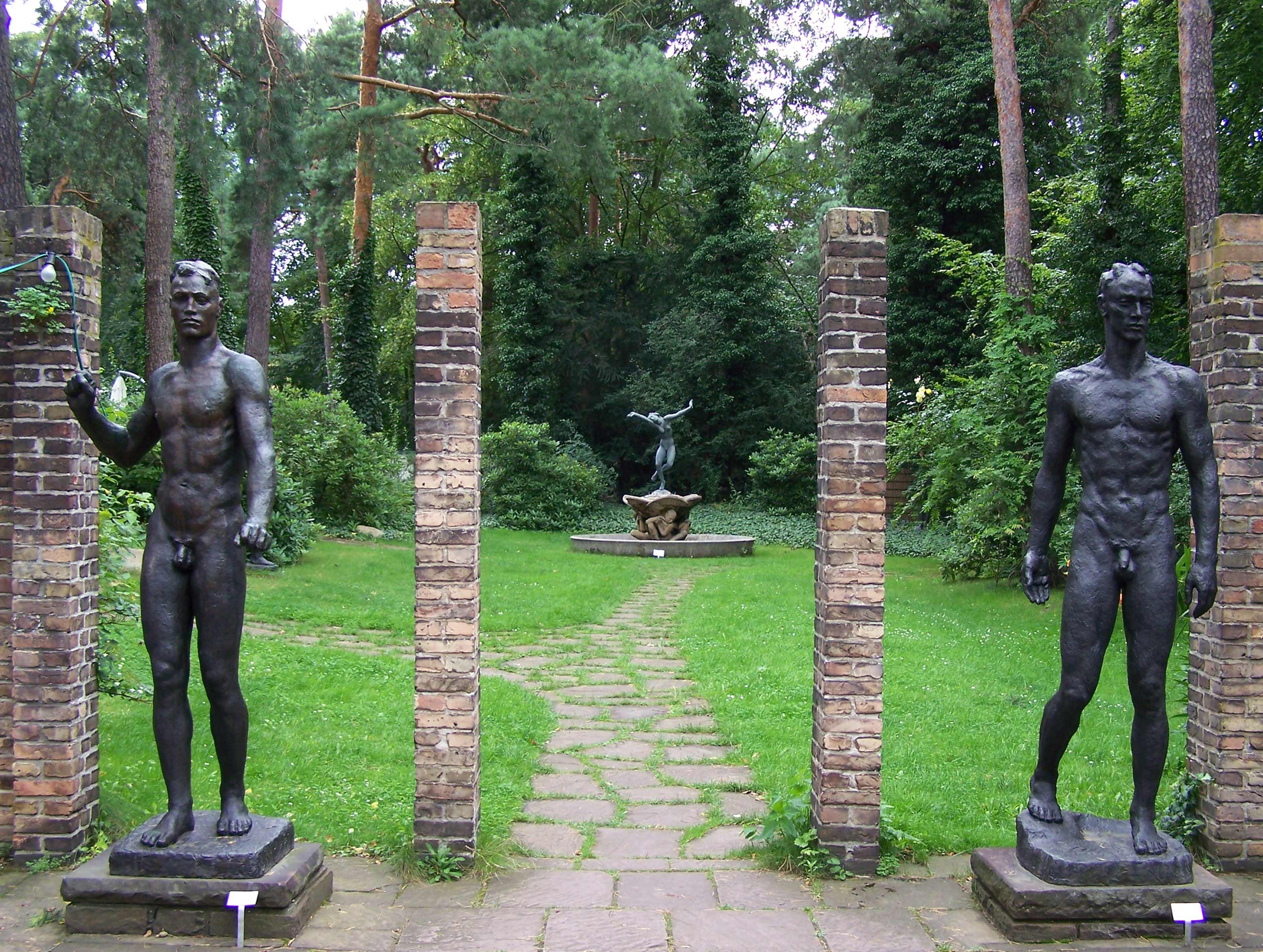
Statues in the garden of the Kolbe-Museum, Berlin

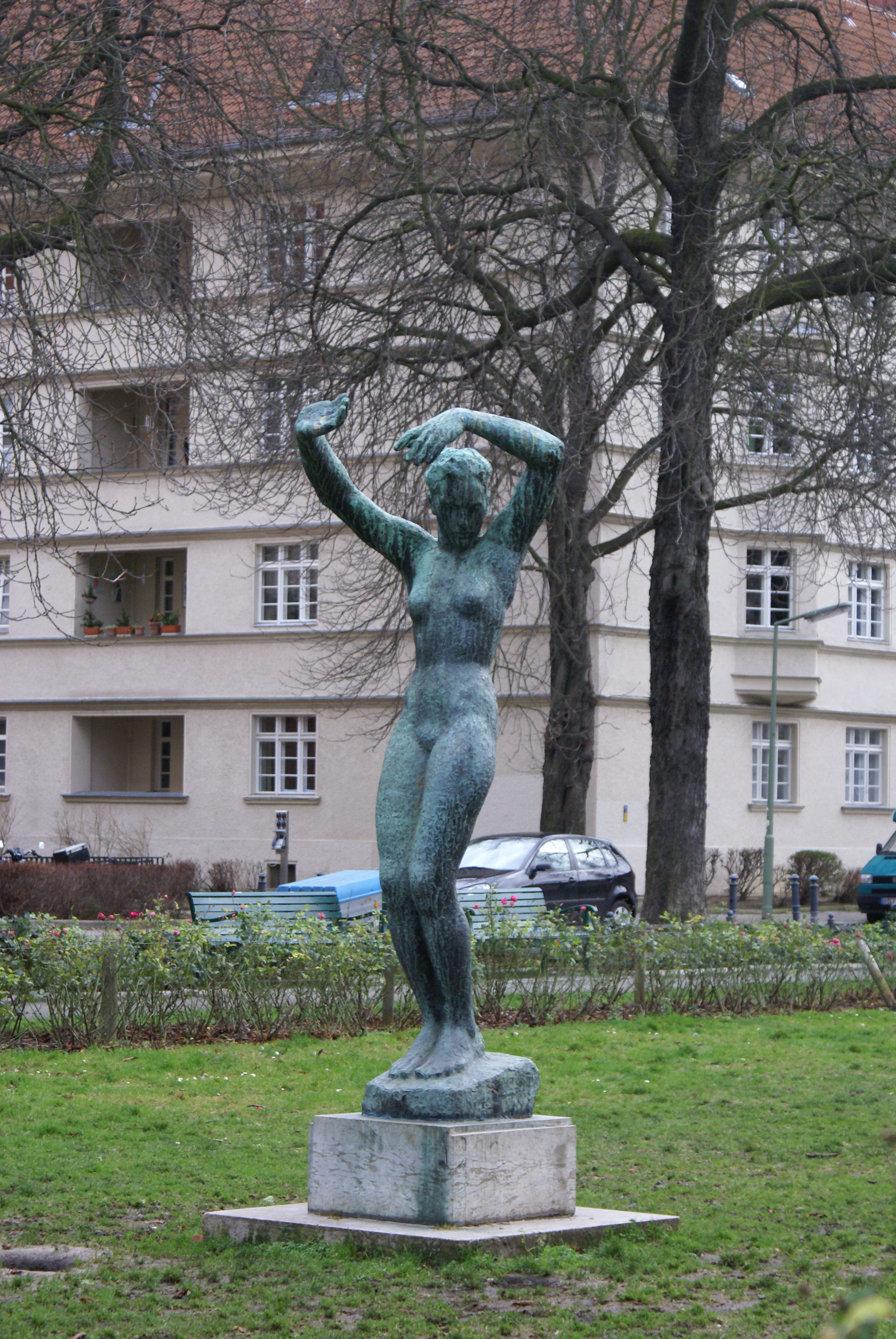
Der Morgen (Morning) in Berlin-Schöneberg

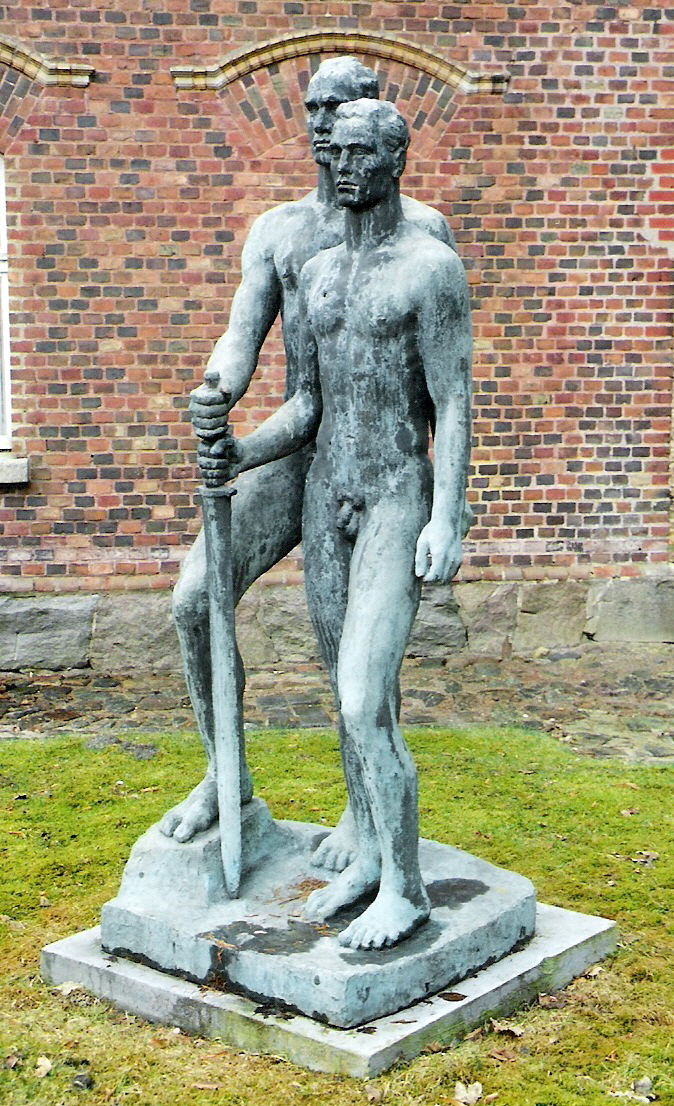
1914-1918 You have not died in vain in Stralsund (1935)

Painting: Die Goldene Insel (The Golden Isle) at the Alte Nationalgalerie, Berlin. (1898)

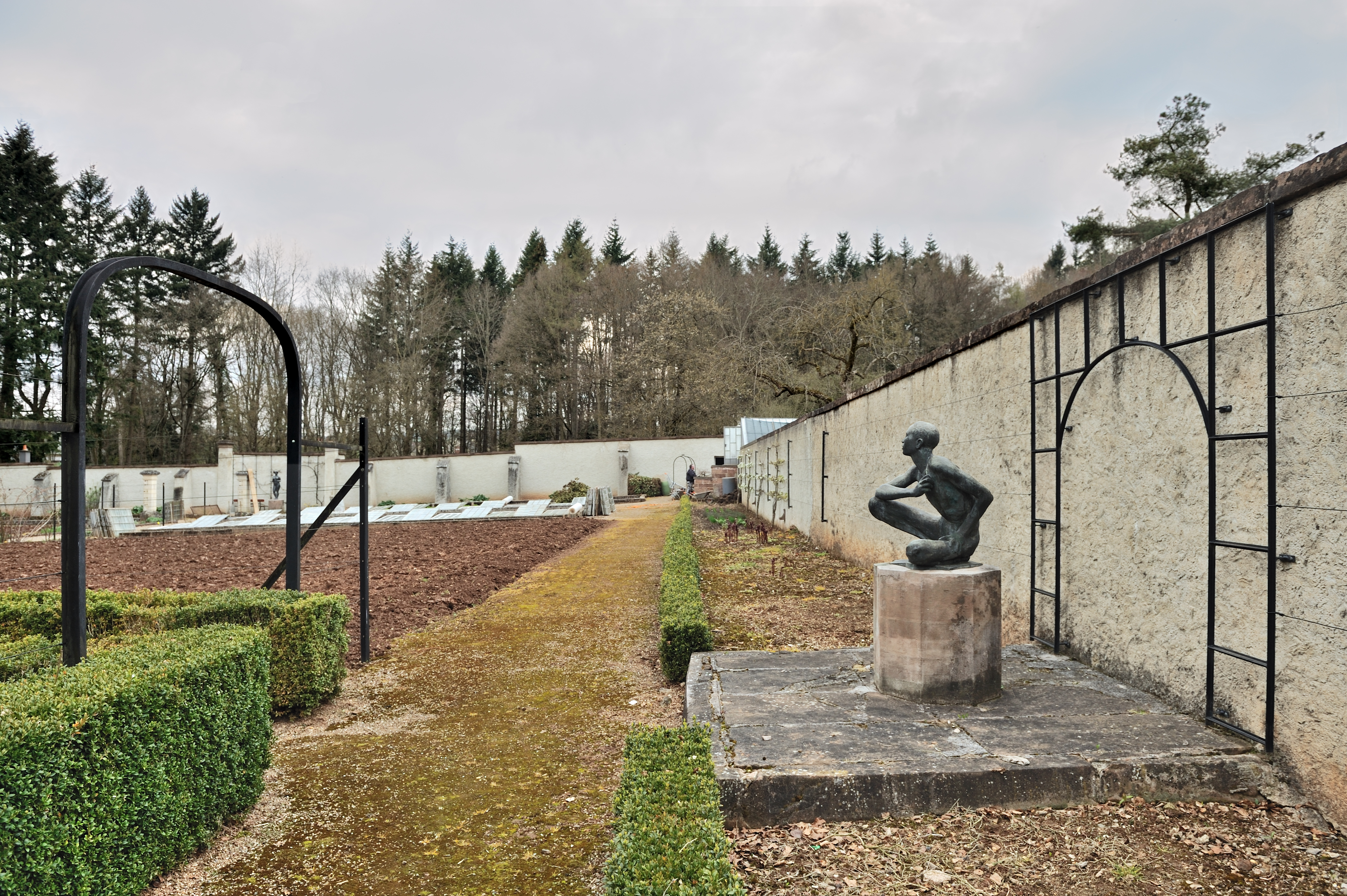
Sculpture: Jeune Somali at Colpach Castle in Luxembourg
