= German trawler V 409 August Bösch =

German fishing trawler used as a Vorpostenboot

History
- Name: August Bösch
- Owner: C. C. H. Bösch (1934–39); Kriegsmarine (1939–44)
- Port of registry: (Nazi Germany) Bremerhaven, Germany (1934–39); Kriegsmarine (1939–44)
- Builder: H. C. Stülcken Sohn
- Yard number: 689
- Launched: 8 June 1934
- Completed: 10 August 1934
- Commissioned: 25 September 1939
- Out of service: 20 August 1944
- Identification: Code Letters DQPZ; Fishing boat registration BX 246 (1934–39); Pennant Number V 409 (1939–44)
- Fate: Bombed and sunk

General characteristics
- Tonnage: 401 GRT, 155 NRT
- Length: 49.50 m (162 ft 5 in)
- Beam: 8.00 m (26 ft 3 in)
- Draught: 4.55 m (14 ft 11 in)
- Depth: 3.75 m (12 ft 4 in)
- Installed power: Triple expansion steam engine, 136nhp
- Propulsion: Single screw propeller
- Speed: 12 knots (22 km/h)

August Bösch was a German fishing trawler that was requisitioned by the Kriegsmarine in the Second World War for use as a Vorpostenboot, serving as V 409 August Bösch. She was bombed and sunk off the coast of Vendée, France in August 1944.

== Description ==
August Bösch was 49.50 metres (162 ft 5 in) long, with a beam of 8.00 metres (26 ft 3 in). She had a depth of 3.75 metres (12 ft 4 in) and a draught of 4.55 metres (14 ft 11 in). She was assessed at 401 GRT, 155 NRT. The ship was powered by a triple expansion steam engine, which had cylinders of 35 centimetres (13 3/4 in), 55 centimetres (21 5/8 in) and 88 centimetres (34 5/8 in) diameter by 66 centimetres (26 in) stroke. The engine was made by H. C. Stülcken Sohn, Hamburg, Germany. It was rated at 136nhp. It drove a single screw propeller via a low pressure turbine, and could propel the ship at 12.5 knots (23.2 km/h).

== History ==
August Bösch was built in 1934 as yard number 689 by H. C. Stülcken Sohn, Hamburg, for C. C. H. Bösch, Bremerhaven, Germany. She was launched on 8 June and competed on 10 August. The Code Letters DQPZ were allocated, as was the fishing boat registration BX 246.

On 25 September 1939, August Bösch was requisitioned by the Kriegsmarine for use as a vorpostenboot. She was commissioned into 4 Vorpostenflotille as V 409 August Bösch. On 20 August 1944, she was bombed and sunk in the Bay of Biscay off Les Sables-d'Olonne, Vendée, France (46°30′N 1°48′W) by Allied aircraft. The minesweeper M 4214 Jean Marthe was also sunk in the attack.

== Bibliography ==
- Gröner, Erich (1993). Die deutschen Kriegsschiffe 1815–1945 (in German). Vol. 8/I: Flußfahrzeuge, Ujäger, Vorpostenboote, Hilfsminensucher, Küstenschutzverbände (Teil 1). Koblenz: Bernard & Graefe. ISBN 3-7637-4807-5.
