= Ruhmeshalle (Wuppertal) =

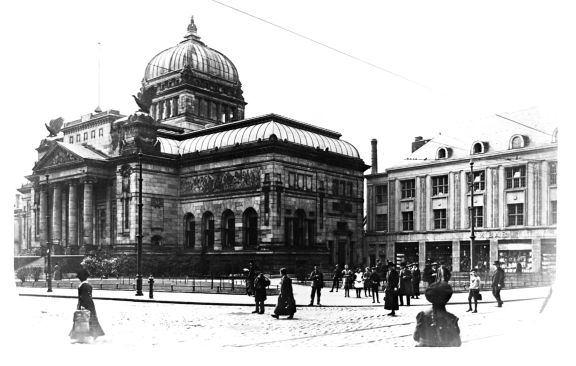
- The Barmer Ruhmeshalle, c 1900
- Interactive map of the Ruhmeshalle area
- Former names: Kaiser Wilhelm- und Friedrich-Ruhmeshalle
- Alternative names: Haus der Jugend

General information
- Type: Hall of Fame
- Location: Wuppertal, Germany
- Coordinates: 51°16′17″N 7°12′12″E

The Barmer Ruhmeshalle (German: [ˈbaʁmɐ ˈʁuːməsˌhalə]) is a historic building in the Barmen district of the German town of Wuppertal, originally built as a hall of fame. It was officially known as the Kaiser Wilhelm- und Friedrich-Ruhmeshalle and later as the Haus der Jugend.

== History ==
The Barmer Kunstverein, founded in 1866, endeavored to create exhibition spaces from the very beginning. Initially, the works of the association could be displayed in the "Concordia" society house on Werth. When this venue moved to a new building, the idea of constructing an art hall was born, and in 1886, a fund was established to finance the project. In the "Three Emperors' Year" (1888), the Barmer city administration decided to build a hall of fame in honor of Kaiser Wilhelm I and Kaiser Friedrich III, and provided the land for the project. The financing was then secured through the Barmer citizenry. In 1895, an architectural competition was held, which was won by the Barmer architect Erdmann Hartig. The director of the Barmer School of Arts and Crafts prevailed over 57 other submitted designs. After three years of construction, the building, officially named "Kaiser-Wilhelm-und-Friedrich-Ruhmeshalle" (Emperor Wilhelm and Frederick Hall of Fame), was inaugurated on October 24, 1900, by Kaiser Wilhelm II in the presence of a large crowd.

Under the art historian Richart Reiche, who became the conservator of the Kunstverein in 1907, modern works were shown. In 1909 and 1911, two "Sonderbund Exhibitions" were held, and in 1910, the Neue Künstlervereinigung München, the predecessor of the "Blue Rider" group, was presented to the public. Solo exhibitions of Franz Marc, Alexej von Jawlensky, and Emil Nolde were held in the same year, and in 1912, exhibitions of Adolf Erbslöh and Marianne von Werefkin followed. With the works of August Macke, Barmen became a stronghold of Expressionism in 1913. By the late 1920s, the Barmer Kunstverein had one of the most important and respected collections of modern art. However, during the Nazi "Degenerate Art" campaign in 1937, 94 works from this collection were confiscated, including pieces by Jankel Adler, Wladimir Bechtejew, Max Burchartz, Marc Chagall, Otto Dix, Wassily Kandinsky, Paul Klee, Franz Marc, and many others. Many of these works were subsequently destroyed.

When the cities of Barmen and Elberfeld merged to form the dual city of Elberfeld-Barmen in 1929 (officially Wuppertal from 1931), the Ruhmeshalle remained independent.

During World War II, the Luftangriff (air raid) on Barmen in the night of January 29–30, 1943, resulted in the near-total destruction of the dome building and the collection; the building burned down. The Städtisches Museum took over the management, and on April 21, 1946, the Kunstverein merged with the Elberfeld Museumsverein, which ran the Von der Heydt Museum, forming the Kunst- und Museumsverein (KMV). Many artworks were stored during the war, but losses from fire, theft, and confiscation were significant. The remaining parts of both collections were consolidated in the Elberfeld Von-der-Heydt-Museum.

In the 1950s, after over ten years as a ruin, the Ruhmeshalle was rebuilt. It was reopened on June 21, 1958, under the name "Haus der Jugend" (House of Youth), with a redesigned interior. The dome was not reconstructed, nor were the large stone eagles on the roof or the Kaiser statues, as they had been destroyed in the postwar period. An annex for the library was built in 1965. Despite extensive interior and roof modifications, the building was listed as a historic monument in 1985.

== See also ==
- Else Lasker-Schüler
- Wuppertal
- Jankel Adler

== Bibliography ==
- Lutz Engelskirchen: Die Barmer Ruhmeshalle. Von Bürgertum und Bürgergeist in Barmen. Göttingen: Cuvillier, 1996. ISBN 3-89588-405-7
