= Willy Reetz =

German painter

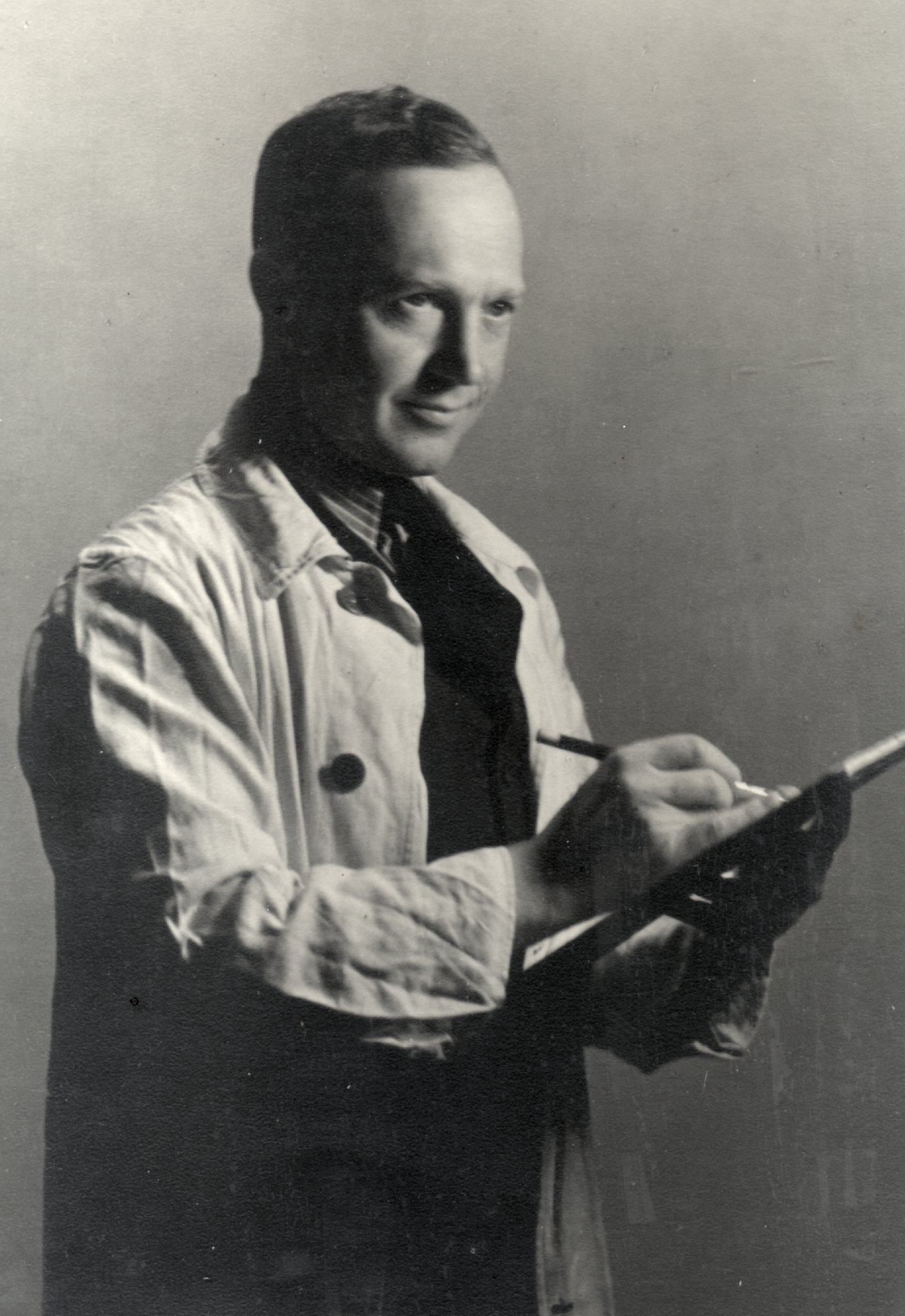
- Born: 27 May 1892; Düsseldorf, German Empire
- Died: 24 July 1963 (aged 71); Düsseldorf, West Germany
- Education: Kunstakademie Düsseldorf
- Movement: Malkasten; Künstlergruppe 1949; Düsseldorf School of painting

Wilhelm Reetz (1892–1963), known professionally as Willy Reetz, was a German artist and painter.

== Early life ==
Willy Reetz was born and died in Düsseldorf, where he started his career as an apprentice with a church painter. After that he attended the renowned Kunstgewerbeschule. After World War I Reetz studied at the Kunstakademie Düsseldorf under Professor Schmurr. From 1920 to 1924 he was a student in the master class of Professor Hans Kohlschein. Study trips to the Netherlands, France and Italy followed.

== Themes ==
Willy Reetz had an extraordinary talent for landscape, figures and portraits. In his early years until World War II he performed mural painting which had a long tradition in Düsseldorf. His mastery in this respect was reflected by the creation of several mural paintings in the Düsseldorf region: Together with Hans Kohlschein he created the frescos in the church Maria Rosenkranz in Düsseldorf-Wersten. In 1928/29 Reetz won the competition for the execution of murals in Düsseldorf's Dreifaltigkeitskirche and executed these until summer 1929. Commissions for St. Josef in Düsseldorf-Oberbilk, for churches in Süchteln, Galkhausen, Elberfeld and Sittard followed. Reetz also created secular murals in several restaurants and designed glas windows and mosaics. Unfortunately, almost all of these works were destroyed during World War II.

Another focus of Willy Reetz' activity was the creation of portraits and paintings of landscape. Reetz was a highly estimated member of the "Düsseldorf School of painting", also beyond Düsseldorf. Today, only few of his paintings remain in museums and private collection as his atelier was destroyed during a bombing of Düsseldorf in 1943.

Over 40 years, Willy Reetz was a member of the artists organization "Malkasten" and saved its precious archives during the war. After the war, Willy Reetz became a member of the artists group "Künstlergruppe 1949" and continued his activities in the "Malkasten" thus contributing to its reconstruction.

== Personal life ==
Reetz is not related to German painter and journalist Wilhelm Reetz (1887–1946).

== Selected works ==
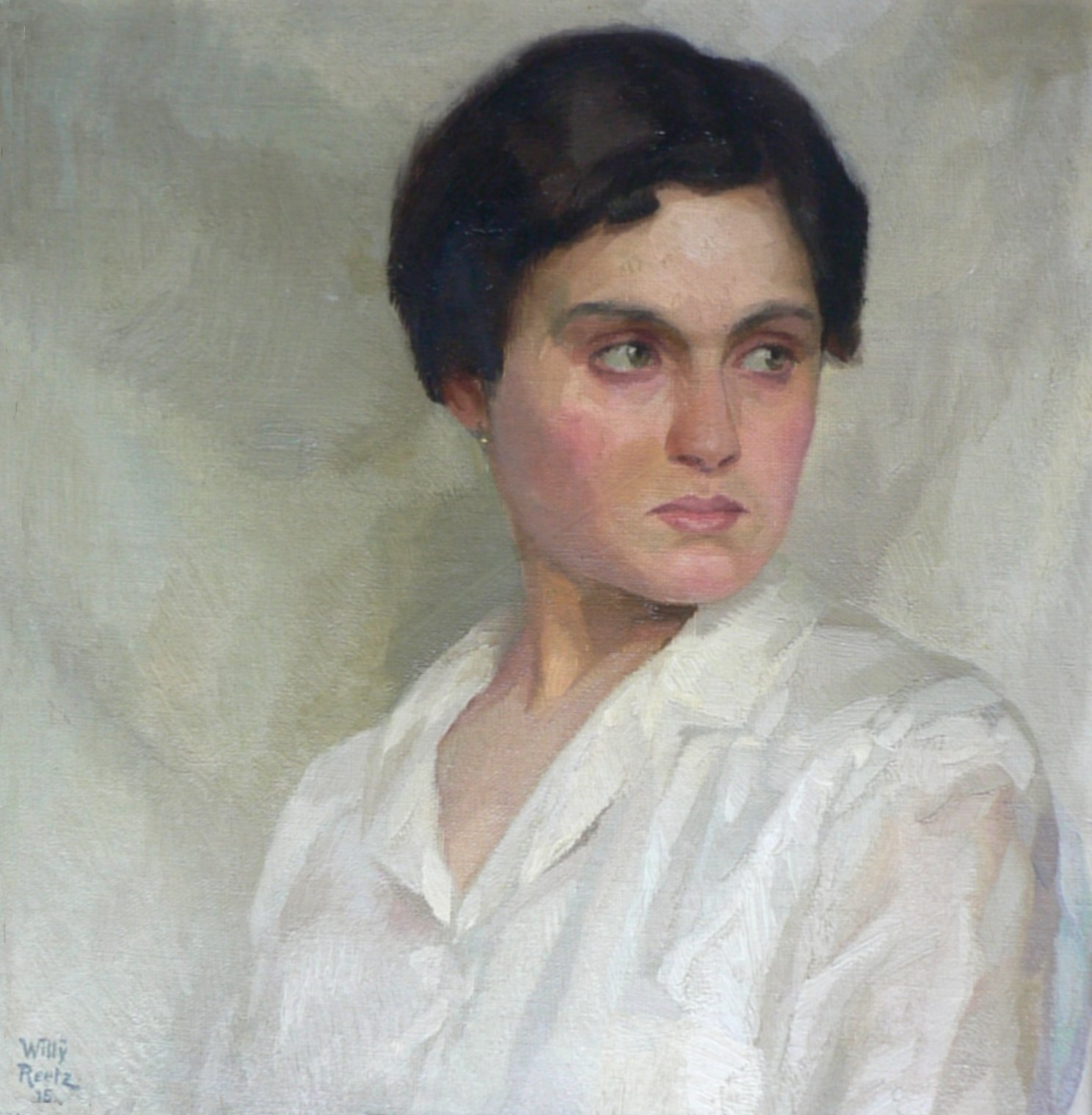
"Portrait" 1915

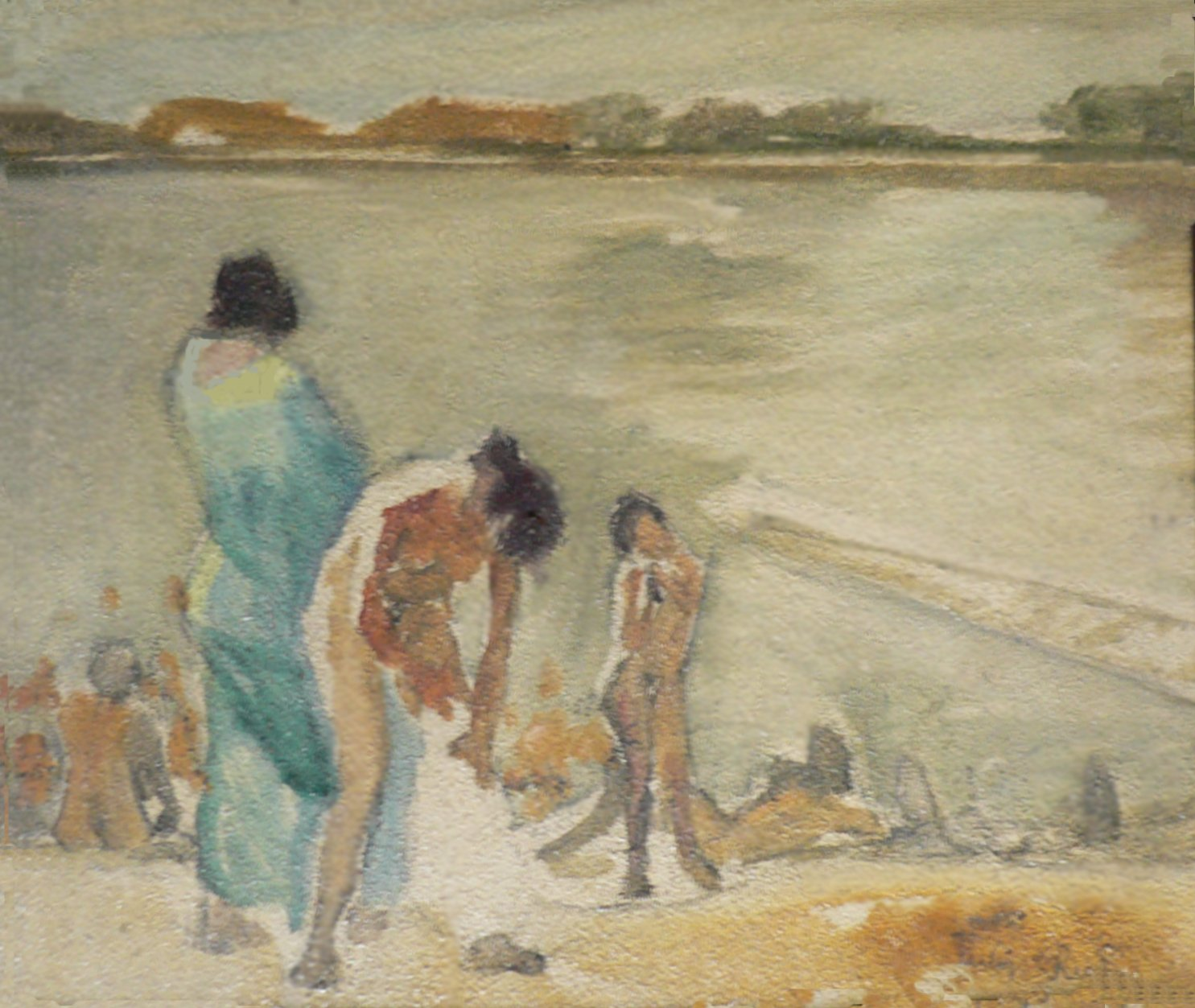
"Badende" ca. 1919

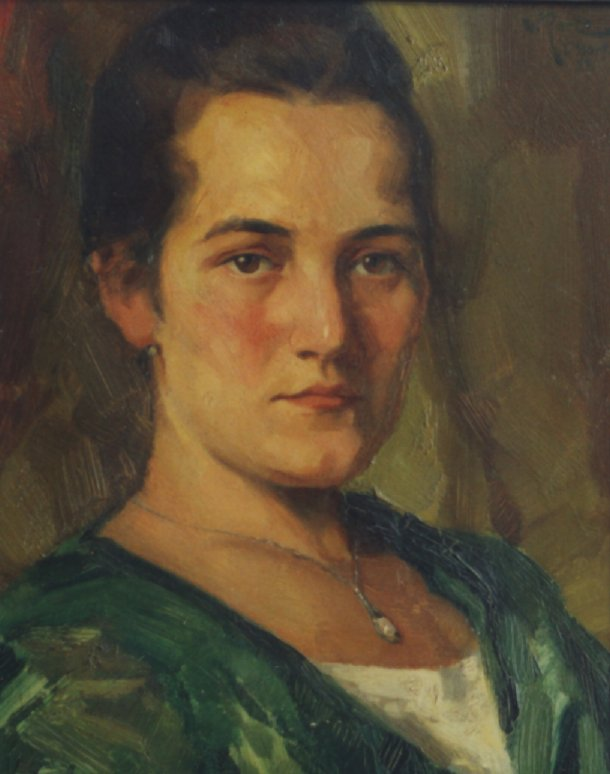
"Portrait Augusta Höllen" 1921

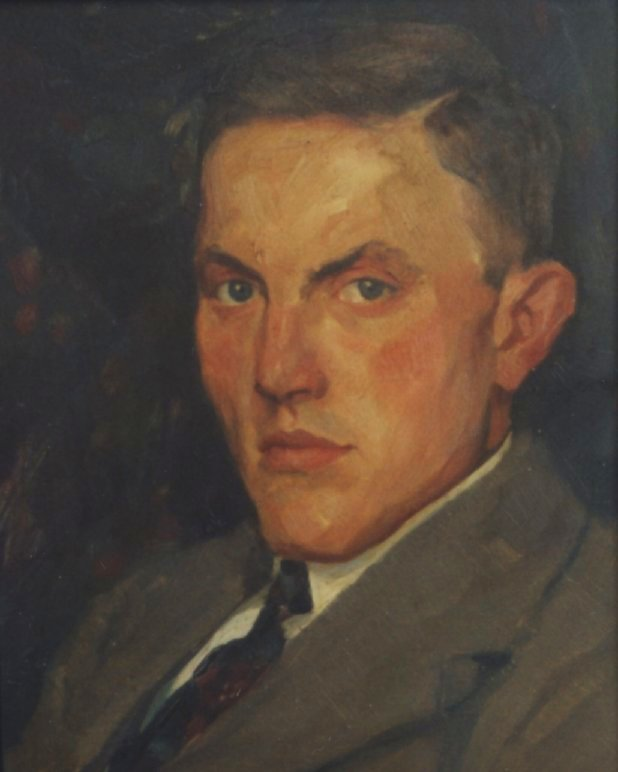
"Portrait Hans Höllen" 1921

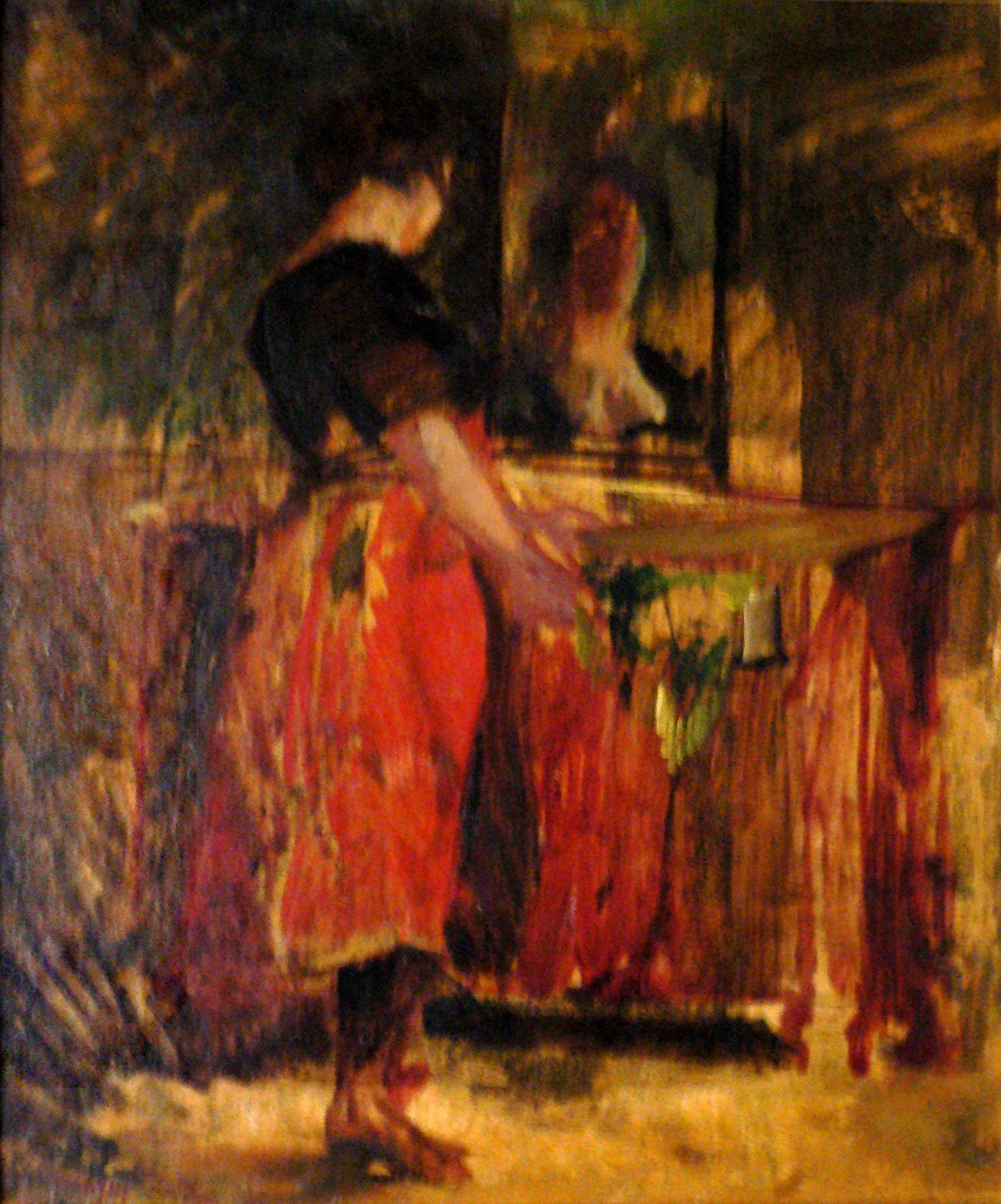
"Vor dem Spiegel" ca. 1928

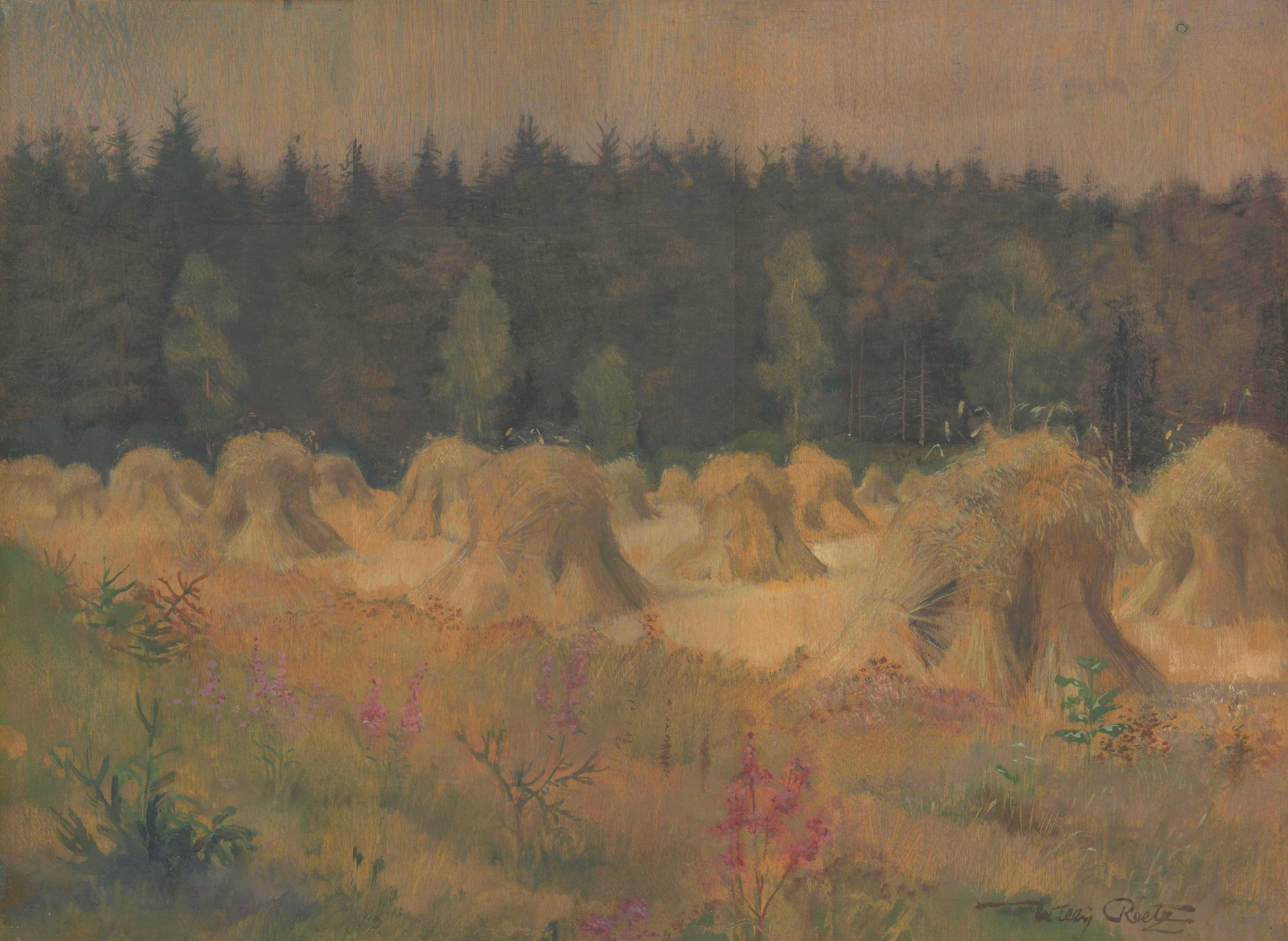
"Kornhocken am Waldrand" 1946

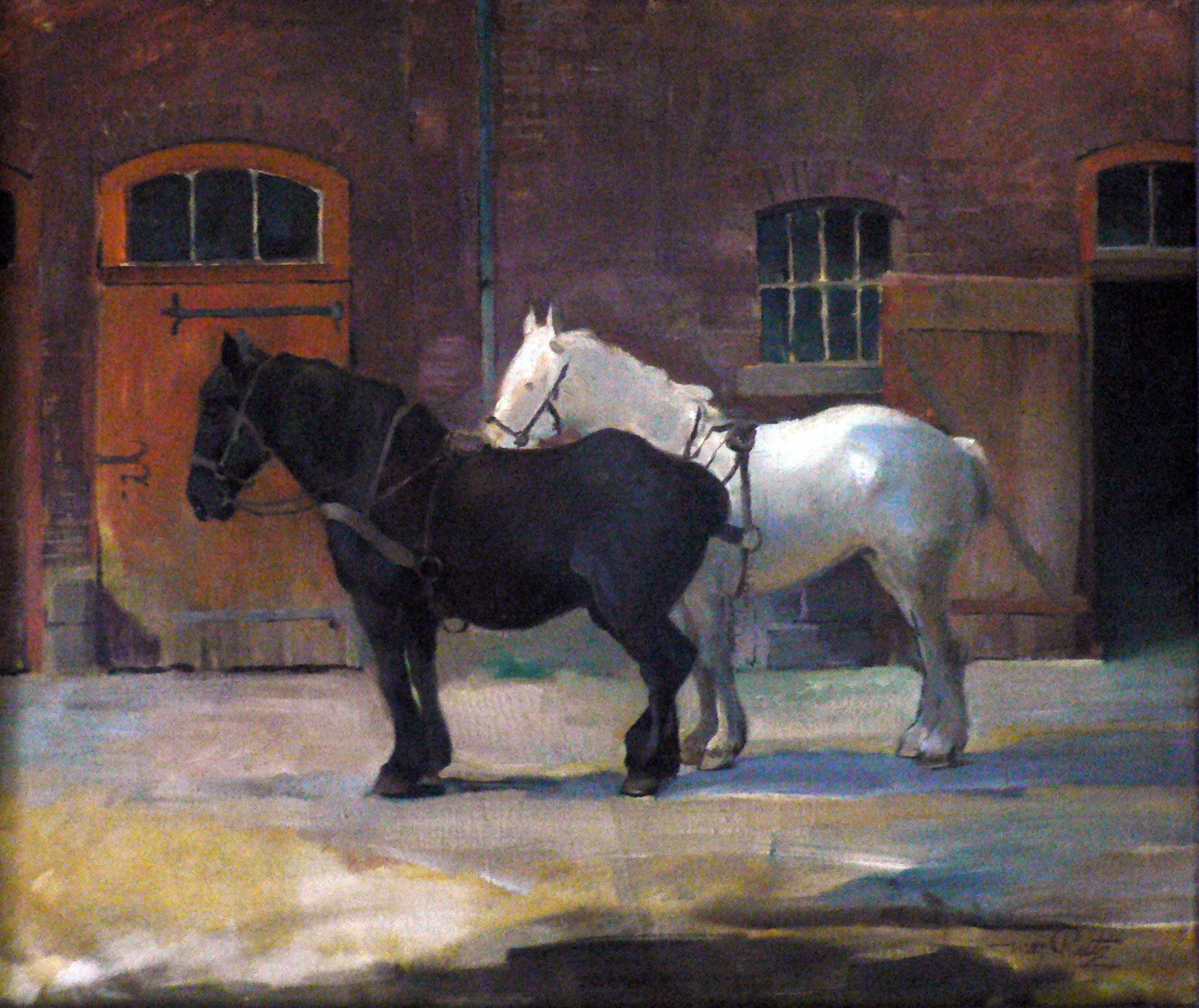
"Pferde" 1946

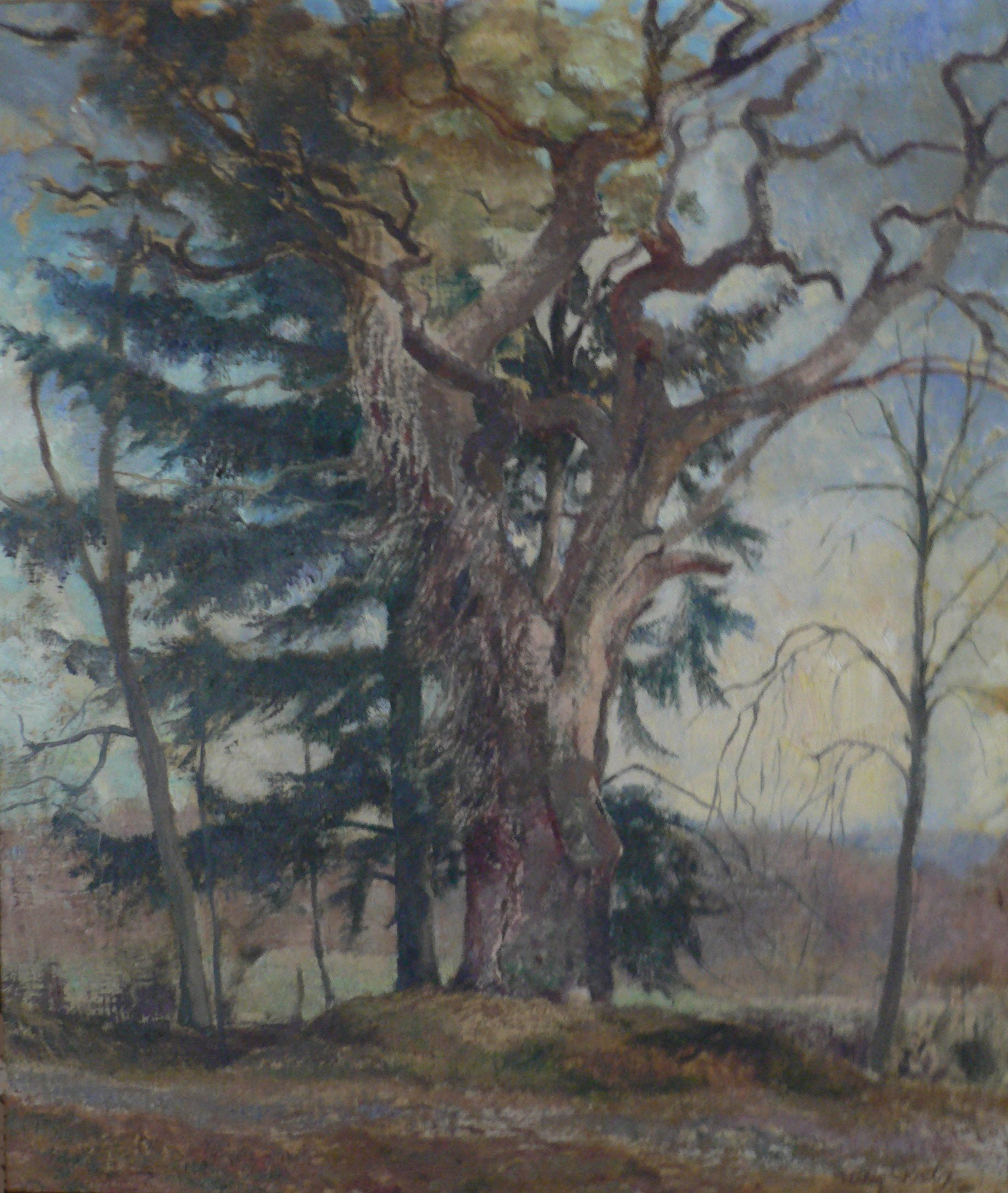
"Alte Eiche" 1947
