= Fritz Helmuth Ehmcke =

German graphical designer, typographer and illustrator

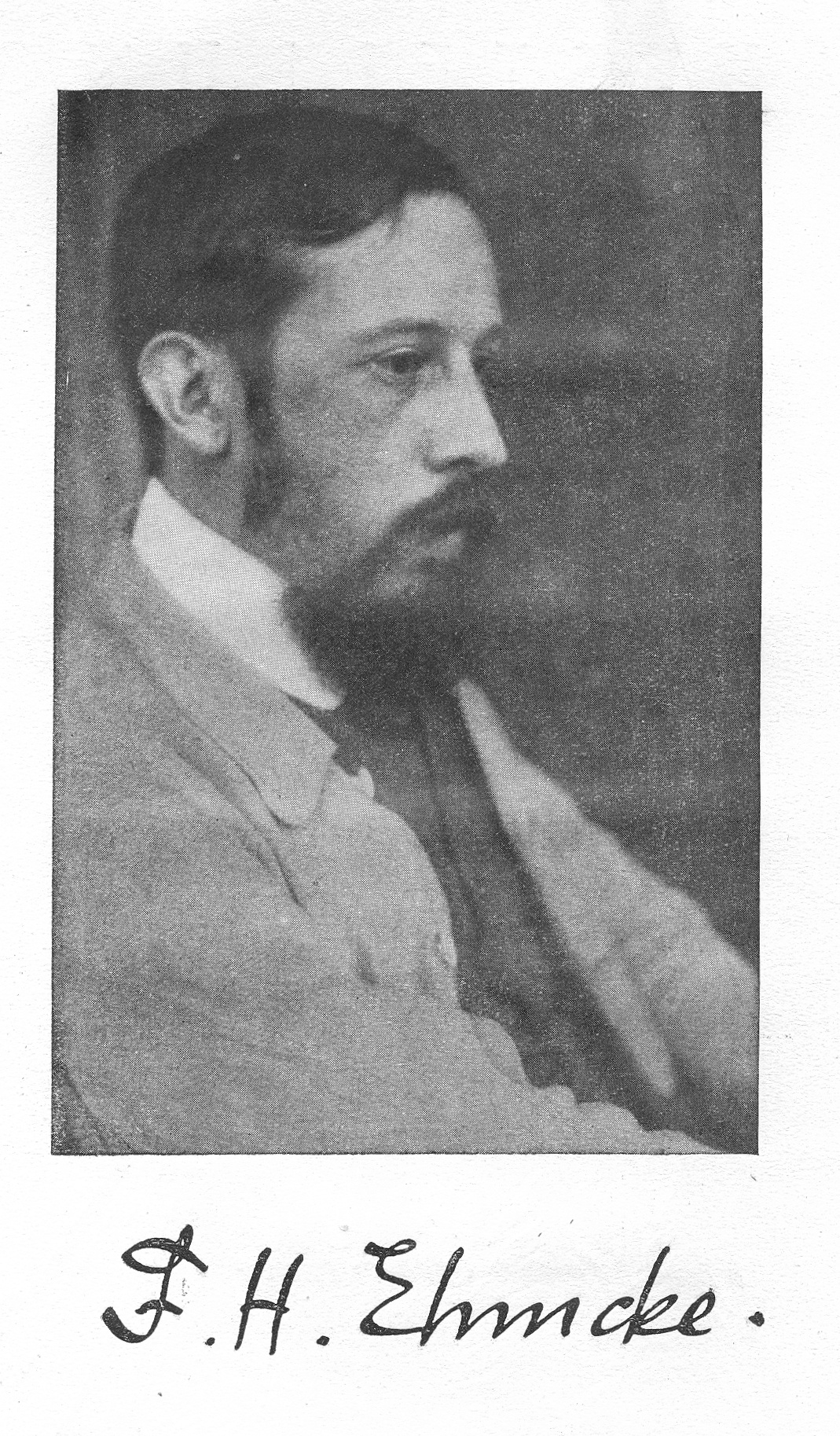
1920 portrait

Fritz Helmuth Ehmcke (1878–1965) was a German graphical designer, typographer and illustrator.

Born in Inowrocław, Prussia (now Poland), Ehmcke was educated as a lithographer in Berlin during 1893–1897. In 1900, he was a co-founder of Steglitzer Werkstatt.

From 1903, he taught at the Kunstgewerbeschule in Düsseldorf, from 1913 to 1938 in Munich, during 1920-1921 also in Zürich. During 1946 to 1948, he was professor at the Academy of Fine Arts, Munich.

He designed a number of typesets, notably Ehmcke-Antiqua and Ehmcke-Kursiv in 1909/10 (adopted for English-language typesetting by Stephenson Blake under the name Carlton).

== Typesets ==
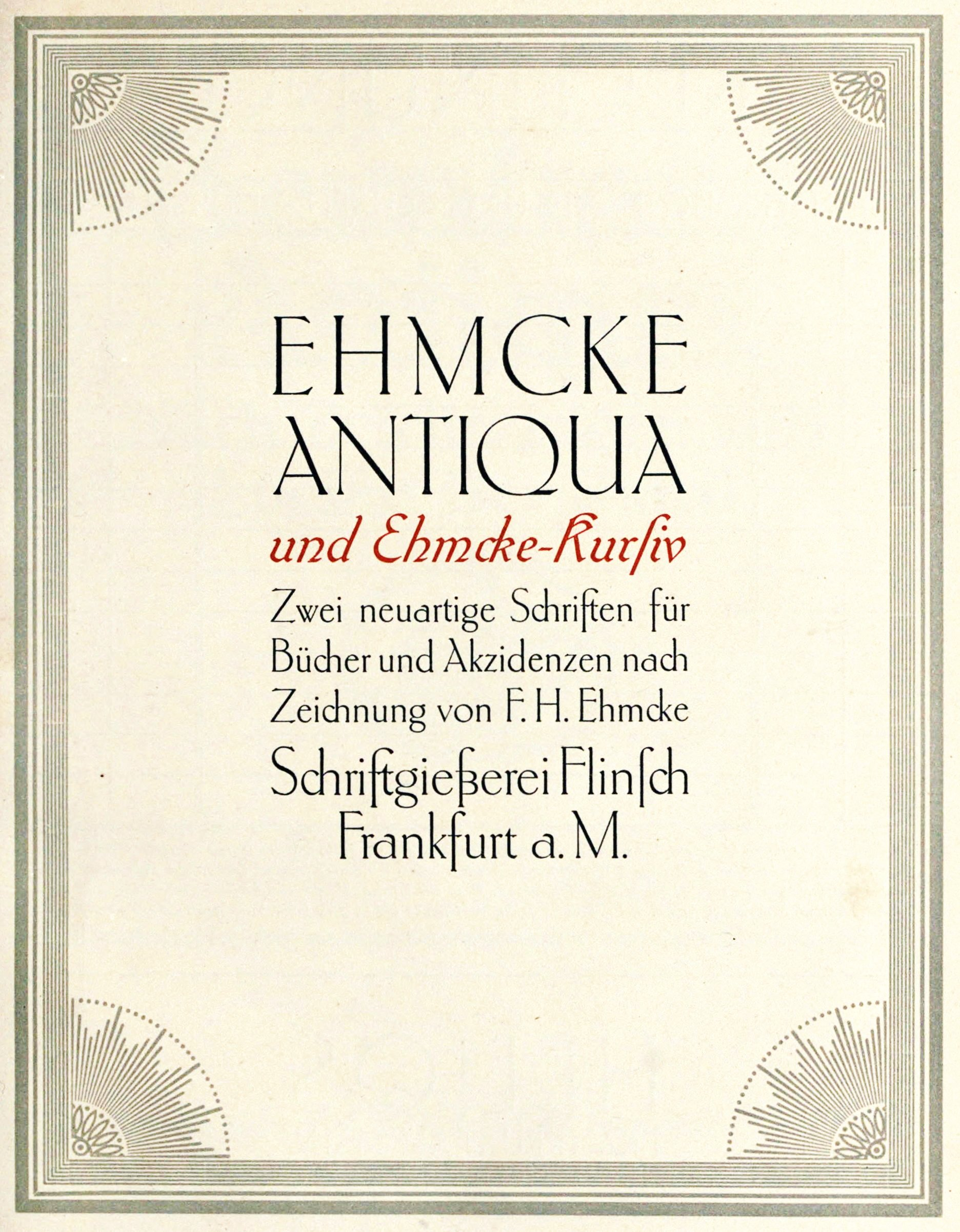
A specimen of Ehmcke's Ehmcke Antiqua from a 1912 book.

- Ehmcke Antiqua (1908 Flinsch)
- Ehmcke Kursiv (1910 Flinsch)
- Ehmcke Fraktur (1912 D. Stempel AG)
- Ehmcke Rustika (1914 D. Stempel AG)
- Ehmcke Schwabacher (1914 D. Stempel AG)
- Ehmcke Schwabacher halbfett (1915 D. Stempel AG)
- Ehmcke Fraktur halbfett (1917 D. Stempel AG)
- Ehmcke Mediaeval (1922 D. Stempel AG)
- Ehmcke Mediaeval kursiv (1923 D. Stempel AG)
- Ehmcke Mediaeval halbfett (1924 D. Stempel AG)
- Ehmcke Latein (1925 Ludwig & Mayer)
- Ehmcke-Latein halbfett (1925 Ludwig & Mayer)
- Ehmcke Brotschrift (1927 Rupprecht Presse)
- Ehmcke Elzevir (1927 L. Wagner)
- Ehmcke Elzevir kräftig (1930 L. Wagner)

== Bibliography ==
- Amtliche Graphik. Hugo Bruckmann, München 1918.
- Ehmcke-Kursiv (= Type und Ornament Heft XXXIX), Schriftgiesserei Flinsch, Frankfurt 1910.
- Ziele des Schriftunterrichts. Ein Beitrag zur modernen Schriftbewegung. Diederichs, Jena 1911, 2nd ed. 1929.
- Ehmcke-Mediaeval und Mediaeval-Kursiv. Berlin 1925.
- Die historische Entwicklung der abendlaendischen Schriftformen. Otto Maier, Ravensburg 1927.
- Persönliches und Sachliches. Gesammelte Aufsätze und Arbeiten aus 25 Jahren. Reckendorf, Berlin 1928.
- Kulturpolitik. Ein Bekenntnis und Programm zum Wiederaufbau deutscher Lebensform. Schauer, Frankfurt am Main 1947.
- Broschur und Schutzumschlag am deutschen Buch der neueren Zeit. Mainz 1951.
- Geordnetes und Gültiges. Gesammelte Aufsätze und Arbeiten aus den letzten 25 Jahren. Beck, München 1955.
- Der Sonderbund, Auszug aus F. H. Ehmckes Lebenserinnerungen I, 1909-1911, in: Neusser Jahrbuch für Kunst, Kulturgeschichte und Heimatkunde 1985, S.5-25.
- Der Sonderbund, Auszug aus F. H. Ehmckes Lebenserinnerungen II, 1911-1912, in: Neusser Jahrbuch für Kunst, Kulturgeschichte und Heimatkunde 1986, S.5-25.
