= August Maschmeijer Jr. =

Organic chemist

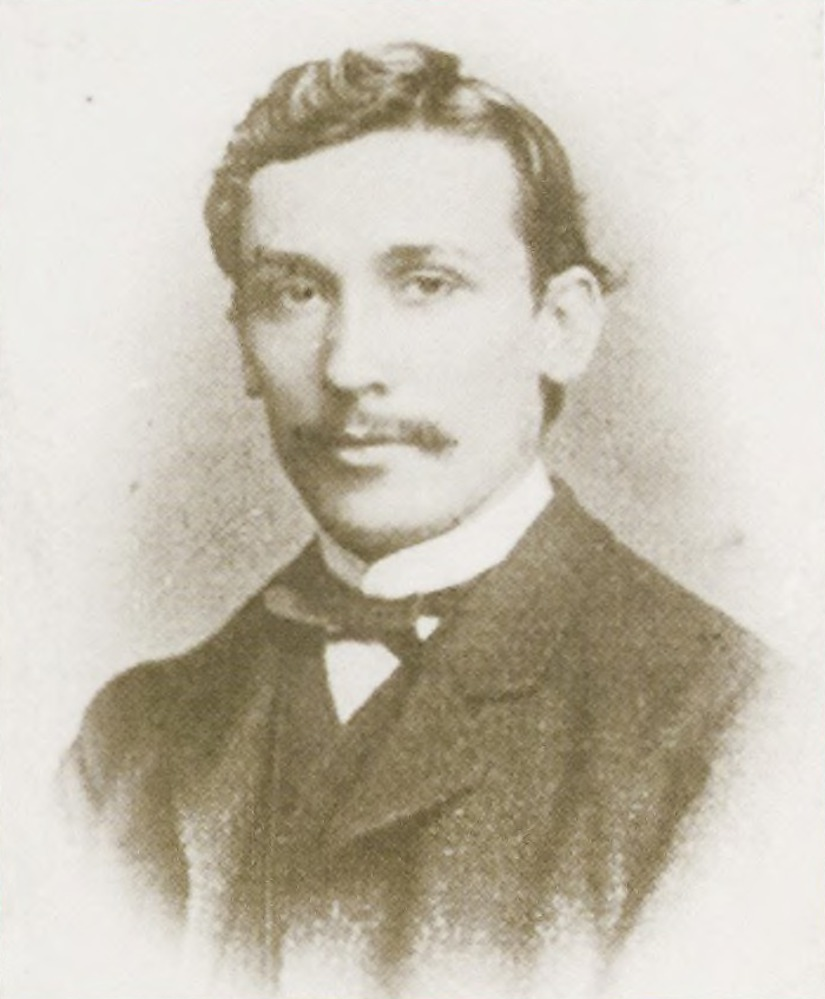
- Born: 1878; Netherlands
- Died: 1936 (aged 57–58)
- Occupations: Organic chemist, perfumier, merchant
- Known for: Founded the Dutch fragrance company Maschmeijer Aromatics

August Maschmeijer Jr. (1878 - 1936) was a Dutch organic chemist, perfumier and merchant.

== Life and work ==
August Maschmeijer founded Maschmeijer Aromatics (Dutch: Parfumfabriek A. Maschmeijer), a fragrance and flavour company that was in operation between 1900 and 1960 in Amsterdam.

They traded raw materials as well as finished products. Straight from the beginning August Maschmeijer set-up depots in Paris and New York City. Later he traded also from Cologne and Milan. The company was founded as a factory for 'Products of Organic Chemistry', i.e. products for the manufacture of perfumes, toilet soap, confectionery, import and export of essential oils and dyes. In 1907 the factory moved to new premisses at the Omval (Amsterdam). In 1919 the company employed the perfumer Carl Schlabs who created a line called C.S. Perfumes. These perfumes became mainly popular in India, Pakistan and the Middle East.

August Maschmeijer moved with his family to 'De Zuilenhof' outside Bergen in 1924. In 1954 the legal form of the business was changed from a family owned private liability company (besloten vennootschap met beperkte aansprakelijkheid) to a company whose shares were traded on the stock market (naamloze vennootschap).

In 1960 the holding of the company was acquired by Naarden International Holland BV (CFN = Chemical Factory Naarden), which later became a part of Quest International. Around the same time a new company was started in Chennai (India) under the name Maschmeijer Aromatics (India) Ltd.

The Dutch company, Maschmeijer Aromatics, permitted its technical know-how to be transferred to the Indian company. They have also permitted the exclusive use of their patent trademark, design, certification marks. processes and modes of production for the manufacture and sale of the said production in India. The Dutch company contributed 49% of the subscribed capital and was given 49% of the shareholding. The remains of the factory in the Netherlands were demolished in the 1990s, while the Indian company still produces fragrances and musks as well as flavours for use in savories and in confectionery, chocolates, milk and related products. Syed Shareef and his sons Syed Mohamed Shajahan and Syed Mohamed Naseer Ahmed currently run the operations of this company in Chennai

== Personal life ==
In his spare time, August Maschmeijer was interested in visual arts and financially supported among others the painters Leo Gestel, Piet Wiegman, and Dirk Filarski.
