= Hübers =

Hübers is a German surname. Notable people with the surname include:

- Dirk Hubers (1913–2003), Dutch ceramist
- Richard Hübers (born 1993), German fencer
- Shayna Hubers (born 1991), American murderer
- Timo Hübers (born 1996), German footballer

== See also ==
- Huberts
- Huibers
