= List of Dutch and Flemish paintings in the National Museum of Serbia =

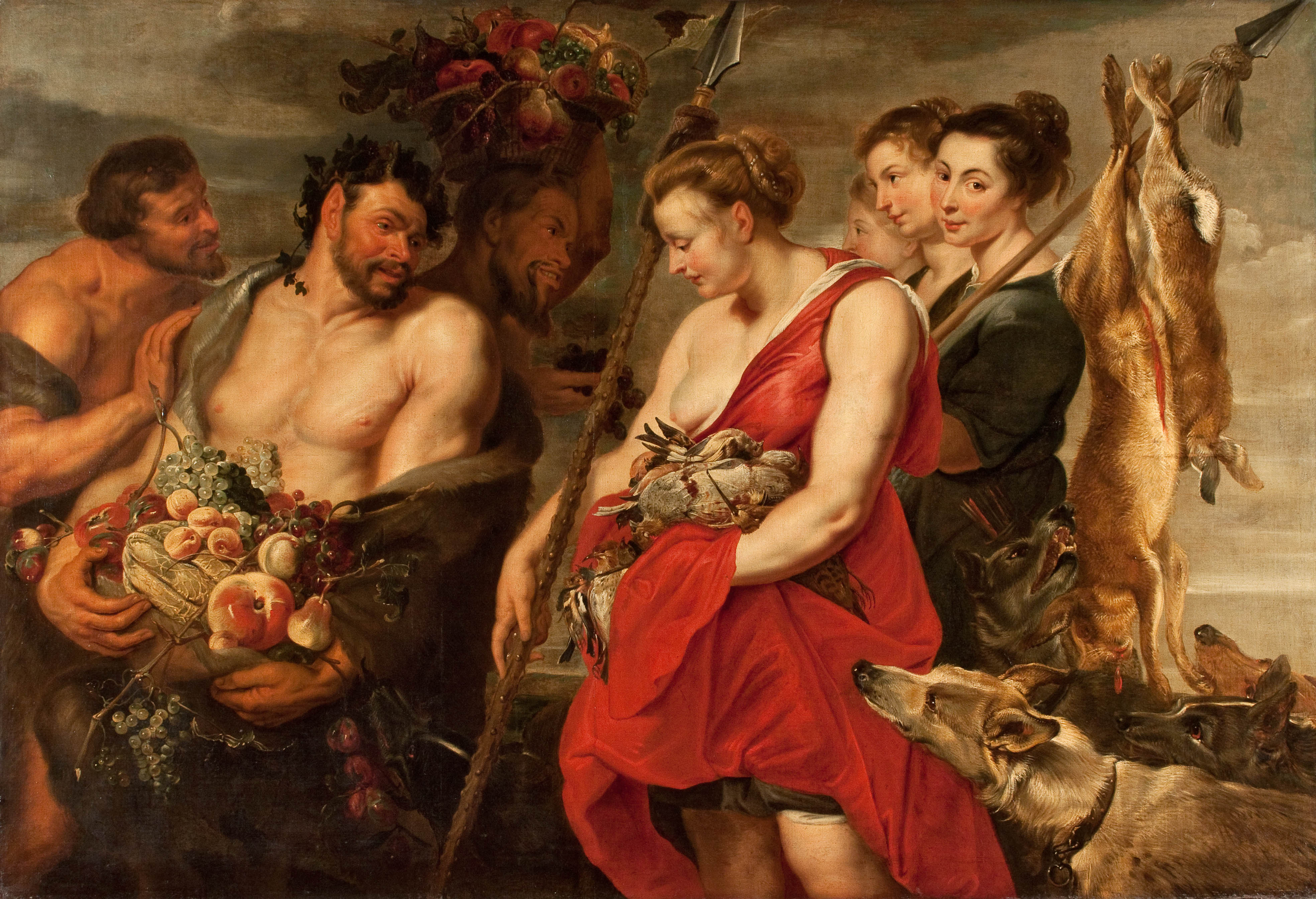
Diana Presenting the Catch to Pan by Peter Paul Rubens, oil on canvas 1615, W: 211.5 cm (83.3 in). H: 145 cm (57.1 in).

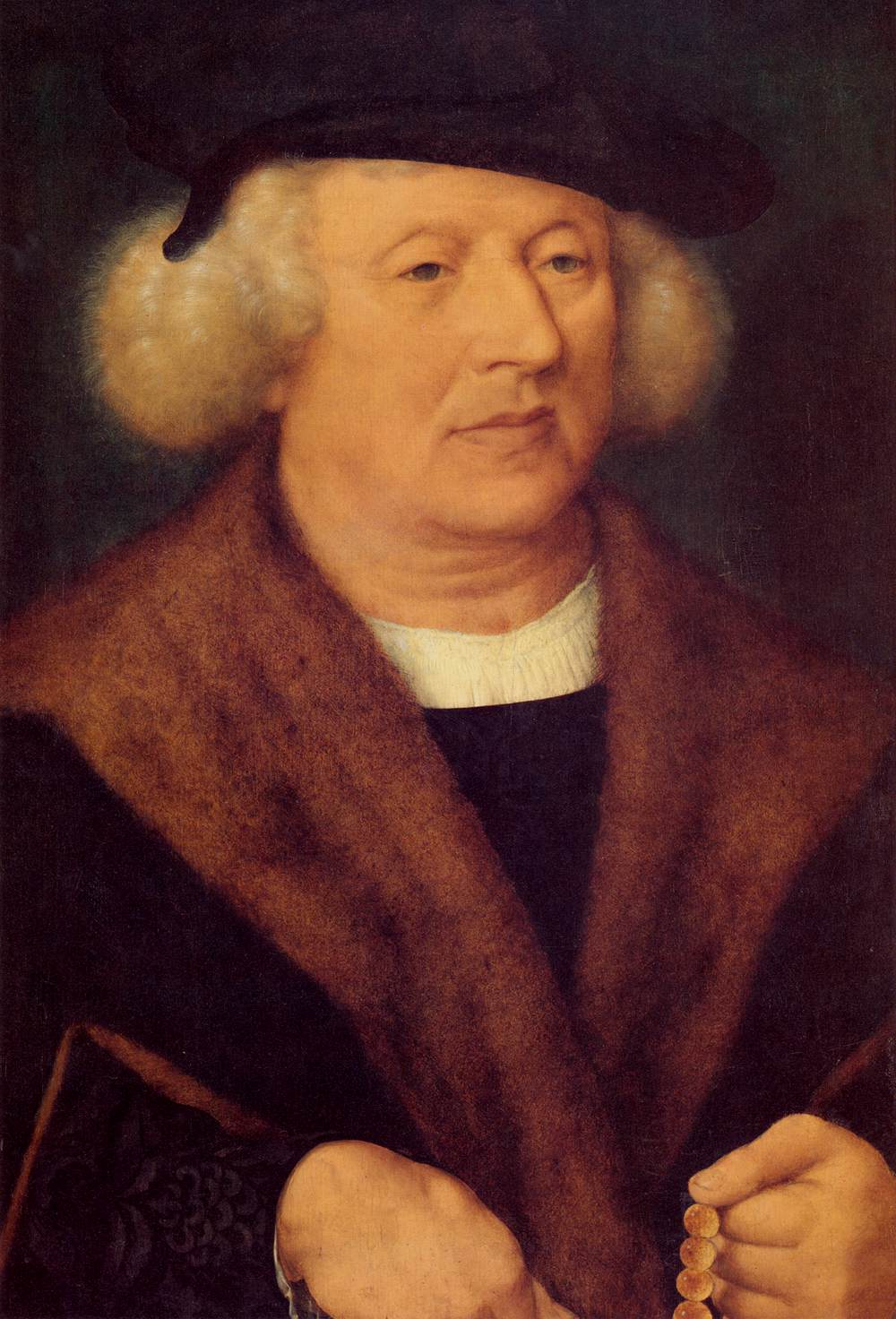
Portrait of a man with the rosary, by Joos van Cleve c. 1520

The Dutch and Flemish collection in the National Museum of Serbia in Belgrade consists of more than 500 works (210 paintings of art and 220 graphics and engravings, and over 80 drawings). The National Museum of Serbia was the first museum in the world to include a Piet Mondrian painting in its permanent display. Represented artists include Juan de Flandes, Hieronymus Bosch, Cornelis de Vos, Anthony van Dyck, Antonis Mor, Jan Brueghel the Elder, Marten de Vos, Joos van Cleve, Jan Antonisz. van Ravesteyn, Rubens, Jan van Goyen, Justus Sustermans, Cornelis de Vos, Willem van Aelst, Frans van Mieris, Sr., Paulus Potter, Caspar Netscher, Jan Frans van Bloemen, Adam Frans van der Meulen, Godfried Schalcken, Adriaen van Utrecht, Johan Jongkind, Jan Victors, Kees van Dongen, Anton Mauve, Allart van Everdingen, Vincent van Gogh and Piet Mondrian.

- Dieric Bouts, attribution Adoration of Magi (tempera 76 x 89)
- Juan de Flandes, Behold the Lamb of God, oil on wood, c. 1497, 80 x 52 cm
- Hieronymus Bosch, The Temptation of Saint Anthony, tempera on panel
- Joos van Cleve, Portrait of a man with the rosary
- Jan Sanders van Hemessen, Ruler getting tribute
- Antonis Mor, Portrait of Spanish Nobleman
- Marten de Vos, Paradise
- Jan Brueghel the Elder, Flowers and (attributed) Landscape with John the Baptist (oil on panel)
- Rubens (2 paintings) Diana gifts catch to Pan oil on canvas, 145 x 211.5 cm, c. 1615 and Roman Emperor Galba oil on panel
- Jan Thomas van Ieperen, Leopold I in Costume and Empress Margaritha Theresia
- Flemish School, Saint Anna and Saint, (early 15th century),
- Jan Antonisz. van Ravesteyn, Portrait of Man with black cap
- Justus Sustermans, Portrait of woman
- Anthony van Dyck (1 painting,1 attributed) Self-Portrait, oil on canvas and Portrait of a Man with a Green Overcoat
- Frans van Mieris, Sr., The Music Lesson
- Cornelis de Vos, Portrait of young girl
- Gerard de Lairesse, Heracle and Omfala (73 x 102 cm oil on panel)
- Gerrit Dou, Boy with the Glass on the Window
- Jan Steen, Scene in the Church (miniature tempera on ivory, 9 x 12 cm)
- Adriaen van Utrecht, Game Trader
- Sebastian Vrancx Battle
- Nicolas Régnier, Judith with Halophen's Head (Oil on Canvas 98 x 123 cm c. 1630)
- Roelant Savery, A wagon in the forest
- Adriaen van der Werff, Flute Lessons
- Abraham van Beijeren, Still Life with Grapes, Pomegranate and Ostrych, Still Life with the Melon, Peaches and Grapes
- Jan van Goyen, Landscape
- Nicolaes Pieterszoon Berchem, Storm
- Flemish School, Horseman with trumpet (16th century)
- Jan Abrahamsz Beerstraaten, Port (1665)
- Adriaen Brouwer, At the tavern
- Allaert van Everdingen, Landscape with the sea
- Anthonie Palamedesz., Soldier with Letter
- Jan Frans van Bloemen, Landscape in Arcadia (oil on canvas, 65 x 49 cm, 1738), Landscape with Figures
- Paulus Potter, Landscape with Cows
- Osias Beert. Still Life with the Dragonfly
- Théobald Michau, Landscape with the Cattle
- Adam Frans van der Meulen, People in the Garden
- David Teniers the Elder, Sathyr and Nympha, At the Tavern, In the front of Tavern
- Abraham van Beijeren (2 paintings) Still life with fruit and Still Life with Melon and Peaches
- Jan Victors, Portrait of Children
- Adriaen van de Velde, Landscape
- Joost Cornelisz Droochsloot, Dutch village
- Godfried Schalcken, Woman
- Willem van Aelst, Still Life with peacock
- Caspar Netscher, Lady
- Adriaen van de Velde, Landscape
- Adam Frans van der Meulen, Group at garden
- Carel de Moor, Girl with the Dog
- Roelof Jansz van Vries, Landscape with cottage
- Lieve Verschuier, Storm
- Jacques d'Arthois, Landscape
- Pieter Mulier II, Pastorale Composition (Oil on Canvas 128 x 195 cm), Landscape with Sarcophagus (canvas 47 x 159 cm)
- Osias Beert, Still Life
- Nicolaes Pieterszoon Berchem, Landscape with shepherd and Landscape with mountains and shepherd
- Vincent van Gogh (1 painting,1 drawing) Peasant Woman Standing Indoor and The writer at his desk
- Jan Toorop, Of the sea
- Otto van Rees, Girl
- Isaac Israëls, Female Drummer
- Alfred Stevens (painter), Shells collecting
- Dirk Filarski, Village view of Giethoorn
- George Hendrik Breitner, Ships in the Port
- Johannes Evert Hendrik Akkeringa, Still Life
- Willem de Zwart, Barn with cattle
- Jan Sluyters, Nude, Two Fishermans
- Johan Jongkind, Landscape from Grenoble (aquarel)
- Bergen School (art) -by Harrie Kuyten, Landscape with the farm
- Kees van Dongen, Female portrait
- Piet Mondrian, Composition II
- Simon Maris, Portrait of woman with fan
- Carel Willink, Two Thirty at night (gouache) and Composition (tempera)
- Pulchri Studio (Toon Kelder), Head of the boy with red tie
- Floris Jespers, Flemish countryside
- Constant Permeke, (2 paintings) Countryside and Dunes
- Kees Maks, Circus
- Médard Tytgat, Little Yvon
- André Hallet, Port in Ostende
- Lizzy Ansingh, Dolls (canvas 77 x 61)
