= Bergen school =

Bergen school may refer to:

- Bergen School (art)
- Bergen School of Architecture
- Bergen school of meteorology
