= Mommie Schwarz =

Dutch Jewish painter and graphic artist

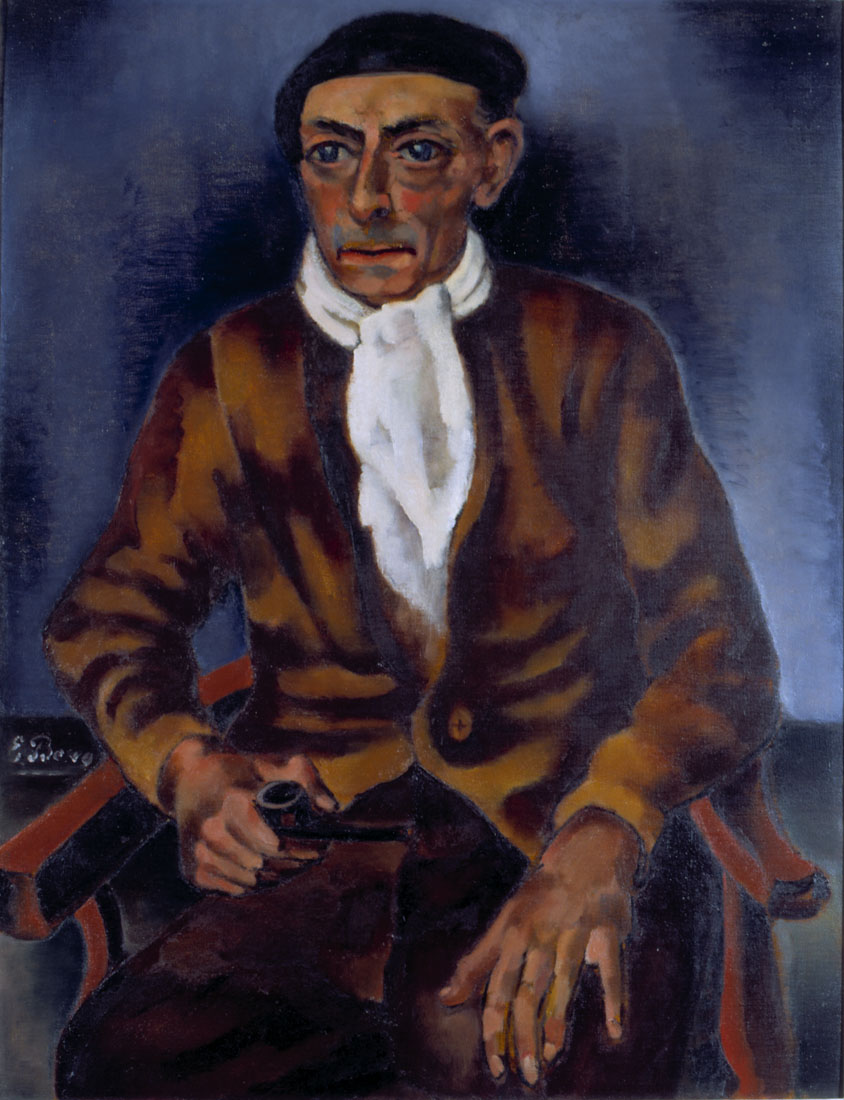
- Portrait of Mommie Schwarz by Else Berg, 1936
- Born: Samuel Leser Schwarz; 28 July 1876; Zutphen, Netherlands
- Died: 19 November 1942 (aged 66); Auschwitz-Birkenau, German-occupied Poland
- Education: Academy of Antwerp
- Known for: Painting
- Movement: Bergen School

Samuel Leser Schwarz, known as Mommie (28 July 1876 – 19 November 1942) was a Dutch Jewish painter and graphic artist. He also worked as a designer of book covers.

In 1920, he married Else Berg. Together they became an artistic couple and were part of the Bergen School of painters. Schwarz and Berg were both murdered at Auschwitz in 1942.

== Life ==
Schwarz was the tenth child of Leser Schwarz and Julie Winter. The family had eleven children. In 1897 he went with his brother Julius to New York City. In 1902 Mommie Schwarz returned to Europe and registered at the Academy of Fine Arts in Antwerp for the evening class of 1902–1903. On 26 March 1903 he unsubscribed at the academy and returned to New York where he arrived on 11 August 1903. In 1908 or 1909, Mommie left New York for Europe. Shortly afterwards he traveled to Berlin to visit his nephew Erich and his niece Else Berg. Subsequently, Else and Mommie traveled to Paris. In 1909 or 1910, he settled with Berg in the Netherlands. In 1915 they moved to the town of Schoorl, where they established close ties with Leo Gestel and other artists from the Bergen School. The couple married in 1920 and moved to Amsterdam. From 1927 they lived adjacent to Amsterdam's Sarphatipark. By this time, Schwarz had cut all ties with Judaism. The couple traveled extensively, including trips to Mallorca, the former Yugoslavia, Turkey and Spain. After the German occupation of the Netherlands in World War II, they refused to go into hiding or to wear the Star of David. On 12 November 1942, they were arrested by the Germans and deported via the Westerbork transit camp to Auschwitz, where they were murdered immediately upon arrival on 19 November 1942.

== Work ==
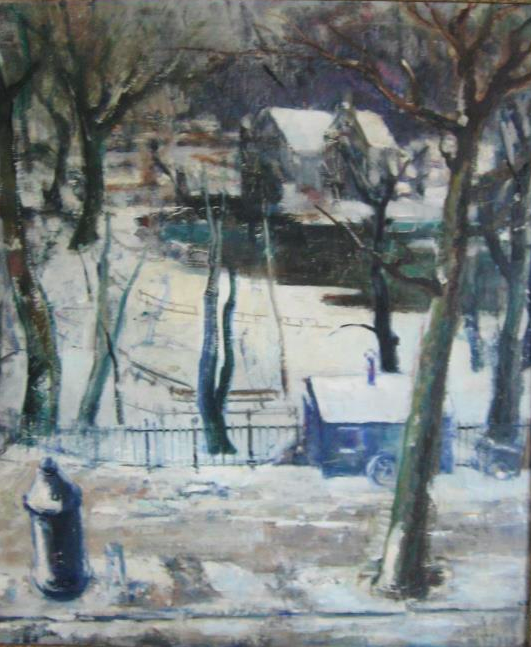
One of Schwarz's last known works, Gezicht op het Sarphatipark (View of Sarphati Park), oil on canvas, ca. 1942

Schwarz belonged to the Bergen School of painters and was influenced by such painters as Leo Gestel and Charley Toorop. The works of the Bergen School are characterized by Cubist figuration and expressionist influences in dark shades, which also applies to much of Schwarz's work.

Schwarz is especially known for his harbor scenes, landscapes, portraits and still lifes.

He also worked as an illustrator and designed book covers and posters, including illustrations for the Dutch art magazine Wendingen.

== Public collections ==
- Jewish Historical Museum in Amsterdam
- Museum Kranenburgh in Bergen (North Holland)
- The Wieger Museum in Deurne, North Brabant
