= Sarphatipark =

Park in Amsterdam, Netherlands

Coordinates: 52.354°N 4.896°E

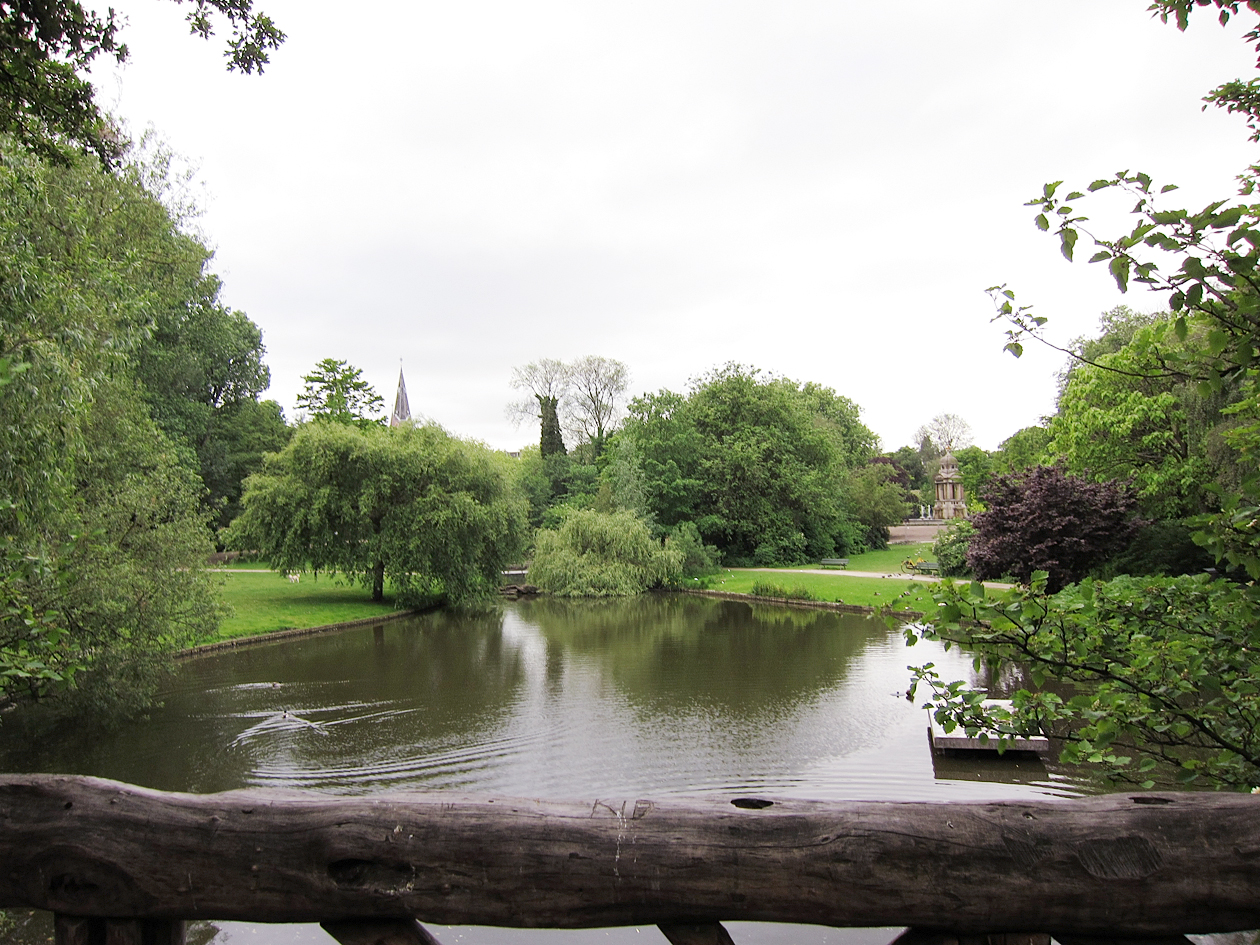
- The Sarphatipark in 2005
- Interactive map of Sarphatipark
- Type: Urban park
- Location: Amsterdam, Netherlands
- Operator: Amsterdam Oud-Zuid

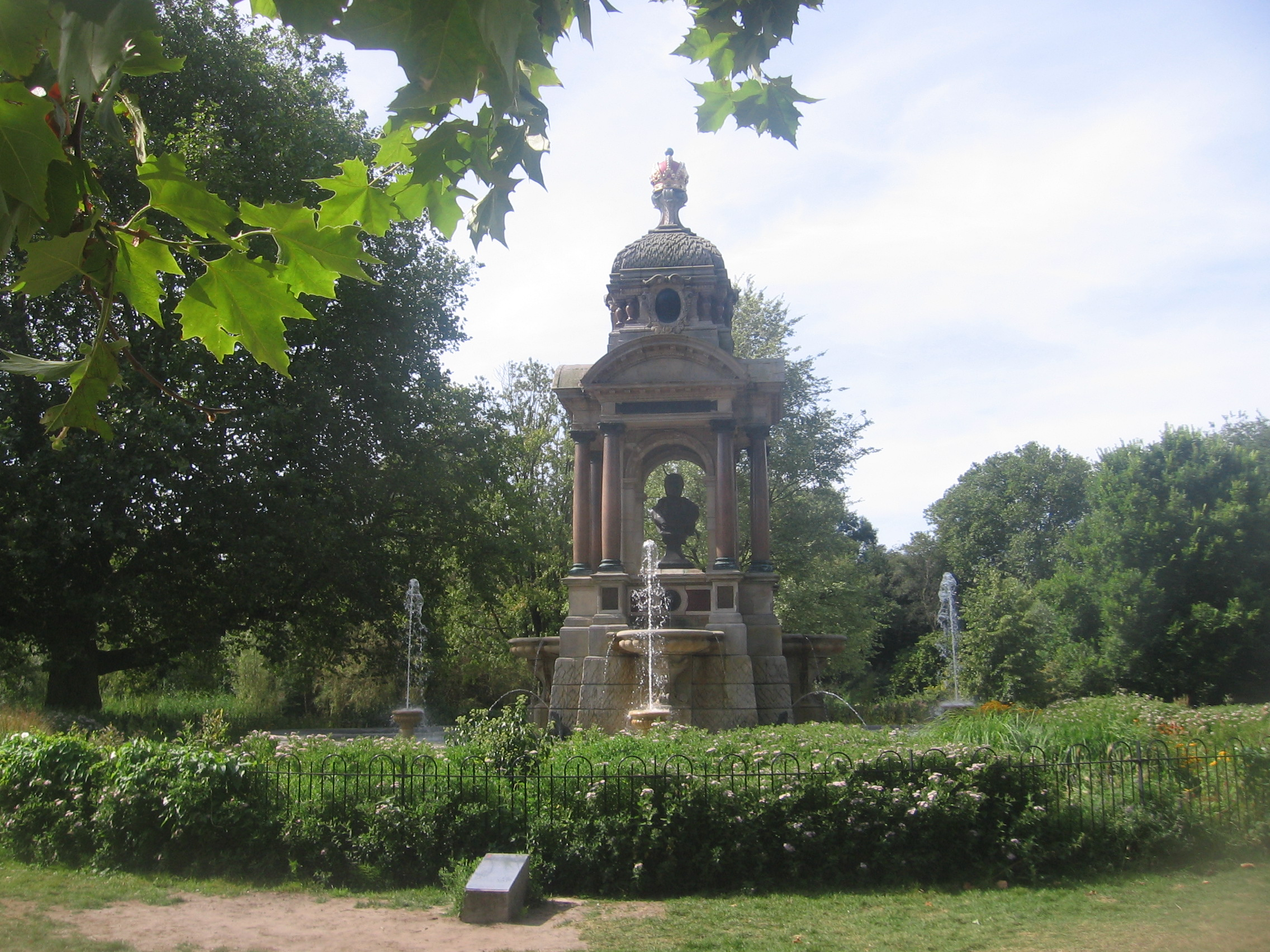
The Sarphatipark in 2024

The Sarphatipark (Dutch pronunciation: [sɑrˈfaːtiˌpɑr(ə)k]) is a public urban park located in the stadsdeel Amsterdam Oud-Zuid in Amsterdam, Netherlands. The park is named after Samuel Sarphati.

In 1942, the park was renamed "Bollandpark" after G.J.P.J. Bolland, because Samuel Sarphati was a Jew. The old name was restored after the war in 1945.

The Dutch painter Mommie Schwarz and his wife Else Berg lived adjacent to the park from 1927 until their deportation to, and execution at, the Auschwitz concentration camp in 1942. Some of their last works were landscape paintings of the park.
