= Harm Kamerlingh Onnes =

Dutch painter

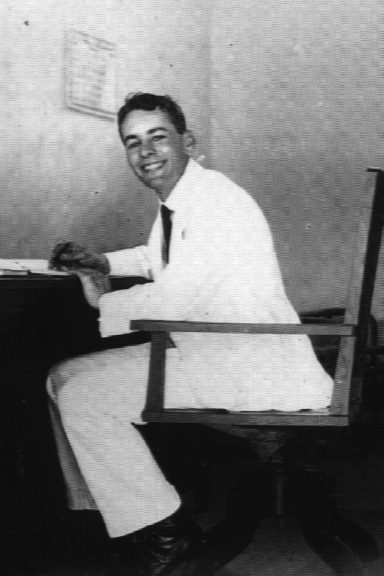
Harm Kamerlingh Onnes

Harm Henrick Kamerlingh Onnes (Dutch pronunciation: [ˈɦɑrm ˈɦɛnrɪk ˈkaːmərlɪŋ ˈɔnəs]; 15 February 1893, Zoeterwoude – 20 May 1985, Leiden) was a Dutch portrait painter and ceramist, who also produced designs for stamps and stained-glass windows. He is best known for the small, humorous vignettes of everyday life.

== Life and work ==
Kamerlingh Onnes was born in Zoeterwoude in 1893. His father Menso Kamerlingh Onnes was a painter and member of the Hague School, who in 1911 gave his son permission to develop as an artist. He also gave him his first drawing and painting lessons. One of his uncles was the painter Floris Verster, and another uncle the physicist and Nobel Prize winner Heike Kamerlingh Onnes.

In his early years from 1915 to 1925 his work was influenced by modernism. In 1918 he designed a number of abstract stained-glass windows for the Spark House, which was designed by Jacobus Oud. From 1925, he started to take the everyday reality as his subject, and from that time he only made figurative works. It was after a visit to the studio of Mondrian, that he had realized that abstract art was not for him. Some of his designs for stained-glass windows have discoveries of physicists Pieter Zeeman and Hendrik Lorentz as a subject. One of these stained-glass windows contained a portrait of Hendrik Lorentz and formulas devised by him that describe the behavior of electrons. Other stained-glass windows show the instruments to measure the splitting of spectral lines of atoms under the influence of a magnetic field is measured, the so-called Zeeman effect. He also made portraits of the physicists Albert Einstein and Paul Ehrenfest.

Kamerlingh Onnes' work was included in the 1939 exhibition and sale Onze Kunst van Heden (Our Art of Today) at the Rijksmuseum in Amsterdam.

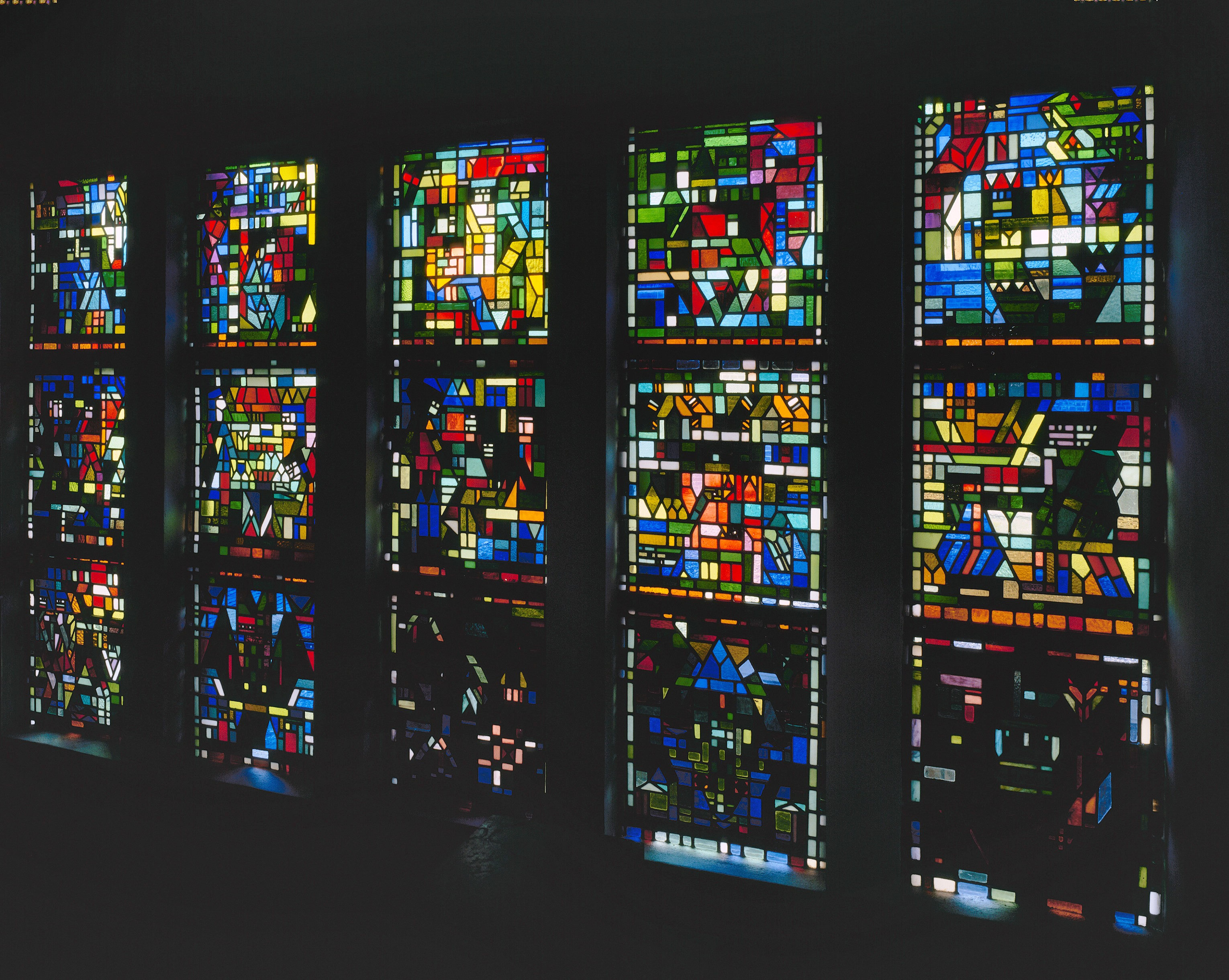
Glass stained windows, Noordwijkerhout

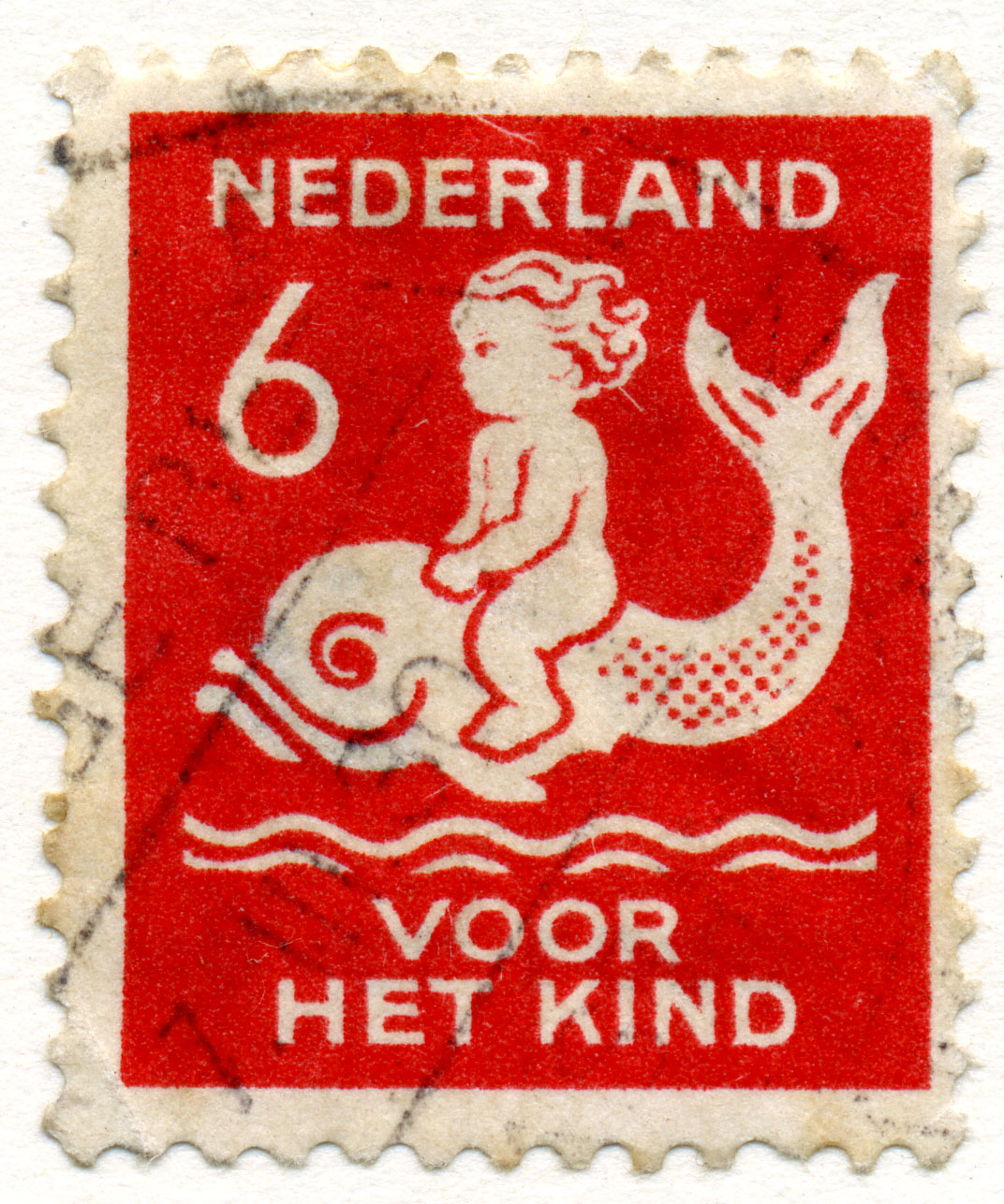
6 cents stamp for the child, 1929

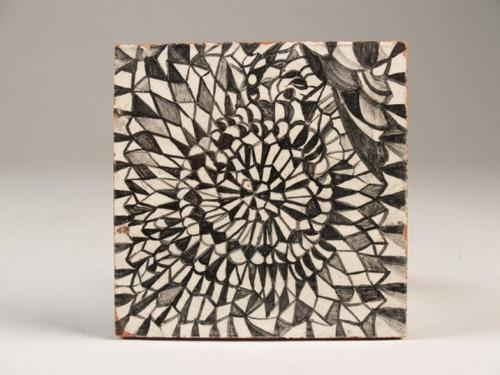
Tile with geometric motif, 1953

In 1953 Kamerlingh Onnes with Bert Nienhuis Piet Wiegman, Dirk Hubers and Frans Wildenhain, took part of the exhibition "five contemporary potters" in Museum Boijmans Van Beuningen, which was one of the first museum presentations of modern artisan ceramics in the Netherlands.

== Selected publications ==
- Harm Henrick Kamerlingh Onnes: 80 jaar. Museum Boijmans-van Beuningen (Rotterdam, Pays-Bas), 1973.
- Harm Kamerlingh Onnes, Dirk A. Buiskool (1999). De reis van Harm Kamerlingh Onnes: brieven uit de Oost.
- Willem Baars, Harm Kamerlingh Onnes (2000). arm Kamerlingh Onnes.
