= Bert Nienhuis =

- Born: 14 November 1873; Groningen, The Netherlands
- Died: 26 May 1960 (aged 86); Amsterdam, the Netherlands
- Known for: Ceramics, Jewelry

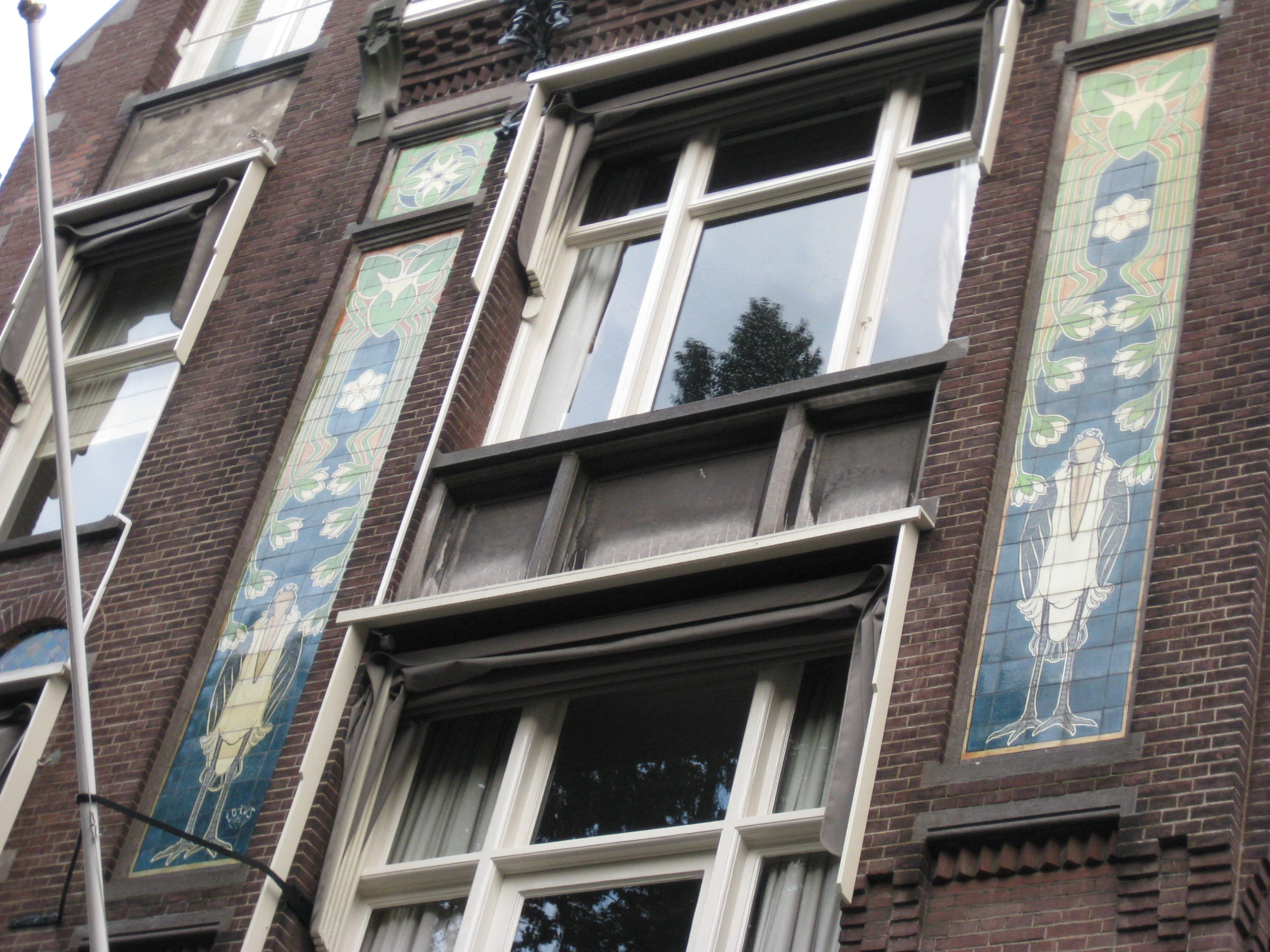
Tile tableau at a house in Amsterdam-South.

Lambertus (Bert) Nienhuis (14 November 1873 in Groningen – 1960 in Amsterdam) was a Dutch ceramist, designer and jewelry designer.

== Life and work ==
Nienhuis was born in Groningen as the son of the broker Lambertus Nienhuis (1834–1890) and Alberdina Good House (1835–1875). He was educated at the Minerva Academy in his hometown and then at the State School of Applied Arts in Amsterdam (Rijksschool voor Kunstnijverheid Amsterdam). In 1895 he worked for the stoneware factories De Distel in Amsterdam. A year later he founded Lotus Tile Bakery in Watergraafsmeer. His company was taken over in 1901 by De Distel, and Nienhuis became in charge of the decorative department. His invention of a matte glaze was quickly adopted by other factories.

From 1905 Nienhuis lecturer at the School of Applied Arts in Haarlem. He began that year with jewelry design for the jewelry firm Hoeker & Son. For one of his designs he was awarded a silver medal at the 1910 World Fair in Brussels. In his early jewelry design, until 1912, Nienhuis used simple abstracted natural ornaments in both the decoration and in the shape. He especially worked with gold, precious stones and enamel work. His ornaments are considered examples of the Dutch Art Nouveau.

In 1912 Nienhuis moved from Haarlem to the German city of Hagen, where he was a teacher at a newly established Kunstgewerbeschule. He got his own studio and plenty of space to experiment with new materials and techniques. He produced ceramic sculptures. In 1916 he returned to the Netherlands, partly because of the First World War. In 1917 he was appointed teacher at Quellinusschool, which he would remain until his retirement in 1934. In this time as an independent potter, he made unica with characteristic simple forms.

In 1953 Nienhuis Dirk Hubers, Harm Kamerlingh Onnes, Piet Wiegman and Frans Wildenhain took part in the exhibition "five contemporary potters" in Museum Boijmans Van Beuningen, which was one of the first museum presentations of modern artisan ceramics in the Netherlands.

The portrait photographer Bert Nienhuis (born 1944) from Amsterdam is a grandchild of Bert Nienhuis.

== Gallery ==
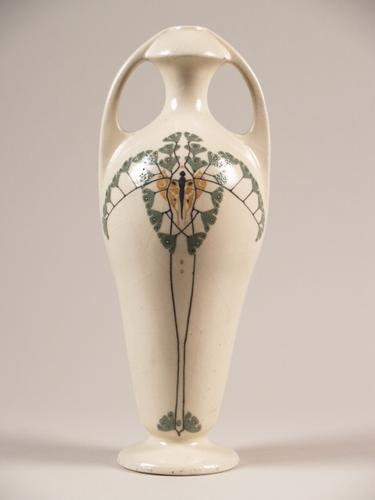
Vase with stylized decor of a butterfly, 1903-10.

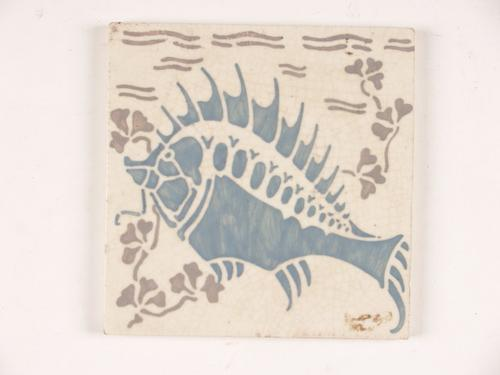
Tile with stylized fish decor, 1905-15.

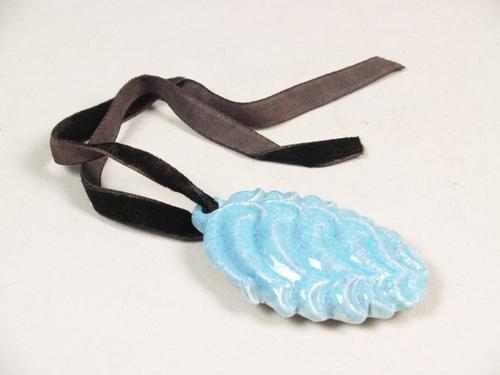
Necklace in the shape of a leaf with a black velvet cord, 1920-30.

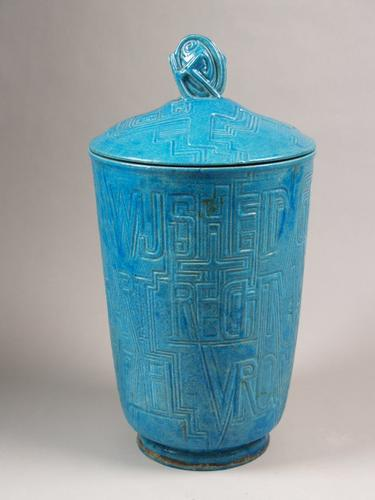
Vase with cover and relief decoration, 1931.

== Work in public collections (selection) ==
- Rijksmuseum Amsterdam
- Princessehof Ceramics Museum

== See also ==
- List of Dutch ceramists
