= Huberts =

Huberts is a Dutch patronymic surname. Among variant forms are Hubers, Hubert, Huibers, Huiberts, and Huijberts. Notable people with the surname include:

- Dirk Hubers (1913–2003), Dutch ceramist active in Belgium
- Jan Huberts (1937–2016), Dutch motorcycle racer
- Shaun Huberts (born 1981), Canadian musician
- Terry Huberts (born 1946), Canadian (British Columbian) politician
- Trees Huberts (1934–2013), Dutch CDA politician
- Wilhelm Huberts (1938–2022), Austrian football midfielder and manager

== See also ==
- Timo Hübers (born 1996), German football defender
