= Piet Wiegman =

Dutch painter

Petrus Cornelis Constant (Piet) Wiegman (Zwolle, 18 April 1885 – Alkmaar, 30 September 1963 ) was a Dutch painter, graphic artist, sculptor, ceramist and puppeteer.

== Life and work ==
Born in Zwolle, Wiegman started worked in the industry in Rotterdam, and moved to Amsterdam in 1901. In 1906 at age 21 he began to paint. Before that he had drawn much. His first paintings show the influence of George Hendrik Breitner. In 1908 he decided to make painting his profession, perhaps under the influence of his brothers Jan Wiegman and Matthieu Wiegman, and he enrolled at the Royal Academy of Arts in Amsterdam, where he however lasted only three full months.

In 1913 he settles down and devoted himself entirely to painting. In 1921–22 he lives with his new wife Janna Formijne in Amsterdam. His art dealer Jan Vecht introduced him in a group of artists, among them Wim Schuhmacher.

From 1922 to 1929 the family lives in Thorn in Limburg. In that period, a lifelong and fruitful friendship grew with Hendrik Wiegersma and his wife Nel Daniëls.. Wiegman also met Constant Permeke, with whom he felt a kinship in the choice of subjects, colors and style of painting. In Thorn he made many woodcuts, he cuts dolls for children and begins to sculpt.

In 1929 they return to North Holland, and in 1938 they move into a house with a studio in Groet. There he becomes one of the members of the Bergen School of art. From 1932 Piet Wiegman also works as a ceramist. During the war period Wiegman couldn't work but after 1945 he recovers in the rise of the Cobra movement. A heart attack in 1950 made it impossible to paint, and limited his energy and concentration. In that year on the occasion of his 65th birthday, there was a retrospective at the Museum Het Prinsenhof in Delft.

In 1953 Wiegman took part of the exhibition "five contemporary potters" in Museum Boijmans Van Beuningen together with Dirk Hubers, Bert Nienhuis, Harm Kamerlingh Onnes and Frans Wildenhain. This exhibition was one of the first museum presentations of modern artisan ceramics in the Netherlands.

== See also ==
- List of Dutch ceramists
