= Bergen school (art) =

1915–1925 movement in Dutch painting

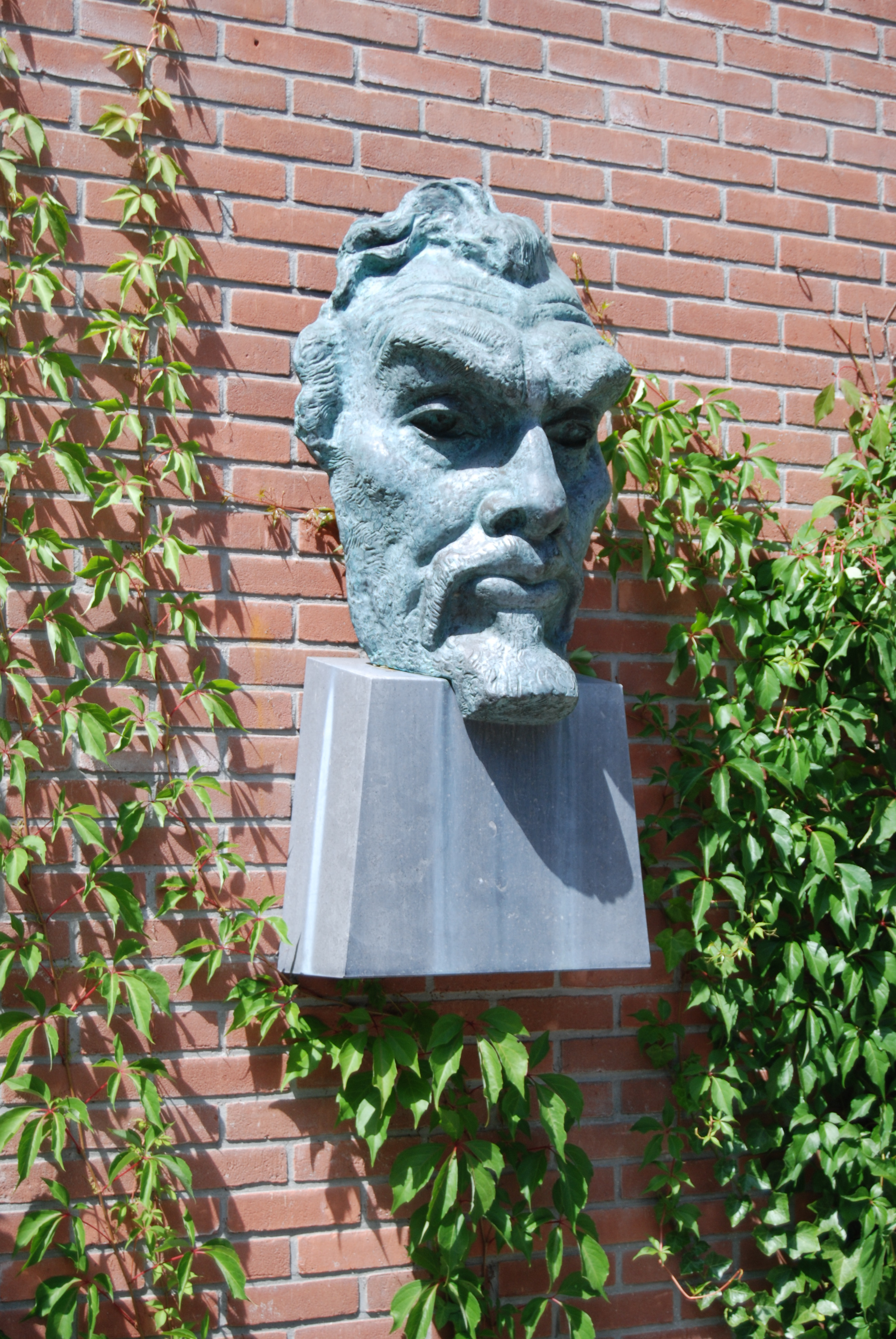
Portrait of Jan Toorop, by John Rädecker, Museum Kranenburgh, Bergen, North Holland

The Bergen school (Dutch: Bergense school) was a movement in Dutch painting which manifested itself between 1915 and 1925. It is characterised by an expressionist style, influenced by cubism and showing a preference for darker colours. The participating artists lived and worked in or near the artist's village Bergen in the province of North Holland.

== Origin ==
A considerable number of artists had already been living or working in Bergen before; thus the village had become known as an 'artist colony'. A majority of painters belonging to the group lived close to each other on the Buerweg, in the neighbourhood Bergen Binnen, which is situated in between Bergen and Bergen aan Zee.

The founders of this movement were the French painter Henri Le Fauconnier and the Dutch painter Piet van Wijngaerdt. They gained many adherents among young painters who agitated against Impressionism, just like Fauvism did in France and Expressionism in Germany. The art theories of the group were largely written down in the magazine Het Signaal (The Signal).

The art historian F.M. Huebner was the first one to write about the Bergen school.

== Characteristics ==
The works of the Bergen school are characterised by figurative depiction with cubist influences, an expressionist touch and in dark colours.

The artists had a preference for painting still lifes and the human figure. The movement was a first original expression of a Dutch movement later to be named Expressionism. Its name refers to the village where the painters established, as is assumed because of its special light.

== Representatives ==
Among the most celebrated artists belonging to this school were Charley Toorop and John Rädecker. In particular the Amsterdam art collector Piet Boendermaker and C.W.N. Baard contributed to the fame of the Bergen school. Other members of the school are: Else Berg, Gerrit van Blaaderen, Arnout Colnot, Dirk Filarski, Leo Gestel, Jaap Weijand, Frans Huysmans, Harrie Kuyten, Kees Maks, Jaap Sax, Mommie Schwarz, Jan Sluyters, Wim Schumacher, Matthieu Wiegman and Piet Wiegman.

Painters whose works are related to the Bergen school are Jelle Troelstra, Henri ten Holt, Bernard Essers, Henk Chabot and Thé Lau.

Painters like Karel Colnot, Jaap Min and Henk van den Idsert belong to a later generation, but started their careers under the influence of the Bergen school.

Museum Kranenburgh in Bergen and the Stedelijk Museum in Alkmaar each own a considerable number of works by representatives of the Bergen school.

== Related movements ==
Henri Le Fauconnier had already in 1912 become a member of the Amsterdam Moderne Kunstkring (Modern Art Circle), together with Fernand Léger and Piet Mondriaan. A few years after the formation of the Bergen school in Groningen another school was formed in 1917 and 1918, called De Ploeg. Jan Wiegers was its central figure. De Ploeg also worked in an expressionist style, but its use of colour was much more exuberant. The group was notably influenced by the German Expressionism of Ernst Kirchner and its social outlook was influenced by the upcoming socialism.
