= Huibers =

Huibers is a Dutch patronymic surname. Huibert is a regional form of the given name Hubert. Among variant forms are Huiberts, Huijbers and Huybers. Notable people with the surname include:

- Bernard Huijbers (1922–2003), Dutch composer and priest
- Jessie Huybers (1848–1897), Australian novelist
- Johan Huibers (born 1958), Dutch creationist who built 2 Noah's Ark replicas
- Johannes Petrus Huibers (1875–1969), Dutch Bishop of Haarlem 1935–1960
- Max Huiberts (born 1970), Dutch football forward
- Peter Huybers (born 1974), American climate scientist

== See also ==
- Huberts
