= Dirk Filarski =

Dutch painter

Dirk Herman Willem "Lak" Filarski (15 October 1885 — 28 February 1964) was a Dutch painter and graphic artist, a representative of the Bergen school. He is primarily known for his expressionists paintings in bright colors.

Filarski was born 15 October 1885 in Amsterdam. His family owned a café for generations. Filarski studied in an art school in Amsterdam, followed in 1903-1907 by the Rijksschool voor Kunstnijverheid, located in the building of the Rijksmuseum. Already during the studies, he had a clear preference for painting landscapes, and since 1907 he was regularly visiting Bergen, where an art colony, later associated with the Bergen school, was forming. He would spend summer months in Bergen, working, in particular, next to Piet Mondrian, Jan Sluyters, and Leo Gestel, and then return to Amsterdam, where in 1908 he first exhibited with the St Lucas artist society.

Filarski travelled a lot and painted en plein air. In 1911, he visited northern Germany and for a few weeks worked at the island of Norderney. In the beginning of 1912 he travelled via Paris to Switzerland where he stayed in Clarens together with his friend, Dirk Smorenberg. In 1913, Filarski's mother died, and he returned for a few weeks to the Netherlands, spending most of this time painting in Drenthe. Subsequently, he returned to Switzerland.u
