= Else Berg =

Dutch painter (1877–1942)

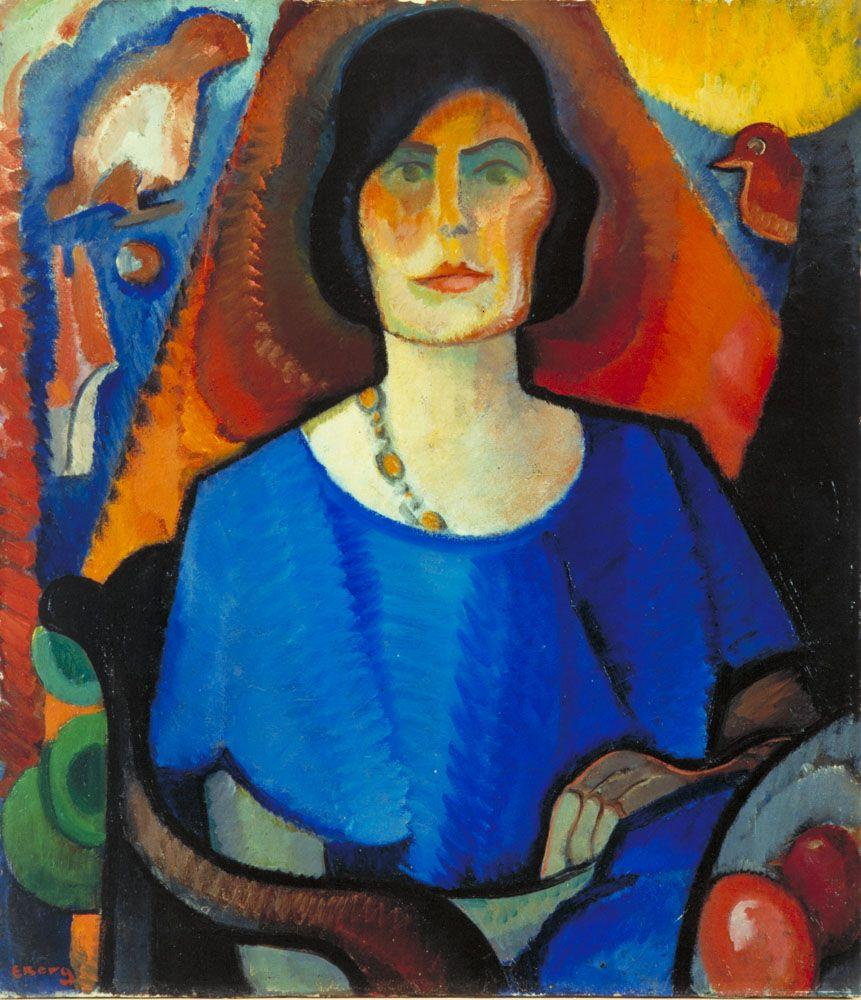
- Self-portrait (1917)
- Born: 19 February 1877; Ratibor, Silesia, German Empire
- Died: 19 November 1942 (aged 65); Auschwitz-Birkenau, German-occupied Poland
- Known for: Painting
- Movement: Bergense School
- Spouse: Mommie Schwarz

Else Berg (19 February 1877–19 November 1942) was a German-born Dutch painter of Jewish descent; associated with the Bergense School. She was married to the Dutch painter, Mommie Schwarz. She and her husband were both murdered in the Holocaust.

== Biography ==
Berg was born in Ratibor, which was then part of the German province of Silesia. Her father was a Liberal Jew and owned a cigar factory. In 1895, she began her studies at the Royal Academy of Fine Arts in Antwerp. Five years later, with the financial support of her parents, she continued at the Berlin University of the Arts, where she studied with Arthur Kampf. According to some sources, she also studied in Paris.

In 1905, she met Mommie Schwarz, who had recently returned from New York and had come to Berlin to study German Expressionism. They went to Paris together to have a look at the latest artistic trends there. The following year, they settled in Amsterdam and became part of the Modern Art movement. For many years, they travelled together, although they kept separate studios. In 1920 they were married and, four years later, she became a naturalized Dutch citizen.

Despite financial difficulties, they continued to travel throughout Eastern Europe, Italy and France. They also had an extended stay on Mallorca, with Leo Gestel and his wife, where they took up Cubism. As the Nazis came to power, many of their friends and family left for England or the United States.

Initially, they felt safe in Amsterdam, but they refused to wear the "Yellow Badge" when it became mandatory and went into hiding in Baambrugge. They were apparently betrayed. In November 1942 they were arrested and sent to Auschwitz, where they were murdered shortly after their arrival.

== Gallery ==
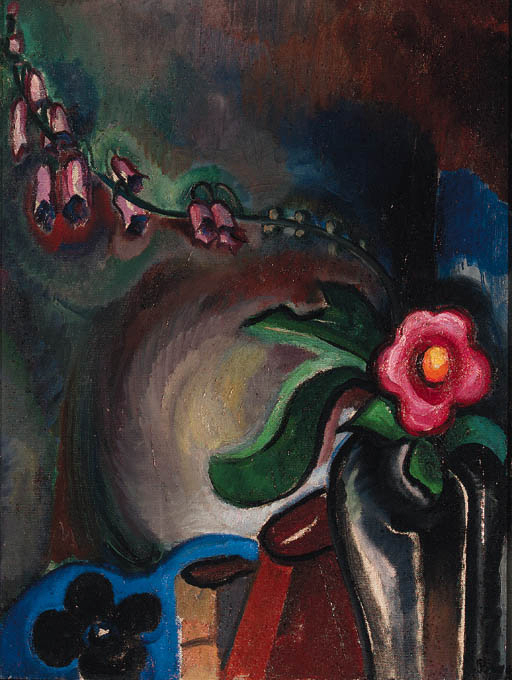
Still-life with Flowers (1916–20)

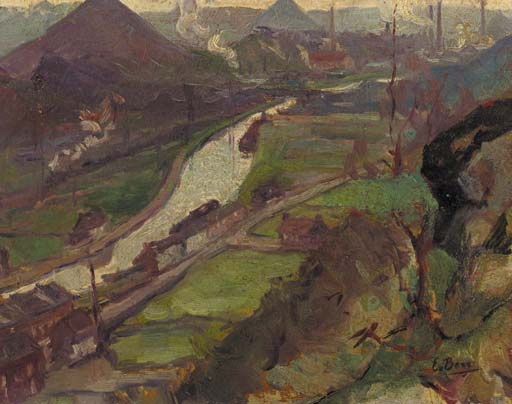
Mining District near Tilleur (c. 1927)

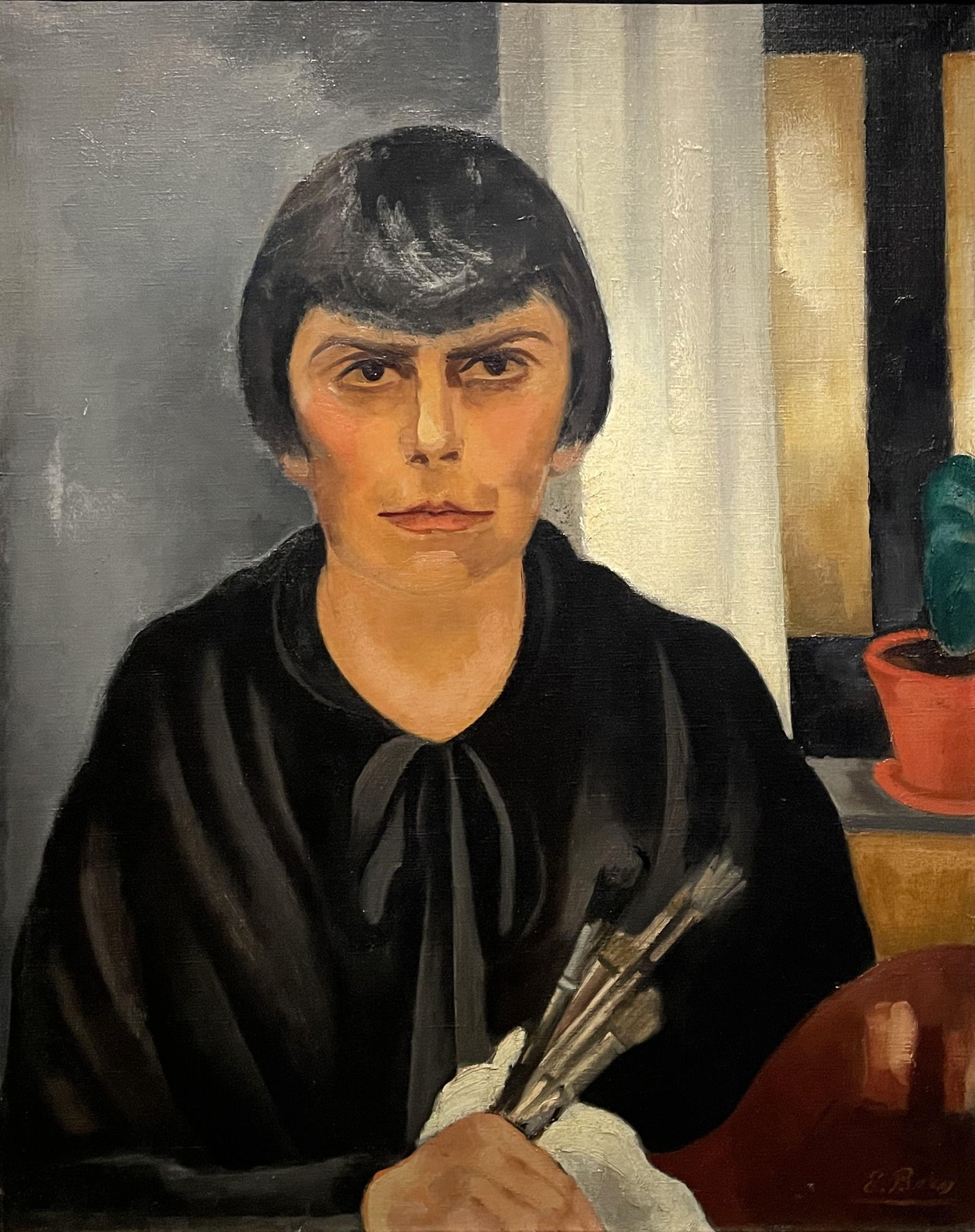
Self-portrait with Brushes (1929)

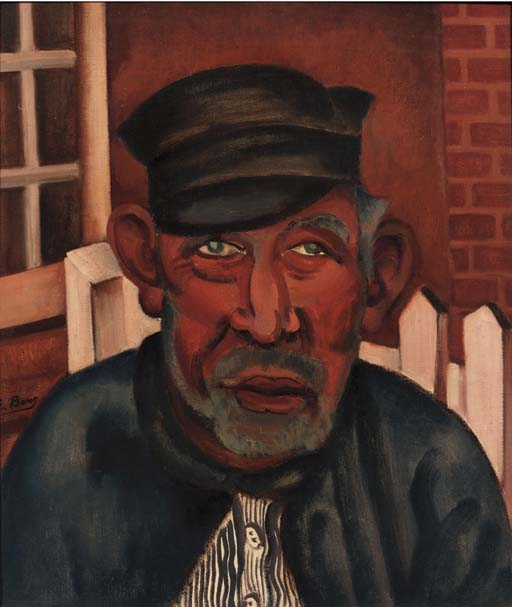
Portrait of a Farmer (c. 1929)

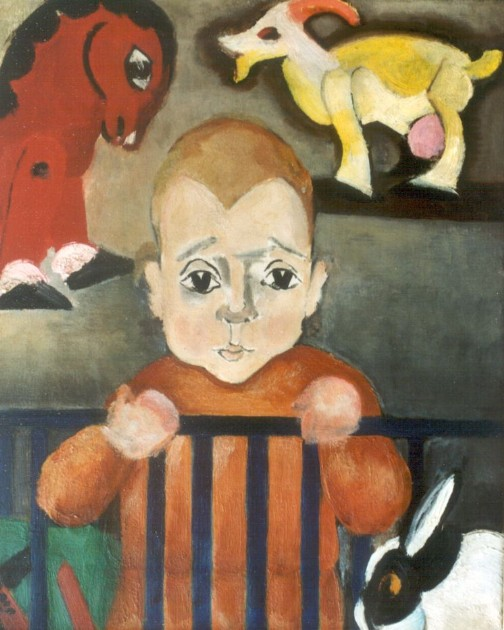
Child with Toy Animals (c. 1930)

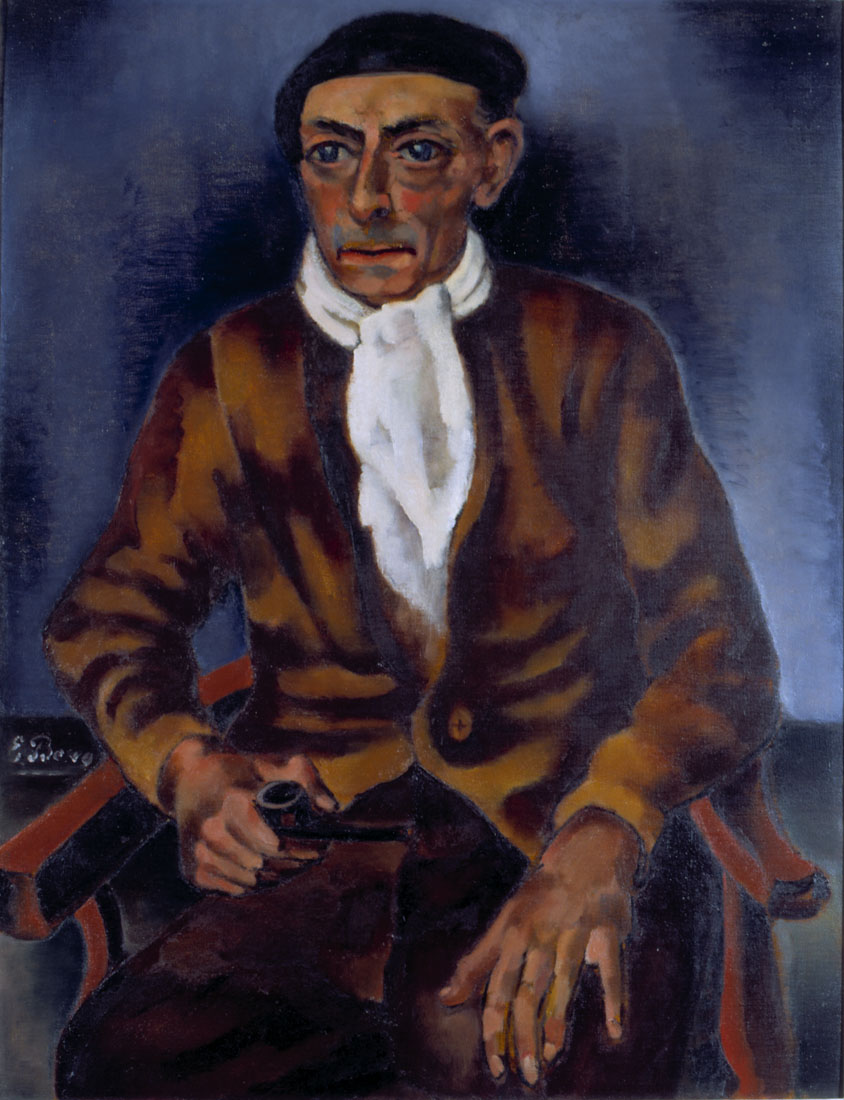
Portrait of Mommie Schwarz (1936)

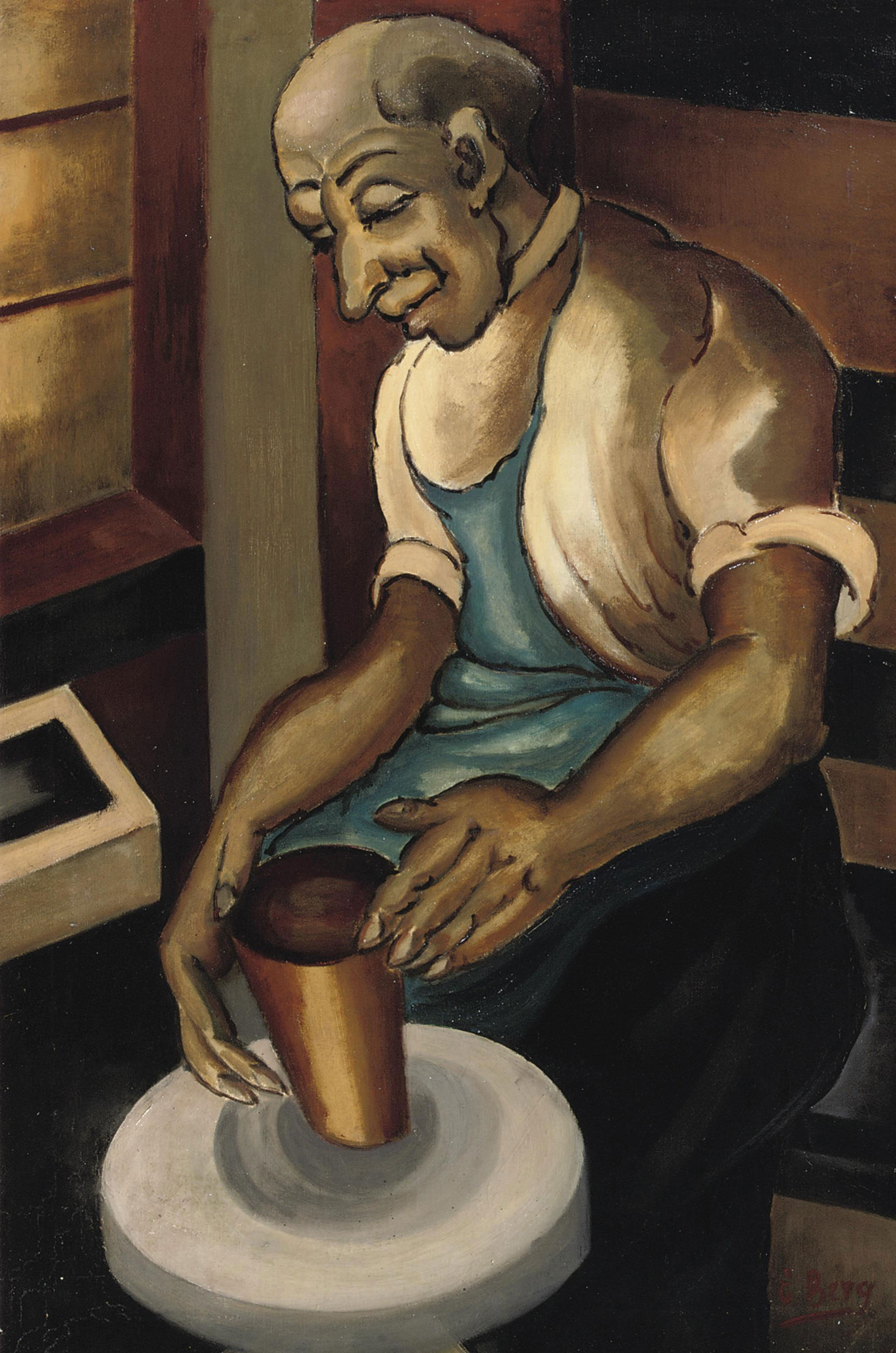
A Potter (by 1942)
