= Kees Maks =

Dutch painter (1876–1967)

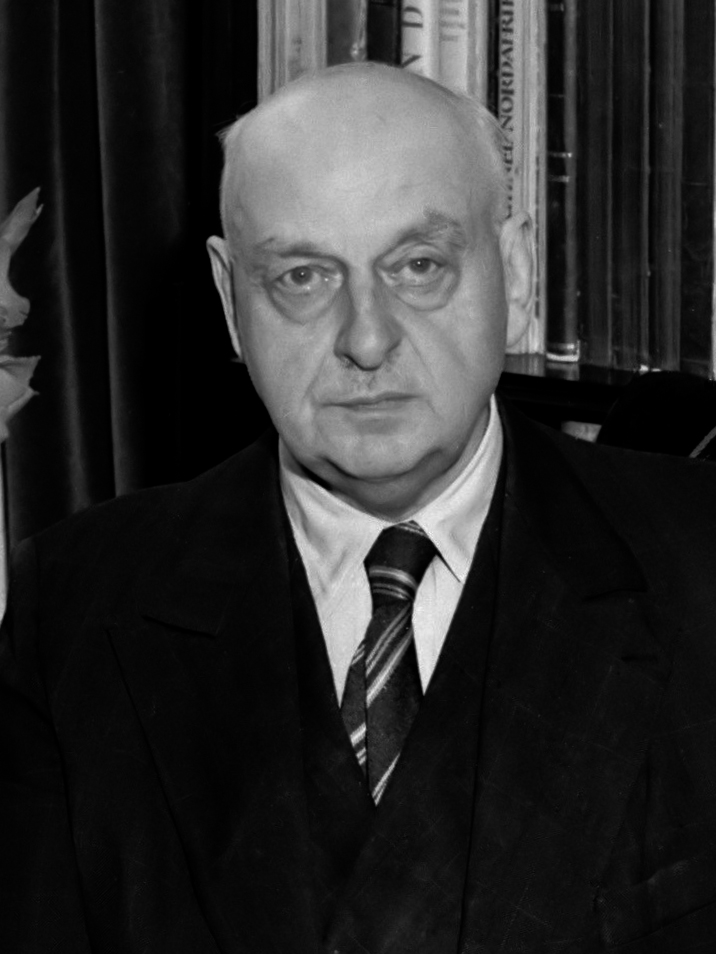
Kees Maks (1946)

Cornelis Johannes Maks (August 22, 1876 – October 28, 1967), known as Kees Maks, was a Dutch painter born in Amsterdam.

He studied for a time at the Rijksakademie in Amsterdam, before becoming a pupil of George Hendrik Breitner. Maks exhibited internationally. He participated in the Munich Secession exhibitions of 1910, 1911, 1912 and 1914; and he exhibited regularly in Paris in the Salon d'Automne between 1910 and 1940. His work was also part of the art competitions at the 1928 Summer Olympics and the 1948 Summer Olympics. Maks' work was included in the 1939 exhibition and sale Onze Kunst van Heden (Our Art of Today) at the Rijksmuseum in Amsterdam.

While in the interbellum the avant-garde spread its influence through Europe, many artists returned to a neo-classical figuration that became known as ‘Retour a l’ordre’. These figurative artists, including Maks and his friend Kees van Dongen, gained considerable popularity, especially in Paris. Maks was known for his paintings of the fashionable night life. Circus acts, dancing couples and garden parties were until then unknown themes in Dutch art. The buoyant subjects and the frivolous way of painting, in simplified masses of bright, strong colors, impressed the public. Together with Kees van Dongen and Jan Sluijters Maks's works were appreciated for their modern character.
