= Dirk Hubers =

Dutch artist (1913–2003)

Dirk Hubers (Amersfoort, 24 September 1913 – Guanajuato, 1 November 2003) was a Dutch ceramist, who lived and worked in Bergen, North Holland and starting in 1958 in the United States. Hubers is notated for being "one of the first to apply abstract graphic designs on his objects."

== Life and work ==
After secondary school Hubert first worked as a clerk, ordinary seaman and farmhand. At a stay in Denmark in 1936 he came in contact with pottery, and learned the fundamentals of the profession. Back in the Netherlands in 1938 he became apprentice at a pottery in Putten. During the war he worked at a pottery in Voorschoten. After the war settles in Bergen where he started his own studio.

Huberts came into prominence in 1953, when with Bert Nienhuis, Harm Kamerlingh Onnes, Piet Wiegman and Frans Wildenhain he took part in the exhibition "five contemporary potters" in Museum Boijmans Van Beuningen, which was one of the first museum presentations of modern artisan ceramics in the Netherlands.

Donhauser (1978) recalled, that "Dirk Hubers and Nicolas Vergette are two examples of potters who, through their distinctive form language, added to the diversity of style and attitudes which comprised the American studio-pottery scene during the 1950s."

Hubert's work is in collections of the Princessehof Ceramics Museum in Groningen and the Centraal Museum

== Gallery ==
Ceramic works

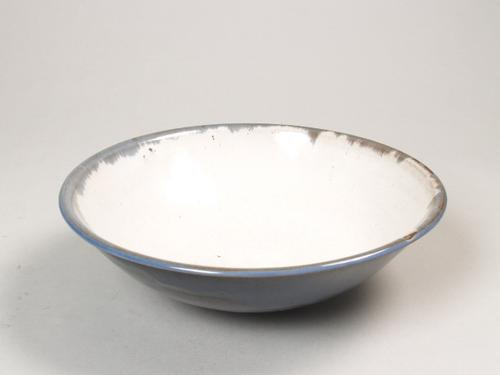
Plate white inside and blue glaze outside, 1940

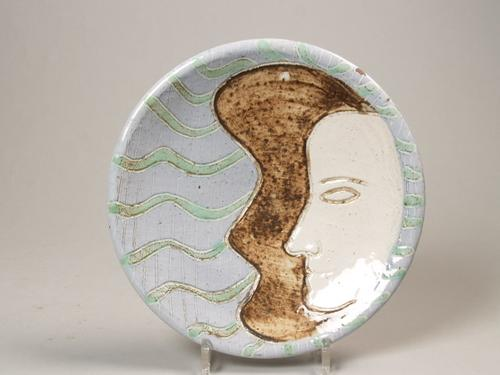
Plate with face in profile, 1933–79

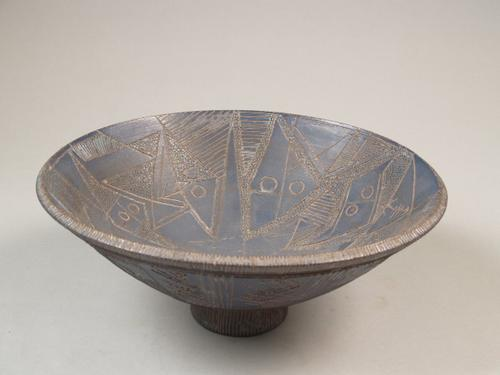
Plate with abstract decoration and circles

Ceramic clock in N.S. Station, Arnhem

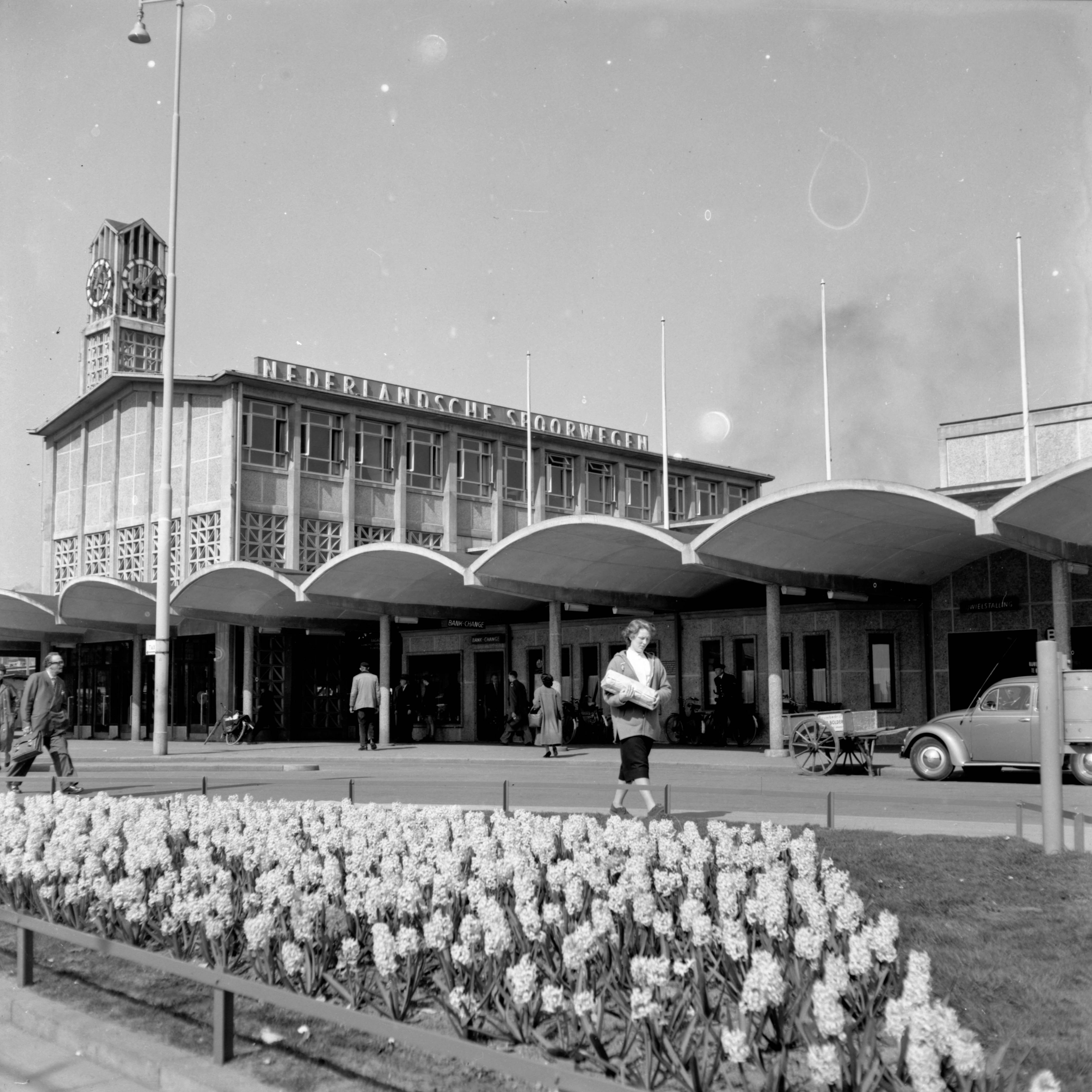

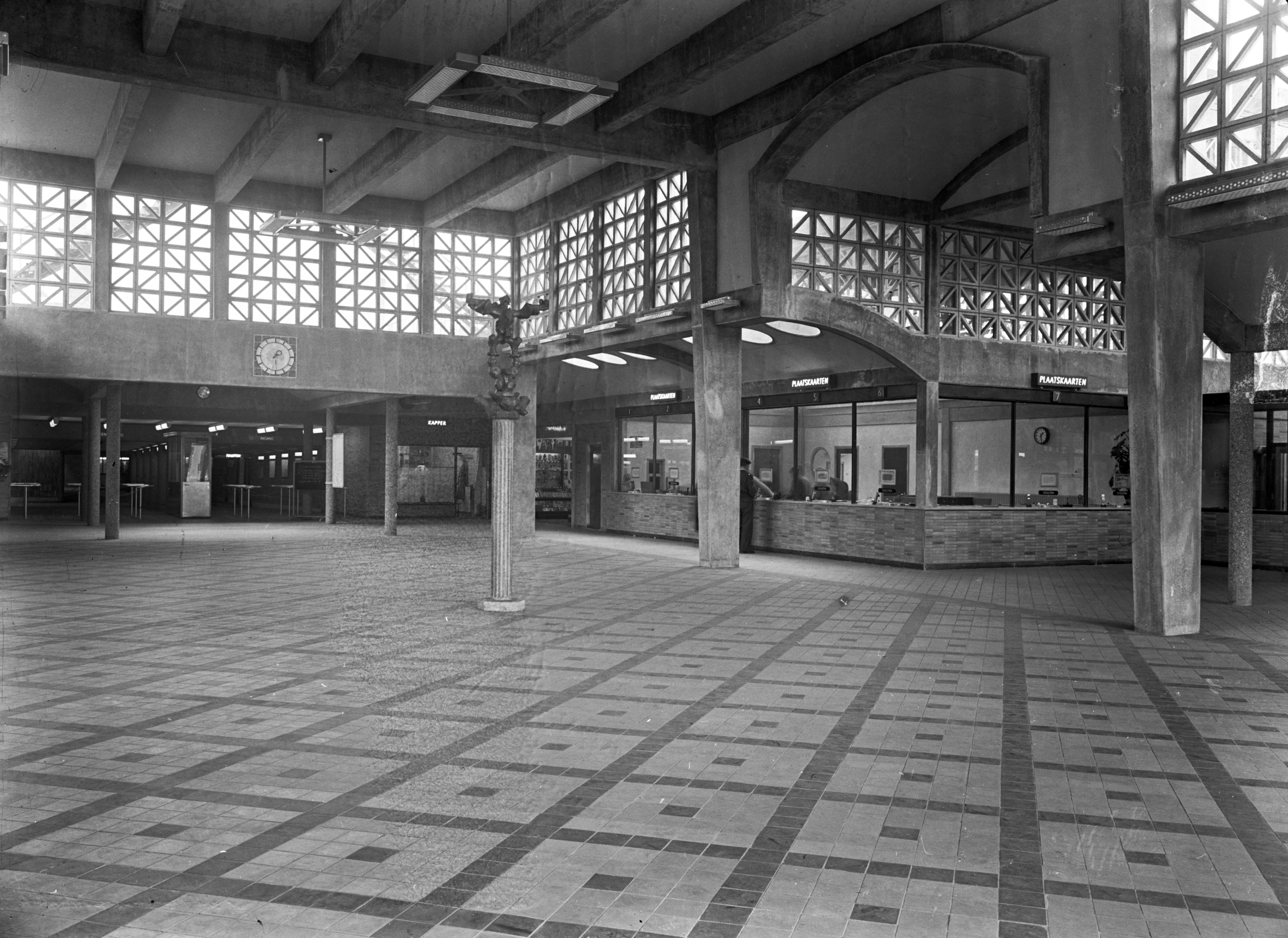

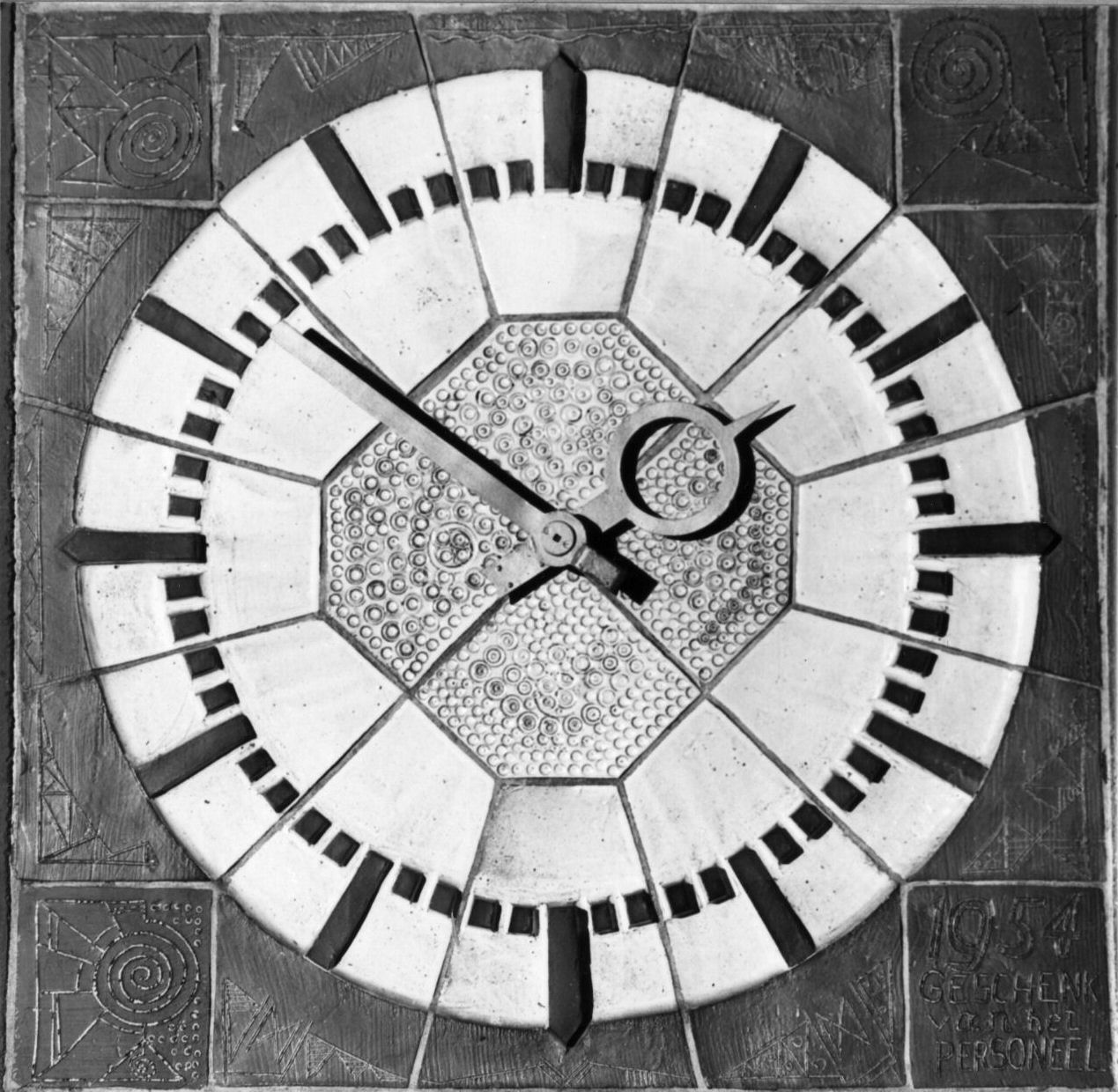

Ceramic sculptures in Adventkerk, Loosduinen

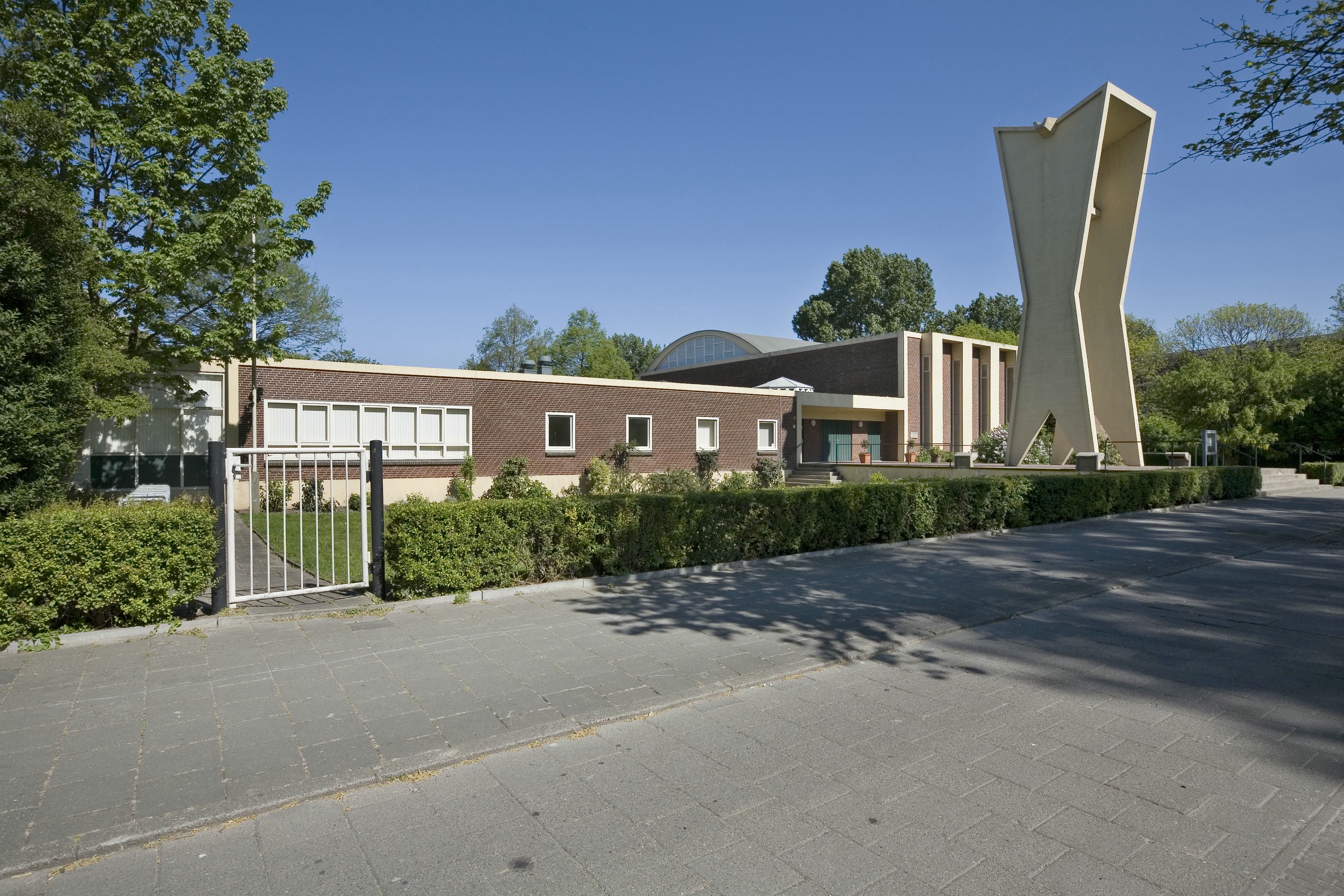
Adventkerk, Loosduinen

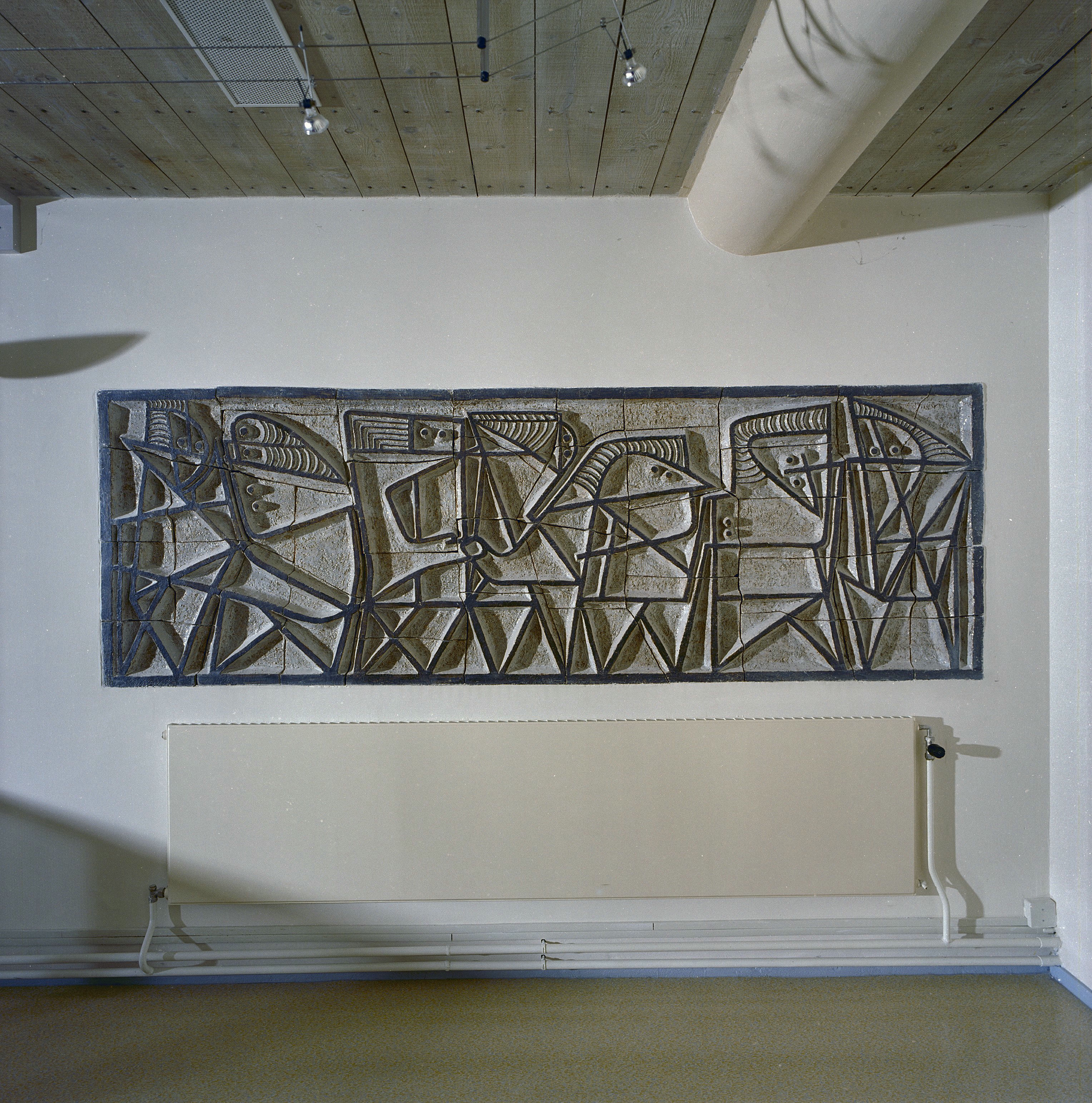
Tile tableau inside

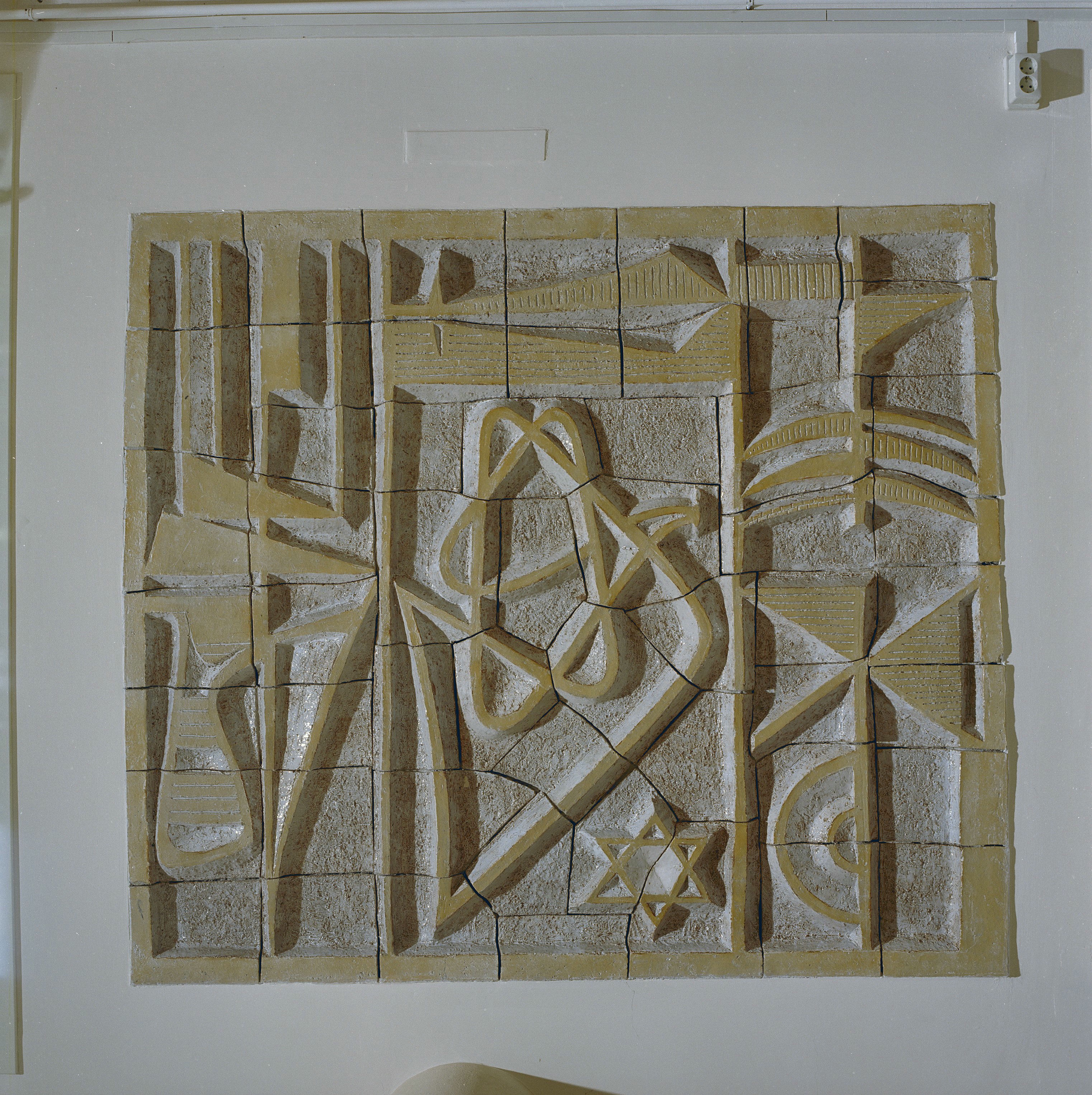
Tile tableau inside
