= Leo Gestel =

Dutch painter (1881–1941)

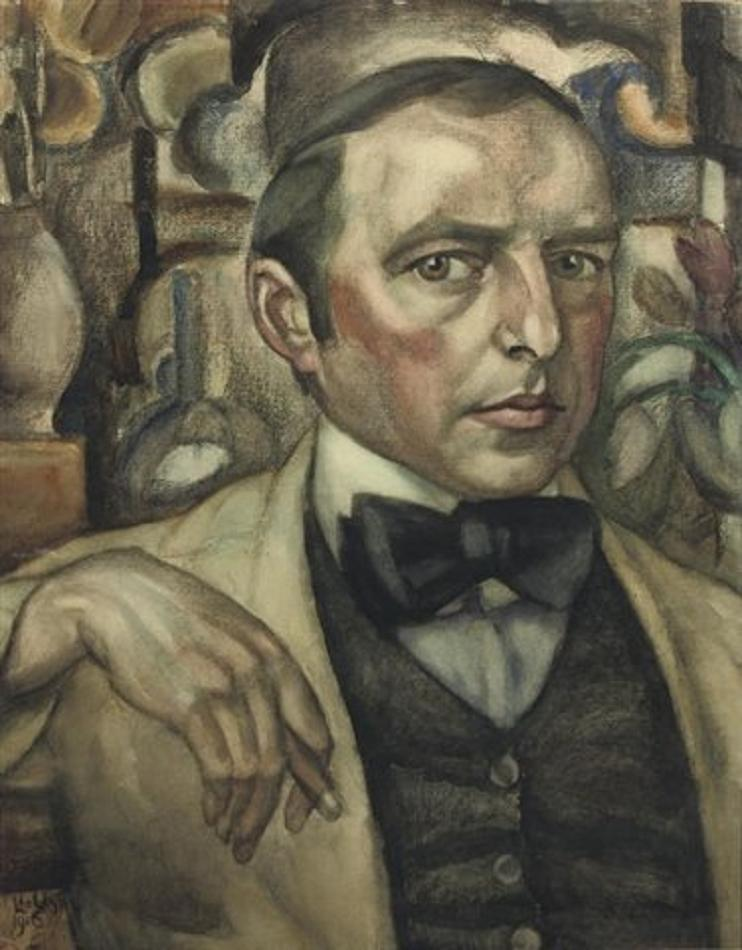
Self Portrait, by Leo Gestel. Pencil on paper, 1913

Leo Gestel (11 November 1881, Woerden – 26 November 1941, Hilversum) was a Dutch painter. His father Willem Gestel was also an artist. Leo Gestel experimented with cubism, expressionism, futurism and postimpressionism. Along with Piet Mondrian and Jan Sluyters he was among the leading artists of Dutch modernism.

== Life ==
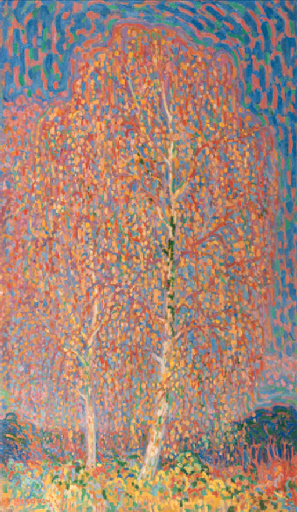
Leo Gestel 'Herfstdag te Nijmegen . Autumn day at Nijmegen, 1909

Gestel was first instructed in art by his father, Willem Gestel, the director of an art school, and his uncle, Dimmen Gestel, who had painted with Vincent van Gogh. Due to financial problems Gestel created advertisements (e.g. for Philips) for illustrated books.

While in Paris he came in contact with the avant-garde movement. In 1913 Herwarth Walden offered him the chance to exhibit work in the "Erster Deutscher Herbstsalon" in Berlin. Generally Gestel spent the summer in Bergen, where he joined the Bergen School. In 1929 the majority of his works were lost when a fire destroyed his studio. He then moved to Blaricum.

== Public collections ==
- Stedelijk Museum Alkmaar, Alkmaar
- Drents Museum, Assen
- Kunstmuseum, The Hague
- Frans Hals Museum, Haarlem
- Singer Laren, Laren
- Kröller-Müller museum, Otterlo
- Museum van Bommel van Dam, Venlo
- Museum de Fundatie in Zwolle
Leo Gestel's works

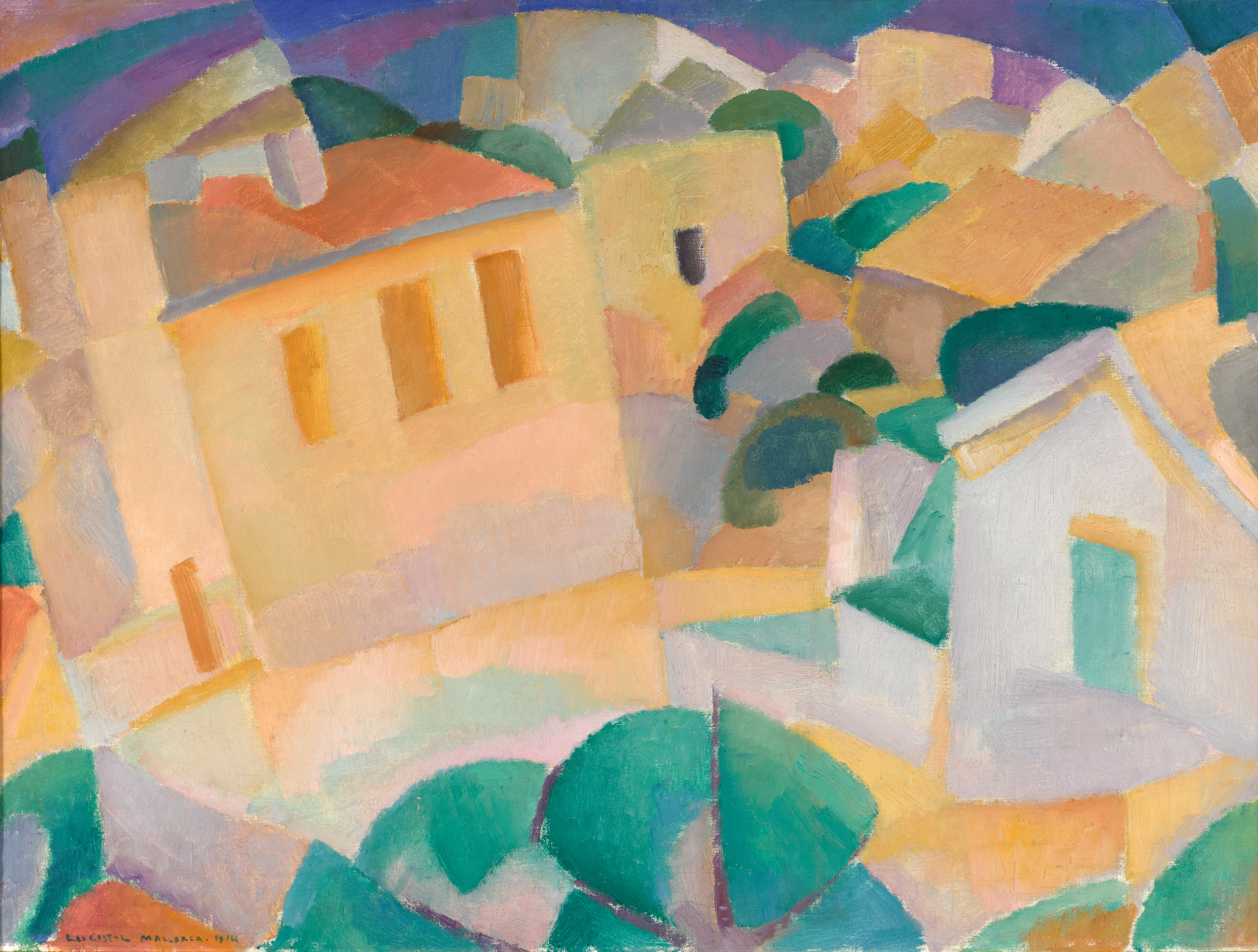
Mallorca, Terreno

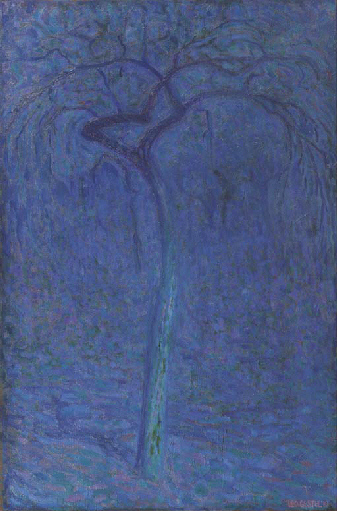
Blue tree

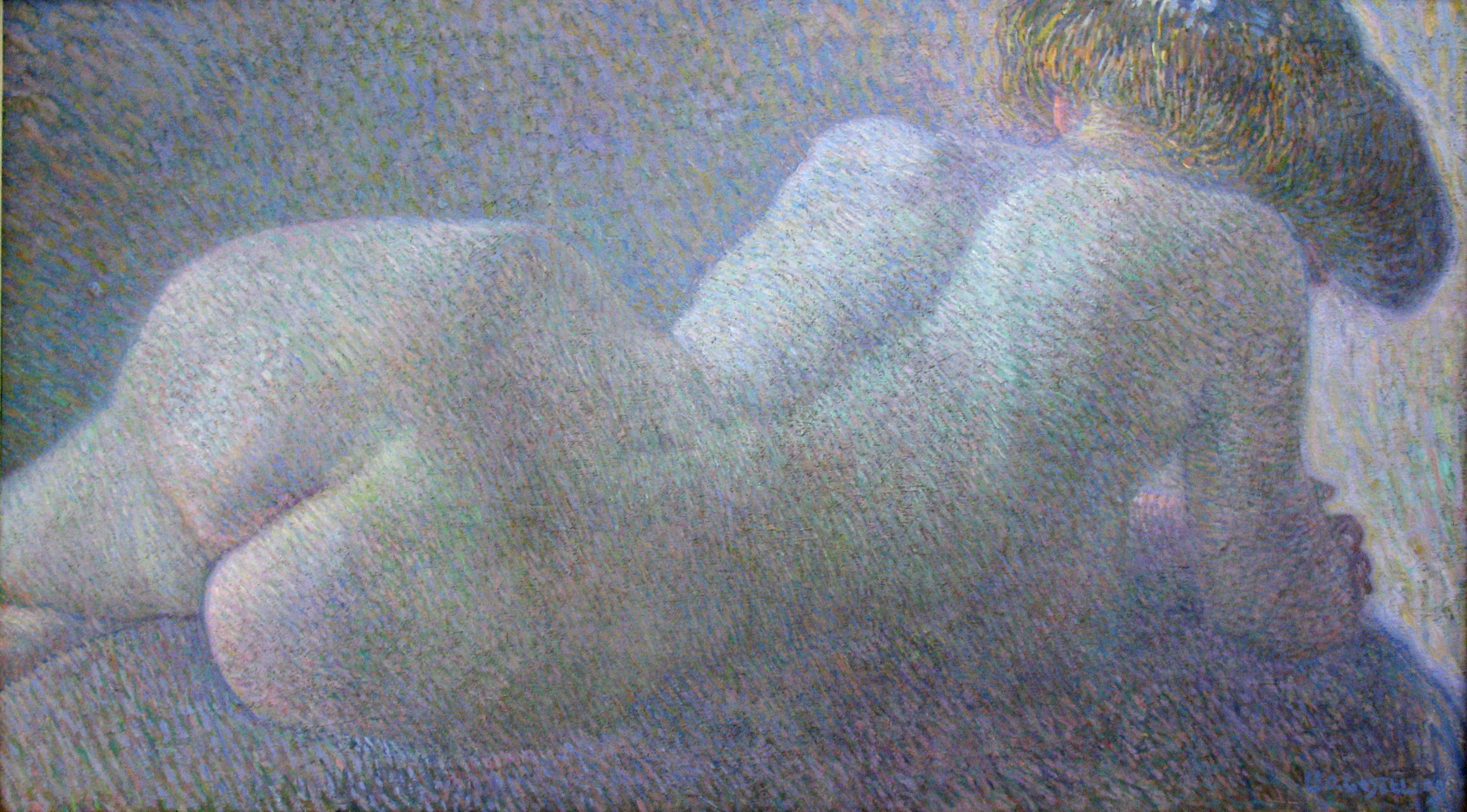
Nude

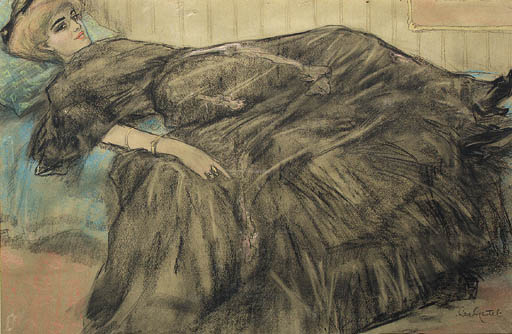
Idle moments

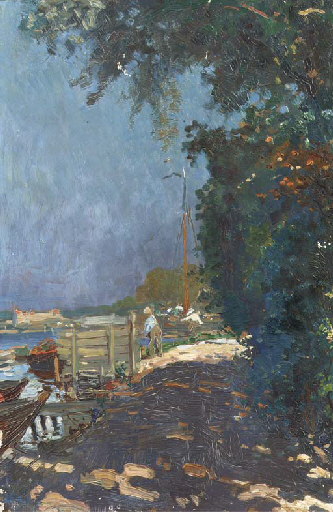
Boats along the shore 1908

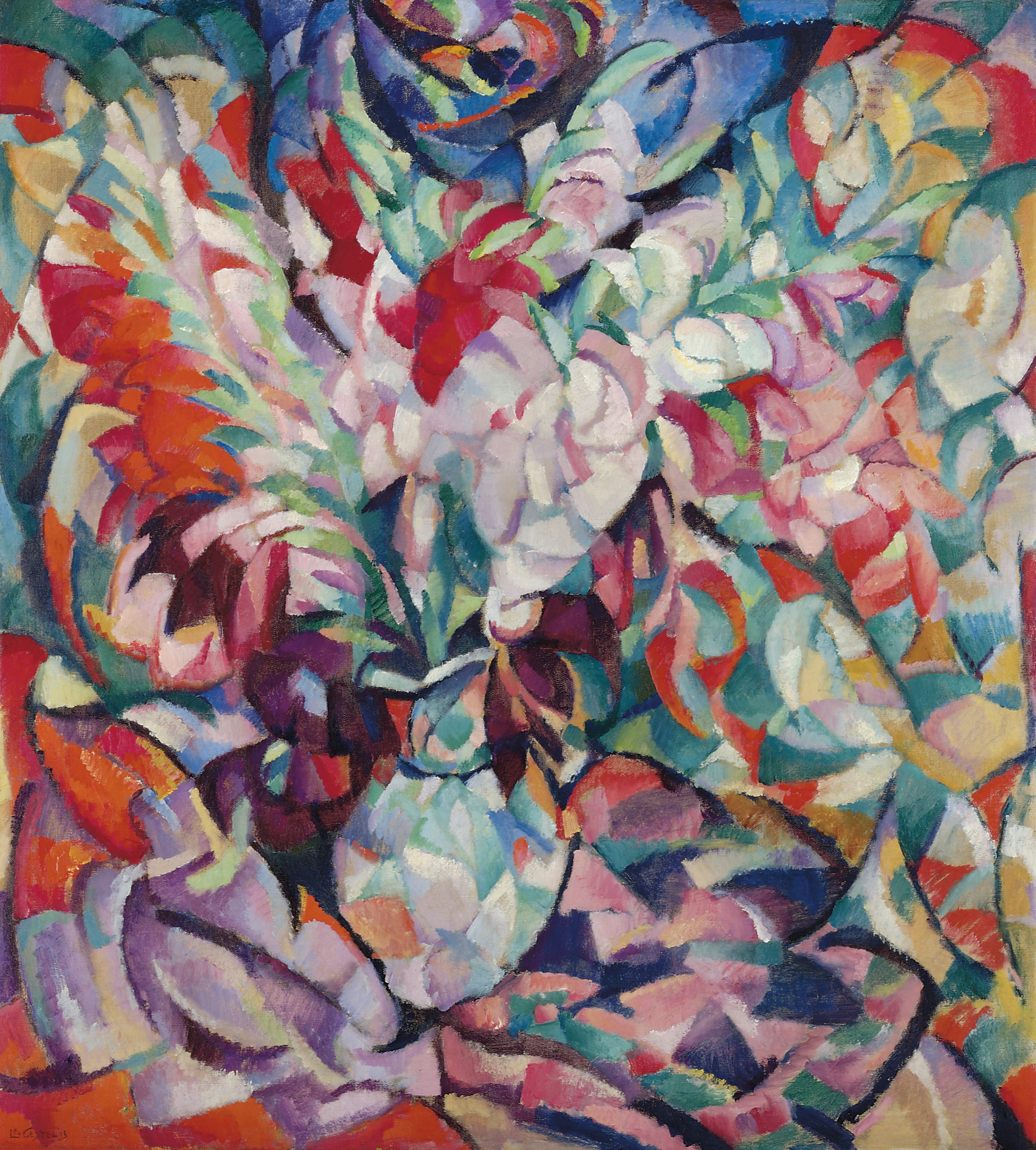
Flowers, 1913

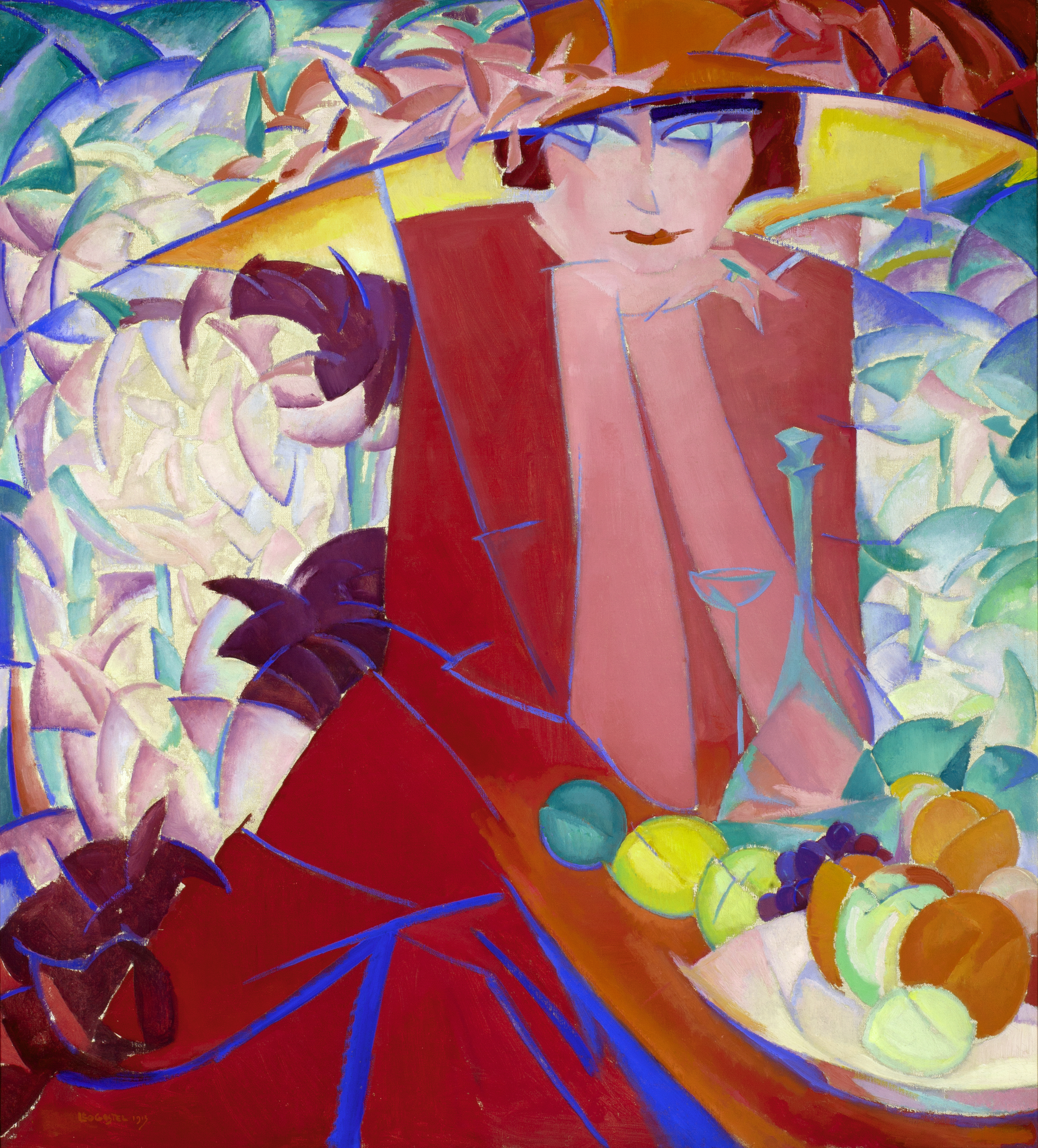
Portrait of Else Berg, 1913

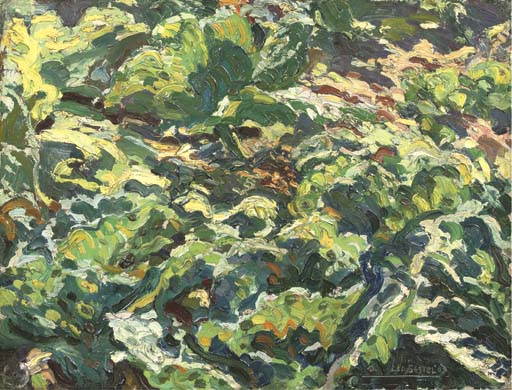
