= Gaatske Adriana Ladenius =

Dutch politician and painter (1883–1953)

Adri Ladenius
- Ladenius in Die onze kracht ontwaken deed (Which awakened our strength), volume 2

Member of the Provincial Council of Overijssel
- In office 1919–1950

Member of the Almelo municipal council
- In office 1919–1941

Personal details
- Born: Gaatske Adriana Ladenius; 29 October 1883 Emmen, Netherlands
- Died: 21 April 1953 (aged 69) Almelo, Netherlands
- Party: SDAP

Gaatske Adriana "Adri" Ladenius (29 October 1883 – 21 April 1953), also known as Adri Leendertz-Ladenius, was a Dutch politician for the Social Democratic Workers' Party (SDAP), campaigner for women's suffrage, painter and illustrator of children's books. In 1919, she became the first woman on the Almelo municipal council and in the Provincial Council of Overijssel.

== Early life and education ==
She was born in Emmen as the third of seven children of Hendrik Johannes Ladenius (1854–1925), a clerk at the subdistrict court (kantongerecht) in Emmen who later became a subdistrict judge in Almelo, and Catharina Elisabeth Beucker Andreae (1853–1950). She was named after her maternal grandmother, Gaatske Adriana Haverschmidt, a sister of the minister and poet François Haverschmidt, who wrote as Piet Paaltjens.

The family was strictly Dutch Reformed and lived in Zuidhorn and Vianen; in Utrecht she attended a Christian girls' school for some time. In 1897 the family moved to Almelo, where she went to the Hogere Burgerschool. Afterwards she spent a year abroad. In 1902 she took lessons at the Dagtekenschool voor meisjes (day drawing school for girls) in Amsterdam, and then studied painting until 1907 at the Academie voor Beeldende Kunsten (academy of fine arts). In 1907 she returned to Almelo.

== Social Democratic Workers' Party ==
Ladenius came to sympathise with socialism, read Het Volk and in 1908 joined the SDAP in Almelo. In the summer of 1909 she became secretary of the local branch, in 1911 its treasurer, and in 1916 secretary of the party's Overijssel region. She spoke at public meetings and set up a women's club. For many years she was also active in the Bond van Sociaal-Democratische Vrouwenclubs (League of Social Democratic Women's Clubs).

During the so-called Tribune affair she signed, with Henri Polak, Carry Pothuis-Smit and Roosje Vos among others, the manifesto of the "48 Marxists". It condemned the stance of the group around the party newspaper De Tribune but also opposed an extraordinary party congress. When the Communist wing split from the SDAP in 1909, she kept her distance from it. In 1913 she was among those opposed to the SDAP taking part in government.

Ladenius wanted the vote for all women and opposed dameskiesrecht ("ladies' suffrage"). She preferred to wait longer for women's suffrage than risk a disguised form of ladies' suffrage being introduced by a liberal-socialist cabinet. For the suffrage movement she drew a series of prints, and she regularly supplied illustrations to De Proletarische Vrouw (The Proletarian Woman), for instance around International Women's Day in 1916. In 1918 she published the pamphlet In den spoortrein. Het belang van de arbeidersvrouw bij de gemeenteraadspolitiek (On the train: the working-class woman's interest in municipal politics). In it, women on a train discuss their worries, such as poverty, poor health care and war, and conclude that the vote for working-class women would be a good thing.

Around 1916 she joined the Nederlandsche Vereeniging tot Afschaffing van Alcoholhoudende Dranken (Dutch Association for the Abolition of Alcoholic Drinks); in 1941 the association marked her 25 years of membership. In the 1918 Dutch general election she was a candidate for the SDAP, in an unelectable position on the list. At the time women could be elected but could not yet vote themselves.

== Municipal and provincial councils ==
In 1919 Ladenius became the first woman on the Almelo municipal council, of which she remained a member until 1941. In the same year she was elected in the provincial elections as the first female member of the Provincial Council of Overijssel. She was thus among the first women in the Netherlands to sit on a provincial council. After her election she gave up her positions on the branch committee and as regional secretary. She remained a member of the regional executive and joined the party council.

On the municipal council she argued for public and secondary education. The council appointed her to the local committee that supervised the secondary schools, and to the board of the Almelo vocational school for girls.

As a member of the Provincial Council she concentrated on public health, social provision and popular education. She made her first speech under any other business (rondvraag) at the meeting of 16 December 1919. In it she asked the provincial executive to investigate how the sick were nursed, in particular people with tuberculosis. Her proposal to found a provincial sanatorium for patients with lung disease brought her into conflict with the Anti-Revolutionary member of the provincial executive Hendrik van der Vegte. He did not see it as a task for the province and preferred a Christian sanatorium founded by private initiative. She paid particular attention to public library provision: she saw the reading of good novels as a remedy for the boredom she noticed above all in the countryside.

Twice she was called to order by the Queen's commissioner A.F.L. van Rechteren Limpurg Almelo. She did not hesitate to interrupt him when she thought it necessary. With his successors she generally got on well. She was always nervous before her speeches in the council, because, as the only woman on the council, she did not want to fail. Until 1948 she had no female colleague on the Provincial Council of Overijssel; in that year the communist J. Broekman-Smit joined her. Her membership was interrupted by the German occupation; she remained a member of the Provincial Council until 1950.

In 1946, as the council's oldest member, she welcomed the new commissioner, J.B.G.M. de van der Schueren. In the same year she was made a Knight of the Order of Orange-Nassau. When Queen Wilhelmina marked her jubilee as monarch in 1948, Ladenius addressed the council. She looked back on half a century in which two world wars had taken place and workers and women had won the vote. Women were not yet well represented in government, parliament, provincial councils and municipal councils, she remarked, "maar misschien komt dat later nog" ("but perhaps that will come later").

== Drawings ==
Alongside her political work Ladenius illustrated children's books. In 2026 the Rijksmuseum held drawings by her, among them a design for a book illustration from a gift by the publisher L.J. Veen.

Bob laat een ballon op vanuit zijn rolstoel (Bob launches a balloon from his wheelchair), c. 1916–1917. Rijksmuseum

Jongen met kind op de rug lopend door zee (Boy walking through the sea with a child on his back). Rijksmuseum

Man redt een kat uit een boom (Man rescues a cat from a tree). Rijksmuseum

Meisje valt van een slee (Girl falls off a sledge). Rijksmuseum

Schaatsers op het ijs (Skaters on the ice). Rijksmuseum

== Personal life and death ==
In Almelo on 1 November 1921 Ladenius married Albertus Cornelis Leendertz (1881–1953), a judge who later became president of the Almelo district court. That he held different political views did not hinder her political activities. The couple had no children.

Her funeral in Almelo was simple but well attended, both by workers and working-class women and by people from her own social circle. Her brother-in-law W. Leendertz, a professor at the Mennonite seminary, led the service.

== Commemoration ==
In 1946 she was made a Knight of the Order of Orange-Nassau.

In Almelo the G.A. Leendertz-Ladeniuslaan bears her name, and in 1986 the Ladeniusmarke in Zwolle-Zuid was named in her honour.
