= Henriëtte van der Meij =

Dutch journalist and feminist (1850-1945)

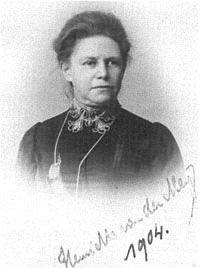
- Born: Henriette Rosina Dorothea van der Meij; 21 December 1850; Harderwijk, Gelderland, Netherlands
- Died: 26 August 1945 (aged 94); Laren, North Holland, Netherlands
- Occupations: Journalist; Editor; Women's rights campaigner
- Parent(s): George David van der Meij (1806-1899); Henriette Rosina Dorothea Costers (ca. 1809-1895)

Henriëtte van der Meij (also Henriëtte van der Mey; 21 December 1850 – 26 August 1945) was a leading figure in the first wave feminist movement in the Netherlands. At least one source identifies her as the first woman to work as a full-time journalist in that country.

== Early life and education ==
Henriette Rosina Dorothea van der Meij was born, the youngest of her parents' five children, in Harderwijk, at that time a prosperous fishing and trading town on the shores of the Zuiderzee (an inland sea subsequently sealed off, partially "reclaimed", and then renamed as the IJsselmeer). The family adhered to the mainstream Dutch Reformed Church. George David van der Meij (1806-1899), her father, was an army officer by profession. Her mother, born Henriette Rosina Dorothea Costers (1822-1895), who was of German descent, exercised a strong influence over her daughter as she grew up in Harderwijk. Van der Meij herself never married.

Her childhood was not entirely stable due to her father's profession. At school, her best subject was History, but when the time came to specialise, the focus of her study was on German. She was familiar with the language through her mother who had been born near Münster: the family were still in touch with cousins in Germany which made it easy to spend time with kinsfolk and get used to using the language conversationally. In 1875, she became one of the first women on the Netherlands to receive her "Hochdeutsche Sprache und Literatur im Sekundarbereich" (Note: "Middelbaar Onderwijs voor de Hoogduitse taal en letterkunde" / "secondary school education certificate for High German language and literature") diploma. That was followed in 1876 by a diploma for work as a teaching assistant, and by a full teaching diploma in 1878.

== Career ==
=== 19th-century ===
Between September 1876 and January 1885 she taught German at a girls' secondary school in Goes (Zeeland). There is evidence that she was much loved by her pupils. When she left the position, some former pupils wrote he a letter: "... we will miss the German classes with you ... You are able to understand us better than the other ladies (i e. teachers)" (Note: "... Wat zullen wij de uren Duitsch met u missen... U kunt beter dan een van de andere dames ons begrijpen".) In 1882 she attracted attention by publishing a book, "Deutsche Lesebuch für höhere Töchterschulen", for use in secondary girls' schools. The book used her own original texts, rather than being a mere compilation of extracts from existing anthologies.

Using the pseudonyms "Enrichetta" or "Enrichetta of Itor" she also began to contribute literary criticism to national newspapers and magazines. These included "De Portefeuille", "De Lantaarn", "De Nederlandsche Spectator" and "De Amsterdammer". There were also contributions to "Vragen des Tijds" (loosely, "Current Issues") in which she argued in support of causes such as housing for female teachers and legal protections for women workers.

Her articles did not go unnoticed. Encouraged by Willem Doorenbos, the editor of "De Amsterdammer", she decided to switch from teaching to a full-time career in journalism. On 14 October 1884 the Middelburgsche Courant, one of the oldest newspapers in the country and a longstanding mouthpiece for progressive liberalism, announced the appointment of Henriëtte van der Meij as its new contributing editor, in succession to W. N. F. Sibmacher Zijnen. There had been at least ten other serious candidates for the job: the others were all men. It was not unusual at that time for women to contribute to weekly magazines, but Van der Meij was the first woman in the Netherlands to accept a full-time paid job as a full-time newspaper editor. Her new job meant moving to Zeeland, the south-western part of the country. From the outset her contributions to the newspaper appeared under her own name. That was unusually brazen: normally any woman contributing to a newspaper or magazine would use a pseudonym or a man's name, often that of her husband. More than half a century later, in 1935, Floor Wibaut would recall "the event" ("de gebeurtenis") when the Middelburgsche Courant had appointed a woman as its editor ... there were still plenty of readers of the newspaper who thought it not right. Between 15 December 1884 and 1 September, she worked on foreign affairs ("Algemene Overzichten Buitenland") and in matters involving the arts and literature. As time went on she also deputized for editor-in-chief Van de Pauwert, which meant compiling the official report of proceedings in the provincial parliament for Zeeland. That required her to obtain an official dispensation from the Provincial-Executive on account of her gender.

On 14 July 1889, van der Meij became the first woman to gain membership of the Netherlands Journalists Association ("Nederlandsche Journalistenkring"). A late amendment to her membership card attests to the unusualness of the situation: the printed title "Mr." was crossed out by hand and replaced with "Mrs." Her journalistic work was not restricted to the Middelburgsche Courant. By this time, she was also writing for "De Groene Amsterdammer" (as "De Amsterdammer" was known after 1883 (informally) and 1925 (officially). Her art reviews there were commended as "examples of a fresh new spirit" by the artist-critic Jan Veth. Her political judgements could also be prescient. Writing in "Mannen van betekenis", as early as 1891, she identified the new emperor, Wilhelm II as a "nervous unsettled personality" ("zenuwachtige, rusteloze persoonlijkheid") who could cause international tensions.

In Middelburg van der Meij became part of the politically progressive circle that also included Mathilde Berdenis van Berlekom and her husband Floor Wibaut, C.M. Ghijsen and the young lawyer from nearby Goes, M.J. de Witt Hamer. She probably already knew de Witt Hamer, since soon after arriving in Zeeland she had befriended his sister, Petronella Johanna Witt Hamer (1855-1919). The two women frequently took trips together, and then lived together, first in Goes, later in Middelburg and finally in Amsterdam. While living in Middelburg they caused consternation by attending summer concerts in the gardens of the Schuttershof society, quite unchaperoned. On these occasions they even sat together and took tea. In 1889, van der Meij teamed up with her friend Mathilde Wibaut to set up an organisation for providing warm meals to impoverished school-age children. In 1895 the two of them set up a Middelberg section of the recently launched "Women's Voting Rights Union" ("Vereeniging voor Vrouwenkiesrecht"). Initially she chaired it with Mathilde Wibaut serving as local secretary: after van der Meij moved away in 1896 Wibaut took over the chair.

Van der Meij moved to Amsterdam in 1896, accepting an invitation from Jeltje de Bosch Kemper to take over as editor-in-chief at Belang en Recht, a twice weekly feminist news magazine which was the principal publication of the "Vereniging tot Vebetering van de maatschappelijke Rechttoestand der Vrouw in Nederland" (loosely, "Association for the Improvement of the Legal and Social Standing of Women in the Netherlands"). The first edition appeared on 16 October 1896. Unfortunately the costs associated with the publication meant that for the first time The Association had to ask members to contribute money. There was a temporary hiatus caused by strike action in 1906, but apart from that, the magazine continued to be published till 1918. The first edition set the tone for what, in retrospect, may be taken as a relatively measured form of feminism. Both women and men worked on the publication. Van der Meij placed the demanded for general voting rights for both men and women at the centre of the magazine's political agenda, also promoting labour rights for women. The influential left-wing commentator Pieter Jelles Troelstra wrote appreciatively about Belang en Recht under van der Meij's editorship. Others were less supportive: the feminist journal Evolutie was fiercely hostile, accusing van der Meij of being a Social Democrat, which in the context of those times was an unvarnished accusation of political extremism. In fact, as long as she was working on Belang en Recht, van der Meij never openly joined the Social Democrat Workers' Party, though the matter was one with which she struggled. Similar inner tensions existed for her over whether to support the "Honger en Schrik" committee that emerged to support the victims of harsh anti-Socialist judicial decisions in Friesland. Around this time, she became good friends with Jo van Gogh-Bonger, widow of Theo van Gogh and sister-in-law of Vincent van Gogh, whose work she tirelessly promoted. Van Gogh-Bonger wrote reviews in feminist publications with which Van der Meij was involved.

=== 20th-century ===
In December 1902 she consulted Henriette Roland Holst: she received (and followed) the advice that it would be wiser not to go public over these matters. Meanwhile, in Amsterdam van der Meij became more closely involved in labour activist groups through the journalist-politician Pieter Lodewijk Tak and Henri Polak. She joined with them to campaign against night working for bakers. She laid the foundations for trades union backed education courses for female workers with the courses she organised in 1897 among members of the "Roosjessnijdsters- en -snijdersvereniging" (jewelry workers' trades union). One of the lecturers, teaching Dutch and Geography, was Carry Pothuis-Smit. For Henriëtte van der Meij these courses were the start of a long-running education partnership with the important "Algemene Nederlandse Diamantbewerkers Bond" (ANDB / Diamond Workers' Trades Union). In 1903, with Pothuis-Smit and support from the "Amsterdamsche Bestuurdersbond" (employers' organisation), van der Meij set about extending the women's education initiative into other industrial sectors including cocoa production, cigarette manufacturing and clothing/hat making. In 1904, organisation of these evening workers' education classes was taken over by the "Bond van Sociaal-Democratische Vrouwenclubs" and van der Meij withdrew into the background.

Although she herself never married, and despite her campaigning for equal workplace rights for women, van der Meij believed that marriage and motherhood were among the highest callings. That lay behind her promotion of women's education. Despite a personal dislike of public speaking she also allowed herself to be persuaded to address the International Women's Congress held in Berlin during 13–18 June 1904. (Her invitation came only after she had submitted the lecture text and asked that arrangements should be made for someone else to read it.) Her talk concerned the condition of women factory workers in the Netherlands and her own involvement in campaigns for legal protection of workers. After she had finished there were calls of "wieter, weiter" ("more, more") from the audience. Her advocacy of separate protection for women faced opposition from others, however, such as M.W.H. Rutgers-Hoitsema, who asserted that it risked restricting women's freedom. Many years later, in 1937, Henriëtte van der Meij would look back on that speech in Berlin as one of the most important performances of her life. That speech also increased her network of feminist contacts internationally. Later, in 1904, the socialist pioneer Clara Zetkin asked her to write an article for the women's magazine Die Gleichheit ("Equality") about the movement for political voting rights in the Netherlands.

After the interruption in the publication of Belang en Recht in 1906, van der Meij became a permanent employee of the "Sociaal Weekblad", for which she had already written earlier when it used to appear under the title "Vrouwenarbeid en Vrouwenorganisatie". From 1907, at the request of Henri Polak, she also took regular (well remunerated) work with a weekly column in the magazine of the ANDB under the heading "Social Affairs". She was one of a very small number of contributors who was not a member of the ANDB union. She wrote on matters such as international labour law, trades unions, domestic industry, women's wage levels and child labour. In 1927, by which time she was nearly eighty years old, it was announced that her regular contributions would end, although she would still write for the publication from time to time. Her contributions continued to appear until June 1934.
