= Tonia Stieltjes =

Dutch model and activist (1881–1932)

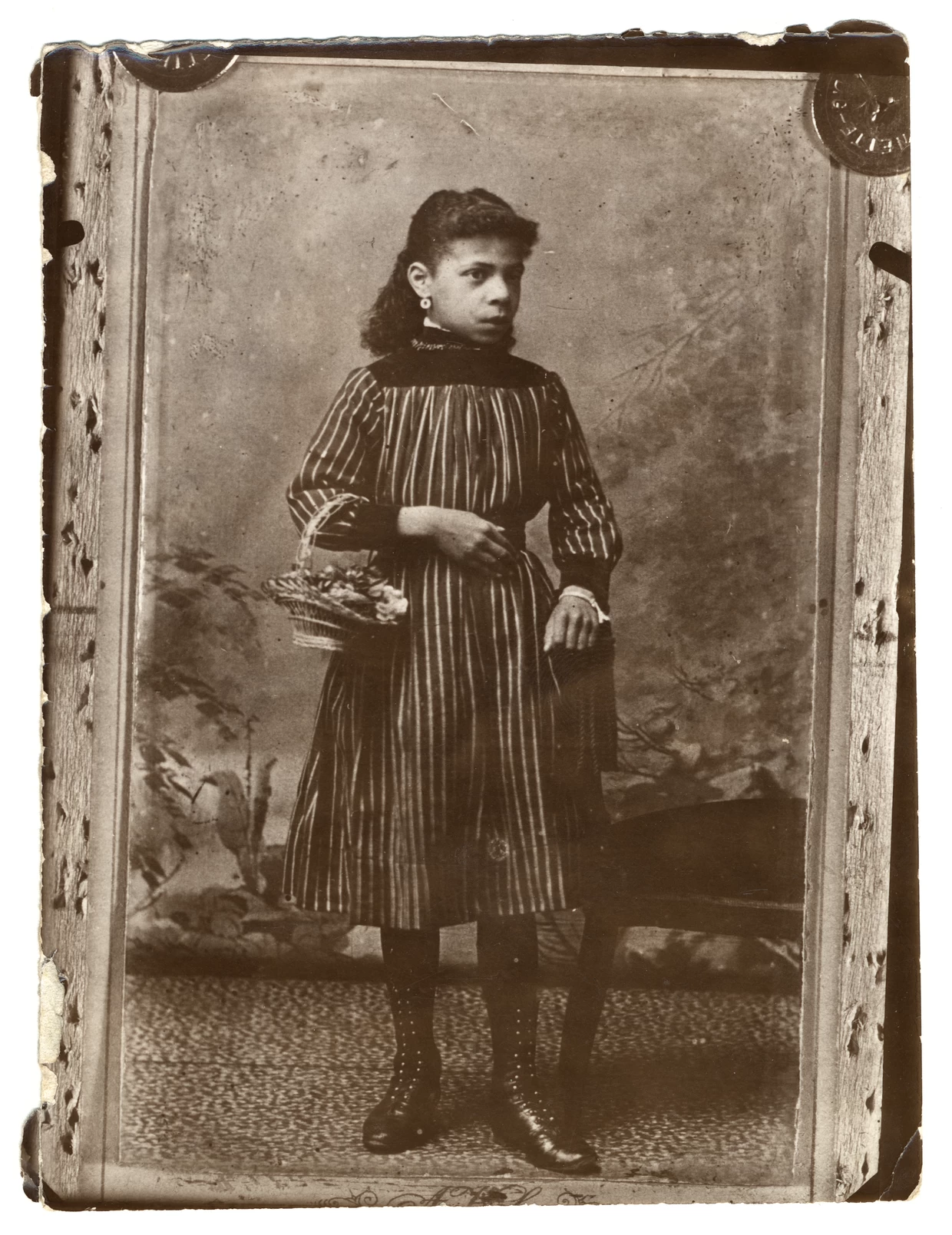
- Stieltjes c. 1896
- Born: Gesina Antonia Milgens; 28 March 1881; Amsterdam, the Netherlands
- Died: 30 October 1932 (aged 51); Paris, France
- Occupations: Model, activist, trade unionist
- Spouses: Jan de Meijere (m. 1908; div. 1915) Wim Stieltjes (m. 1922)

Tonia Stieltjes (born Gesina Antonia Milgens; 28 March 1881 – 30 October 1932) was a Dutch art model, activist, and trade unionist. She has been considered the first woman of colour trade union leader in the Netherlands.

== Biography ==
Born Gesina Antonia Milgens on 28 March 1881 on Czaar Peterstraat in Amsterdam, the Netherlands, she was raised in the Oostelijke Eilanden neighborhood. Her mother, Maria Heidman, was a Dutch maid and her father, Anthony Milgens, was a Surinamese brewer. Her father was born into slavery and was enslaved for 24 years in Suriname. She was born partially blind and attended Amsterdamse Blindeninstituut, a school for the blind in Amsterdam-Zuid. Two of her younger brothers died of tuberculosis and bronchitis as children. Her father died when she was four. By the age of 18, she regained vision in one eye and her other eye was replaced with a glass eye.

In 1904, at the age of 23, she became a maid for the family of Social Democratic Workers' Party politicians Floor Wibaut and Mathilde Wibaut. She became close with Mathilde, who taught her to write. She joined Allen voor Elkander (transl. All for Each Other), a domestic workers' union, and was appointed secretary of the organization. She was soon elected chairwoman of the union's Amsterdam chapter and was known for her public speeches throughout the city. She spoke in favor of causes including women's rights and universal suffrage and contributed to the trade journal Ons Streven. She led efforts to replace the tipping system with a 10% wage increase for domestic servants in the city.

She married photographer Jan de Meijere in 1908; the couple had two children but divorced in 1915 due to de Meijere's promiscuity. She moved to Paris with civil engineer Wim Stieltjes and her two children in 1919. The couple married in 1922. In Paris, she befriended artists including Piet Mondrian, Charley Toorop, Theo van Doesburg, and Jan Sluyters. Wim had received a large inheritance and the couple financially supported multiple artists. She modeled for twelve of Sluyters' paintings.

She died on 30 October 1932 at the age of 51 in Paris due to heart and kidney issues. She was buried in Paris.

== Legacy ==
Artwork depicting her was featured in the 2008 exhibition Black is beautiful. Rubens tot Dumas at the Nieuwe Kerk museum. An exhibition on her titled Tonia - Model en activiste, was displayed at the Singer Laren museum from 2023 to 2024. Art historian Esther Schreuder authored a biography on Stieltjes, titled Tonia Stieltjes: activiste, model en wilskrachtdokter, in 2023. She has been the subject of artwork by modern artists including Iris Kensmil and Brian Elstak.

In May 2025, a public square in Amsterdam, Tonia Stieltjesplein, was named after her.
