= Mathilde Berdenis van Berlekom =

Dutch politician and feminist (1862-1952)

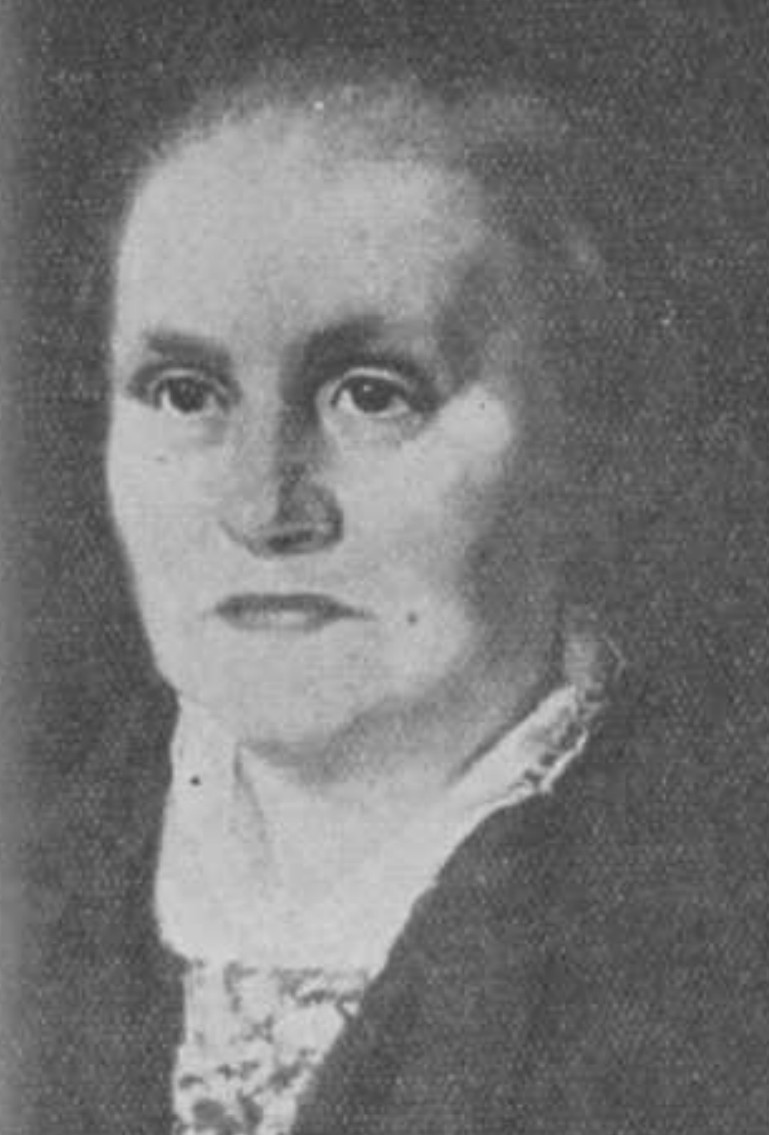
- Mathilde Berdenis van Berlekom
- Born: 14 March 1862; Middelburg
- Died: 22 April 1952 (aged 90); Amsterdam
- Other name: Mathilde Wibaut
- Spouse: Floor Wibaut (m. 1885; died 1936)
- Children: 4

Mathilde Berdenis van Berlekom (14 March 1862 – 22 April 1952), also known as Mathilde Wibaut, was a Dutch politician and feminist. She is best known as the chairwoman of the Union of Social Democratic Women’s Clubs, the women's section of the Social Democratic Workers' Party (SDAP). She was married to Floor Wibaut, the first socialist alderman of Amsterdam.

== Early life ==
Mathilde Berdenis van Berlekom was the third of nine children of physician Johan Pieter Berdenis van Berlekom and Josina van den Broecke. She grew up in a prominent progressive family of doctors in Middelburg, where great importance was attached to pursuing a serious professional education. For that reason, Mathilde attended teacher’s college, where she was the only girl in her class. She then worked for a short period as an assistant teacher at a school in Middelburg before beginning a program to earn her secondary school teaching certificate in Dutch.

== Marriage ==
At the age of sixteen, Mathilde met her future husband and later SDAP alderman in Amsterdam Floor Wibaut at a Multatuli gathering. Instead of getting married immediately, Mathilde insisted on entering into a trial engagement with him first, so she would not have to give up her teaching work. Mathilde would only marry Floor Wibaut on May 6, 1885, when she was 23. During their time in Middelburg, they had four children together—two daughters and two sons. As a timber merchant, Floor Wibaut traveled abroad frequently during this period, so the upbringing of their children fell primarily to Mathilde. After the first ten years of their marriage, Mathilde and her husband began using contraception so that she could focus entirely on her feminist political ambitions, with an emphasis on raising political awareness and fostering the personal development of working women.

== Political Career ==
Mathilde’s political career began with the founding of the Middelburg chapter of the Vereeniging voor Vrouwenkiesrecht in 1895, together with, among others, Henriëtte van der Meij, the first female journalist in the Netherlands. Berdenis van Berlekom herself became its chair. The chapter had over forty members, including Mathilde’s husband and several family members. Under her supervision, club afternoons and discussion evenings were organized for young women. In the early years, these were mainly held at her home and were primarily intended for women in the Middelburg area. At these gatherings, participants could read and discuss a wide range of topics.

In 1904, her move to Amsterdam due to her husband's political career would bring an end to her political and social involvement in Middelburg, but did not stand in the way of her own political agenda. Soon after, together with Carry Pothuis-Smit, Henriette van der Meij, and Liede Tilanus, she founded the first socialist women’s organization, which became known as the Social Democratic Women’s Propaganda Club (SDVC). This Amsterdam-based club was part of the SDAP, through which Berdenis van Berlekom and others advocated for women’s suffrage, women’s financial independence, education for working women, and women’s sexual autonomy. Berdenis van Berlekom served as chairwoman of the SDVC from its founding in 1905 until 1931. Beginning in 1907, this Amsterdam women’s propaganda club began collaborating with other women’s clubs throughout the Netherlands, which would culminate in 1908 with the formation of the Union of Social Democratic Women’s Clubs (BSDVC). By 1908, this federation already had 206 chapters with over 12,500 members. Mathilde also served as chairwoman of the BSDVC until 1935. From its inception, the BSDVC sought to establish an independent position within the SDAP to provide a platform for a wide range of women’s perspectives, and was ojoy recognized as an independent party organization in 1914.

In addition to the emphasis on women's suffrage, the right to paid work for (married) women was also an important theme of the BSDVC. During this period, including within the SDAP, there were frequent calls to restrict or even ban the paid work of married women, which Mathilde opposed. According to her, there were two main reasons for the importance of paid work for women; the economic independence women gained through woek, and increased active participation of women within society. Berdenis van Berlekom also fought for the right of women to decide for themselves when and how many children they wanted to have. She also advocated for a reduction in working hours for men, so that they could help with household chores and raising children. In this way, women could take an independent position within both society and their marriages.

Mathilde also had a clear vision of marriage. Together with her husband, she published the book "Wordend Huwelijk" in 1932, in which they advocated for more freedom for women within marriage, arguing that thanks to women’s growing financial independence, husband and wife could be considered equals within marriage as a result. This book led to much discussion both within the BSDVC and outside of it, and provoked societal opposition due to the couple’s support for the use of contraceptives, their tolerant attitude towards extramarital relationships and their unusual for that time openness in writing about marriage and sexuality.

In the 1920s and 1930s, Mathilde also remained an important advocate for the economic independence of women. For instance, she campaigned against government measures that restricted female work outside the home and sought the dismissal of married female civil servants. At the same time, the emphasis of the BSDVC shifted towards antimilitarism, collaborating extensively with other women's organizations, such as the Women's International League for Peace and Freedom. However, the BSDVC dissolved itself at the beginning of the Second World War, and Mathilde consequently withdrew from politics. It was not until after the Second World War that Mathilde Wibaut became politically active again, joining the Labour Party (PvdA) immediately after its founding in 1946. Shortly before her death in 1952, she wrote her memoirs, in which she discusses the meaning of the socialist women's movement, questioning whether the emancipatory struggle was truly over in 1952. This book would not be published until 1976.
