= Evolution (Mondrian) =

Painting by Piet Mondriaan

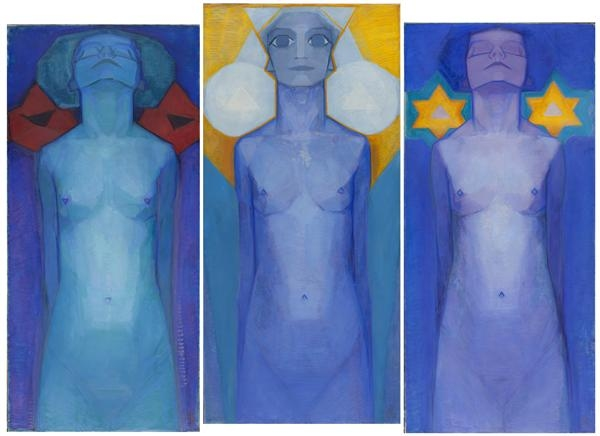
- Artist: Piet Mondrian
- Year: 1911
- Medium: oil paint, canvas
- Dimensions: 183 cm (72 in) × 87.5 cm (34.4 in)
- Location: Kunstmuseum Den Haag

Evolution is an early painting by the Dutch artist Piet Mondrian. It was executed in 1911, after the artist had visited Paris. The painting represents a mid-point in Mondrian's journey from realistic landscapes to radical abstraction. Symbolic in form and with stylised lines, it was Mondrian's last painting where he painted a human form. Soon after Mondrian completed the painting, it was exhibited as part of the first Moderne Kunstring (Modern Art Circle) exhibition at the Stedelijk Museum in Amsterdam.

The artwork is part of the collection of the Kunstmuseum Den Haag. It was loaned to the museum from 1955 to 1971 and was finally acquired by the museum in 1971, as part of a significant bequest from Sal Slijper.

== Condition of Painting ==
Evolution is in extremely fragile condition. Expert research has shown that the painting has been "seriously affected by zinc soap formation, which has resulted in paint delamination and paint loss, particularly in the cadmium yellow paint areas."
