= Diamond Workers' Protective Union of America =

- Abbreviation: DWPU
- Predecessor: Diamond Polishers' Protective Union of America
- Merged into: International Jewelry Workers' Union (IJWU)
- Founded: September 16, 1902
- Dissolved: November 1, 1954 (52 years, 1 month and 16 days)
- Headquarters: 132 Joralemon Street, Brooklyn, NY
- Location: United States
- Key people: Andries Meijer
- Publication: The Diamond Worker
- Affiliations: American Federation of Labor (AFL)

The Diamond Workers' Protective Union of America (DWPU) was a trade union in the United States representing workers in the diamond-cutting and polishing trades. It was organized in New York City on September 16, 1902, originally under the name Diamond Polishers' Protective Union of America. The union's stated aim was to promote the moral and financial welfare of all workers in the diamond-processing industry. It expanded its jurisdiction beyond just polishers to include cutters and setters, reflecting a broader representation within the diamond finishing trades, and by 1903 it took its later name. The union was affiliated with the American Federation of Labor (AFL), the major U.S. labor federation of that time.

== Background ==
The American diamond industry developed as a direct consequence of the overseas expansion of diamond firms of Amsterdam in the Netherlands – the global center of the diamond-processing industry at that time – and their skilled craftsmen, 70 percent of whom were Jewish. The move was prompted by growing international trade pressures. In the 1890s, New York City emerged as the principal center of diamond processing in the United States, following consolidation of control over uncut South African diamonds by De Beers and the London Syndicate of diamond merchants in combination with the adoption of protective U.S. tariff policies.

The McKinley Tariff of 1890 raised import duties on polished diamonds and set stones from 10 percent, as established in 1883, to 25 percent, while maintaining a 10 percent duty on cut but unset stones and exempting uncut diamonds from taxation. The Wilson–Gorman Tariff of 1894 further reinforced this shift by increasing duties to 30 percent on cut diamonds and 25 percent on cut but unset stones, and by imposing a 10 percent duty on uncut diamonds, previously admitted duty-free. Amsterdam diamond companies moved to New York to evade the tariffs in one of the most important markets for their polished diamonds.

These measures – especially the prohibitive tariffs on manufactured diamonds – created strong incentives for importers to relocate cutting and polishing operations to the U.S. and to recruit highly skilled Dutch and Belgian labor with competitive wages. Several Amsterdam firms established branch factories in New York, and by 1894 approximately three hundred Amsterdam-trained diamond craftsmen were employed there. Dutch workers came to dominate the industry, comprising 70 percent of New York's diamond workforce by 1908. Most lived in Brooklyn, with a smaller nucleus in New York City on Nassau Street’s jewelry row.

== The union ==
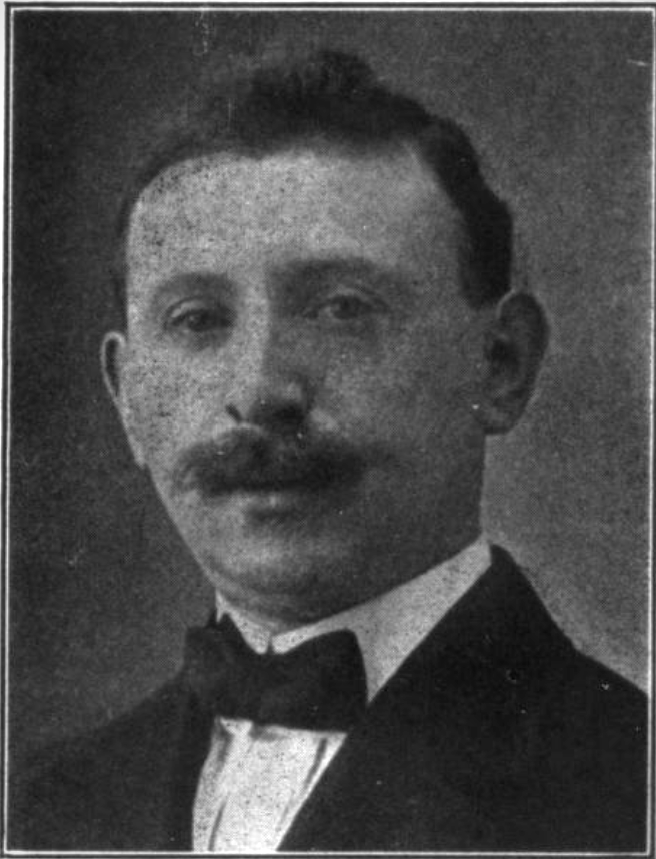
Andries Meijer (also spelled Meyer), president of the Diamond Workers' Protective Union of America (1903–1931)

Almost all of the diamond workers were immigrants from Amsterdam and Antwerp in Belgium, the main global diamond-processing centers at the time. The DWPU's long-time president from 1903 until his death in 1931 was the Dutchman Andries Meijer (or Meyer). Advertisements for diamond workers in The Jewelers' Circular were both in English and in Dutch.

In 1891 there had been an early attempt to form a trade union. The first American Diamond Workers' Association was founded on 29 October 1891 and was affiliated with the AFL; it had approximately 35 members and Jacob Gompers was its chairman. Early attempts to organize diamond workers were hampered by conflicts over the admission of foreign workers from Amsterdam and Antwerp into the American industry by established workers, many of whom had also immigrated earlier.

Another source of tension was the rivalry between the various trades within the industry, such as diamond polishing and the highly specialized field of diamond cutting. While the Diamond Verstellers' Union, composed of setters and helpers, joined the polishers to form the DWPU in 1903, the diamond cutters set up their own union, which initially refused to merge into the new organization.

Due to the international dimensions of the industry, the DWPU joined with European counterparts in May 1905 – the General Diamond Workers' Union of the Netherlands (Dutch: Algemene Nederlandse Diamantbewerkers Bond; ANDB), the Antwerp Diamond Workers' Association (Dutch: Antwerpse Diamantbewerkersbond; ADB) from Belgium and some smaller unions from France and Switzerland – to help found the Universal Alliance of Diamond Workers (UADW), an international federation formed in 1905 in Paris, France, to unite diamond workers' unions internationally. The DWPU had 315 members at that time, while UADW represented 12,410 workers worldwide, most of them in Amsterdam and Antwerp.

== Eight-hour workday ==
In November 1905, the union reached an agreement with the Diamond Manufacturers' Association for an eight-hour workday in the diamond cutting and polishing industry. Compared to workers in other trades, diamond workers enjoyed good working conditions and higher wages, since the trade was a highly specialized niche, and no other workers in the country possessed the skills required for this trade, which demands years of training. Some diamond cutters received up to $80 a week, while polishers could earn $60 weekly. Average wages exceeded $40 per week. (According to U.S. Census data for 1905, the average weekly earnings for male wage-earning workers in manufacturing was about $11.16 per week.)

The agreement was facilitated by the fact that the diamond-cutting industry in the U.S. prospered from its inception until late 1907. Employers' associations and workers' unions negotiated a set of collective labour agreements under which working hours, wage scales, apprenticeship regulations, and nearly all issues likely to give rise to disputes were formally regulated. For matters not explicitly addressed by these agreements, a provision required that disputes be resolved through arbitration. The financial crisis of 1907, commonly known as the "rich man's panic", ended this period of peaceful consultation.

The 1907 panic forced the closure of all American diamond-processing factories and left the entire workforce unemployed. Approximately one hundred diamond workers, together with their families, returned to Amsterdam and Antwerp, where they were promptly re-employed. At the onset of the panic, the American diamond workers' union held a treasury surplus of $27,000. These funds were quickly exhausted in providing relief to members, after which the Dutch ANDB contributed an additional $15,000 for their support. Before the start of the following year, a small number of factories resumed limited operations, and as confidence gradually returned to the business community, production slowly expanded again.

The PDWU sought to safeguard its trade by restricting access for apprentices and foreign workers. In 1909, a dispute arose over Belgian diamond workers detained at the immigrant inspection and processing station on Ellis Island, prompting the United States Department of Commerce and Labor to brand the organization as un-American in nature. This judgment stemmed from the fact that its membership consisted almost entirely of foreigners, and that its strict regulations effectively barred Americans from joining by capping the number of apprentices admitted to the trade at 10 percent of total membership.

== Later history and demise ==
The AFL chartered the DWPU on April 12, 1912, extending jurisdiction over diamond polishing, cutting, and sawing. After a jurisdictional dispute with the newly formed International Jewelry Workers' Union (IJWU) the DWPU absorbed diamond setters affiliated with the IJWU in 1918. Over the next decade, as the U.S. labor movement evolved and other unions expanded, the DWPU became associated with broader organizations. On November 1, 1954, the union merged to become the Diamond Workers Division of Local 1 of the IJWU, (other sources claim December 2, 1955) which by then represented many jewelry and related craft workers. This consolidation reflected broader union trends of merging smaller craft unions into larger industrial unions. At the time of the merger, the DWPU had fewer than 500 members.

Diamond workers' unions across Amsterdam, Antwerp, and New York achieved their gains not primarily through strikes and militancy, but through building strong unions, winning better pay and conditions through incremental organizing and education, projecting collective power through restraint rather than confrontation, and a cooperative relationship with employers that kept industrial peace intact. The mutual respect between employers and unions like the Protective Union of Diamond Workers in the U.S. reflected both a shared occupational identity and a shared interest in maintaining stable, consensual industrial relations.

== Sources ==
- Fink, Gary M. (1977). Labor unions. Westport, Conn.: Greenwood Press. ISBN 0-8371-8938-1.
- Stewart, Estelle M. (October 1926). Handbook of American Trade Unions (PDF). Bulletin of The United States Bureau of Labor Statistics No. 420. Washington DC: Bureau of Labor Statistics, United States Department of Labor.
- Swierenga, Robert P. (1994). The Forerunners: Dutch Jewry in the North American Diaspora. Detroit: Wayne State University Press. ISBN 0-8143-2433-9.
- Van Hinte, Jacob (1928). Swierenga, Robert P. (ed.). Netherlanders in America: A Study of Emigration and Settlement in the Nineteenth and Twentieth Centuries in the United States of America. Volumes 1 and 2 [Nederlanders in Amerika: Een Studie over Landverhuizers en Volkplanters in de 19e en 20ste Eeuw in de Vereenigde Staten van Amerika, Eerste en Tweede Deel]. Translated by De Wit, Adriaan. Grand Rapids, Mich.: Baker Book House (published 1985). ISBN 0-8010-9296-5.
- Wodiska, Julius (1909). A book of precious stones. New York and London: G.P. Putnam's Sons.
