= Liesbeth Ribbius Peletier =

Dutch politician

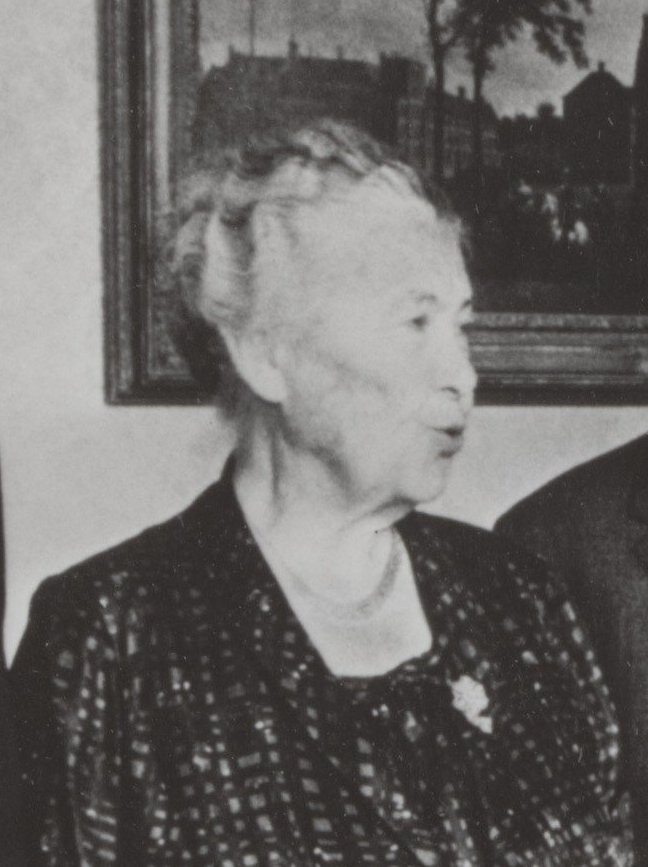
Liesbeth Ribbius Peletier (1965)

Anna Elisabeth (Liesbeth) Ribbius Peletier (July 29, 1891 – September 30, 1989) was a socialist feminist Dutch politician.

== Biography ==
=== Personal life ===
Ribbius Peletier was a daughter of cigar manufacturer Gerlacus Ribbius Peletier (1856-1930) and Adriana Louise Wijbelingh (1863-1939). She studied law at the University of Utrecht. Ribbius became president of the Utrecht Female Student Association (1915) and board member of the Dutch Association of Women with Academic Training (1918). She graduated in 1916 and in 1920 she graduated cum laude with professor C.W. Star Busmann.

After graduating, Ribbius moved to an Amsterdam guesthouse and started working as a volunteer at the Central Bureau for Social Advice. In 1922 she became a state institution and law teacher and deputy director at the School of Social Work. During her studies she was attracted to anarcho-communism. After a study trip through Great Britain, where she came in contact with the Labor Party, she felt more for social democracy. In 1925 she became a member of the Arbeiders Jeugd Centrale, the youth movement of the Social Democratic Party. Shortly thereafter, she was asked by Mathilde Wibaut to apply as a female secretary to the party board. She succeeded Liede Tilanus as secretary-treasurer of the main board of the Association of Social Democratic Women's Clubs. She ensured an expansion of women's work and committed to training work for working-class women. In 1932, thanks to her father's legacy, she was able to buy land in Bennekom, where she founded the De Born training center for working class women the following year.

=== Political career ===
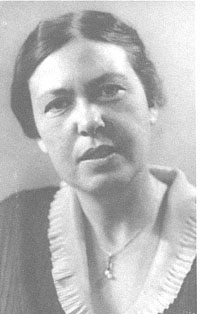
A.E. Ribbius Peletier (ca. 1937)

Ribbius was elected a member of the Provincial States of North Holland (1931-1941, 1946-1958) and appointed as a member of the Senate of the States General (1937-1947). She was a political group spokesperson in the field of justice and social affairs and was responsible for internal affairs. The SDAP was banned by the occupiers during the Second World War. Ribbius kept in touch with the women's clubs at the time, and De Born was able to continue to operate as a private property. After the war, she became a member of the PvdA party council and chairwoman of the women's association. In addition to re-joining the Provincial States, she became a member of the Provincial Executive of North Holland (1946-1958) and was charged with, among other things, healthcare and spatial planning. In 1951 she was a member of the United Nations Commission on the Legal Status of Women. In that year she was named Knight in the Order of the Netherlands Lion. In 1956 she was a UN women's representative and went to the General Assembly of the United Nations to give a speech. In April 1958 she was appointed as the first female member, alongside the Queen, of the Council of State (1958-1966), after which she settled in Scheveningen. At the age of 75, Ribbius resigned as State Council, but she remained involved with De Born.

== Ribbius-Peletier-Medal ==
The "Ribbius-Peletier-Medal" will be awarded for five years from 2019 to a woman who has made herself worthy for the position of women in North Holland politics. The medal was established by the Provincial Council for 100 years of women's suffrage. The first Ribbius Pelletier Medal was awarded to Devika Partiman on March 7, 2019.
