= Universal Alliance of Diamond Workers =

- Alliance Universelle des Ouvriers Diamantaires
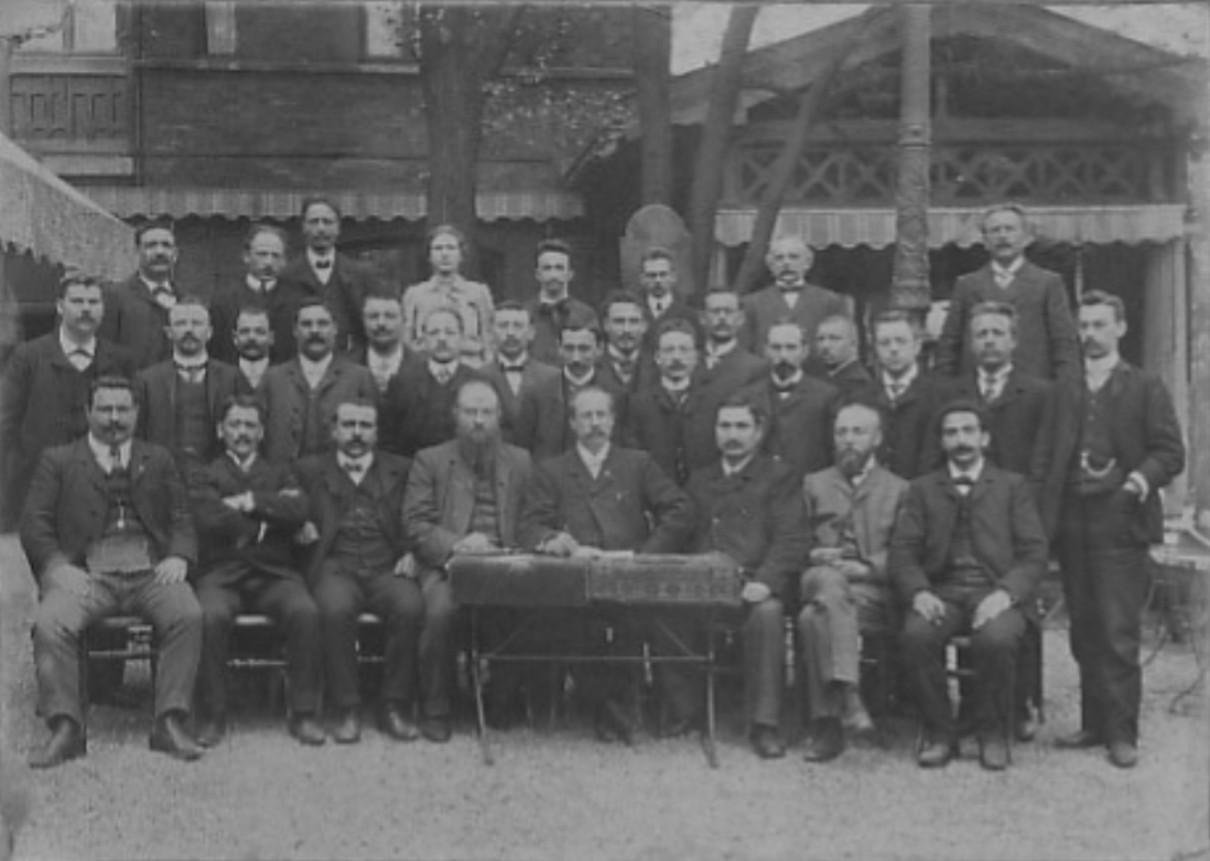
- The founders of the Universal Alliance of Diamond Workers (UADW), 1905. Group photo with, among others, 1st row from left to right: 3rd Jan Bartels, 4th Jan Van Zutphen, 5th Jef Groesser
- Merged into: International Federation of Chemical, Energy, Mine and General Workers' Unions
- Founded: May 23, 1905
- Dissolved: November 1, 2000 (95 years, 5 months and 9 days)
- Headquarters: 66-68 Plantin-en-Moretuslei, Antwerp
- Members: 10,100 (1982)
- Key people: Henri Polak
- Publication: Bulletin
- Affiliations: ICFTU

The Universal Alliance of Diamond Workers (UADW) was a small global union federation bringing together workers in the diamond industry that was founded in 1905. The Alliance focused on improving working conditions, reducing working hours, establishing clearer wages and — above all, to ensure better working conditions — limiting the number of apprentices in the trade. Other objectives of the federation were to provide information on industrial and social conditions relevant to its members and to conduct its own research.

== Background ==
Since 1889, diamond workers’ associations had maintained contact with one another through a series of international congresses (1889, 1890, 1894, 1895, 1897). Initially, participating associations were too weak to do anything significant, until strong modern trade unions were established in the main diamond processing centres, Amsterdam in the Netherlands and Antwerp in Belgium: the General Diamond Workers' Union of the Netherlands (Dutch: Algemene Nederlandse Diamantbewerkers Bond; ANDB) in 1894, and, supported by the ANDB, the Antwerp Diamond Workers' Association (Dutch: Antwerpse Diamantbewerkersbond; ADB) in 1895.

These two trade unions were the driving forces behind the international cooperation. At the international congress in Antwerp in 1897, where the winning of the 10-hour working day was celebrated, a motion was passed deciding in principle to found a world federation, and Henri Polak of the ANDB was appointed international secretary. His task consisted of maintaining regular correspondence between the organizations affiliated with the international secretariat, editing a monthly international bulletin in Dutch, French, German and English, and collecting all kinds of statistics. It was also decided to admit no more apprentices to the diamond trade for the time being, in order to prevent the wages of existing diamond workers from coming under pressure through an uncontrolled influx of workers.

At the 5th International Congress, held on 10 November 1903 at the Bourse du Travail in Paris, France, delegates actually resolved to establish a permanent international trade union, uniting workers’ organisations from the major diamond industry centres of the period. Simultaneously, and in direct connection with this initiative, deliberations took place on organizing collective action to secure a nine-hour working day and on imposing a five-year moratorium on the admission of apprentices to the trade.

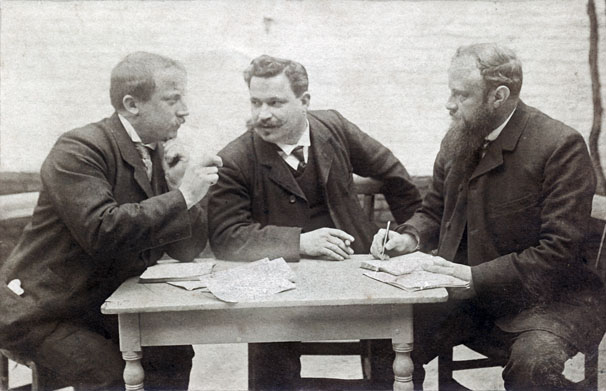
Jef Groesser, Louis Romeo (from the ADB) and Jan van Zutphen (nl) (ANDB) conferring during the strike for the 9-hour workday in 1904

The objective was to defend shared interests across all centres of the industry and to harmonise working conditions as far as possible, thereby denying employers the argument of foreign competition. In early 1904, employers' refusal to concede a reduction in working hours and the forced admission of new apprentices led to a strike in Antwerp, accompanied by a lock-out in Amsterdam by diamond traders and factory owners over the admission of additional apprentices. The prolonged four-months-long conflict ended with the introduction of the 9-hour workday and an agreement on admitting a limited number of apprentices.

== Foundation ==
The conflict underscored the necessity of international cooperation and solidarity. The Universal Alliance of Diamond Workers was formally founded on 23 May 1905 during the 6th International Congress of diamond workers, once again held in Paris, making diamond workers the first in the world to establish a modern international trade union with its own administration and finances. This organisation sought to counter the collective power of jewellers and rough-diamond traders who controlled the prices of raw materials.

The constituent unions were the Dutch ANDB (the largest with 7,500 members) and the Belgian ADB (3,400 members) and several smaller confessional Dutch unions: Betsalel (orthodox-jewish; 205 members), Patrimonium (protestant; 70 members) and St. Eduardus (catholic; 205 members). From France and Switzerland, there were the Chambres Syndicales des Ouvriers Diamantaires in Saint-Claude, Paris, Felletin, Nemours, Geneva and various localities in the Pays de Gex (Thoiry, Divonne, Gex) and from the United States, the Diamond Workers' Protective Union of America (with 315 members) and the separate union of the highly skilled diamond cutters, the United Diamond Cutter's Union (UDCU; 34 members), both from New York and formed by emigrant diamond workers from Antwerp and Amsterdam. In total there were 12,410 members, more than three quarters of those working in the industry. German unions joined in 1907 (440 members in 1913), as did a small London union, the London Diamond Workers' Trade Union.

== Rise and decline ==
Over the years, the Alliance won major advances, including a week of unpaid vacation in 1910 and the eight-hour workday in 1911 across the diamond industries of the Netherlands, Belgium, and France. Unions supported one another by sharing information and assisting members during strikes, lock-outs, and unemployment. In its early years, the Alliance grew, representing 22,700 workers by 1913. From the start, the UADW was shaped primarily by the dominant Dutch and Belgian unions. During the 1920s, rivalry between these two groups eroded internal cohesion, reflecting competition between their diamond industries. Whereas Amsterdam’s workforce stagnated, Belgium experienced rapid growth. This imbalance contributed to a growing disillusionment at congresses, where delegates became increasingly aware that the UADW’s project remained only partially fulfilled.

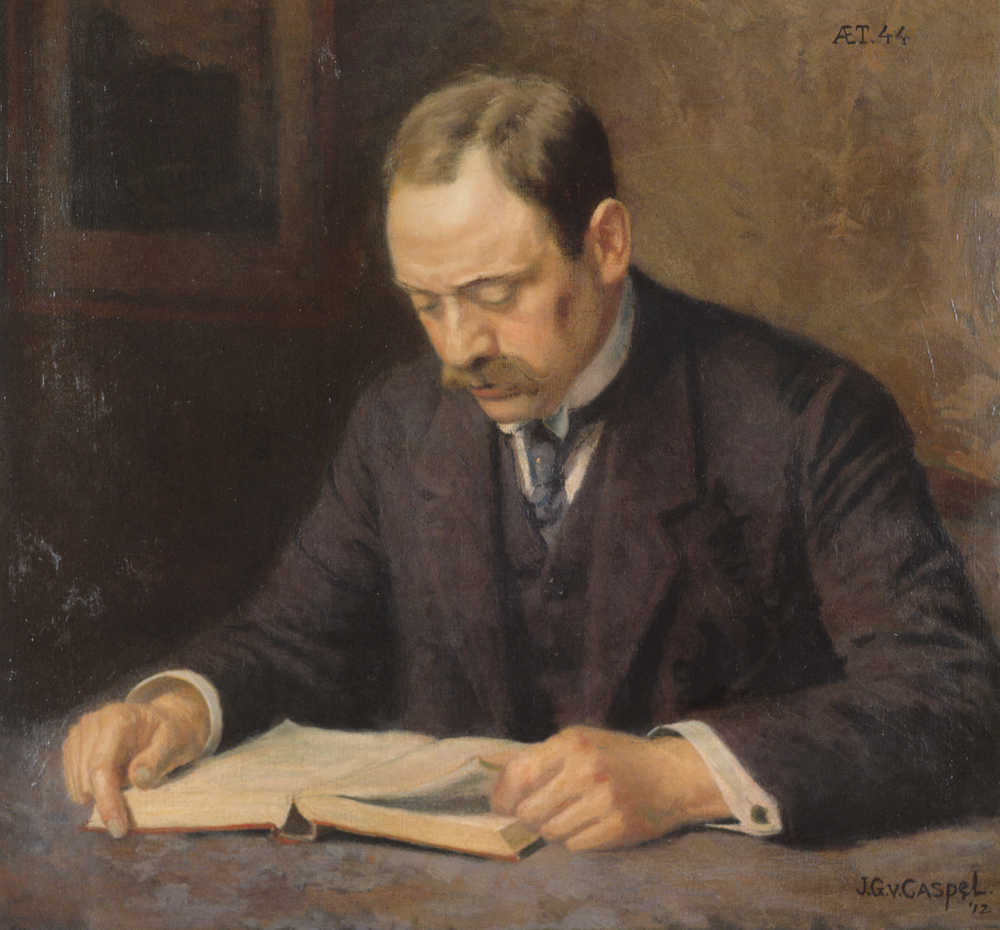
Henri Polak

After the 1929 Great Depression, the influence of the Alliance gradually declined. In 1940, on the eve of the Second World War, the UADW president – the Dutchman Henri Polak, who had held the position since the founding – had to acknowledge that the UADW was at death's door. Switzerland and Great Britain were lost, because the industry in those countries withered and ultimately disappeared. The union in New York was only a member in name; for several years it had shown no sign of life and failed to fulfil any of its obligations. In Germany, the Nazis had destroyed all trade unions in 1933, including that of the diamond workers. The Alliance therefore consisted only of the unions in the Netherlands, Belgium, and France. The economic crisis paralysed its activities. No congresses were held any longer. Influencing wages, working conditions, apprenticeship systems, and the like was impossible. Widespread unemployment stood in the way of everything.

== Post-war years ==
After the war the Alliance was rebuilt. The UADW was reestablished in 1946 through the initiative of the Dutch ANDB and the Belgian ADB leaders. After first rebuilding their national organizations, they moved quickly to revive their international federation, convening a "Liberation Congress" in Antwerp the same year. The UADW's objectives largely continued unchanged from the prewar period, while efforts were made to incorporate new diamond workers’ unions that had emerged in centers such as South Africa and Palestine during the 1930s and the Second World War. But the membership gradually declined; by 1982, the federation had affiliates in Belgium, France, Israel, the Netherlands and the United Kingdom, but they represented a total of only 10,100 members, making it by far the smallest global union federation.

The federation remained at around 10,000 workers until 1993, when member unions in the Belgium, Israel and the Netherlands decided to relaunch it, with a focus on attracting unions outside Europe. It began campaigning against poor labour practices in diamond mining, including a call for children under 14 being banned from working in the industry, and a ban on dangerous cobalt "scaifes" (polishing wheels). This was successful, and by 2006 had members in Africa, Asia and Latin America.

On 1 November 2000, the federation merged into the much larger International Federation of Chemical, Energy, Mine and General Workers' Unions. At the time of the merger, the UADW had roughly 100,000 members, and one of its final actions was to charge the diamond industry with funding wars in Angola, the Democratic Republic of the Congo, Liberia, and Sierra Leone.

== Affiliates ==
In 1913, the following unions were affiliated to the federation:

| Union | Country | Affiliated membership |
|---|---|---|
| General Diamond Workers' Union of the Netherlands | Netherlands | 9,850 |
| Betsalel (orthodox jewish) | Netherlands | 225 |
| Patrimonium (protestant) | Netherlands | 78 |
| General Diamond Workers' Association of Belgium | Belgium | 3,965 |
| Chambre Syndicale des Ouvriers Diamantaires de Saint-Claude | France | 840 |
| Other Chambres Syndicales: Paris (150), Felletin (18), Nemours (22) | France | 190 |
| Chambres Syndicales in Pays de Gex: St Genis and Thoiry (115), Divonne (30) | France | 145 |
| Chambre Syndicale in Geneva | Switzerland | 65 |
| German Metal Workers' Union (Hanau and Idar-Oberstein) | Germany | 440 |
| Diamond Workers' Protective Union of America | United States | 321 |
| London Diamond Workers' Trade Union | United Kingdom | unknown |

In 1960, the following unions were affiliated to the federation:

| Union | Country | Affiliated membership |
|---|---|---|
| General Diamond Workers' Association of Belgium | Belgium | 7,000 |
| General Dutch Industrial Union for the Metal and Electrical Industries | Netherlands | 800 |
| National Federation of French Diamond Workers' Unions | France | 400 |
| National Union of Diamond Workers | Israel | 2,000 |
| Society of Goldsmiths, Jewellers and Kindred Trades | United Kingdom | 260 |

== Leadership ==
=== General Secretaries ===
1905: Jef Groesser
1910: J. Jans
1912: Louis van Berckelaer
1936: Alf Daems
1946: Franz Schoeters
1970s: Albert Buelens
1980s: Constant Denisse
1990s: Jef Hoymans

=== Presidents ===
1905: Henri Polak
1946: Pieter Van Muijden
1950: Ies Mug
1958: H. Van Eerde

== Sources ==
- Docherty, James C.; van der Velden, Sjaak (2012). Historical Dictionary of Organized Labor (3rd ed.). Lanham, Md.: Scarecrow Press. ISBN 978-0-8108-6196-1.
- Farrell-Robert, Janine (2007). Glitter & Greed: The Secret World of the Diamond Cartel (Revised ed.). New York, NY: Disinformation (published 2003). ISBN 1-932857-60-5.
- Goldberg, Arthur (1960). Directory of International Trade Union Organizations: International Trade Secretariats (ITS) (Revised ed.). Washington DC: United States Department of Labour.
- Heertje, Henri (1936). De diamantbewerkers van Amsterdam [The diamond workers of Amsterdam] (in Dutch). Amsterdam: D.B. Centen's Uitgevers-Maatschappij N.V.
- Marsh, Arthur (1984). Trade Union Handbook (3 ed.). Aldershot: Gower. ISBN 0566024268.
