= Jan Sluyters =

Dutch painter

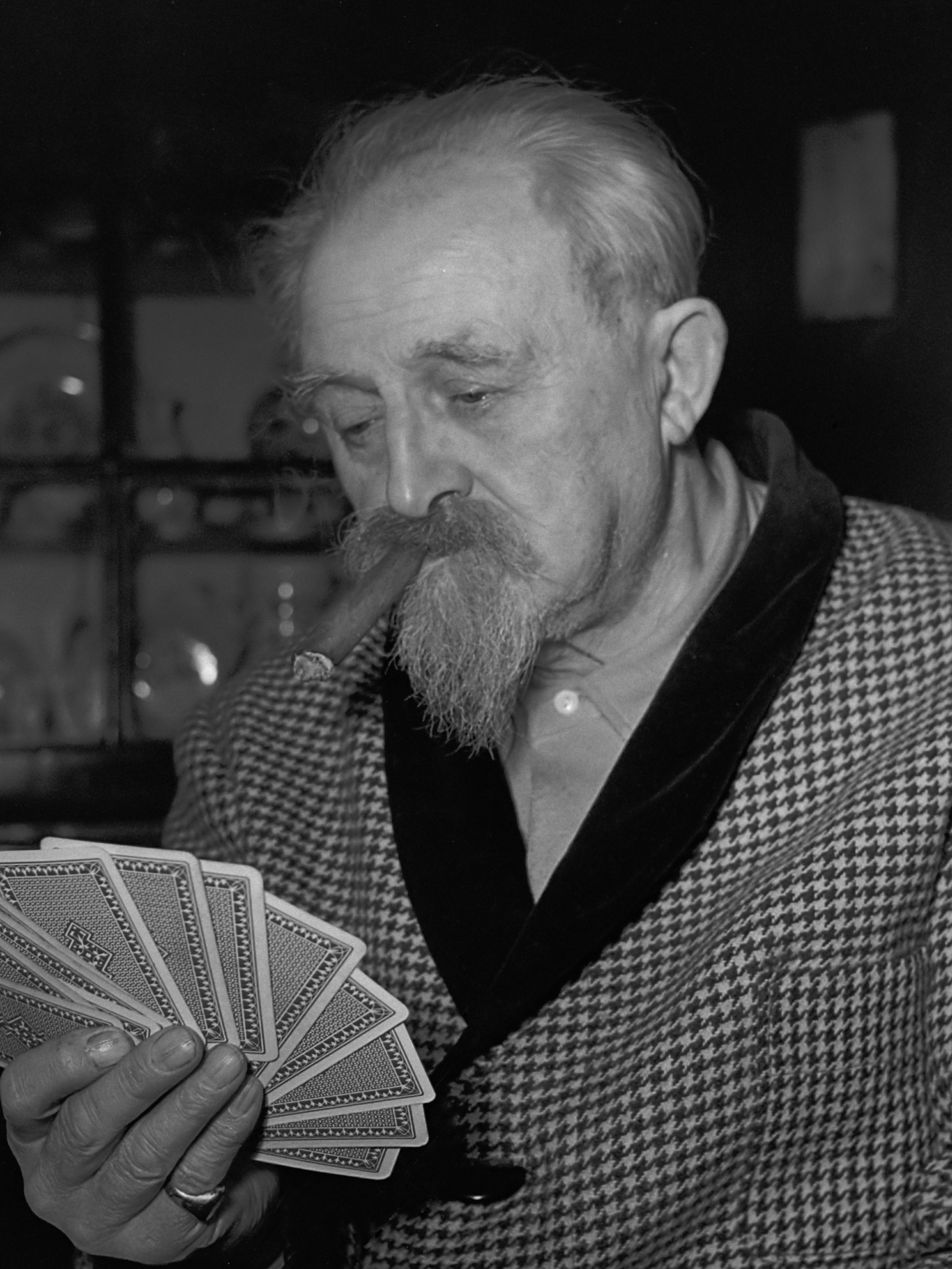
Jan Sluijters (1951)

Johannes Carolus Bernardus (Jan) Sluijters, or Sluyters (17 December 1881 in 's-Hertogenbosch – 8 May 1957 in Amsterdam) was a Dutch painter and co-founder of the Moderne Kunstkring.

Sluijters (in English often spelled "Sluyters") was a leading pioneer of various Post-Impressionist movements in the Netherlands. He experimented with several styles, including Fauvism and Cubism, finally settling on a colorful expressionism. His paintings feature nude studies, portraits, landscapes, and still lifes. His work was part of the painting event in the art competition at the 1928 Summer Olympics. He painted twelve portraits of Tonia Stieltjes in his lifetime.

== Legacy ==
A number of streets are named after him in the Netherlands, including one in the neighborhood of streets named after 19th and 20th century Dutch painters in Overtoomse Veld-Noord, Amsterdam.

== Public collections ==
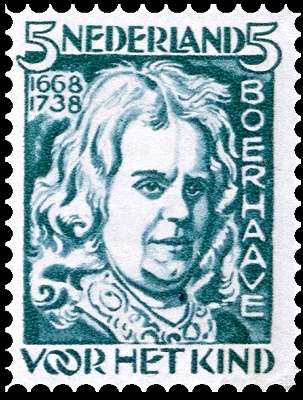
Dutch stamp (1928) w. Herman Boerhaave (design by Sluijters)

Among the public collections holding works by Jan Sluyters are:

- Dordrechts Museum, Dordrecht, The Netherlands
- Drents Museum, Assen, The Netherlands
- Museum Boijmans Van Beuningen, Rotterdam, The Netherlands
- Noordbrabants Museum, Den Bosch, The Netherlands
- Nederlands Steendrukmuseum, Valkenswaard, The Netherlands
- Rijksmuseum Amsterdam, The Netherlands
- Singer Museum, Laren, The Netherlands
- Stedelijk Museum Alkmaar, Alkmaar, The Netherlands
- Van Abbemuseum, Eindhoven, The Netherlands
- Van Gogh Museum, Amsterdam, the Netherlands
- Museum de Fundatie, Zwolle, The Netherlands
