= Liede Tilanus =

Dutch politician

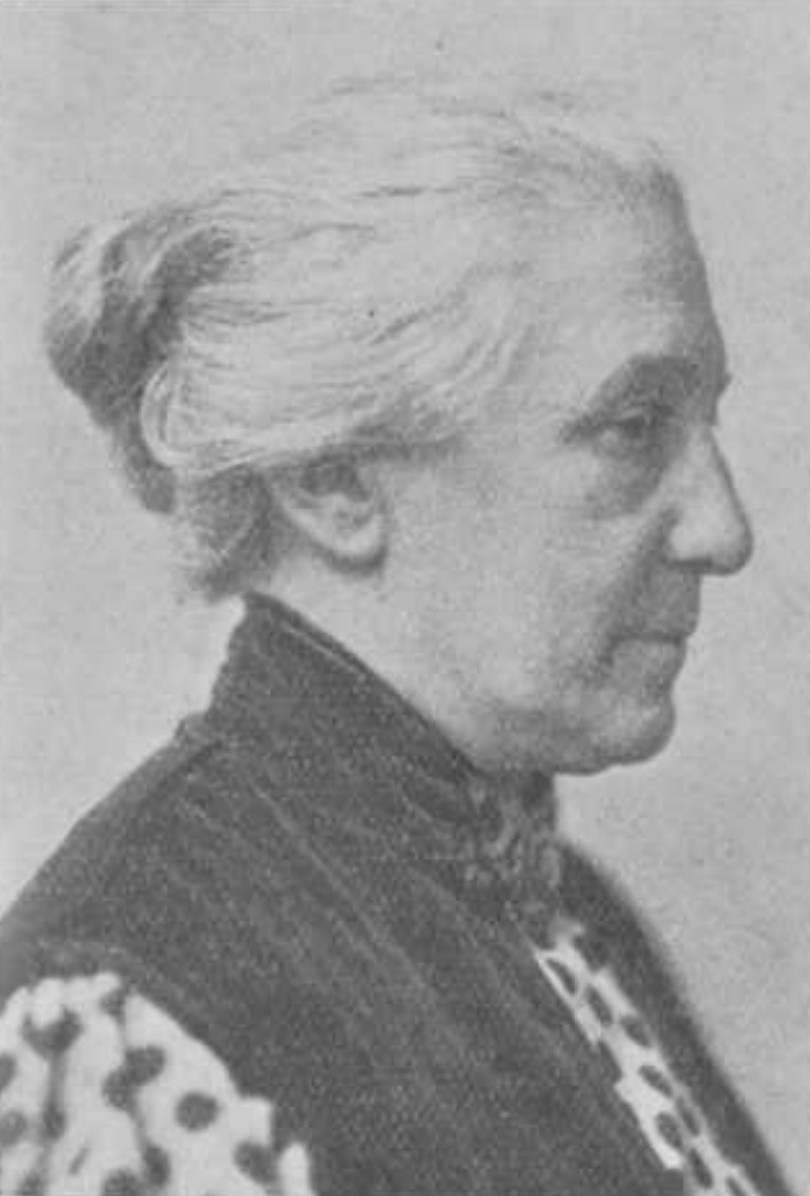
Liede Tilanus

Liede Tilanus (30 March 1871 – 31 March 1953) was a Dutch politician, socialist, and feminist. She was a member of the Amsterdam City Council and was on the national board of the Association of Social Democratic Women's Clubs.

== Biography ==
Tilanus was born in Amsterdam as the youngest of eight children. With her two brothers and five sisters, she grew up on Herengracht in Amsterdam. She was the daughter of Johanna Victoire Liotard (1831–1906) and Jan Willem Reinier Tilanus (1823–1914), professor of surgery at the University of Amsterdam. Tilanus went to a private school and then traveled through Europe. In Sweden she studied homework and crafts (slöjd).

On 9 August 1899 she married artist Michel Duco Crop (1863–1901) in Bloemendaal. They had been married for less than two years when her husband died in a mental institution. On 11 May 1905, she remarried with Jan Eisenloeffel (1876–1957). She continued to use her own name.

Not long after the death of her first husband, Tilanus became a member of the Social Democratic Workers' Party. Together with Mathilde Wibaut, Carry Pothuis-Smit and Henriëtte van der Mey, among others, she founded the Amsterdam Women's Club in 1905, later the Association of Social Democratic Women's Clubs (BSDVC). Tilanus became secretary of the union and pleaded for a women's section in Het Volk in 1913, but that proved in vain. From 1914 she became involved in the women's suffrage movement.

From 1919 to 1935 Tilanus was a member of the Amsterdam City Council. She was on the council committee for public health assistance and worked for more practical homes, Montessori education, the introduction of consultations for infants and female inspectors in the vice police. In her last months as a municipal councilor, she prevented men from officially taking precedence over women in municipal vacancies. Until 1940 she continued to edit - together with Mathilde Wibaut - Ons Kinderblaadje, an appendix to the social-democratic women's magazine De Proletarische Vrouw.

The last years of her life she was bedridden. She died in Zeist on March 31, 1953, after which Het Vrije Volk praised her work for the socialist education of Dutch working class women.
