= Monne de Miranda =

Dutch politician (1875-1942)

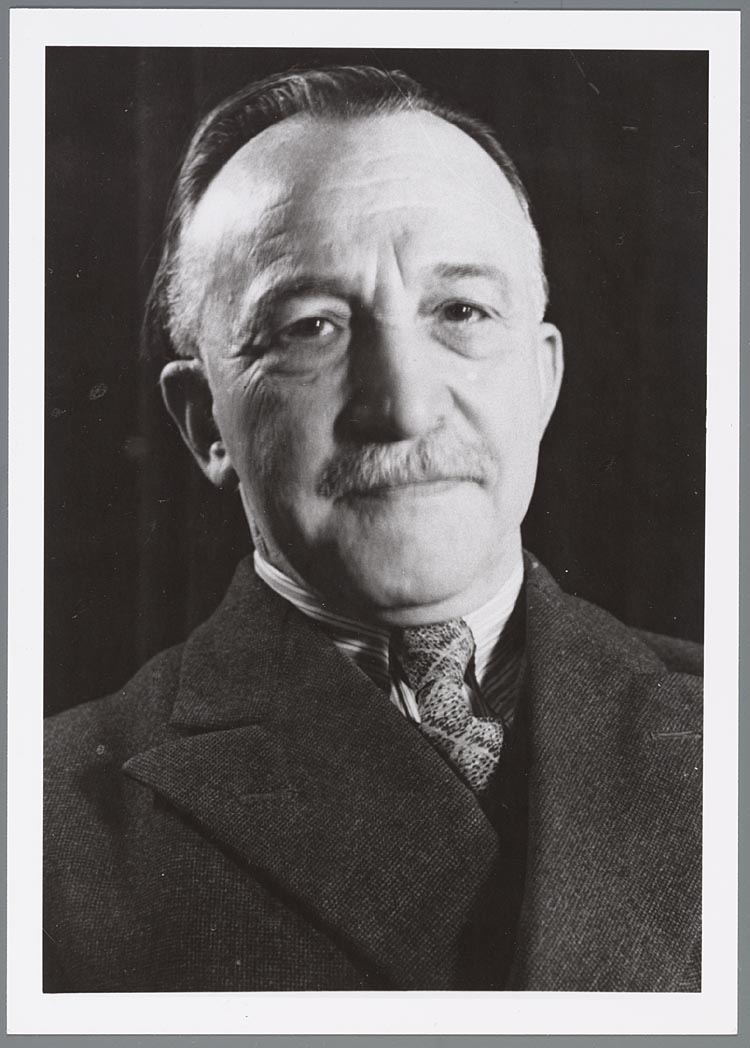
- Monne de Miranda

Alderman
- In office 1919–1927
- In office 1929–1933
- In office 1935–1939

Personal details
- Born: Salomon Rodrigues de Miranda; 21 March 1875 Amsterdam
- Died: 3 November 1942 (aged 67) Kamp Amersfoort
- Party: SDAP
- Spouse(s): Selly Elion (m. 1905; died 1923) Wilhelmina Titia Timmerman (m. 1926)
- Children: 7

Salomon (Monne) Rodrigues de Miranda (21 March 1875 – 3 November 1942) was a Dutch alderman for the Social Democratic Workers' Party (SDAP) in Amsterdam. During the interwar period, he and Floor Wibaut were among Amsterdam’s most influential political figures. A diamond worker by trade, he was one of the leaders of the General Diamond Workers' Union of the Netherlands. During World War II, he was arrested by the German occupiers of the Netherlands, and died as a result of severe abuse at Camp Amersfoort.

== Early life ==
Salomon Rodrigues de Miranda was born on 21 March 1875 into a family of diamond workers. His family was of Sephardic ancestry, but he abandoned the Jewish faith in his youth. At the age of eleven, he left school to start working as an apprentice diamond cutter.

== Political career ==
In 1911, he was elected to the Amsterdam City Council as a member of the SDAP, and from 1919 to 1939 (with two interruptions from 1927 to 1929 and from 1933 to 1935), he was an alderman responsible for public works and housing. During the interwar period, De Miranda was one of Amsterdam’s most prominent local politicians.

He was described as a passionate politician with a large number of well-known projects to his credit. He was involved in food policy, spearheading the initiative for the Central Market Halls, housing construction, and major employment projects (such as the Amsterdamse Bos and the Flevopark). He gained popularity through the construction of several swimming pools: the “Amstelparkbad” was later renamed the De Mirandabad. His ambitious 1926 plan to build a garden city called Gooistad on the Amsterdam outskirts for its workers foundered due to massive resistance from the people of het Gooi.

During the construction of the Amsterdamse Bos, unemployed people were required to participate, under threat of losing their benefits. Due to the poor working conditions and low pay, this “Bosplan” drew fierce criticism from communist circles. Despite his renunciation of Jewish faith in his youth, he was nonetheless attacked for his Sephardic heritage as National Socialism rose to power. On January 6, 1939, an article appeared in the daily newspaper De Telegraaf accusing De Miranda of irregularities in the allocation of municipal building lots. Following an investigation by a city council committee, this accusation proved to be unfounded; he was thus acquitted of corruption and fraud, though he was held accountable for policy errors. De Miranda had become severely depressed as a result of the accusations and therefore did not attend the debates on the matter in the Amsterdam City Council, and was temporarily admitted to a psychiatric institution. The entire affair ultimately led him to decide not to run for city council in the 1939 municipal elections. As a result, he also lost his seat as alderman after the elections.

He wrote another defense, "Pro Domo", which he intended to publish through the Amsterdam publishing house De Arbeiderspers. Agreements regarding this were still being made on July 13, 1940. In early September of that year, De Arbeiderspers decided on its own initiative to cancel the publication due to the German occupation, even though no anti-semitic measures were yet in effect at that time. De Miranda had already paid an advance of 200 guilders and was ordered to pay the remaining costs of 650 guilders as well. In 1997, his defense statement was finally officially published by De Arbeiderspers.

== Murder ==
Due to his ongoing political activities during the occupation and his refusal to comply with a request from the Jewish Council to persuade the participants in the February strike to return to work, he gained the ire of the German occupiers. On July 18, 1942, he was arrested and taken to the detention center on Weteringschans in Amsterdam. On October 23 of that year, De Miranda was transported as part of a large convoy, consisting mainly of other Jews, to the Amersfoort transit camp. On the first day, the Dutch block leader, Teun van Es, a resistance member who had been brought over from Buchenwald by the Germans to improve camp discipline,forced him to undress. Van Es wanted to see with his own eyes whether De Miranda was circumcised. Van Es then marked De Miranda’s body from head to toe with the number 7—including on his forehead—and told him that this was the number of days he had left to live.

The next morning, the communist Willem Eegdeman pulled De Miranda out of the roll call and told the other prisoners that De Miranda had been responsible for the “Bosplan” and would now himself be “put behind the wheelbarrow.” De Miranda was assigned to the Judencommando, one of the hardest labor details, which consisted of Jews and non-Jews who had aided or sheltered them and was responsible for building barracks. On his second day of work, the 67-year-old De Miranda asked for different work, and was beaten in response. At the end of the day, he was thrown into a construction pit and buried under bricks and sand, only to be carried in a wheelbarrow to the “rose garden,” a spot in the camp surrounded by barbed-wire fences. From there, several prisoners carried him, unconscious, to the infirmary, where he was able to recover for a few days until he was put back to work by the camp's doctor, Jan Hendrik Klomp.

De Miranda ultimately died ten days after his arrival at the camp on 3 November as a result of severe abuse by Van Es. In the end, De Miranda could no longer control his bowel movements and was taken to a shower stall where Van Es sprayed him with a powerful jet of water until he showed no further signs of life. After the war, Van Es was sentenced to twelve years in prison for his involvement in this murder and several others.

== Personal life ==
De Miranda married Selly Elion on May 31, 1905. Together they had two sons and three daughters. Selly died on February 14, 1923, and on May 1, 1926, he married Wilhelmina Titia (Mien) Timmerman, a non-Jewish schoolteacher nearly seventeen years his junior. With her, he had a daughter and a son.

== Bibliography ==
- Frijtag Drabbe Künzel, Geraldien von (2003). Kamp Amersfoort (4. dr ed.). Amsterdam: Mets & Schilt. ISBN 978-90-5330-448-8.
