= Floor Wibaut =

Dutch politician (1859–1936)

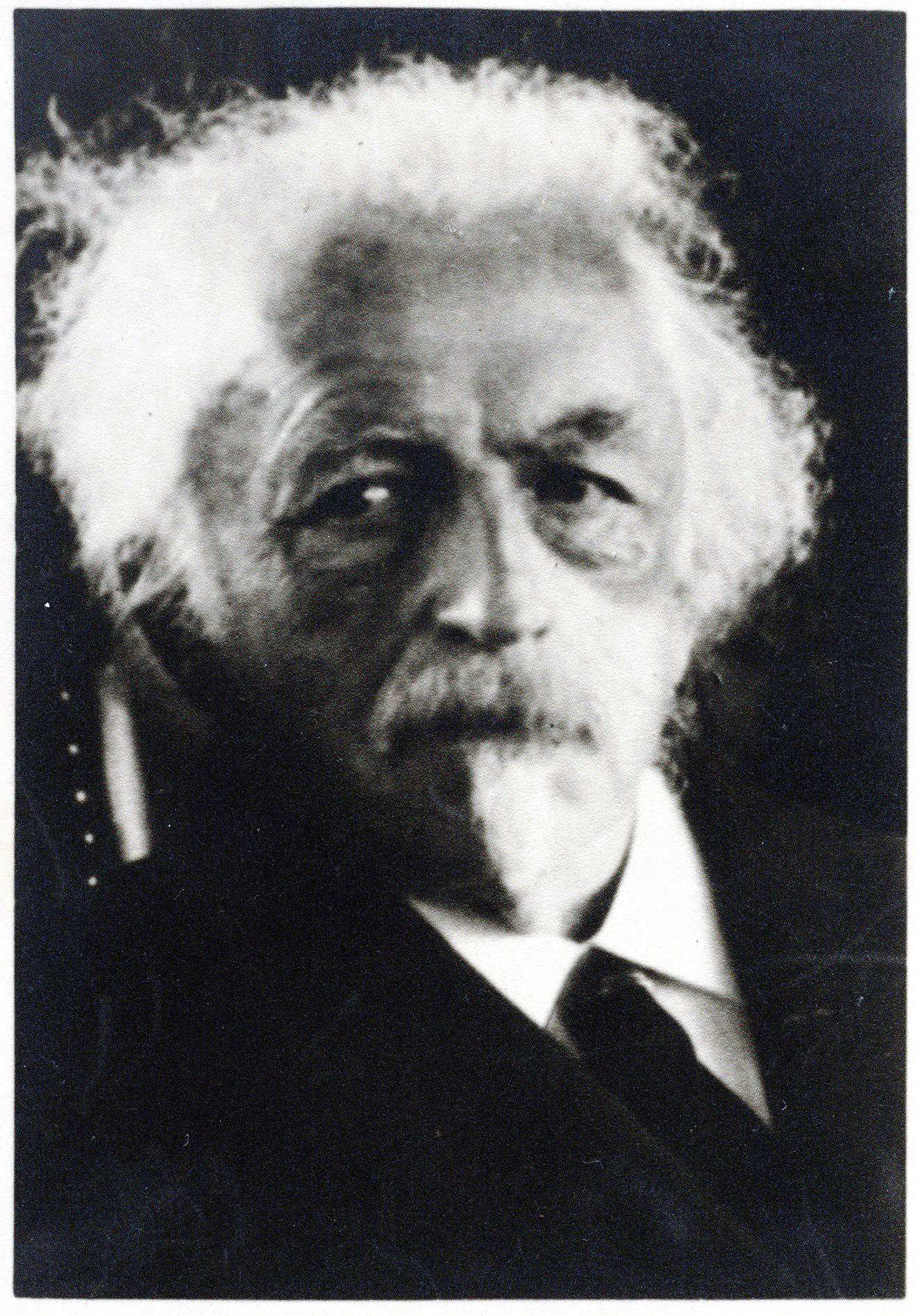
- Floor Wibaut in 1930

Alderman
- In office 25 March 1914 – 21 April 1921
- In office 17 June 1921 – 5 September 1927
- In office 18 September 1929 – 1 september 1931

Member of the Senate
- In office 25 July 1922 – 17 september 1935

Personal details
- Born: Florentinus Marinus Wibaut; 23 June 1859 Vlissingen, Netherlands
- Died: 29 April 1936 (aged 76) Amsterdam, Netherlands
- Party: SDAP (1897–1936)
- Spouse: Mathilde Berdenis van Berlekom (m. 1885)
- Children: 4

Florentinus Marinus (Floor) Wibaut (23 June 1859 – 29 April 1936) was a Dutch businessman and politician for the Social Democratic Workers' Party (SDAP). In 1914, he became Amsterdam's first socialist alderman, nicknamed De Machtige ("The Powerful") due to his influence, and played an important role in building up Amsterdam's social housing system.

He also served as a member of the Senate from 1922 to 1935.

== Early life ==
Floor Wibaut was born on 23 June 1859 in Vlissingen as the tenth child of Florentinus Wibaut, a shopkeeper, fuel trader, and municipal council member in Vlissingen, and Wilhelmina Maria Slaat. Having grown up in a Roman Catholic family, he attended an exclusive boarding school at the Rolduc monastery. Wibaut had originally wanted to become a priest following the death of his older brother, but was convinced to enrol at a secondary school in Amsterdam by his parents instead, and had abandoned the faith entirely by age 16. Influenced by the ideas of Multatuli, he became an adherent of radical liberalism.

After finishing his education, Wibaut found a job at the Alberts timber merchant firm in Middelburg, frequently travelling abroad to countries in the Balkan region, Russia, and the United States. He eventually became a director of the company, amassing a significant fortune in the process. He would continue to work in the lumber trade until 1914.

Throughout the late 1880s and early 1890s, Wibaut abandoned his liberal convictions as he became increasingly influenced by Fabian socialism, translating and publishing a collection of Fabian essays in 1891. He frequently wrote for various progressive newspapers, including Willem Treub's Sociaal Weekblad from 1893, most notably campaigning in support of the families of poor workers in Friesland. Wibaut joined the Social Democratic Workers' Party (SDAP) in 1897, and was involved in the founding of the newspaper Het Volk in 1900.

== Political career ==
In 1904, Wibaut and his family moved to the Weesperzijde in Amsterdam so he could focus more on party work. Within the SDAP, he was considered a member of the Marxist wing, and often portrayed himself as such in internal party debates, but his socialism was influenced more by figures such as William Morris and John Stuart Mill, and he held strong sympathies for reformism as well. He sought to be a conciliatory figure in party conflicts, including during the conflict over the expulsion of the editors of the radical De Tribune newspaper in 1909, where he unsuccessfully tried to mend the conflict but was unable to stop the formation of the Social Democratic Party (later renamed to the Communist Party of the Netherlands). In 1913, he spoke out against the SDAP taking ministerial positions on the national level.

During the 1905 Dutch general election, Wibaut ran in the Leeuwarden district for the SDAP, but was defeated by the liberal Lodewijk Thomson. A second attempt at running for the House of Representatives in 1913 in the Almelo district was also unsuccessful, losing to the Catholic Piet Aalberse.

In 1907, Wibaut was first elected to the Amsterdam municipal council, where he eventually became the SDAP council leader. He was also elected to the North Holland provincial council that same year, serving until 1922.

=== Alderman in Amsterdam (1914–1931) ===
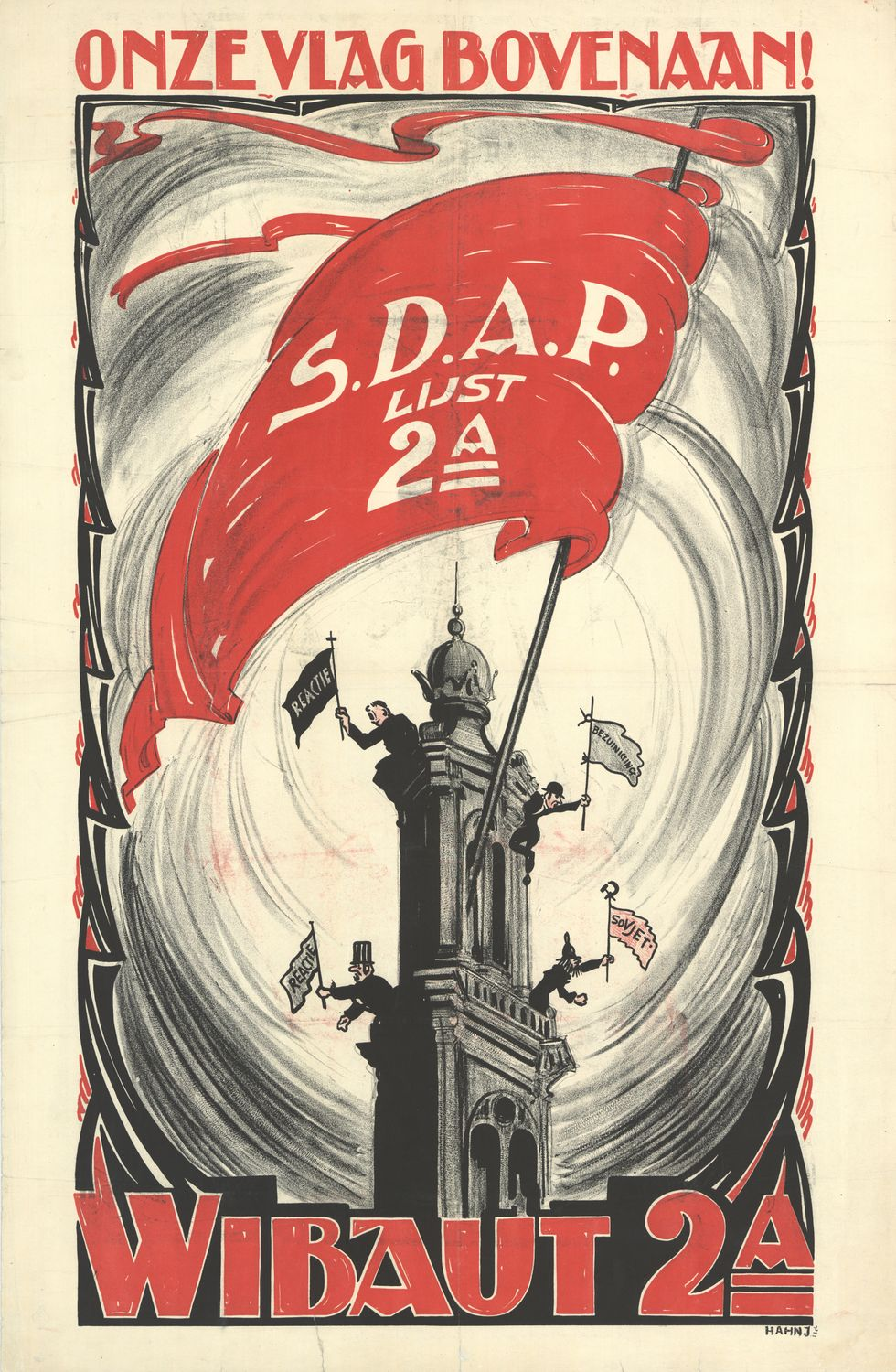
1923 SDAP electoral poster by Albert Hahn in support of Wibaut

In 1914, Wibaut was chosen as the SDAP's first alderman in Amsterdam, responsible for public housing, labour affairs, and after the outbreak of World War I for food distribution as well. His role in ensuring food distribution led to conflicts with fellow party members, and in 1917 he oversaw the Potato Riots in which poor citizens of Amsterdam revolted over a lack of potatoes. He became known for his financial responsibility as alderman, despite initially facing much opposition within the council for his expensive building projects. In April 1921, Wibaut temporarily left office in opposition to the municipality's treatment of striking government workers, but returned to office two months later.

His first building project, the Zaanhof in the Spaarndammerbuurt, was conceived of in 1914 and completed in 1917, but others were put on hold for the duration of World War I. During his period as councilman, he sponsored a bill aimed at building 2,000 homes for workers, and set to work implementing this measure as well as slum clearances after the war had ended. Several new neighbourhoods primarily intended for working-class residents of Amsterdam were constructed under his watch, such as Vogeldorp in Amsterdam-Noord, which were of significantly higher quality than the slums they replaced. Many of these housing projects became examples of the Amsterdam School of architecture. In the 1920s, his public housing responsibilities were handed over to fellow SDAP alderman Monne de Miranda, who eventually oversaw the actual building of many of the building projects, whereas Wibaut became more responsible for financing the projects. He was also responsible for art as alderman, and due to his many connections within the art world contributed to Amsterdam becoming an increasingly influential cultural centre.

In 1927 Wibaut left office for a second time during a period in which the SDAP did not participate in the Amsterdam municipal government, but after an agreement with municipal RKSP leader Carl Romme he returned to office in 1929. He left office in 1931.

=== Other activities ===
In 1922, Wibaut was chosen as a member of the Senate, where he focused on financial and economic issues, defended the autonomy of municipal governments and served as the SDAP's parliamentary leader in the Senate. In 1923, he was proposed as a potential ministerial candidate by national SDAP leader Pieter Jelles Troelstra, but without results.

Wibaut was also highly active in the international urbanist movement, seeing municipal planning and internationalism as a means to ensure peace and build a new world order. In 1913, he was one of the founders of the Union Internationale des Villes (UIV), later known as the International Union of Local Authorities. He became a member of the UIV's secretariat, where he acted as a conciliatory figure and served as its president from 1925 to 1936.

== Later life ==
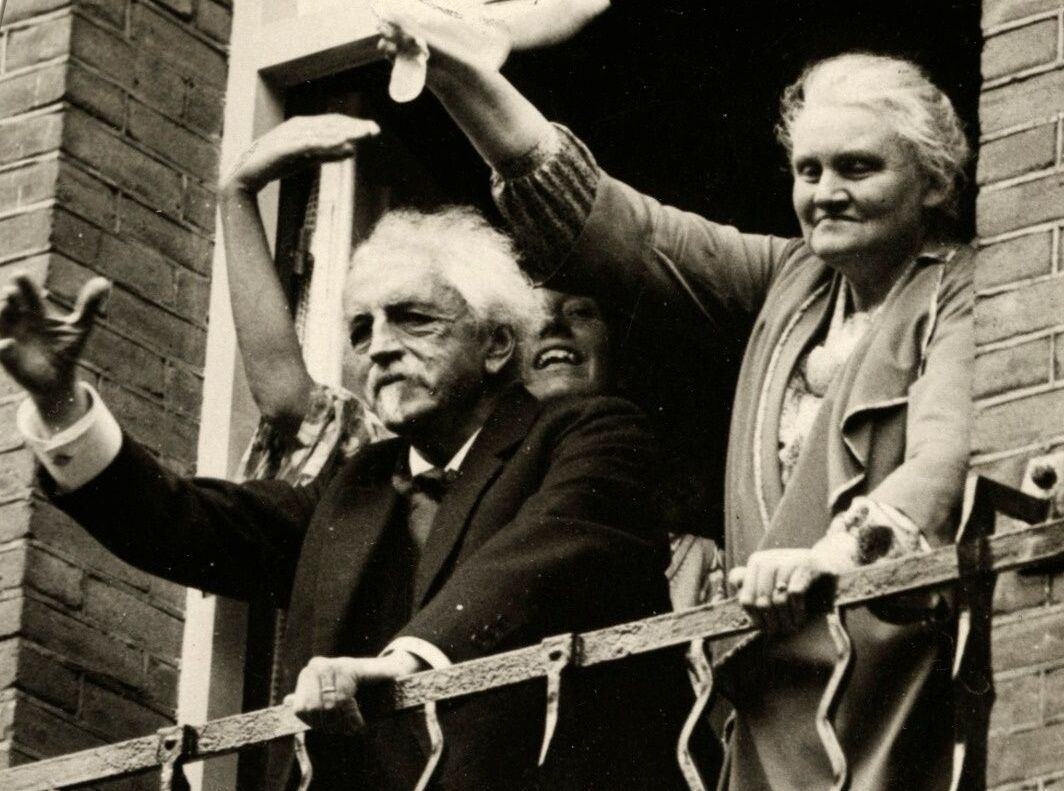
Floor Wibaut and his wife Mathilde Berdenis van Berlekom in 1929

Together with his wife Mathilde, Floor Wibaut published a book in 1932, Wordend Huwelijk, in which the couple proposed far-reaching reforms to marriage. According to them, marriages should be egalitarian, based on love instead of money or other concerns, which they likened to prostitution, and should be preceded by a trial period in which the engaged couple should be allowed to have sexual intercourse. They also supported the use of birth control. In case of marital troubles, the Wibauts advocated bringing a third partner into the relationship, which they thought could prevent divorce and even lead to long-term friendships for everyone involved if jealousy between partners was avoided.

The book was deeply controversial, even within socialist circles. Carry Pothuis-Smit, another prominent SDAP member and the first woman member of the Senate, and her husband wrote a reply in which they condemned focusing on one's sexuality, in favour of establishing a higher socialist morality.

In the 1930s, he grew interested in the development of the Soviet Union, and had written a book in 1931 detailing his travels to the USSR. He also supported closer cooperation between social democrats and communists in order to fight fascism and contribute to the building of a new economic order.

In 1934, Wibaut published Ordening der wereldproduktie, later translated into English as A World Production Order in 1935, in which he proposed a new global economic system to replace capitalism with its recurring crises. This system would be based around a World Economic Council, in which representatives of national economic councils and economic organisations of the League of Nations would sit, which would be responsible for ensuring economic efficiency in economic planning and regulation and founding a global standard for wages and the distribution of goods. He also participated in the writing of the Plan of Labour, the SDAP's proposal to combat the Great Depression, in 1935.

Floor Wibaut died on 29 April 1936 in Amsterdam.

== Legacy ==
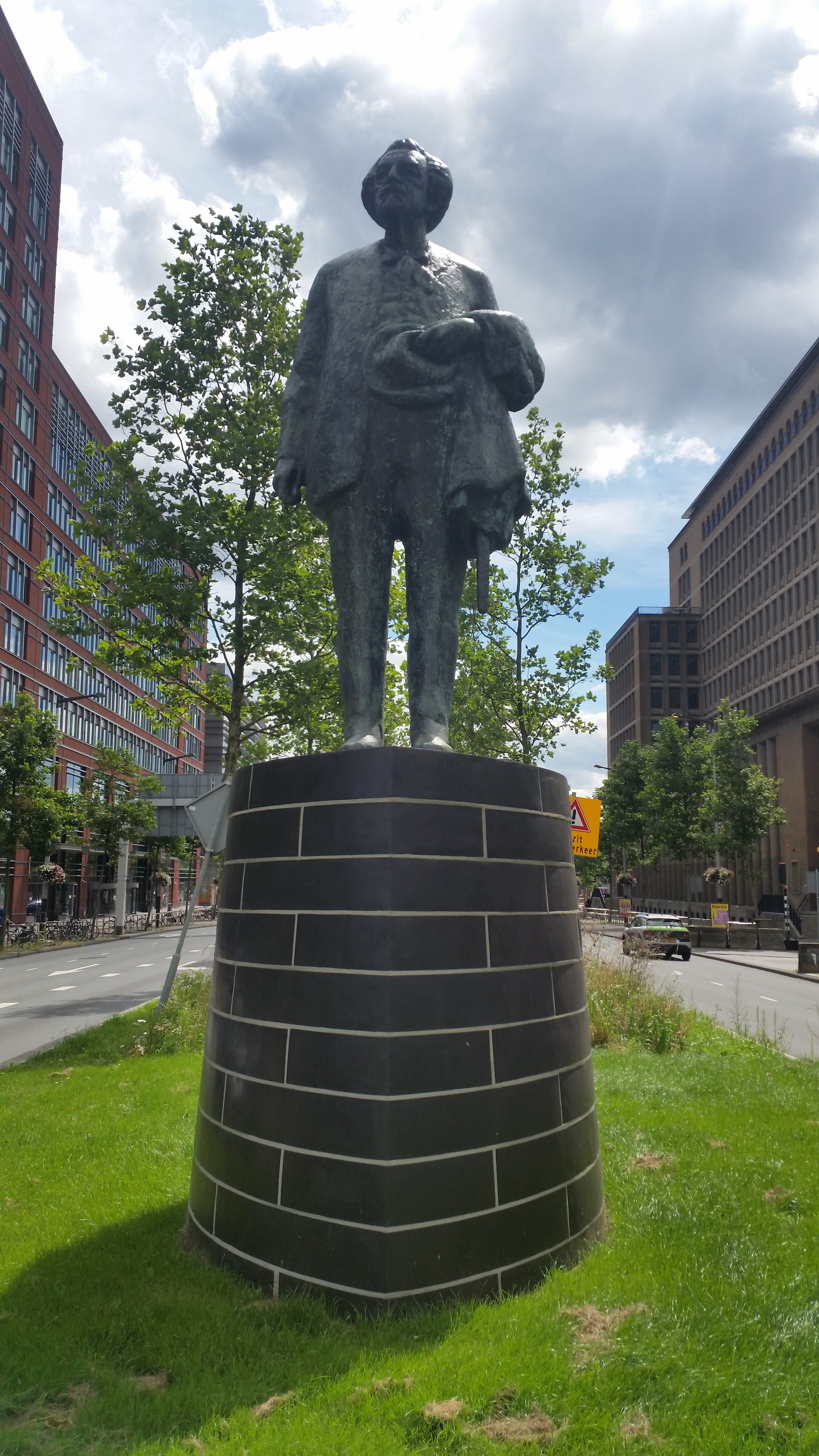
Statue of Floor Wibaut on the Wibautstraat in 2020

In 1959, the city of Amsterdam commissioned a statue of Wibaut from sculptor Han Wezelaar, which was put up on the Wibautstraat in Amsterdam-Oost on 18 March 1967. It was pulled down by rioting squatters in 1982, who saw Wibaut as a symbolic figure misused by the Amsterdam municipal government to distract from its own failures in combating the housing crisis, but was soon rebuilt. In 2007, it was temporarily moved into storage and moved to the Rhijnspoorplein in 2010, but returned to the Wibautstraat in 2019.

== Personal life ==
Floor Wibaut married feminist Mathilde Berdenis van Berlekom in 1885. The two had met in the 1870s, when Floor Wibaut was 19 and Mathilde Berdenis van Berlekom was 16, via a cousin, and grew close as a result of their shared political views and admiration of the writer Multatuli. When Wibaut proposed to her, Mathilde had initially been hesitant, and the two only got engaged in 1884, a period which they saw as a "trial period" for their marriage, marrying officially a year later.

The couple had four children together, the most notable being their youngest son Floor Wibaut Jr., who would become a member of the Senate after World War II for the Labour Party (PvdA). Their first daughter Anna Maria was the mother of VVD politician and International Monetary Fund director Johan Witteveen, their second daughter Josina married Vincent Willem van Gogh, the nephew of the painter Vincent van Gogh, and was the mother of film director Theo van Gogh. Their eldest son Johan Pieter was the father of sculptor Constance Wibaut, and the great-grandfather of Progressive Netherlands MP Suzanne Kröger.

Wibaut also maintained a relationship with writer Johanna Kuiper, who was 37 years younger than him, and eventually also became a close friend of his wife Mathilde despite her initial misgivings.
