= Moderne Kunstkring =

Dutch arts organization

Moderne Kunstkring (Modern Art Circle) was a progressive artists' club and society of Dutch artists founded in 1910 by the painter and critic Conrad Kickert with Jan Sluijters. Each year Moderne Kunstkring curated an exhibition of Dutch and foreign avant-garde art.

It held it first exhibition in 1911 at the Stedelijk Museum Amsterdam, exhibiting twenty eight paintings by Paul Cézanne along with Pablo Picasso and Georges Braque. Piet Mondrian, who also exhibited with Moderne Kunstkring, was so impressed by what he saw (including the first Cubist pictures publicly exhibited in the Netherlands) that he moved to Paris soon afterwards. The society held comparably impressive exhibitions in 1912 and 1913 (the latter including more than a dozen works each by Wassily Kandinsky and Franz Marc), but its activities were ended due to World War I.
