= Willem Nicolaas Frederik Sibmacher Zijnen =

Dutch journalist

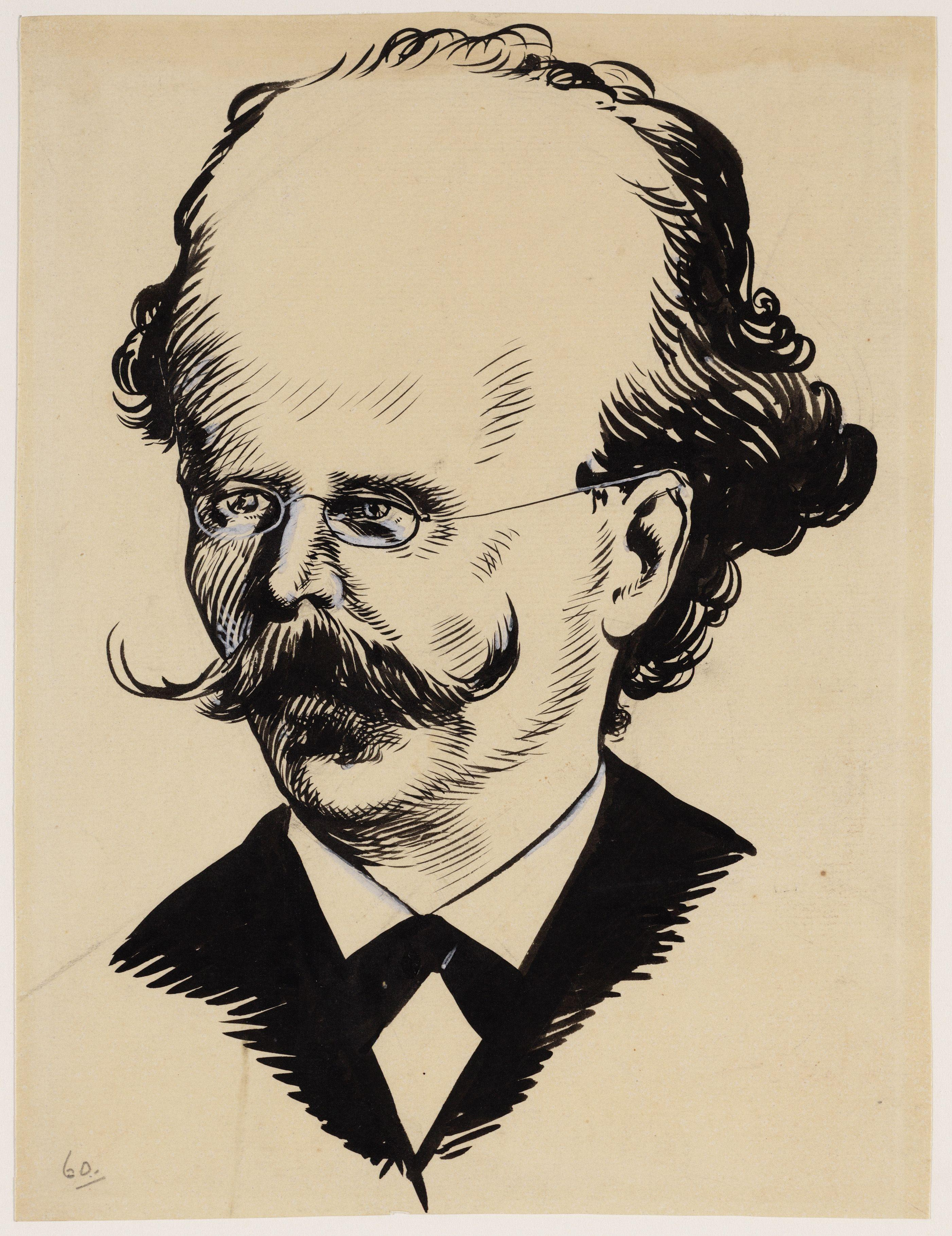

Willem Nicolaas Frederik Sibmacher Zijnen (20 May 1859 - 27 June 1926) was a Dutch journalist and increasingly, towards the end of his career, a music critic.

== Biography ==
Willem Nicolaas Frederik Sibmacher Zijnen was born in Middelburg (Zeeland). His 32-year-old father, Frederik Pieter Jacob Sibmacher Zijnen, was a preacher.

Sibmacher Zijnen studied Literature at the University of Leiden. Between 1882 and 1884 he was a contributing editor, and then editor-in-chief, for the Middelburgsche Courant (regional newspaper). He then transferred to De Amsterdammer.

He married Joanna Alida de Kanter (1861-1941) on 24 July 1890, the daughter of Jacobus de Kanter, a recently deceased Middelburg real-estate agent.

Between 1895 and 1906 he worked on the Nieuwe Rotterdamsche Courant. The focus of his work was increasingly as a music critic. In June 1902 he crossed the border in order to attend the premier of third symphony at Krefeld on behalf of his newspaper. He was the only Dutchman among the ten newspaper critics identified in the audience. Mahler was widely regarded as "too modern" by concert audiences at this time, but Sibmacher Zijnen was an enthusiast. On 9 March 1905 he attended a performance of the fifth symphony conducted by Mengelberg at Arnhem. The playing alone, he wrote, "deserved a much more marked and cordial reaction [from the audience]. Mengelberg's performance had been "a grand exploit that demanded respect". In other contributions to the paper he was at pains to praise the symphonic works of Mahler and bemoan the lukewarm reactions they generated in Dutch concert halls.

He switched to the Algemeen Handelsblad in 1906, contributing as the publication's "music editor" till 1915. He also contributed to various magazines devoted to music, both in the Netherlands and abroad, including the Dutch magazine "Caecilia" and the Leipzig-based "Zeitschift der Internationalen Musikgesellschaft.". It seems to have been illness that drove him to retirement in or before 1916. Willem Nicolaas Frederik Sibmacher Zijnen lived out his final years in Doorn, a short distance outside Utrecht, and it was in Doorn that he died at the end of July 1926.
