= Henri Polak =

Dutch politician

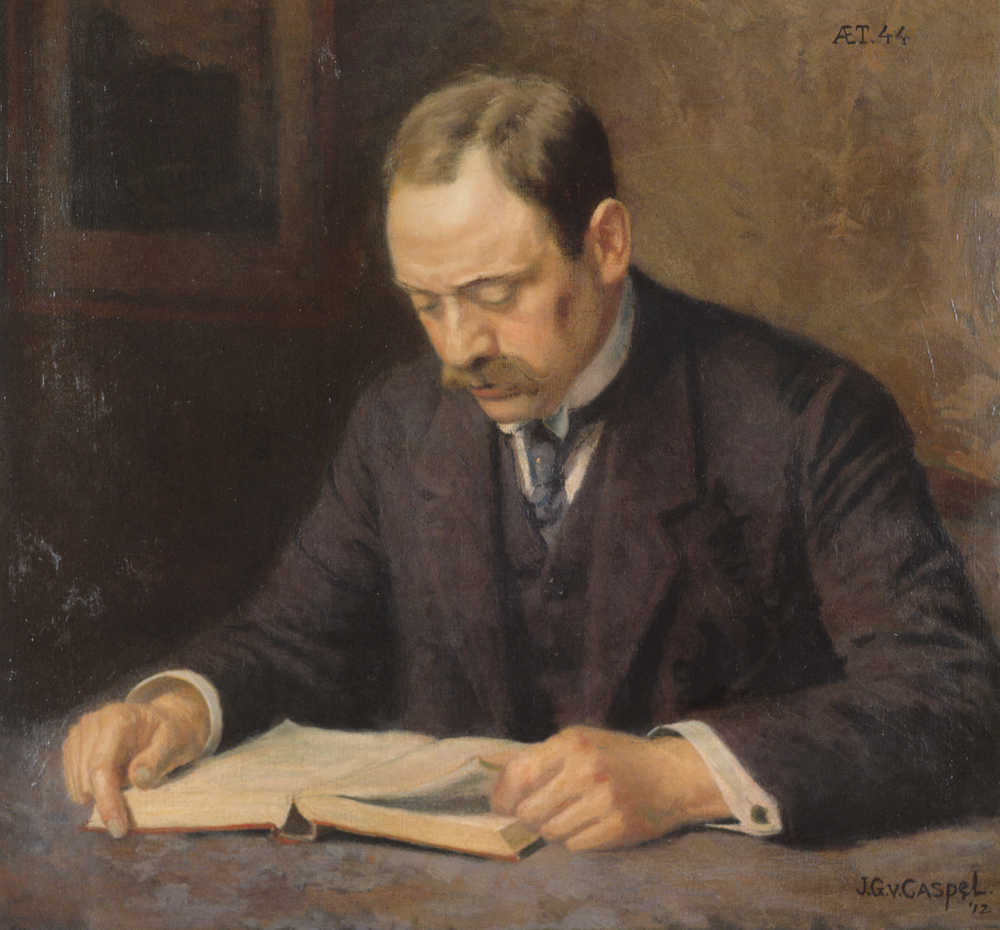
Henri Polak, painted by Johan van Caspel (1912)

Henri Polak (22 February 1868 – 18 February 1943) was a Dutch trade unionist and politician. Polak is best remembered as a longtime president of the General Diamond Workers' Union of the Netherlands (ANDB) and as a founder of the Dutch Social Democratic Workers' Party in 1894. Targeted as a Jew, a marxist, and a trade unionist, Polak was arrested by the Nazis in 1940 but died early in 1943 before he could be deported.

== Biography ==
=== Early years ===
Henri Polak was born 22 February 1868 in the Dutch city of Amsterdam. He was the son of a diamond cutter and jeweler named Mozes Polak and his wife, Marianne Smit. He attended a Jewish primary school until the age of 13, at which time he was pulled out of school to go to work to help support his parents' large family as an apprentice diamond cutter.

In 1886, following an argument with his father over a girl he was seeing, Polak left his native Holland for London where he continued to work as a gem cutter. It was there Polak was exposed to the ideas of Marxism as well as to the history and practice of the British trade union movement. Polak also came to be deeply influenced by the Marxist theoretician Franc van der Goes at this time.

While still in England Polak married Emily ("Milly") Nijkerk (1868–1943) in the summer of 1888.

=== Career ===
Upon his return to the Netherlands in 1890, Polak immediately became involved in the Dutch labor movement. He joined the Social Democratic League (SDB), a pioneer Dutch Marxist political party in that same year. He also became very active in the Netherlands Diamond Workers' Association. In 1893 he joined the editorial staff of De Nieuwe Tijd (The New Age), a Dutch socialist magazine.

Polak gained fame as the founder and first chairman of the General Dutch Diamond Workers' Union (ANDB), established in 1894. The ANDB was the first Dutch union to include a substantial number of Jewish members and Polak was revered for his emphasis on building order, education, and respectability among the fledgling union's members. Polak's commitment to improving the cultural activities of union members, many of whom were formally marginalized and ghettoized in Dutch society, was as important to many union members as his ongoing efforts for the improvement of wages and shortening of the workday.

Historian Jacques Presser later recalled:

"In Jewish families there were of course no saints, but you might say we had a kind of household saint, ...and he was Henri Polak.... Something happened to those people, the wretched of the earth who still sang the International with enthusiasm. I must have heard that from childhood. Those people awoke, those people started to read."

Polak was also instrumental in the establishment of the Dutch Confederation of Trade Unions (NVV), of which he was the first president (1905–1908).

Henri Polak was also active as a nature conservationist. He held a high position in the Dutch Society for Preservation of Nature Monuments in the Netherlands (Vereniging Natuurmonumenten) until he withdrew during the Nazi occupation of the Netherlands. Polak did this because members of the Dutch national-socialist party (NSB) joined the board.

As co-founder of the Social Democratic Workers' Party, Polak also held several functions in this party. He was a councilor in the municipality of Amsterdam and then in Laren, spent several months in the House of Representatives and then many years in the Senate.

From around 1903 he and Pieter Jelles Troelstra edited the Sociale Bibliotheek book series.

In June 1932 Polak was recognized with an honorary doctorate degree from the University of Amsterdam for his services to the Dutch labor movement and for his cultural work on behalf of the country's working class.

=== Final years ===
Following the Nazi invasion of the Netherlands in May 1940, Polak attempted to flee the country to safety in Great Britain. His attempt at departure came too late, and he was arrested about six weeks after the invasion and imprisoned in Amsterdam. With his health failing, he was transferred to another facility at Wassenaar, from which he was unexpectedly released in July 1942, just as deportations of Dutch Jews to Nazi death camps was beginning.

Polak's health failed him and he died in a hospital in Laren of pneumonia on 18 February 1943 at nearly 75 years of age. Shortly after his death his wife Milly was deported to Westerbork concentration camp (Judendurchgangslager Westerbork) where she died in 1943.

== Footnotes ==
House of Representatives of the Netherlands
Preceded by Pieter Jelles Troelstra	Member for Amsterdam III; 1913	Succeeded by Jan Oudegeest
Trade union offices
Preceded by New position	President of the Universal Alliance of Diamond Workers; 1905–1943	Succeeded by Pieter van Muijden
