= General Diamond Workers' Union of the Netherlands =

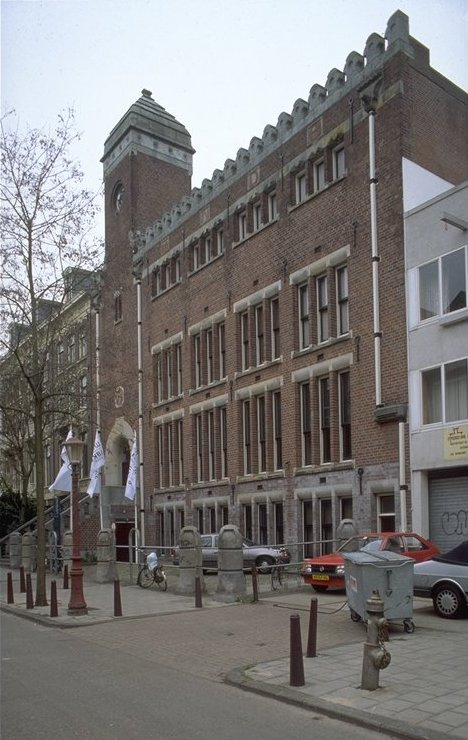
The "Burcht van Berlage", home of the Diamond Worker's Union

The General Diamond Workers' Union of the Netherlands (Dutch: Algemene Nederlandse Diamantbewerkers Bond; abbreviated ANDB) was a trade union for diamond workers in the Netherlands from 1894 to the 1920s.

In 1893, the National Labor Secretariat (NAS) was founded as a national trade union center based on syndicalist principles with a weak and unpaid central board. The General Diamond Workers' Union of the Netherlands, on the other hand, followed the German model, meaning that it had a centralized structure, loyalty and strong discipline among the rank and file, paid union leaders, and high membership dues allowing for a large strike fund.

The ANDB did not join the NAS because of these differences. Its founding was the result of a strike in the diamond industry in 1894. Jews made up a significant portion of diamond workers; some seventy percent of its members lived in or near Jewish quarters. There had been friction between Jewish and non-Jewish diamond workers in the past. Nevertheless, this strike managed to unify workers in this industry and the ANDB encompassed both, though this would sometimes lead to conflict.

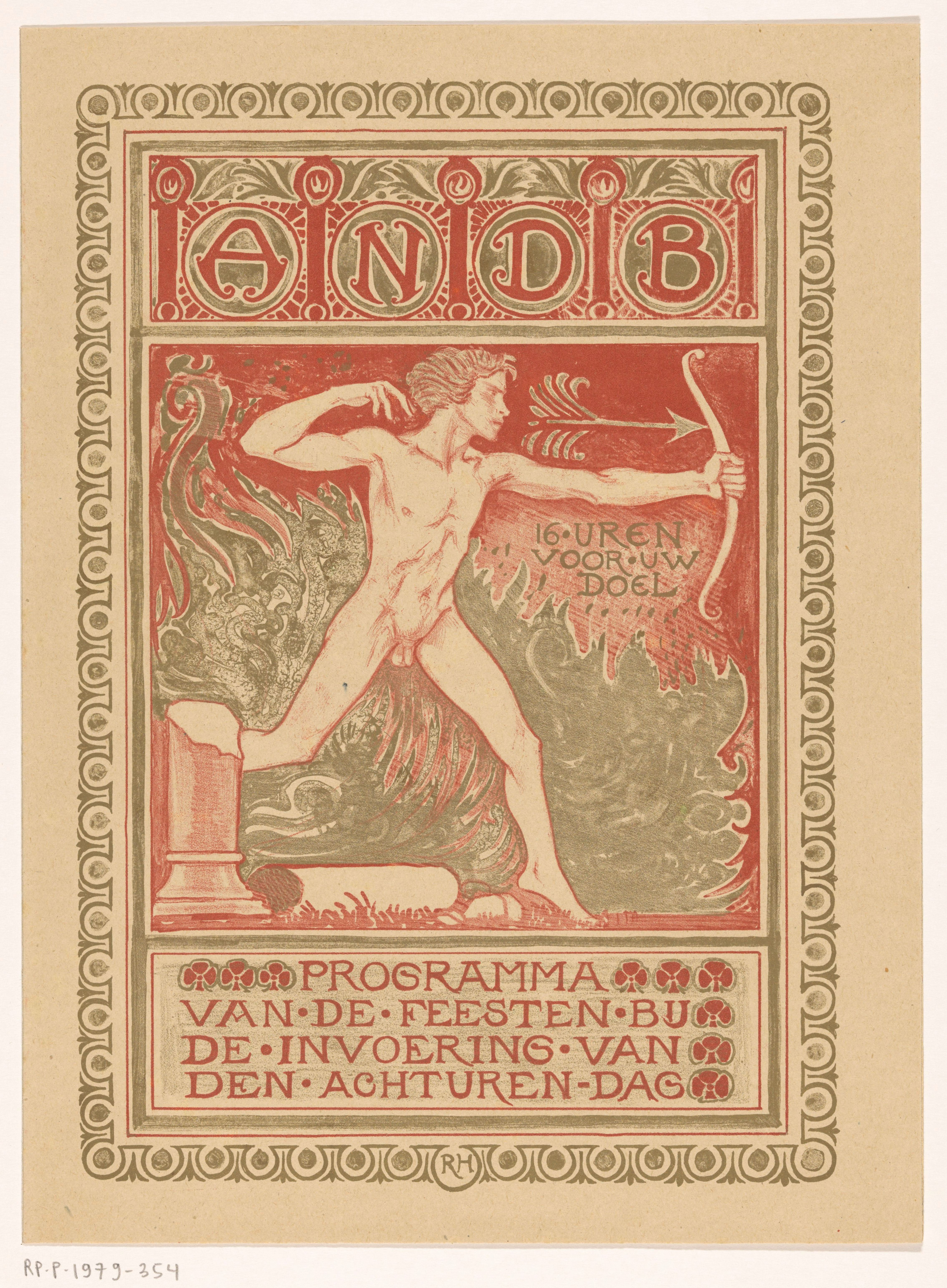
Festivies on the occasion of the 8-hour working day (1911)

Unlike the NAS, which also had political goals, the ANDB focused solely on improving workers' conditions. It struggled for the eight-hour day, achieving a nine-hour work day in 1905. Beyond that, the ANDB was also active in attempting to enrich its members' cultural life. It ran a library and organized cultural events. Instead of joining the NAS, the ANDB was one of the primary founders of the Dutch Confederation of Trade Unions (NVV) in 1906. The ANDB was instrumental in founding the Universal Alliance of Diamond Workers, a global union federation bringing together workers in the diamond industry, in 1905. Prominent leading figures in the ANDB included Henri Polak, Jan van Zutphen, and Monne de Miranda.

Little of the industry survived after World War II, and although the union was reformed after the war, it was on a very small scale. In 1958, it merged into the General Dutch Metalworkers' Union.

== Bibliography ==
- Karin Hofmeester (2004). Jewish Workers and the Labour Movement: A Comparative Study of Amsterdam, London and Paris, 1870-1914. Ashgate Publishing, Ltd. ISBN 978-0-7546-0907-0.
- Selma Leydesdorff (1994). We Lived With Dignity: The Jewish Proletariat of Amsterdam, 1900-1940. Wayne State University Press. pp. 7–. ISBN 978-0-8143-2338-0.
- van Voorden, William (1992). "The Netherlands". In Joan Campbell (ed.). European Labor Unions. Greenwood Publishing Group. pp. 305–322. ISBN 978-0-313-26371-2.
