= Carry Pothuis-Smit =

Dutch politician

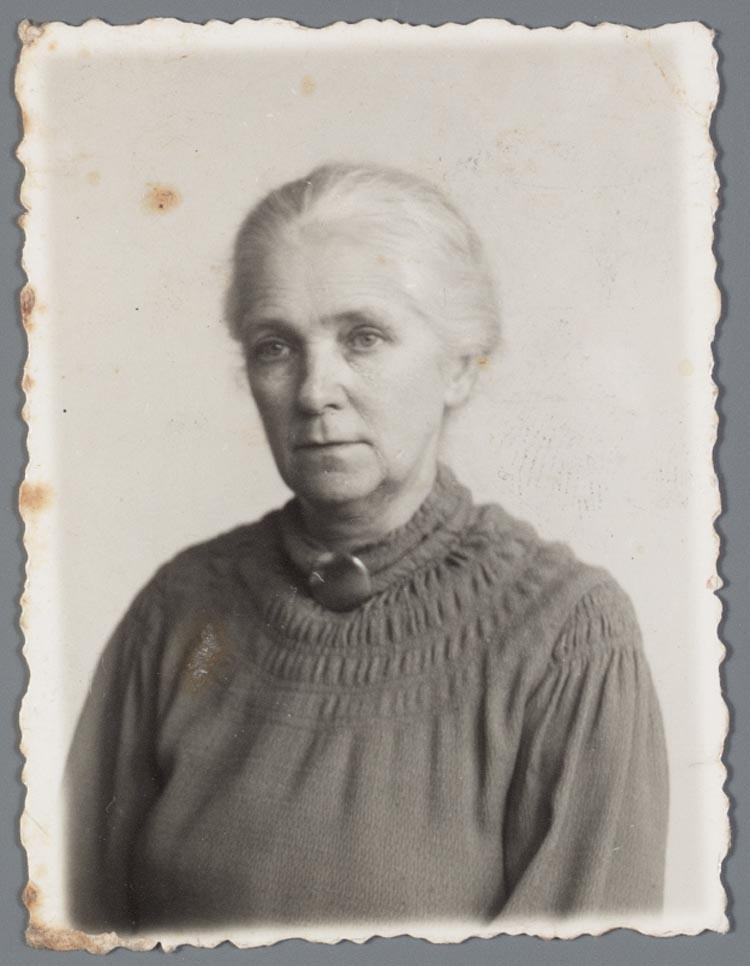

Member of the Senate
- In office 1920–1937

Personal details
- Born: Wilhelmina Carolina Benjamina Smit; 12 February 1872 Amsterdam, Netherlands
- Died: 30 August 1951 (aged 79) Amsterdam, Netherlands
- Spouse: Samuel Pothuis

Wilhelmina Carolina Benjamina "Carry" Pothuis-Smit (12 February 1872 – 30 August 1951) was a politician and feminist in the Netherlands. She was the first woman elected to the Senate of the Netherlands on 23 March 1920.

== Life ==
The daughter of Barend Marinus Smit and Wilhelmina Carolina Benjamina van den Honert, she was born Wilhelmina Carolina Benjamina Smit in Amsterdam. She earned a teaching certificate in Arnhem when she was eighteen and then taught in Haarlem and later in Amsterdam.

In 1898, she joined the Social Democratic Workers' Party. In 1905, Pothuis-Smit founded the Sociaal-Democratische Vrouwenclub ("Social Democratic Women's Club") with Mathilde Berdenis van Berlekom and Henriëtte van der Mey. She was editor of the De Proletarische Vrouw, a socialist women's paper, from 1905 to 1940 and of Socialistische Vrouwenbibliotheek, a series of books for socialist women. She attended the International Socialist Women's Conference in Stuttgart in 1907 and the second International Socialist Women's Conference in Copenhagen in 1910. She continued to be opposed to militarism even after her party changed its position.

She served on Amsterdam city council from 1919 to 1924 and in the Dutch senate from 1920 to 1937. She worked to promote social services while she was a member of city council. In the senate, she supported the right of married women to work and the right of women teachers to be able to marry and keep their jobs; she also campaigned for national disarmament.

Following the German occupation of the Netherlands in May 1940, she decided to shut down De Proletarische Vrouw, mainly for financial reasons. After the war, she worked for a time on the women's magazine Wij Vrouwen ('We Women'). She joined the Dutch Labour Party, even though she continued to hold anti-militarist views.

Pothuis-Smit also published a number of children's books, including:

- Note: translations by Wikipedia
- De verbrande pan, een verhaal uit Bergen (1926) [The burned pan, a story from Bergen]
- De heremiet van Hoekelum (1926) [The hermit of Hoekelum]
- Vertrouw de toekomst (1938) [Trust the future]
- Oorlogsdagboek van een Hollands meisje (1946) [War diary of a Dutch girl]
- Bertie en de ezel (1950) [Bertie and the donkey]

In 1903, she married Samuel "Jozef" Pothuis; the couple had one son and two daughters.

Pothuis-Smit died in Amsterdam at the age of 78.
