= Art competitions at the 1936 Summer Olympics =

Art competitions at the Games of the XI Olympiad
- Art competitions pictogram
- Venue: Ausstellungsgelände am Kaiserdamm
- Dates: 1 – 16 August 1936
- No. of events: 15

Art competitions were held as part of the 1936 Summer Olympics in Berlin, Germany. Medals were awarded in five categories (architecture, literature, music, painting, and sculpture), for works inspired by sport-related themes.

The art exhibition was held in a hall of the Berlin Exhibition from 15 July to 16 August, and displayed 667 works of art from 22 countries. Additionally, the literature competition attracted 40 entries from 12 countries, and the music competition had 33 entries from 9 countries.

The art competitions at the 1936 Games were similar to the 1928 and 1932 Games, with medals being awarded in multiple subcategories for each of the five artistic categories. The judges declined to award any medals for three subcategories, and no gold medals for another three subcategories. Art competitions were part of the Olympic program from 1912 to 1948. At a meeting of the International Olympic Committee in 1949, it was decided to hold art exhibitions instead, as it was judged illogical to permit professionals to compete in the art competitions but only amateurs were permitted to compete in sporting events. Since 1952, a non-competitive art and cultural festival has been associated with each Games.

== Architecture ==
Category	Gold	Silver	Bronze
Architectural design	Hermann Kutschera (AUT); Skiing Stadium	Werner March (GER); Reich Sport Field	Hermann Stiegholzer and Herbert Kastinger (AUT); Sporting Centre in Vienna
Municipal planning	Werner March and Walter March (GER); Reich Sport Field	Charles Downing Lay (USA); Marine Park, Brooklyn	Theo Nußbaum (GER); Municipal Planning and Sporting Centre in Cologne

== Literature ==
Category	Gold	Silver	Bronze
Lyric works	Felix Dhünen (GER) "The Runner"	Bruno Fattori (ITA) "Profili Azzurri"	Hans Stoiber (AUT) "The Discus"
Dramatic works	none awarded	none awarded	none awarded
Epic works	Urho Karhumäki (FIN) "Avoveteen"	Wilhelm Ehmer (GER) "For the Top of the World"	Jan Parandowski (POL) "Olympic Discus"

== Music ==
Category	Gold	Silver	Bronze
Solo and chorus	Paul Höffer (GER) "Olympic Vow"	Kurt Thomas (GER) "Olympic Cantata, 1936"	Harald Genzmer (GER) "The Runner"
Instrumental	none awarded	none awarded	none awarded
Orchestra	Werner Egk (GER) "Olympic Festive Music"	Lino Liviabella (ITA) "The Victor"	Jaroslav Křička (TCH) "Mountain Suite"

== Painting ==
Category	Gold	Silver	Bronze
Paintings	none awarded	Rudolf Eisenmenger (AUT) "Runners at the Finishing Line"	Ryuji Fujita (JPN) "Ice Hockey"
Drawings and water colours	none awarded	Romano Dazzi (ITA) "Four Sketches for Frescoes"	Sujaku Suzuki (JPN) "Classical Horse Racing in Japan"
Graphic arts	none awarded	none awarded	none awarded
Applied arts	Alex Diggelmann (SUI) "Arosa I Placard"	Alfred Hierl (GER) "International Automobile Race on the Avus"	Stanisław Ostoja-Chrostowski (POL) "Yachting Club Certificate"

== Sculpture ==
Category	Gold	Silver	Bronze
Statues	Farpi Vignoli (ITA) "Sulky Driver"	Arno Breker (GER) "Decathlon Athlete"	Stig Blomberg (SWE) "Wrestling Youths"
Reliefs	Emil Sutor (GER) "Hurdlers"	Józef Klukowski (POL) "Ball"	none awarded
Medals	none awarded	Luciano Mercante (ITA) "Medals"	Josuë Dupon (BEL) "Equestrian Medals"

== Medal table ==
At the time, medals were awarded to these artists, but art competitions are no longer regarded as official Olympic events by the International Olympic Committee. These events do not appear in the IOC medal database, and these totals are not included in the IOC's medal table for the 1936 Games.

* Host nation (Germany)

Rank	NOC	Gold	Silver	Bronze	Total
1	Germany*	5	5	2	12
2	Italy	1	4	0	5
3	Austria	1	1	2	4
4	Finland	1	0	0	1
4	Switzerland	1	0	0	1
6	Poland	0	1	2	3
7	United States	0	1	0	1
8	Japan	0	0	2	2
9	Belgium	0	0	1	1
9	Czechoslovakia	0	0	1	1
9	Sweden	0	0	1	1
Totals (11 entries)		9	12	11	32

== Dance ==
Hitler wanted to add a further selection of artistic events that he believed would glorify the Nazis to the programme of the 1936 Games, including dance. The International Olympic Committee declined to approve any of the events, though dance had been among the original planned art events when they were first introduced. Still, dance was included as an unofficial art event at the 1936 Games, known as the Internationale Tanzwettspiele. Fourteen nations took part, and a festival with choreography and performance by Harald Kreutzberg and Mary Wigman was held. Rudolf von Laban had also been contracted to contribute, but his choreography was not deemed to be suitable propaganda and he was placed under house arrest. Kreutzberg and Wigman then also took part in the competitive part of the dance event, being among the (honorary) medalists.

== Events summary ==
=== Architecture ===
Designs for Town Planning

The following architects took part:

Rank	Name	Country
1	Werner March, Walter March	Germany
2	Charles Downing Lay	United States
3	Theodor Nußbaum	Germany
AC	Erwin Ilz, Hans Pfann	Austria
AC	Franz Peydl, Josef Schilhab	Austria

Architectural designs

The following architects took part:

Rank	Name	Country
1	Hermann Kutschera	Austria
2	Werner March	Germany
3	Herbert Kastinger, Hermann Stiegholzer	Austria
AC	Costantino Costantini	Italy
AC	Johann Rezac	Austria

Further entries

The following architects took part:

Rank	Name	Country
AC	Nomen Nescio	Bolivia
AC	Hermann Alker	Germany
AC	Roderich Fick	Germany
AC	Eduard Krüger	Germany
AC	Werner March	Germany
AC	Theodor Nußbaum	Germany
AC	Dieter Oesterlen	Germany
AC	Fred Otto	Germany
AC	Erich zu Putlitz	Germany
AC	Herbert Ruhl	Germany
AC	Alfred Schmidt	Germany
AC	Edmund Fabry	Germany
AC	Wilhelm Hirsch	Germany
AC	Franz Schuster	Germany
AC	Konstantinos Doxiadis	Greece
AC	Wolter Bakker	Netherlands
AC	Jo Boer	Netherlands
AC	Foeke Kuipers	Netherlands
AC	Ben Moolhuysen	Netherlands
AC	Sjraar Cuijpers	Netherlands
AC	Daan Roodenburgh	Netherlands
AC	Henri Zwiers	Netherlands
AC	Giulio Arata	Italy
AC	Enrico Bianchini	Italy
AC	Raffaello Fagnoni	Italy
AC	Dagoberto Ortensi	Italy

Rank	Name	Country
AC	Paride Contri	Italy
AC	Costantino Costantini	Italy
AC	Amedeo D'Albora	Italy
AC	Angelo Frisa	Italy
AC	Guglielmo Giuliani	Italy
AC	Luigi Moretti	Italy
AC	Pier Luigi Nervi	Italy
AC	Cesare Valle	Italy
AC	Achille Pintonello	Italy
AC	Junichiro Ishikawa	Japan
AC	Hideto Kishida	Japan
AC	Yoshikazu Uchida	Japan
AC	Kosta Petrović	Yugoslavia
AC	Ferdinand Andri	Austria
AC	Hubert Matuschek	Austria
AC	Paul Meissner	Austria
AC	Leopold Bauer	Austria
AC	Oswald Haerdtl	Austria
AC	Hans Hofmann	Austria
AC	Fritz Trautmann	Austria
AC	Romuald Gutt	Poland
AC	Aleksander Szniolis	Poland
AC	Iuliu Hațieganu	Romania
AC	Hanns Beyeler	Switzerland
AC	Josef Kříž	Czechoslovakia
AC	Jaroslav Nedvěd	Czechoslovakia

Rank	Name	Country
AC	Josef Bauer	Czechoslovakia
AC	Václav Houdek	Czechoslovakia
AC	Hans Ruda	Czechoslovakia
AC	Rudolf Procházka	Czechoslovakia
AC	Karel Martínek	Czechoslovakia
AC	Egon Plefka	Czechoslovakia
AC	Václav Slavík	Czechoslovakia
AC	Bohumil Kněžek	Czechoslovakia
AC	Josef Václavík	Czechoslovakia
AC	Béla Piros	Hungary
AC	Dwight James Baum	United States
AC	Archibald Brown	United States
AC	Roland Coate	United States
AC	F. L. Gregory	United States
AC	Gordon Kaufmann	United States
AC	Frederic King	United States
AC	Frank Molther	United States
AC	Alfred Poor	United States
AC	John Russell Pope	United States
AC	Oskar Reichert	United States
AC	Bruno Biehler	Germany
AC	Hans Schlottmann	Germany
AC	Karl Wach	Germany
AC	Jan Wils	Netherlands
AC	Comune della Città di Torino	Italy

=== Literature ===
Epic works

The following writers took part:

Rank	Name	Country
1	Urho Karhumäki	Finland
2	Wilhelm Ehmer	Germany
3	Jan Parandowski	Poland

Lyric works

The following writers took part:

Rank	Name	Country
1	Felix Dhünen	Germany
2	Bruno Fattori	Italy
3	Hans Helmut Stoiber	Austria

Unknown event

The following writers took part:

Rank	Name	Country
AC	Anne Lindbergh	United States
AC	Klára Marik	Hungary
AC	Lina Galli	Italy
AC	Jerry	Czechoslovakia
AC	Alexander Roda Roda	Austria
AC	Alba de Céspedes	Italy
AC	Alexander Lernet-Holenia	Austria
AC	Avery Brundage	United States
AC	Ernst Udet	Germany
AC	Eugenio Barisoni	Italy
AC	Francis Magoun	United States
AC	Franco Ciampitti	Italy

Rank	Name	Country
AC	Fred Jent	Switzerland
AC	Hans Domizlaff	Germany
AC	Hans Schöchlin	Switzerland
AC	Heinrich Rienössl	Austria
AC	Hans Naderer	Austria
AC	Hermann Stowasser	Austria
AC	Jack Schumacher	Switzerland
AC	László Tharnói-Kostyál	Hungary
AC	Lino Businco	Italy
AC	Louis Grivel	Switzerland
AC	Hubertus von Beyer	Austria
AC	MacKinlay Kantor	United States

Rank	Name	Country
AC	Günter Oskar Dyhrenfurth	Switzerland
AC	Ottó Misángyi	Hungary
AC	Paul Dresse	Belgium
AC	Paul Martin	Switzerland
AC	Richard Augsten	Czechoslovakia
AC	Rudolf von Eichthal	Austria
AC	Takis Sakellariou	Greece
AC	Teofil Marschalkó	Hungary
AC	Theodor Mayer	Austria
AC	Theron Newell	United States
AC	Wilfried Strik-Strikfeldt	Latvia

=== Music ===
Compositions for orchestra

The following composers took part:

Rank	Name	Country
1	Werner Egk	Germany
2	Lino Liviabella	Italy
3	Jaroslav Křička	Czechoslovakia
HM	Jiang Wen-Ye	Japan
HM	Gian Luca Tocchi	Italy
AC	Marius Monnikendam	Netherlands
AC	Alexander Langeweg	Netherlands
AC	Marc-César Scotto	Monaco
AC	Robert Sanders	United States
AC	Roy Harris	United States
AC	Quincy Porter	United States

Compositions for solo or chorus

The following composers took part:

Rank	Name	Country
1	Paul Höffer	Germany
2	Kurt Thomas	Germany
3	Harald Genzmer	Germany

Instrumental and chamber

The following composers took part:

Rank	Name	Country
AC	Gabriele Bianchi	Italy

Unknown event

The following composers took part:

Rank	Name	Country
AC	Chiffre	Yugoslavia
AC	Noboru Ito	Japan
AC	Dante D'Ambrosi	Italy
AC	Demetrij Žebre	Yugoslavia
AC	František Koubek	Czechoslovakia
AC	Hans Luckasch	Austria
AC	Heinrich Schmidt	Austria
AC	Herbert Wieninger	Austria
AC	Jan Pešta	Czechoslovakia
AC	Karl Etti	Austria
AC	Karl Pilß	Austria
AC	Kosaku Yamada	Japan
AC	Ludwig Miller	Austria
AC	Renzo Massarani	Italy
AC	Saburo Moroi	Japan
AC	Shukichi Mitsukuri	Japan
AC	Norbert Sprongl	Austria
AC	Jaroslav Křička	Czechoslovakia

=== Painting ===
Drawings and water colours

The following painters took part:

Rank	Name	Country
1	Not awarded	
2	Romano Dazzi	Italy
3	Sujaku Suzuki	Japan
AC	Jean Jacoby	Luxembourg
AC	Rūdolfs Mazūrs	Latvia
AC	Désiré Piryns	Belgium
AC	Georg Lagerstedt	Sweden
AC	Robert Lips	Switzerland

Graphic arts

The following painters took part:

Rank	Name	Country
AC	Robert Lips	Switzerland
AC	Jean Jacoby	Luxembourg

Paintings

The following painters took part:

Rank	Name	Country
1	Not awarded	
2	Rudolf Eisenmenger	Austria
3	Ryuji Fujita	Japan
AC	Augusts Annuss	Latvia
AC	Eugeniusz Arct	Poland
AC	Georges Frédéric	Belgium
AC	Gijs Kramer	Netherlands
AC	Carl Otto Müller	Germany
AC	Grace Browne	South Africa
AC	Louise Bianchini	Sweden
AC	Engelbert Bertel-Nordström	Sweden
AC	Poul Bille-Holst	Denmark

Rank	Name	Country
AC	Ossian Elgström	Sweden
AC	Auguste Philippe Marocco	Monaco
AC	Bengt Tandberg	Sweden
AC	Carl Gunne	Sweden
AC	Dechko Uzunov	Bulgaria
AC	Folke Persson	Sweden
AC	Frans Langeveld	Netherlands
AC	Georg Lagerstedt	Sweden
AC	Gerhard Gyllenhammar	Sweden
AC	Gunnar Torhamn	Sweden
AC	Gustav Fjæstad	Sweden

Rank	Name	Country
AC	Helge Zandén	Sweden
AC	John Sjösvärd	Sweden
AC	Konstantīns Visotskis	Latvia
AC	Olle Nordberg	Sweden
AC	Stig Munthe-Sandberg	Sweden
AC	Thorvald Hagedorn-Olsen	Denmark
AC	Voldemārs Vimba	Latvia
AC	Lodew Bosscke	Belgium
AC	Anne Pierre de Kat	Belgium
AC	Nikola Mikhaylov	Bulgaria
AC	Leo von König	Germany

Unknown event

The following painters took part:

Rank	Name	Country
AC	Ann Graham	South Africa
AC	Bertha Fanning Taylor	United States
AC	Erika Hartig	South Africa
AC	Maria Łunkiewicz-Rogoyska	Poland
AC	Maria Rużycka	Poland
AC	Monica MacIvor	South Africa
AC	Patricia Saubert-Wetzel	United States
AC	Sybilla Mittell Weber	United States
AC	Wanda Telakowska	Poland
AC	Toru Arai	Japan
AC	Aldo Mario Aroldi	Italy
AC	Armando Barabino	Italy
AC	August Babberger	Germany
AC	Carl Oscar Borg	United States
AC	Ferdinand Andri	Austria
AC	Frank Benson	United States
AC	Gifford Beal	United States
AC	Johannes Boehland	Germany
AC	Karl Borschke	Austria
AC	Ludwig Angerer	Germany
AC	Michael Baxte	United States
AC	Paul Bindel	Germany
AC	Rudolf Böttger	Austria
AC	Štefan Bednář	Czechoslovakia
AC	Włodzimierz Bartoszewicz	Poland
AC	Tsuruzo Ishii	Japan
AC	Takamura Kodama	Japan
AC	Thies Luijt	Netherlands
AC	Adolf Dahle	Germany
AC	Alan Gourley	South Africa
AC	Albert Janesch	Austria
AC	Aleksander Jędrzejewski	Poland
AC	Aleksander Sołtan	Poland
AC	Alexander Posch	Germany
AC	Alfred Gerstenbrand	Austria
AC	Angelo Canevari	Italy
AC	Angelo Jank	Germany
AC	Anton Velim	Austria
AC	Arnold Ronnebeck	United States
AC	Asaji Kobayashi	Japan
AC	Ben Essers	Netherlands
AC	Benton Spruance	United States
AC	Bertold Löffler	Austria
AC	Bogna Krasnodębska-Gardowska	Poland
AC	Bunji Miura	Japan
AC	Cornelis Kloos	Netherlands
AC	Carl Reiser	Germany
AC	Carlo Romagnoli	Italy
AC	Carlo Vitale	Italy
AC	Chosei Kawakami	Japan
AC	Churchill Ettinger	United States
AC	Corrado Mancioli	Italy
AC	Dilvo Lotti	Italy
AC	Egbert Schaap	Netherlands
AC	Ed Gerdes	Netherlands
AC	Edzard Koning	Netherlands
AC	Eizo Kato	Japan
AC	Eiho Sato	Japan
AC	Ekke Ozlberger	Austria
AC	Emil Flecken	Germany
AC	Émile Lucien Salkin	Belgium
AC	Émile-Florent Lecomte	Belgium
AC	Enrico Prampolini	Italy
AC	Erich Torggler	Austria

Rank	Name	Country
AC	Ernst Ludwig Franke	Austria
AC	Erwin Puchinger	Austria
AC	Eugen Niederer	Switzerland
AC	Freek Engel	Netherlands
AC	Felicjan Kowarski	Poland
AC	Ferdinand Kitt	Austria
AC	Fernand Wéry	Belgium
AC	Franz Rieger	Germany
AC	Gerard Westermann	Netherlands
AC	Gee Burcharth	South Africa
AC	Genichiro Inokuma	Japan
AC	Gé Hurkmans	Netherlands
AC	Gerardo Dottori	Italy
AC	Giulio Cisari	Italy
AC	Gordon Stevenson	United States
AC	Grete Kunz	Czechoslovakia
AC	Han Krug	Netherlands
AC	Hannes Neuner	Germany
AC	Hans Spiegel	Germany
AC	Haruo Nagasaka	Japan
AC	Heinrich Krause	Austria
AC	Henry Ziegler	United States
AC	Herbert Dimmel	Austria
AC	Herbert von Reyl	Austria
AC	Hermann Teuber	Germany
AC	Hironobu Kaneko	Japan
AC	Hiroshi Tsuruta	Japan
AC	Hoka Iwabuchi	Japan
AC	Hugo Siegmüller	Czechoslovakia
AC	Inosuke Hazama	Japan
AC	Isamu Toyofuji	Japan
AC	Ivanhoe Gambini	Italy
AC	Jan Kleintjes	Netherlands
AC	Jan Goedhart	Netherlands
AC	Johan Pootjes	Netherlands
AC	Jan Strube	Netherlands
AC	Jang Thill	Luxembourg
AC	Jean-Louis Clerc	Switzerland
AC	Jean-Pierre Romuald	Belgium
AC	Jeremi Kubicki	Poland
AC	Jerzy Jełowicki	Poland
AC	Johann Heinrich Höhl	Germany
AC	Józef Oźmin	Poland
AC	Josef Urbach	Germany
AC	Joseph Webster Golinkin	United States
AC	Józef Klukowski	Poland
AC	Jules Jambers	Belgium
AC	Kanjiro Namie	Japan
AC	Karl-Maria May	Austria
AC	Hajime Ishimaru	Japan
AC	Kazu Wakita	Japan
AC	Ken Tasaka	Japan
AC	Jin Hwan	Japan
AC	Kenneth Miller	United States
AC	Kerr Eby	United States
AC	Key Sato	Japan
AC	Kinosuke Ebihara	Japan
AC	Konrad Srzednicki	Poland
AC	Konstanty Mackiewicz	Poland
AC	Louis Szanto	United States
AC	Mario Gamero	Italy
AC	Masanobu Kobuchi	Japan
AC	Masayoshi Ise	Japan
AC	Max Ludwig	Germany

Rank	Name	Country
AC	Michał Bylina	Poland
AC	Morgan Dennis	United States
AC	Naotake Yamamoto	Japan
AC	Oswald Roux	Austria
AC	Otto Scheffels	Germany
AC	Ottorino Mancioli	Italy
AC	Piet van der Hem	Netherlands
AC	Piet van Egmond	Netherlands
AC	Paul Bürck	Germany
AC	Paul Daxhelet	Belgium
AC	Paweł Dadlez	Poland
AC	Percy Crosby	United States
AC	Piero Fervelli	Italy
AC	Pinetta Colonna-Gamero	Italy
AC	Rafał Malczewski	Poland
AC	Ralph Fabri	United States
AC	Reginald Marsh	United States
AC	Rikizo Takata	Japan
AC	Ritsudo Kobayashi	Japan
AC	Rob Graafland	Netherlands
AC	Robert Lips	Switzerland
AC	Rudolf Otto	Germany
AC	Ryohei Koiso	Japan
AC	Ryusei Furukawa	Japan
AC	Saburo Kurata	Japan
AC	Sakuichi Fukazawa	Japan
AC	Salvatore Pinto	United States
AC	Sanya Nakade	Japan
AC	Seishi Takanezawa	Japan
AC	Senpan Maekawa	Japan
AC	Sergius Pauser	Austria
AC	Shigeki Goto	Japan
AC	Shigeko Ishida	Japan
AC	Shigenobu Ito	Japan
AC	Shiko Munakata	Japan
AC	Shingo Yamada	Japan
AC	Shinkichi Higashiyama	Japan
AC	Shumin Ota	Japan
AC	Shuzo Kanda	Japan
AC	Stefan Mrożewski	Poland
AC	Susumu Yamaguchi	Japan
AC	Suzuko Ito	Japan
AC	Tullio Crali	Italy
AC	Tadao Harumura	Japan
AC	Tadashi Mamiya	Japan
AC	Takahisa Kato	Japan
AC	Takuji Nakamura	Japan
AC	Tensen Ogyu	Japan
AC	Tenyo Ohta	Japan
AC	Tokuo Yamamoto	Japan
AC	Wim Dooijewaard	Netherlands
AC	Wiktor Podoski	Poland
AC	Willem van der Does	Netherlands
AC	Willi Petzold	Germany
AC	Willi Titze	Germany
AC	Will Simmons	United States
AC	Willy Sluiter	Netherlands
AC	Yngve Soderberg	United States
AC	Zygmunt Grabowski	Poland
AC	Gijs Kramer	Netherlands
AC	Jean Jacoby	Luxembourg
AC	Nobushige Kusamitsu	Japan
AC	Byrd Mock	United States

Applied arts

The following painters took part:

Rank	Name	Country
1	Alex Walter Diggelmann	Switzerland
2	Alfred Hierl	Germany
3	Stanisław Ostoja-Chrostowski	Poland
AC	Maria Jacoby	Luxembourg
AC	Lucjan Kintopf	Poland
AC	Ernst Böhm	Germany
AC	Julius Engelhard	Germany
AC	Ludwig Hohlwein	Germany
AC	Dora Corty-Mönkemeyer	Germany
AC	Eduard Sauer	Germany
AC	Hartmuth Pfeil	Germany
AC	Jobst Kuch	Germany
AC	Paul Sinkwitz	Germany
AC	Robert Lips	Switzerland
AC	Alois Houba	Czechoslovakia
AC	William Welsh	United States

=== Sculpture ===
Medals

The following sculptors took part:

Rank	Name	Country
1	Not awarded	
2	Luciano Mercante	Italy
3	Josuë Dupon	Belgium
AC	Günther von Scheven	Germany
AC	Omero Taddeini	Italy
AC	Edward Hald	Sweden
AC	Otto Placzek	Germany
AC	Pietro Borsari	Switzerland
AC	Mario Moschi	Italy
AC	Tait McKenzie	Canada
AC	Simon Gate	Sweden
AC	Victor Demanet	Belgium
AC	Vicke Lindstrand	Sweden
AC	Joseph Witterwulghe	Belgium
AC	Hermann Wandinger	Germany
AC	Harold Winter	Germany
AC	Ludwig Kunstmann	Germany
AC	Publio Morbiducci	Italy

Reliefs

The following sculptors took part:

Rank	Name	Country
1	Emil Sutor	Germany
2	Józef Klukowski	Poland
3	Not awarded	
AC	Otto Rost	Germany
AC	Roberto Terracini	Italy
AC	Robert Frank	Switzerland

Statues

The following sculptors took part:

Rank	Name	Country
1	Farpi Vignoli	Italy
2	Arno Breker	Germany
3	Stig Blomberg	Sweden
AC	Adolf Wamper	Germany
AC	Ansgar Almquist	Sweden
AC	Franciszek Masiak	Poland
AC	Gerhard Marcks	Germany
AC	Hans Stangl	Germany
AC	Yoshioki Hasegawa	Japan
AC	Josef Humplik	Austria

Rank	Name	Country
AC	Fritz Klimsch	Germany
AC	Karl Stemolak	Austria
AC	Knud Gleerup	Denmark
AC	Lajos Petri	Hungary
AC	Mario Moschi	Italy
AC	Otto Hofner	Austria
AC	Richard Martin Werner	Germany
AC	Bazyli Wójtowicz	Poland
AC	Cecil de Blaquiere Howard	United States
AC	Edward Bruce Douglas	United States

Rank	Name	Country
AC	George Kratina	United States
AC	Joseph Brown	United States
AC	Raoul Josset	United States
AC	Sándor Ambrózy	Hungary
AC	Franciszek Masiak	Poland
AC	Elizabeth Benson	South Africa
AC	Krystyna Dąbrowska	Poland
AC	Marian Wnuk	Poland
AC	Olga Niewska	Poland

Unknown event

The following sculptors took part:

Rank	Name	Country
AC	Anne Marie Carl-Nielsen	Denmark
AC	Olda Žák	Czechoslovakia
AC	Robert Frank	Switzerland
AC	Yuhachi Ikeda	Japan
AC	Aage Nielsen-Edwin	Denmark
AC	Alphons Magg	Switzerland
AC	Alfons Riedel	Austria
AC	Alfonso Bortolotti	Italy
AC	Alois Houba	Czechoslovakia
AC	Ladislav Toman	Czechoslovakia
AC	Alphonse Huylebroeck	Belgium
AC	Antonio Biggi	Italy
AC	Aroldo Bellini	Italy
AC	Arvid Källström	Sweden
AC	August Peisker-Disler	Switzerland
AC	Carl Fagerberg	Sweden
AC	Carlo Lubelli	Italy
AC	Eberhard Encke	Germany
AC	Egon Gutmann	Germany
AC	Erich Kuhn	Germany
AC	Ernesto de Fiori	Germany
AC	Ernesto Thayaht	Italy
AC	Ernst Balz	Germany
AC	Erwin Spuler	Germany
AC	Ferdinand Opitz	Austria
AC	Francesco Messina	Italy
AC	Frans Lamberechts	Belgium
AC	František Draškovič	Czechoslovakia
AC	Fritz Röll	Germany
AC	Georg Müller	Germany

Rank	Name	Country
AC	Georges Vandevoorde	Belgium
AC	Giandomenico De Marchis	Italy
AC	Gustave Fischweiler	Belgium
AC	Hendrik van den Eijnde	Netherlands
AC	Hans Ruwoldt	Germany
AC	Heinrich Karl Scholz	Austria
AC	Hermann Geibel	Germany
AC	Hermann Hahn	Germany
AC	Jac Maris	Netherlands
AC	Jean Dušek	Czechoslovakia
AC	Jean Boedts	Belgium
AC	Johann Vierthaler	Germany
AC	Josef Müllner	Austria
AC	Josef Riedl	Austria
AC	Jules Bernaerts	Belgium
AC	Jules Heyndrickx	Belgium
AC	Julien Lefèvre	Luxembourg
AC	Kamezo Shimizu	Japan
AC	Kyushichi Miyajima	Japan
AC	Louis Van Cutsem	Belgium
AC	Luigi Velluti	Italy
AC	Marcel Van de Perre	Belgium
AC	Marian Gobius	Netherlands
AC	Matti Büschmann	Netherlands
AC	Maurice Jansegers	Belgium
AC	Milly Steger	Germany
AC	Orlando Paladino Orlandini	Italy
AC	Oskar Thiede	Austria
AC	Otakar Španiel	Czechoslovakia
AC	Tait McKenzie	Canada

Rank	Name	Country
AC	Rubens Pedrazzi	Italy
AC	Rudolf Schmidt	Austria
AC	Shokichi Hata	Japan
AC	Tjipke Visser	Netherlands
AC	Václav Nejtek	Czechoslovakia
AC	Volterrano Volterrani	Italy
AC	Wenzel Profant	Luxembourg
AC	Werner Primm	Germany
AC	Wilhelm Frass	Austria
AC	Wilhelm Rietschel	Germany
AC	Willy Kreitz	Belgium
AC	Jitsuzo Hinago	Japan
AC	Günther von Scheven	Germany
AC	Emil Sutor	Germany
AC	Otto Rost	Germany
AC	Fritz Klimsch	Germany
AC	Yoshioki Hasegawa	Japan
AC	Josef Humplik	Austria
AC	Karl Stemolak	Austria
AC	Mario Moschi	Italy
AC	Jean Collard	Belgium
AC	Alphonse De Cuyper	Belgium
AC	Godefroid Devreese	Belgium
AC	Léandre Grandmoulin	Belgium
AC	Charles Samuel	Belgium
AC	Paul Wissaert	Belgium
AC	Aldo Buttini	Italy
AC	Silvio Canevari	Italy
AC	Romano Romanelli	Italy
