= Jo Boer =

Jo Boer may refer to:

- Johannes Albertus Boer (1895–1971), Dutch architect
- Jo Boer (writer) (1907–1993), Dutch writer, 1948 winner of the Vijverberg Prize
