= Tadao Harumura =

Japanese painter

- Born: 7 July 1901; Shirako, Japan
- Died: 15 October 1977 (aged 76)
- Occupation: Painter

Tadao Harumura (7 July 1901 – 15 October 1977) was a Japanese painter. His work was part of the painting event in the art competition at the 1936 Summer Olympics.
