= Johann Heinrich Höhl =

German painter

- Born: 19 August 1904; Frankfurt, Germany
- Died: 26 March 1982 (aged 77); Marburg, Germany
- Occupation: Painter

Johann Heinrich Höhl (19 August 1904 – 26 March 1982) was a German painter. His work was part of the painting event in the art competition at the 1936 Summer Olympics.
