= Aleksander Szniolis =

Polish architect

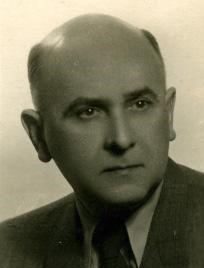
- Born: 13 September 1891; Vilnius, Lithuania
- Died: 6 May 1963 (aged 71); Wrocław, Poland
- Occupation: Architect

Aleksander Szniolis (13 September 1891 – 6 May 1963) was a Polish architect. His work was part of the architecture event in the art competition at the 1936 Summer Olympics.
