= Maurice Jansegers =

Belgian sculptor

- Born: 1903; Ixelles, Belgium
- Died: 1989 (aged 85–86); Longueville, Belgium
- Occupation: Sculptor

Maurice Jansegers (1903 – 1989) was a Belgian sculptor. His work was part of the sculpture event in the art competition at the 1936 Summer Olympics.
