= Joseph Witterwulghe =

Belgian sculptor

- Born: 1 November 1883; Brussels, Belgium
- Died: 1967 (aged 83–84); Uccle, Belgium
- Occupation: Sculptor

Joseph Witterwulghe (1 November 1883 – 1967) was a Belgian sculptor. His work was part of the sculpture event in the art competition at the 1936 Summer Olympics.
