= Egon Gutmann =

German sculptor

- Born: 20 January 1894; Eguisheim, France
- Died: 22 May 1955 (aged 61); Pforzheim, Germany
- Occupation: Sculptor

Egon Gutmann (20 January 1894 – 22 May 1955) was a German sculptor. His work was part of the sculpture event in the art competition at the 1936 Summer Olympics.
