= Josef Václavík =

Czech architect

- Born: 4 May 1900; Tábor, Austria-Hungary
- Died: 20 January 1973 (aged 72)
- Occupation: Architect

Josef Václavík (4 May 1900 – 20 January 1973) was a Czech architect. His work was part of the architecture event in the art competition at the 1936 Summer Olympics.
