= Foeke Kuipers =

Dutch architect

- 1904 self-portrait of Kuipers
- Born: 30 August 1871; Schoterland, Netherlands
- Died: 17 December 1954 (aged 83); Huizen, Netherlands
- Occupation: Architect

Foeke Kuipers (30 August 1871 – 17 December 1954) was a Dutch architect. His work was part of the architecture event in the art competition at the 1936 Summer Olympics.
