= Jules Bernaerts =

Belgian sculptor (1882–1957)

- Born: 1882; Mechelen, Belgium
- Died: 4 December 1957 (aged 74–75); Mechelen, Belgium
- Occupation: Sculptor

Jules Bernaerts (1882 – 4 December 1957) was a Belgian sculptor. His work was part of the sculpture event in the art competition at the 1936 Summer Olympics.

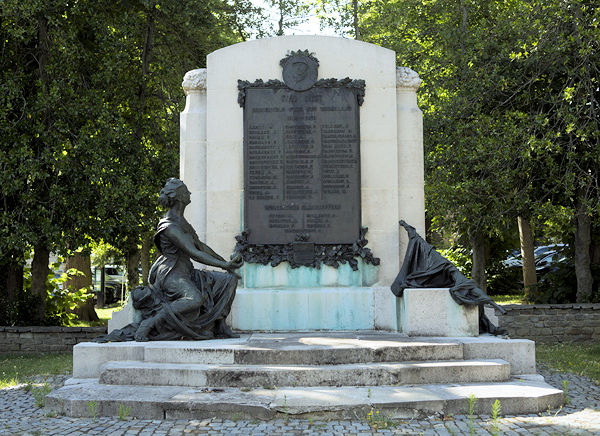
War memorial in Diest
