= Shigenobu Ito =

Japanese painter

- Born: 15 September 1880; Tokyo, Japan
- Died: 31 July 1960 (aged 79); Tokyo, Japan
- Occupation: Painter

Shigenobu Ito (15 September 1880 – 31 July 1960) was a Japanese painter. His work was part of the painting event in the art competition at the 1936 Summer Olympics.
