= Hubert Matuschek =

Austrian architect

- Born: 3 November 1902; Budapest, Austria-Hungary
- Died: 10 July 1968 (aged 65); Vienna, Austria
- Occupation: Architect

Hubert Matuschek (3 November 1902 – 10 July 1968) was an Austrian architect. His work was part of the architecture event in the art competition at the 1936 Summer Olympics.
