= Paweł Dadlez =

Polish painter

- Born: Paweł Marian Dadlez; 1 February 1904
- Died: 18 May 1940 (aged 36); Rava-Ruska, Ukraine
- Occupation: Painter

Paweł Dadlez (1 February 1904 – 18 May 1940) was a Polish painter. His work was part of the painting event in the art competition at the 1936 Summer Olympics. He was killed during World War II.
