= Carlo Lubelli =

Italian sculptor

- Born: 1 January 1902; Lecce, Italy
- Died: 1979 (aged 76–77)
- Occupation: Sculptor

Carlo Lubelli (1 January 1902 – 1979) was an Italian sculptor. His work was part of the sculpture event in the art competition at the 1936 Summer Olympics.
