= Rudolf Otto (painter) =

German painter

- Born: 31 August 1887; Velký Šenov, Austria-Hungary
- Died: 9 September 1962 (aged 75); Dresden, Germany
- Occupation: Painter

Rudolf Otto (31 August 1887 – 9 September 1962) was a German painter. His work was part of the painting event in the art competition at the 1936 Summer Olympics.
