= Georg Müller (sculptor) =

German sculptor

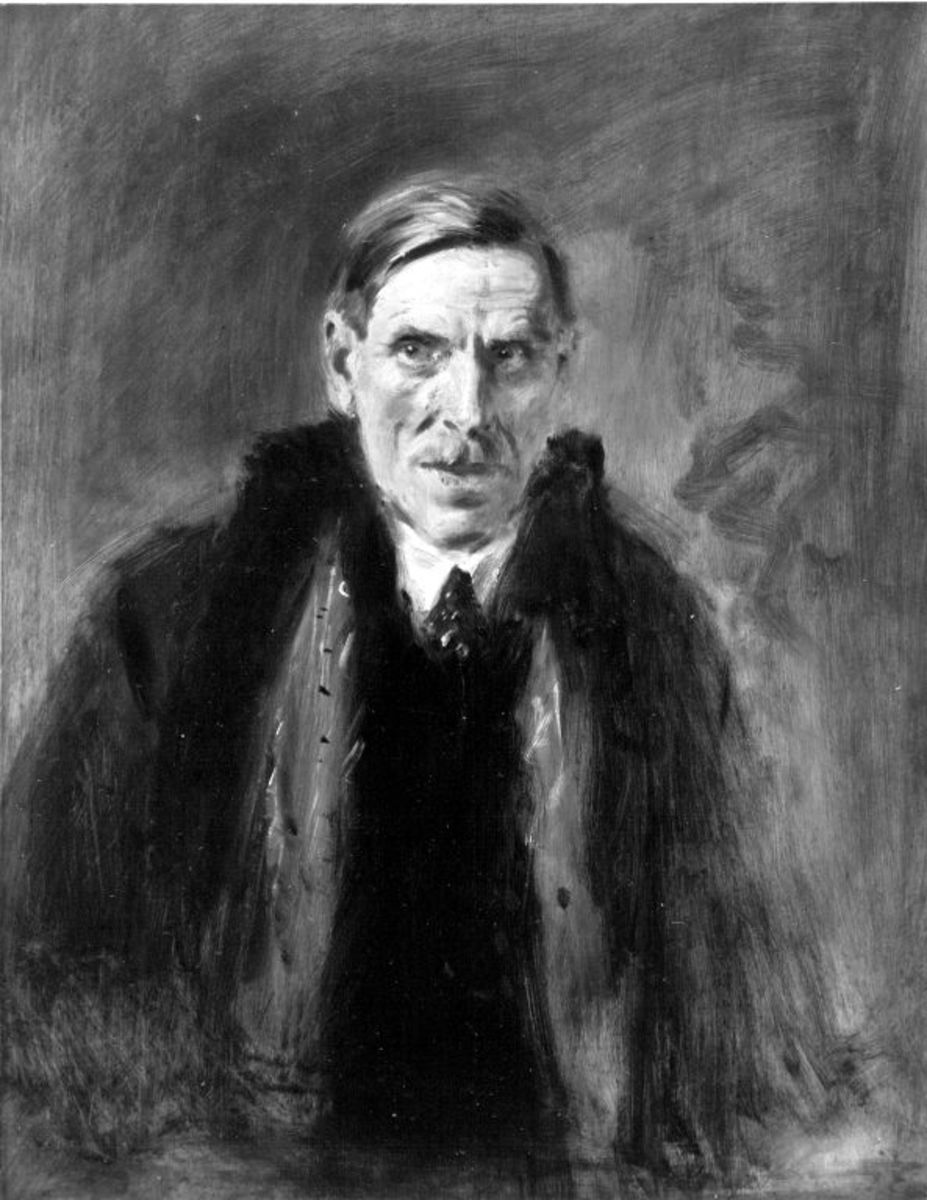
- Born: 23 February 1880; Munich, Germany
- Died: 13 July 1952 (aged 72); Munich, Germany
- Occupation: Sculptor
- Known for: Participant in the sculpture event at the 1936 Summer Olympics

Georg Müller (23 February 1880 – 13 July 1952) was a German sculptor. His work was part of the sculpture event in the art competition at the 1936 Summer Olympics.
