= Marcel Van de Perre =

Belgian sculptor

- Born: 9 June 1908; Ghent, Belgium
- Died: 4 March 1969 (aged 60)
- Occupation: Sculptor

Marcel Van de Perre (9 June 1908 – 4 March 1969) was a Belgian sculptor. His work was part of the sculpture event in the art competition at the 1936 Summer Olympics.
