= Maria Rużycka =

Polish painter

- Born: 25 August 1905; Lviv, Ukraine
- Died: 14 July 1961 (aged 55); Kraków, Poland
- Occupation: Painter

Maria Rużycka (25 August 1905 – 14 July 1961) was a Polish painter. Her work was part of the painting event in the art competition at the 1936 Summer Olympics.
