= Ben Essers =

Dutch painter

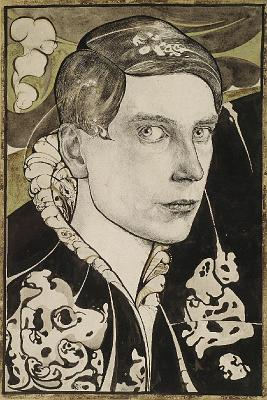
- Bernard Essers 1914
- Born: Bernard Essers; 11 March 1893; Kraksaan, Probolinggo, Dutch East Indies
- Died: 13 May 1945 (aged 52); Scharsterbrug, Netherlands
- Occupation: Painter

Bernard Essers (11 March 1893 – 13 May 1945) was a Dutch painter. His artistic contributions were showcased in the painting event of the art competition during the 1936 Summer Olympics. Furthermore, Essers' work was featured in the exhibition and sale titled Onze Kunst van Heden (Our Art of Today) held at the Rijksmuseum in Amsterdam in 1939.
