= Wilhelm Hirsch =

German architect

- Born: 11 June 1887; Bierstadt, Germany
- Died: 16 November 1957 (aged 70); Bierstadt, Germany
- Occupation: Architect

Wilhelm Hirsch (11 June 1887 – 16 November 1957) was a German architect. His work was part of the architecture event in the art competition at the 1936 Summer Olympics.
