= Monica MacIvor =

South African painter

- Born: October 1881; Bushehr, Iran
- Died: 13 December 1939 (aged 57–58); London, England
- Occupation: Painter

Monica MacIvor (October 1881 – 13 December 1939) was a South African painter. Her work was part of the painting event in the art competition at the 1936 Summer Olympics.

== Biography ==
She was born in Bushire, Iran, of Irish parents, MacIvor studied at Alexandra College, Dublin and at Julian's in Paris, and exhibited from 1908 at the Paris Salons. By 1912, her address was 4 Piazza Studios, St Ives.

She married artist Frank Proschwitzry FREYBURG, and although by 1917 the couple had moved to London, they continued to visit St Ives frequently. She illustrated the Wonder Book for Children.
