= Jack Schumacher =

Swiss writer

- Born: 10 July 1906
- Died: October 1997 (aged 91)
- Occupation: Writer

Jack Schumacher (10 July 1906 – October 1997) was a Swiss writer. His work was part of the literature event in the art competition at the 1936 Summer Olympics.
