= Antonio Biggi =

Italian sculptor

- Born: 19 October 1904; Carrara, Italy
- Died: 1966 (aged 61–62); Rome, Italy
- Occupation: Sculptor

Antonio Biggi (19 October 1904 – 1966) was an Italian sculptor. His work was part of the sculpture event in the art competition at the 1936 Summer Olympics.
