= Harold Winter =

German sculptor

- Born: 9 December 1887; Frankfurt, Germany
- Died: 14 October 1969 (aged 81); Bad Homburg vor der Höhe, Germany
- Occupation: Sculptor

Harold Winter (9 December 1887 – 14 October 1969) was a German sculptor. His work was part of the sculpture event in the art competition at the 1936 Summer Olympics.
