= Herbert Wieninger =

Austrian composer

- Born: 1 October 1910; Vienna, Austria-Hungary
- Died: 6 February 2002 (aged 91); Vienna, Austria
- Occupation: Composer

Herbert Wieninger (1 October 1910 – 6 February 2002) was an Austrian composer. His work was part of the music event in the art competition at the 1936 Summer Olympics.
