= Franz Rieger =

German painter

- Born: August 1895; Munich, Germany
- Died: 1965 (aged 69–70)
- Occupation: Painter

Franz Rieger (August 1895 – 1965) was a German painter. His work was part of the painting event in the art competition at the 1936 Summer Olympics.
