= Erich Torggler =

Austrian painter

- Born: 11 May 1899; Kufstein, Austria-Hungary
- Died: 22 October 1938 (aged 39); Innsbruck, Austria
- Occupation: Painter

Erich Torggler (11 May 1899 – 22 October 1938) was an Austrian painter. His work was part of the painting event in the art competition at the 1936 Summer Olympics.
