= Frank Molther =

American architect (1893–1956)

- Born: October 15, 1893; Syracuse, New York, United States
- Died: October 25, 1956 (aged 63); Panama City, Panama
- Occupation: Architect

Frank Molther (October 15, 1893 – October 25, 1956) was an American architect. His work was part of the architecture event in the art competition at the 1936 Summer Olympics.
