= Dante D'Ambrosi =

Italian composer

- Born: 23 February 1902; Rome, Italy
- Died: 8 June 1965 (aged 63); Pavia, Italy
- Occupation: Composer

Dante D'Ambrosi (23 February 1902 – 22 June 1965) was an Italian composer. His work was part of the music event in the art competition at the 1936 Summer Olympics.
