= Hanns Beyeler =

Swiss architect

- Born: 17 January 1894; Bern, Switzerland
- Died: 11 May 1968 (aged 74); Bern, Switzerland
- Occupation: Architect

Hanns Beyeler (17 January 1894 – 11 May 1968) was a Swiss architect. His work was part of the architecture event in the art competition at the 1936 Summer Olympics. Hans Beyeler played football for FC Bern and BSC Young Boys, with whom he became Swiss champion in 1920. He also played for the Stuttgarter Kickers during his guest semester in Stuttgart. He also played two senior internationals for the Swiss national team (May 9, 1918 against Austria and May 12, 1918 against Hungary). He was also active as an athlete. In 1918, he became Swiss champion over 3000 m at the first Swiss speed skating championships.
