= Lisa Bianchini =

Swedish painter

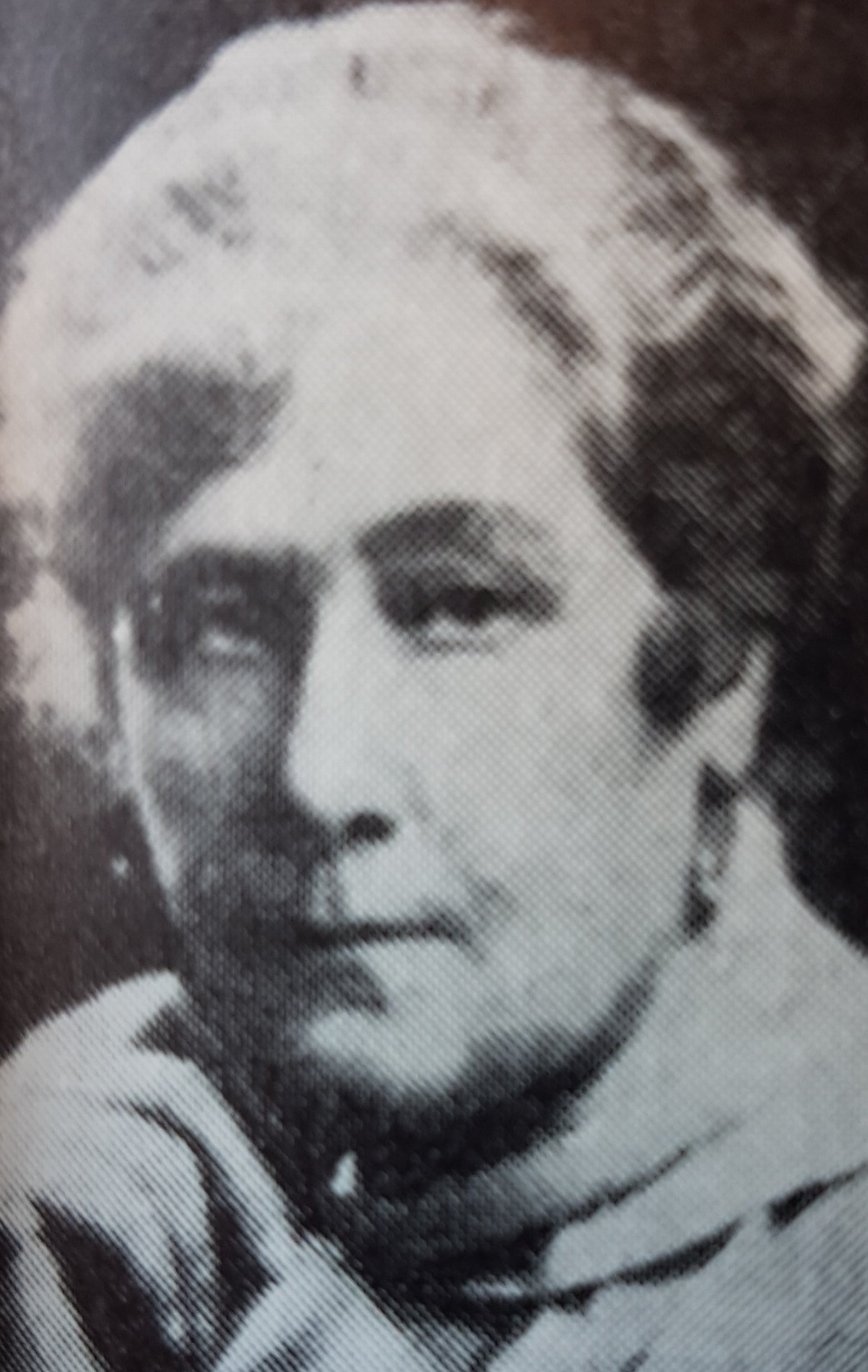
- Born: 11 August 1867; Stockholm, Sweden
- Died: 18 March 1943 (aged 75); Stockholm, Sweden
- Occupation: Painter

Lisa Bianchini (11 August 1867 – 18 March 1943) was a Swedish painter. Her work was part of the painting event in the art competition at the 1936 Summer Olympics.
