= Hubertus von Beyer =

Austrian writer

- Born: 26 March 1912; Vienna, Austria-Hungary
- Died: 23 October 1974 (aged 62); Vienna, Austria
- Occupation: Writer

Hubertus von Beyer (26 March 1912 – 23 October 1974) was an Austrian writer. playwright, film script editor, and co-founder of the German Academy for Poetry and Language Arts in Darmstadt, Germany. His work was part of the literature event in the art competition at the 1936 Summer Olympics.
