= Willi Petzold =

German painter

Willy Petzold
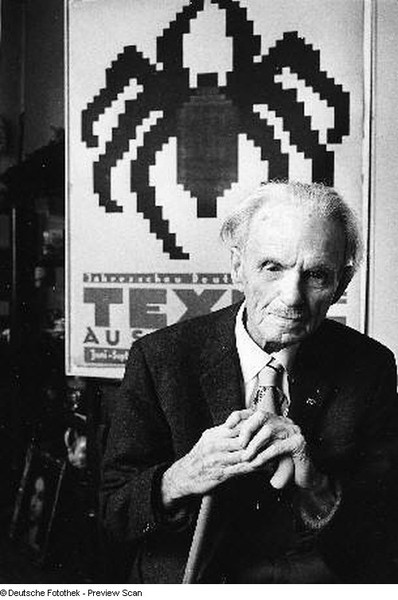
- Willy Petzold in 1975
- Born: 6 September 1885; Mainz, Germany
- Died: 16 March 1978 (aged 92); Dresden, Germany
- Occupation: Painter

Willy Petzold (6 September 1885 – 16 March 1978) was a German painter. His work was part of the painting event in the art competition at the 1936 Summer Olympics.
