= Jean-Louis Clerc =

Swiss painter

- Born: 3 November 1908; Neuchâtel, Switzerland
- Died: 28 March 1961 (aged 52); Sorengo, Switzerland
- Occupation: Painter

Jean-Louis Clerc (3 November 1908 – 28 March 1961) was a Swiss painter. His work was part of the painting event in the art competition at the 1936 Summer Olympics.
