= Gerhard Gyllenhammar =

Swedish painter

- Born: 7 February 1873; Stockholm, Sweden
- Died: 16 September 1968 (aged 95); Stockholm, Sweden
- Occupation: Painter

Gerhard Gyllenhammar (7 February 1873 – 16 September 1968) was a Swedish painter. His work was part of the painting event in the art competition at the 1936 Summer Olympics.
