= Lodew Bosscke =

Belgian painter

- Born: 1900; Schaerbeek, Belgium
- Died: 1980 (aged 79–80); Brussels, Belgium
- Occupation: Painter

Lodew Bosscke (1900, Schaerbeek – 1980, Brussels) was a Belgian painter. His work was part of the painting event in the art competition at the 1936 Summer Olympics.
