= Stig Munthe-Sandberg =

Swedish painter

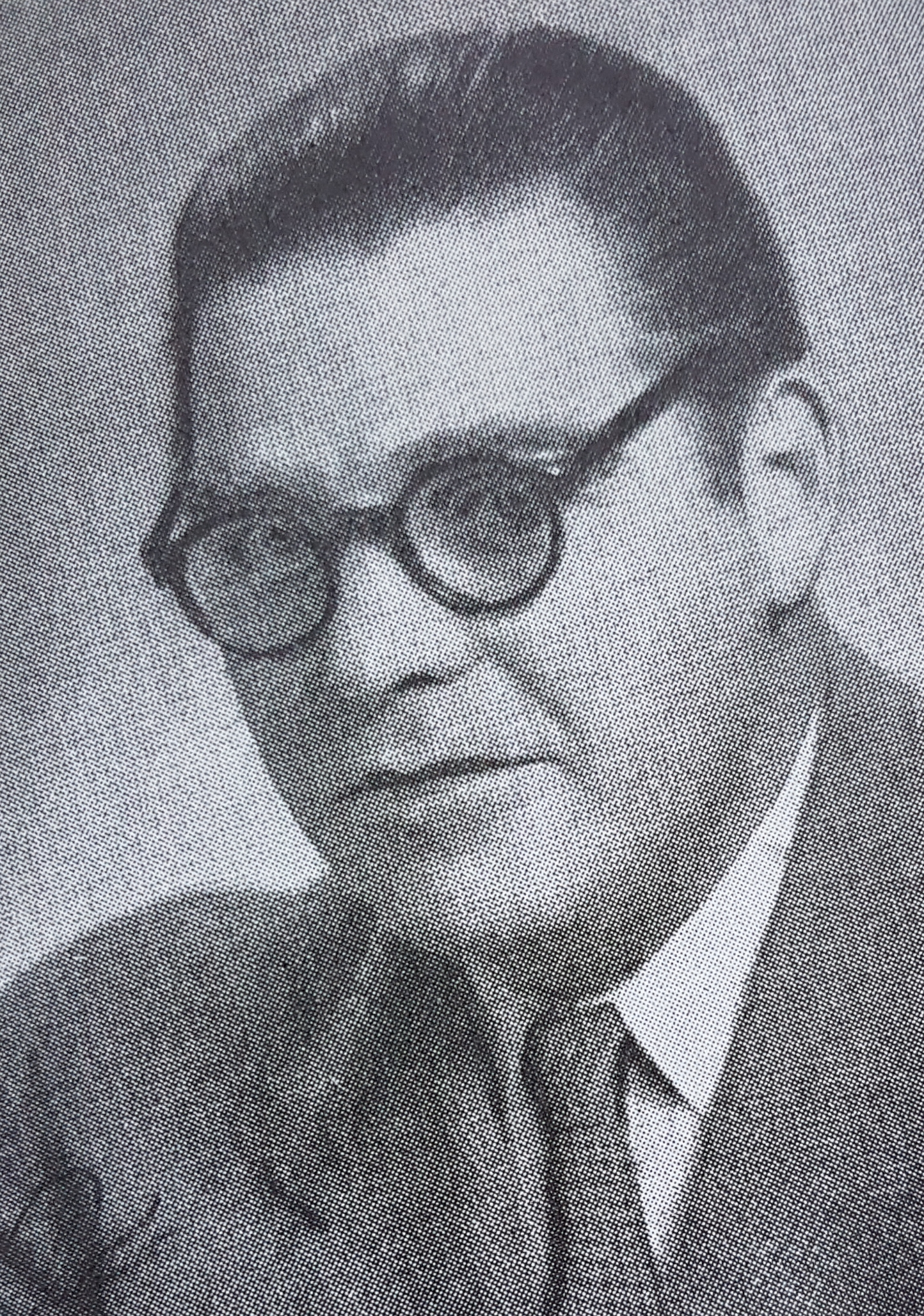
- Born: 4 August 1903; Stockholm, Sweden
- Died: 8 April 1950 (aged 46); Djursholm, Sweden
- Occupation: Painter

Stig Munthe-Sandberg (4 August 1903 – 8 April 1950) was a Swedish painter. His work was part of the painting event in the art competition at the 1936 Summer Olympics.
