= Ritsudo Kobayashi =

Japanese painter (1903–1974)

- Born: 1903; Tokyo, Japan
- Died: 1974 (aged 70–71)
- Occupation: Painter

Ritsudo Kobayashi (1903 – 1974) was a Japanese painter. His work was part of the painting event in the art competition at the 1936 Summer Olympics.
