= Gé Hurkmans =

Dutch painter

- Born: 20 May 1911; Tilburg, Netherlands
- Died: 11 August 1984 (aged 73); Amsterdam, Netherlands
- Occupation: Painter

Gé Hurkmans (20 May 1911 – 11 August 1984) was a Dutch painter. His work was part of the painting event in the art competition at the 1936 Summer Olympics.
