= Oskar Reichert =

American architect (1900–1970)

- Born: June 27, 1900; Frankfurt, Germany
- Died: November 21, 1970 (aged 70); Reading, Pennsylvania, United States
- Occupation: Architect

Oskar Reichert (July 27, 1900 – November 21, 1970) was an American architect. His work was part of the architecture event in the art competition at the 1936 Summer Olympics.
