= Erna E. Wetzel =

American painter

- Born: October 11, 1899; Wisconsin, United States
- Died: March 17, 1992 (aged 92)
- Occupation: Painter

Erna E. Wetzel, also known by the stage name of Patricia Saubert-Wetzel; (October 11, 1899 – March 17, 1992) was an American painter. Her work was part of the painting event in the art competition at the 1936 Summer Olympics.
