= Hoka Iwabuchi =

Japanese painter

- Born: February 9, 1901; Shibata, Niigata
- Died: June 6, 1956 (aged 55); Setagaya
- Occupation: Painter

Hoka Iwabuchi (February 9, 1901 – June 6, 1956) was a Japanese painter. His work was part of the painting event in the art competition at the 1936 Summer Olympics.
