= Hans Stangl =

German sculptor

- Born: 8 March 1888; Munich, Germany
- Died: 25 September 1963 (aged 75); Munich, Germany
- Occupation: Sculptor

Hans Stangl (8 March 1888 – 25 September 1963) was a German sculptor. His work was part of the sculpture event in the art competition at the 1936 Summer Olympics.
