= Jan Strube =

Dutch painter

- Born: 20 September 1892; Amsterdam, Netherlands
- Died: 9 November 1985 (aged 93); Breda, Netherlands
- Occupation: Painter

Jan Strube (20 September 1892 – 9 November 1985) was a Dutch painter. His work was part of the painting event in the art competition at the 1936 Summer Olympics.
