= Ben Moolhuysen =

Dutch architect

- Born: 12 September 1896; Amsterdam, Netherlands
- Died: 12 December 1959 (aged 63); Sittard, Netherlands
- Occupation: Architect

Ben Moolhuysen (12 September 1896 – 12 December 1959) was a Dutch architect. His work was part of the architecture event in the art competition at the 1936 Summer Olympics.
