= Amedeo D'Albora =

Italian architect

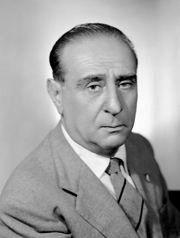
- Amedeo D'Albora in 1958
- Born: 10 January 1896; Naples, Italy
- Died: 30 November 1980 (aged 84); Naples, Italy
- Occupation: Architect

Amedeo D'Albora (10 January 1896 – 30 November 1980) was an Italian architect. His work was part of the architecture event in the art competition at the 1936 Summer Olympics.
