= Hans Ruwoldt =

German sculptor

- Born: 15 February 1891; Hamburg, Germany
- Died: 16 October 1969 (aged 78); Hamburg, Germany
- Occupation: Sculptor

Hans Ruwoldt (15 February 1891 – 16 October 1969) was a German sculptor. His work was part of the sculpture event in the art competition at the 1936 Summer Olympics.
