= Jean Collard =

Belgian sculptor

- Born: 11 May 1881; Antwerp, Belgium
- Died: 1951 (aged 69–70); Brecht, Belgium
- Occupation: Sculptor

Jean Collard (11 May 1881 – 1951) was a Belgian sculptor. His work was part of the sculpture event in the art competition at the 1936 Summer Olympics.
