= Edmund Fabry =

German architect

- Born: 20 February 1892; Norderney, Germany
- Died: 14 November 1939 (aged 47); Wiesbaden, Germany
- Occupation: Architect

Edmund Fabry (20 February 1892 – 14 November 1939) was a German architect. His work was part of the architecture event in the art competition at the 1936 Summer Olympics.
