= Folke Persson =

Swedish painter

- Born: 23 January 1905; Gothenburg, Sweden
- Died: 24 July 1964 (aged 59); Gothenburg, Sweden
- Occupation: Painter

Folke Persson (23 January 1905 – 24 July 1964) was a Swedish painter. His work was part of the painting event in the art competition at the 1936 Summer Olympics.
