= John Sjösvärd =

Swedish painter

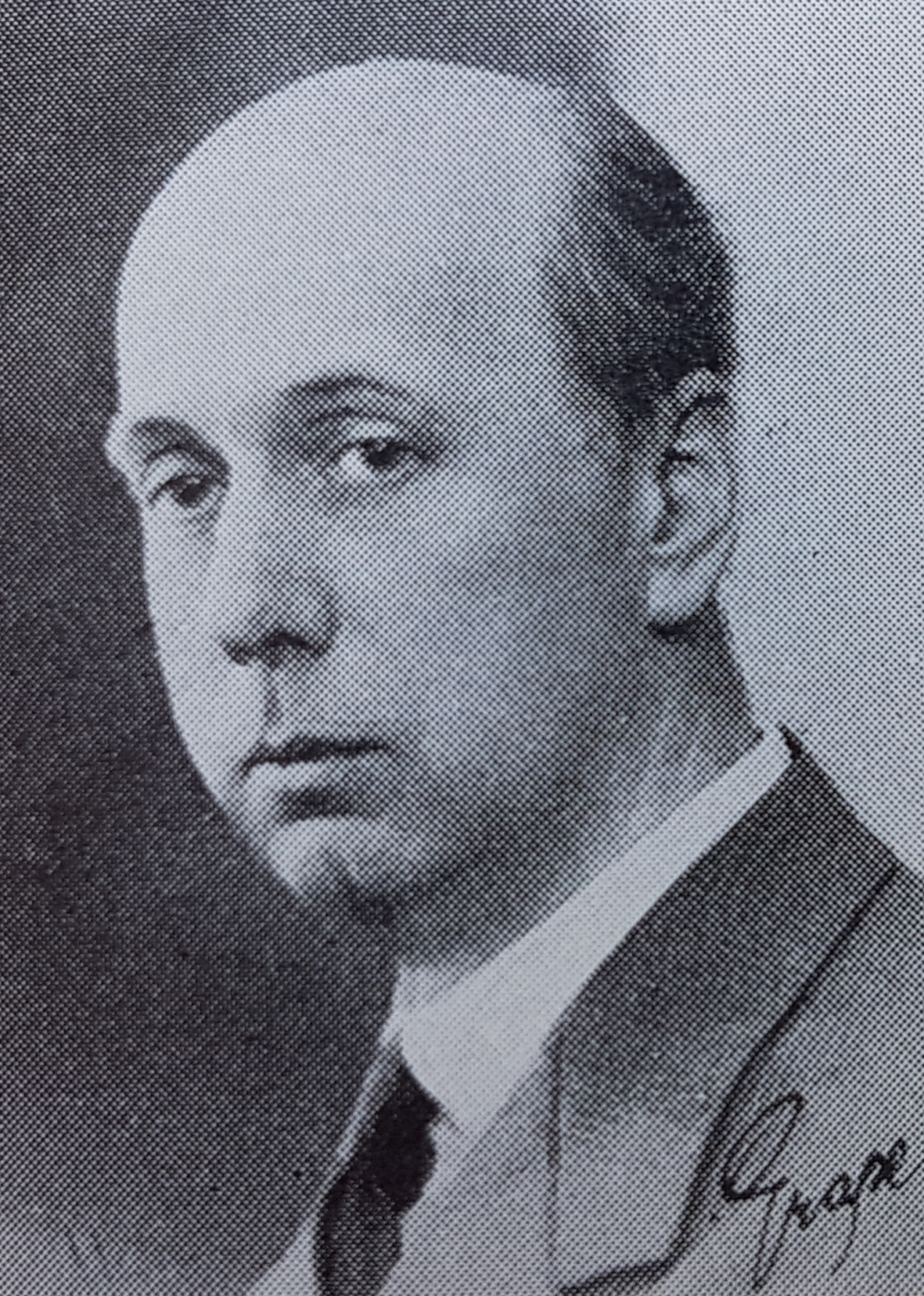
- Born: 7 May 1890; Linköping, Sweden
- Died: 13 December 1958 (aged 68); Stockholm, Sweden
- Occupation: Painter

John Sjösvärd (7 May 1890 – 13 December 1958) was a Swedish painter. His work was part of the painting event in the art competition at the 1936 Summer Olympics.
