= Dora Corty-Mönkemeyer =

German painter

- Born: 27 April 1890; Dresden, Kingdom of Saxony, German Empire
- Died: 17 February 1970 (aged 79); Dresden, East Germany
- Occupation: Painter

Dora Corty-Mönkemeyer (27 April 1890 – 17 February 1970) was a German painter. Her work was part of the painting event in the art competition at the 1936 Summer Olympics.

== Works ==
One of her most important works is the poster for the 2nd German Art Exhibition in Dresden in 1949, which shows a stylized dove of peace. When the 1st prize competition for the best German poster was held in the Federal Republic of Germany in 1950, Mönkemeyer-Corty's poster was the only East German poster to be selected by the jury.

Designed between 1910 and 1914, the poster for wire mesh by the Dresden-based company Louis Hermann is now part of the collection of the German Historical Museum with the inventory number P 57/605.
