= Jan Pešta =

Czech composer

- Born: 15 March 1883; Sušice, Austria-Hungary
- Died: 26 January 1945 (aged 61); Prague, Protectorate of Bohemia and Moravia
- Occupation: Composer

Jan Pešta (15 March 1883 – 26 January 1945) was a Czech composer. His work was part of the music event in the art competition at the 1936 Summer Olympics.
