= Sanya Nakade =

Japanese painter

- Born: 1897; Tokyo, Japan
- Died: 1971 (aged 73–74); Matsusaka, Japan
- Occupation: Painter

Sanya Nakade (1897–1971) was a Japanese painter. His work was part of the painting event in the art competition at the 1936 Summer Olympics.
