= Hajime Ishimaru =

Japanese painter

- Born: 1890; Komatsushima, Japan
- Died: 1990 (aged 99–100)
- Occupation: Painter

Hajime Ishimaru (1890–1990) was a Japanese painter. His work was part of the painting event in the art competition at the 1936 Summer Olympics.
