= Józef Oźmin =

Polish painter

- Born: 19 April 1903; Kalisz, Poland
- Died: 25 June 1999 (aged 96); Ireland
- Occupation: Painter

Józef Oźmin (19 April 1903 – 25 June 1999) was a Polish painter. His work was part of the painting event in the art competition at the 1936 Summer Olympics.
