= Shingo Yamada =

Japanese painter

- Born: 15 December 1908; Tokyo, Japan
- Died: 7 July 1977 (aged 68); Tokyo, Japan
- Occupation: Painter

Shingo Yamada (15 December 1908 – 7 July 1977) was a Japanese painter. His work was part of the painting event in the art competition at the 1936 Summer Olympics.
