= Herbert Dimmel =

Austrian painter

- Born: 31 August 1894; Ried im Innkreis, Austria-Hungary
- Died: 21 October 1980 (aged 86); Linz, Austria
- Occupation: Painter

Herbert Dimmel (31 August 1894 – 21 October 1980) was an Austrian painter. His work was part of the painting event in the art competition at the 1936 Summer Olympics.
