= Louis Szanto =

American painter

- Born: October 8, 1889; Vác, Austria-Hungary
- Died: March 15, 1965 (aged 75); New York, New York, United States
- Occupation: Painter

Louis Szanto (October 8, 1889 – March 15, 1965) was a Hungarian-American painter. His work was part of the painting event in the art competition at the 1936 Summer Olympics.
