= Renzo Massarani =

Italian composer

- Born: 26 March 1898; Mantua, Italy
- Died: 28 March 1975 (aged 77); Rio de Janeiro, Brazil
- Occupation: Composer

Renzo Massarani (26 March 1898 – 28 March 1975) was an Italian composer. His work was part of the music event in the art competition at the 1936 Summer Olympics.
