= Poul Bille-Holst =

Danish painter

- Born: 15 June 1894; Frederiksberg, Denmark
- Died: 9 February 1959 (aged 64); Esbønderup, Denmark
- Occupation: Painter

Poul Bille-Holst (15 June 1894 – 9 February 1959) was a Danish painter. His work was part of the painting event in the art competition at the 1936 Summer Olympics.
