= Václav Nejtek =

Czech sculptor

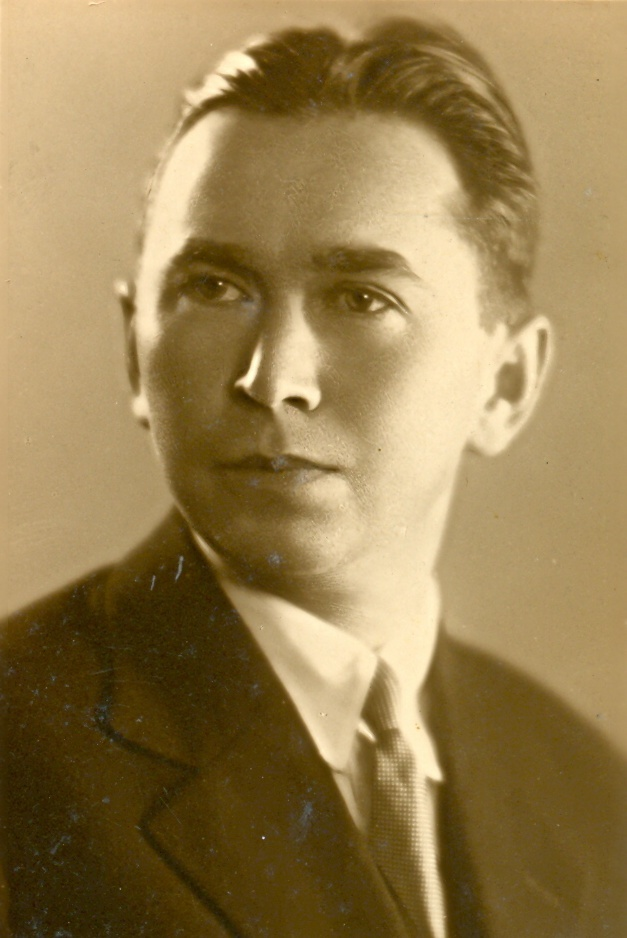
- Born: 23 September 1899; Moscow, Russia
- Died: 26 August 1958 (aged 58); Prague, Czechoslovakia
- Occupation: Sculptor

Václav Nejtek (23 September 1899 – 26 August 1958) was a Czech sculptor. His work was part of the sculpture event in the art competition at the 1936 Summer Olympics.
