= Theron Newell =

American writer

- Born: July 10, 1916; Kansas City, Kansas, United States
- Died: August 1, 1993 (aged 77); Marin County, California, United States
- Occupation: Writer

Theron Newell (July 10, 1916 – August 1, 1993) was an American writer. His work was part of the literature event in the art competition at the 1936 Summer Olympics.
