= Ludwig Kunstmann =

German sculptor

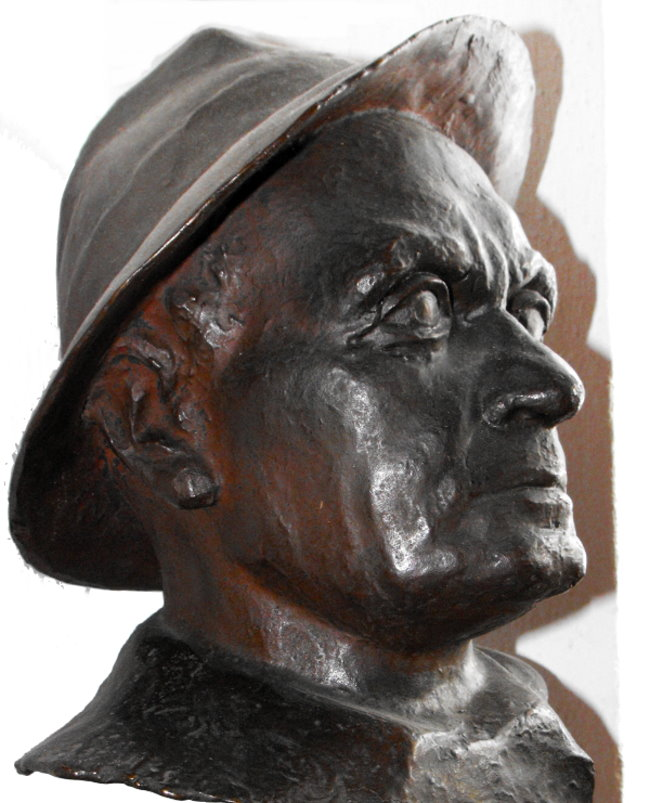
- Born: 9 December 1877; Regensburg, Germany
- Died: 27 March 1961 (aged 83); Hamburg, Germany
- Occupation: Sculptor

Ludwig Kunstmann (9 December 1877 – 27 March 1961) was a German sculptor. His work was part of the sculpture event in the art competition at the 1936 Summer Olympics.
