= Johan Pootjes =

Dutch painter

- Born: 19 March 1882; Amsterdam, Netherlands
- Died: 30 October 1944 (aged 62); Laren, Netherlands
- Occupation: Painter

Johan Pootjes (19 March 1882 – 30 October 1944) was a Dutch painter. His work was part of the painting event in the art competition at the 1936 Summer Olympics.
