= Eduard Sauer =

German painter (1899–1975)

- Born: 20 April 1899; Nuremberg, Germany
- Died: 28 January 1975 (aged 75); Nuremberg, Germany
- Occupation: Painter

Eduard Sauer (20 April 1899 – 28 January 1975) was a German painter. His work was part of the painting event in the art competition at the 1936 Summer Olympics.
