= Inosuke Hazama =

Japanese painter

- Born: 14 November 1895; Tokyo, Japan
- Died: 16 August 1977 (aged 81); Kaga, Japan
- Occupation: Painter

Inosuke Hazama (14 November 1895 – 16 August 1977) was a Japanese painter. His work was part of the painting event in the art competition at the 1936 Summer Olympics.
