= Mario Gamero =

Italian painter

- Born: 6 June 1902; Turin, Italy
- Died: 20 June 1983 (aged 81); Turin, Italy
- Occupation: Painter

Mario Gamero (6 June 1902 – 20 June 1983) was an Italian painter. His work was part of the painting event in the art competition at the 1936 Summer Olympics.
