= Edward Bruce Douglas =

American sculptor

- Born: November 6, 1886; Cedar Rapids, Iowa, United States
- Died: February 6, 1946 (aged 59); San Francisco, California, United States
- Occupation: Sculptor

Edward Bruce Douglas (November 6, 1886 – February 6, 1946) was an American sculptor. His work was part of the sculpture event in the art competition at the 1936 Summer Olympics.
