= Otto Scheffels =

German painter

- Born: 2 March 1897; Venlo, Netherlands
- Died: 4 November 1955 (aged 58); Mannheim, Germany
- Occupation: Painter

Otto Scheffels (2 March 1897 – 4 November 1955) was a German painter. His work was part of the painting event in the art competition at the 1936 Summer Olympics.
