= Aroldo Bellini =

Italian sculptor

- Born: 8 February 1902; Perugia, Italy
- Died: 14 October 1984 (aged 82); Rome, Italy
- Occupation: Sculptor

Aroldo Bellini (8 February 1902 – 14 October 1984) was an Italian sculptor. His work was part of the sculpture event in the art competition at the 1936 Summer Olympics.
