= Asaji Kobayashi =

Japanese painter

- Born: 10 January 1898; Suzaka, Japan
- Died: 5 August 1939 (aged 41); Suzaka, Japan
- Occupation: Painter

Asaji Kobayashi (Japanese: 小林 朝治, 10 January 1898 – 5 August 1939) was a Japanese ophthalmologist and painter. His work was part of the painting event in the art competition at the 1936 Summer Olympics in Berlin. His most famous work was a print series called Shin Nihon Hyakkei ("One Hundred Views of New Japan").

== Personal life ==
He originally trained as a physician at Kanazawa Medical College, graduating in 1921 and becoming an ophthalmologist.

He died in 1939 at the age of 41, of suicide.
