= Eiho Sato =

Japanese painter

- Born: 1909
- Died: 1969 (aged 59–60)
- Occupation: Painter

Eiho Sato (佐藤 永芳, Satō Eihō; 1909 – 1969) was a Japanese painter. His work was part of the painting event in the art competition at the 1936 Summer Olympics.
