= Junichiro Ishikawa =

Japanese architect

- Born: 1897; Yokohama, Japan
- Died: 1987 (aged 89–90)
- Occupation: Architect

Junichiro Ishikawa (1897 – 1987) was a Japanese architect. His work was part of the architecture event in the art competition at the 1936 Summer Olympics.
