= Wolter Bakker =

Dutch architect

- Born: 18 November 1888; Wanneperveen, Netherlands
- Died: 16 December 1970 (aged 82); Baarn, Netherlands
- Occupation: Architect

Wolter Bakker (18 November 1888 – 16 December 1970) was a Dutch architect. His work was part of the architecture event in the art competition at the 1936 Summer Olympics.
