= Bengt Tandberg =

Swedish painter

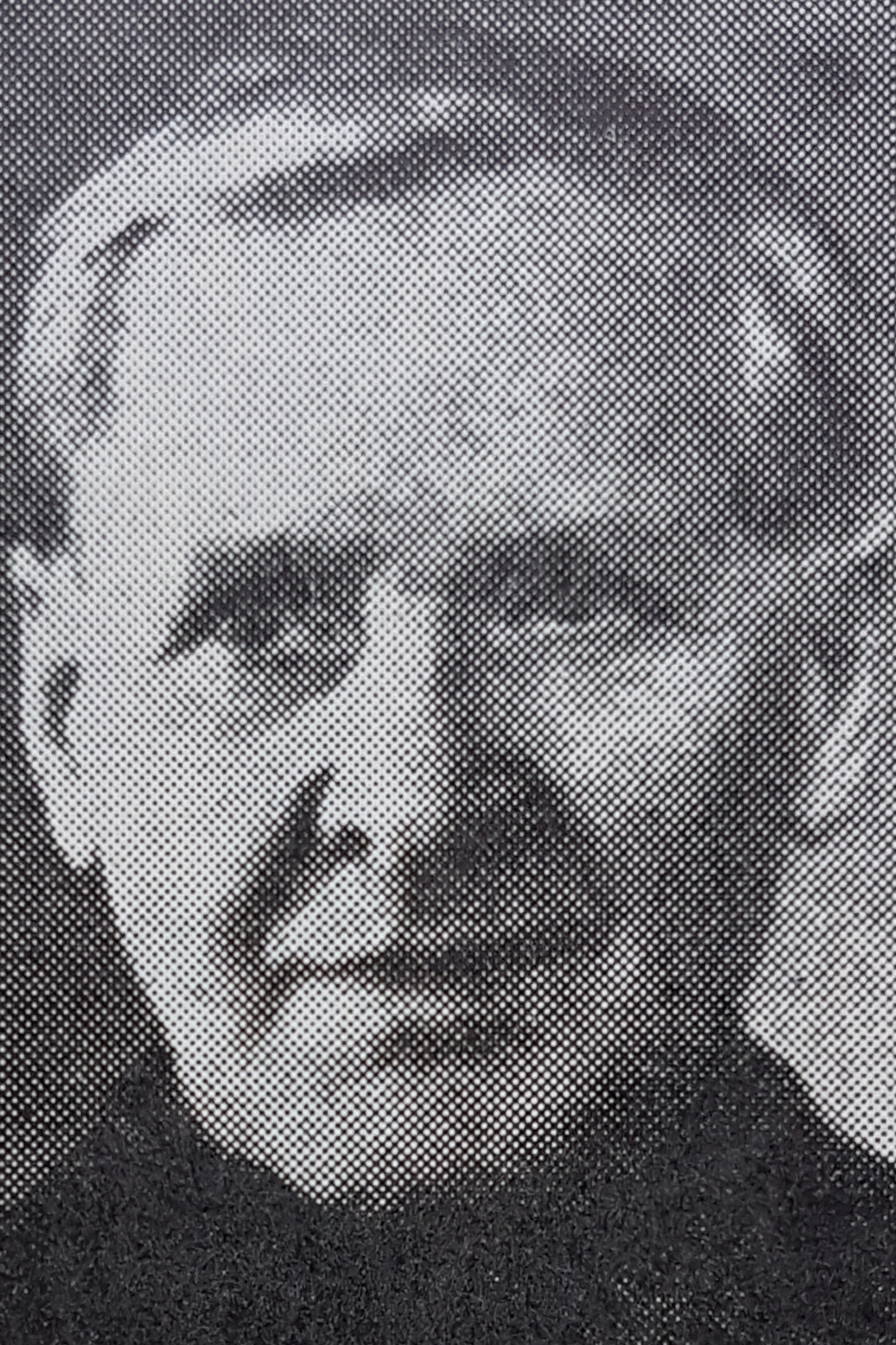
- Bengt Tandberg
- Born: 14 December 1874; Stockholm, Sweden
- Died: 1 August 1948 (aged 73); Stockholm, Sweden
- Occupation: Painter

Bengt Tandberg (14 December 1874 – 1 August 1948) was a Swedish painter. His work was part of the painting event in the art competition at the 1936 Summer Olympics.
