= Alexander Langeweg =

Dutch composer

- Born: 30 March 1890; Arnhem, Netherlands
- Died: 30 November 1961 (aged 71); The Hague, Netherlands
- Occupation: Composer

Alexander Langeweg (30 March 1890 – 30 November 1961) was a Dutch composer. His work was part of the music event in the art competition at the 1936 Summer Olympics.
