= Aldo Buttini =

Italian sculptor

- Born: 6 December 1898; Carrara, Italy
- Died: 1 December 1957 (aged 58); Carrara, Italy
- Occupation: Sculptor

Aldo Buttini (6 December 1898 – 1 December 1957) was an Italian sculptor. His work was part of the sculpture event in the art competition at the 1936 Summer Olympics.
