= Aleksander Sołtan =

Polish painter

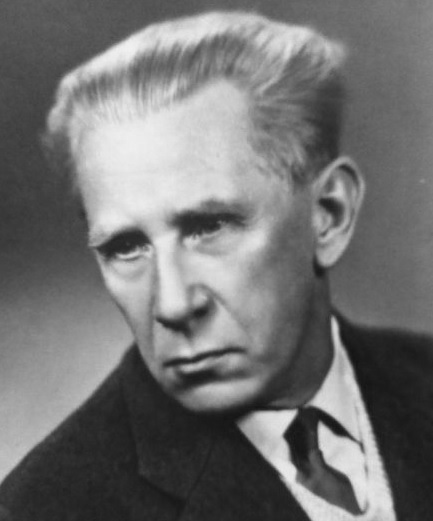
- Born: 31 July 1903; Kherson, Ukraine
- Died: 1994 (aged 90–91); Warsaw, Poland
- Occupation: Painter

Aleksander Sołtan (31 July 1903 – 1994) was a Polish painter. His work was part of the painting event in the art competition at the 1936 Summer Olympics.
