= Bohumil Kněžek =

Czech architect

- Born: 27 October 1900; Kunčice, Austria-Hungary
- Died: 25 September 1979 (aged 78); Sarasota, Florida, United States
- Occupation: Architect

Bohumil Kněžek (27 October 1900 – 25 September 1979) was a Czech architect. His work was part of the architecture event in the art competition at the 1936 Summer Olympics.
