= Nobushige Kusamitsu =

Japanese painter

- Born: 5 April 1892; Izumo, Japan
- Died: 21 December 1970 (aged 78); Tokyo, Japan
- Occupation: Painter

Nobushige Kusamitsu (草光 信成, Kusamitsu Nobushige; 5 April 1892 – 21 December 1970) was a Japanese painter. His work was part of the painting event in the art competition at the 1936 Summer Olympics.
