= Armando Barabino =

Italian painter

- Born: 16 September 1883; Genoa, Italy
- Died: 10 June 1970 (aged 86); Genoa, Italy
- Occupation: Painter

Armando Barabino (16 September 1883 – 10 June 1970) was an Italian painter. His work was part of the painting event in the art competition at the 1936 Summer Olympics.
