= Voldemārs Vimba =

Latvian painter

- Born: 31 May 1904; Saint Petersburg, Russia
- Died: September 1985; Riga, Latvia
- Occupation: Painter

Voldemārs Vimba (31 May 1904 – September 1985) was a Latvian painter. His work was part of the painting event in the art competition at the 1936 Summer Olympics.
