= Hironobu Kaneko =

Japanese painter

- Born: 5 June 1898; Kurume, Japan
- Died: 17 August 1988 (aged 90); Tokyo, Japan
- Occupation: Painter

Hironobu Kaneko (5 June 1898 – 17 August 1988) was a Japanese painter. His work was part of the painting event in the art competition at the 1936 Summer Olympics.
