= Hans Naderer =

Austrian writer

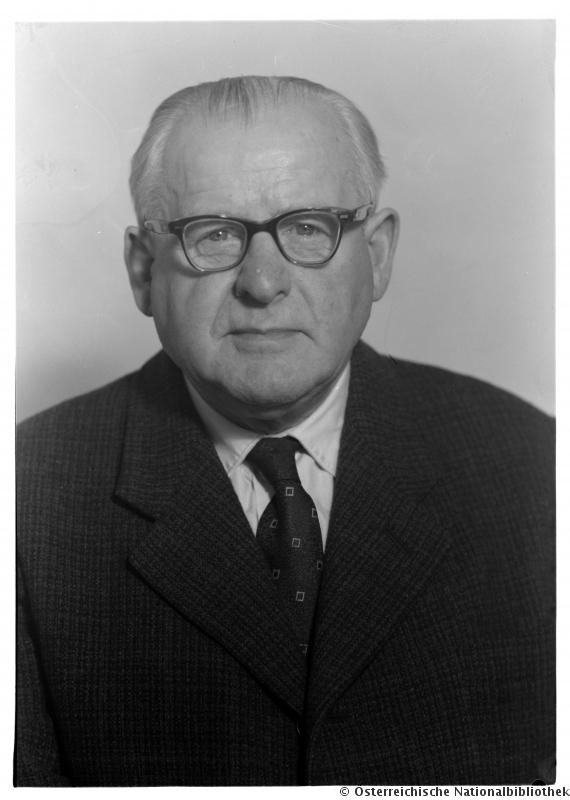
- Naderer in 1968
- Born: 10 January 1891; Oberstinkenbrunn, Austria-Hungary
- Died: 28 June 1971 (aged 80); Vienna, Austria
- Occupation: Writer

Hans Naderer (10 January 1891 – 28 June 1971) was an Austrian writer. His work was part of the literature event in the art competition at the 1936 Summer Olympics.
