= Nikola Mikhaylov =

Bulgarian painter

- Born: 30 January 1876; Shumen, Bulgaria
- Died: 20 May 1960 (aged 84); Hamburg, Germany
- Occupation: Painter

Nikola Mikhaylov (30 January 1876 – 20 May 1960) was a Bulgarian painter. His work was part of the painting event in the art competition at the 1936 Summer Olympics.
