= Rikizo Takata =

Japanese painter

- Born: 18 October 1900; Kurume, Japan
- Died: 31 October 1992 (aged 92); Itabashi, Japan
- Occupation: Painter

Rikizo Takata (18 October 1900 – 31 October 1992) was a Japanese painter. His work was part of the painting event in the art competition at the 1936 Summer Olympics.
