= Émile-Florent Lecomte =

Belgian painter

- Born: 2 May 1866; Braine-le-Comte, Belgium
- Died: 21 November 1938 (aged 72); Uccle, France
- Occupation: Painter

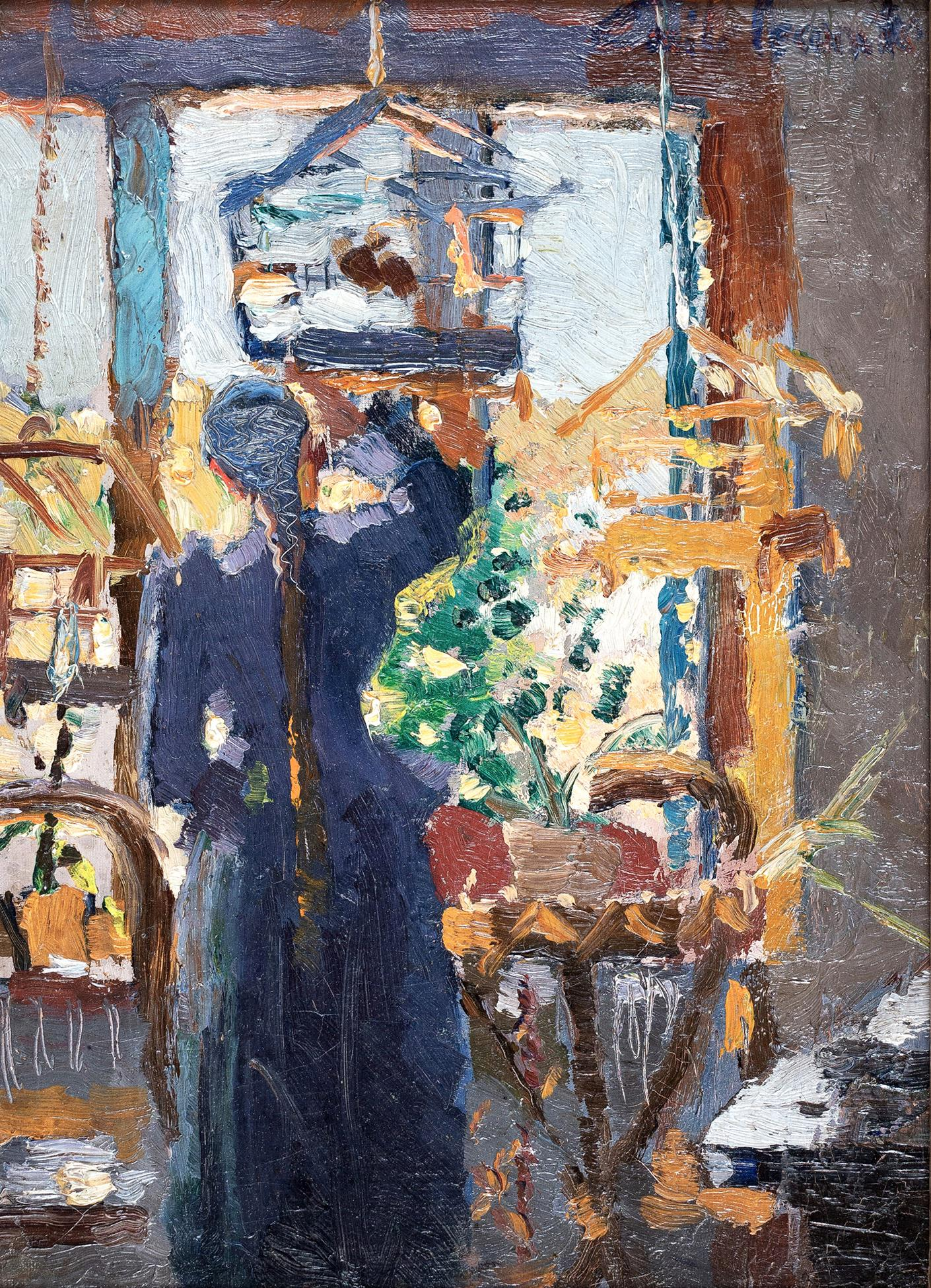
The Bird Cage (circa 1900)

Émile-Florent Lecomte (2 May 1866 – 21 November 1938) was a Belgian painter. His work was part of the painting event in the art competition at the 1936 Summer Olympics. He was born in Braine-le-Comte and died in Uccle.
