= Heinrich Rienössl =

Austrian writer

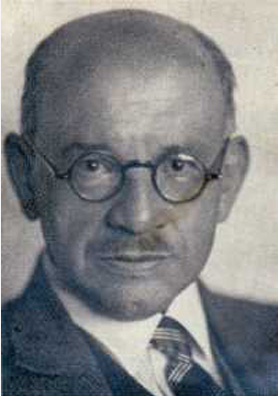
- Born: 4 June 1877; Vienna, Austria-Hungary
- Died: 18 December 1939 (aged 62); Vienna, Austria
- Occupation: Writer

Heinrich Rienössl (4 June 1877 – 18 December 1939) was an Austrian writer. His work was part of the literature event in the art competition at the 1936 Summer Olympics.
