= Franz Peydl =

Austrian architect

- Born: 17 March 1907; Vienna, Austria-Hungary
- Died: 30 March 1977 (aged 70); Vienna, Austria
- Occupation: Architect

Franz Peydl (17 March 1907 – 30 March 1977) was an Austrian architect. His work was part of the architecture event in the art competition at the 1936 Summer Olympics.
