= Georges Frédéric =

Belgian painter

- Born: 21 September 1900; Schaerbeek, Belgium
- Died: 28 February 1981 (aged 80); Schaerbeek, Belgium
- Occupation: Painter

Georges Frédéric (21 September 1900 – 28 February 1981) was a Belgian painter. His work was part of the painting event in the art competition at the 1936 Summer Olympics.
