= Ken Tasaka =

Japanese painter (1905–1997)

- Born: 1905; Tokyo, Japan
- Died: 1997 (aged 91–92)
- Occupation: Painter

Ken Tasaka (1905 – 1997) was a Japanese painter. His work was part of the painting event in the art competition at the 1936 Summer Olympics.
