= Luigi Velluti =

Italian sculptor (1908–1985)

- Born: 6 December 1908; Verona, Kingdom of Italy
- Died: 11 September 1985 (aged 76); Mirano, Italy
- Occupation: Sculptor

Luigi Velluti (6 December 1908 – 11 September 1985) was an Italian sculptor. His work was part of the sculpture event in the art competition at the 1936 Summer Olympics.
