= Alfons Riedel =

Austrian sculptor

- Born: 31 July 1901; Vienna, Austria-Hungary
- Died: 1 April 1969 (aged 67); Vienna, Austria
- Occupation: Sculptor

Alfons Riedel (31 July 1901 – 1 April 1969) was an Austrian sculptor. His work was included in the sculpture event at the art competition of the 1936 Summer Olympics.
