= Hermann Geibel =

German sculptor

- Born: 14 May 1889; Freiburg im Breisgau, Germany
- Died: 20 September 1972 (aged 83); Darmstadt, Germany
- Occupation: Sculptor

Hermann Geibel (14 May 1889 – 20 September 1972) was a German sculptor. His work was part of the sculpture event in the art competition at the 1936 Summer Olympics.
