= Erwin Ilz =

Austrian architect

- Born: 12 May 1891; Vienna, Austria-Hungary
- Died: 12 May 1954 (aged 63); Salzburg, Austria
- Occupation: Architect

Erwin Ilz (12 May 1891 – 12 May 1954) was an Austrian architect. His work was part of the architecture event in the art competition at the 1936 Summer Olympics.

With his partner Erwin Böck, Ilz won second prize in a competition to design New Belgrade.
