= Kamezo Shimizu =

Japanese sculptor

- Born: 30 March 1875; Hiroshima, Japan
- Died: 7 December 1948 (aged 73); Tokyo, Japan
- Other name: Nanzan Shimizu
- Occupation: Sculptor

Kamezo Shimizu (30 March 1875 – 7 December 1948) was a Japanese sculptor. His work was part of the sculpture event in the art competition at the 1936 Summer Olympics.
