= Alphonse Huylebroeck =

Belgian sculptor

- Born: 7 July 1910; Aalst, Belgium
- Died: 1990 (aged 79–80)
- Occupation: Sculptor

Alphonse Huylebroeck (7 July 1910 – 1990) was a Belgian sculptor. His work was part of the sculpture event in the art competition at the 1936 Summer Olympics.
