= Giulio Cisari =

Italian painter (1892–1979)

- Born: 7 May 1892; Como, Italy
- Died: 28 March 1979 (aged 86); Milan, Italy
- Occupation: Painter

Giulio Cisari (7 May 1892 – 28 March 1979) was an Italian painter. His work was part of the painting event in the art competition at the 1936 Summer Olympics.
