= Hans Pfann (architect) =

Austrian architect (1890–1973)

- Born: 20 August 1890; Vienna, Austria-Hungary
- Died: 16 August 1973 (aged 82); Vienna, Austria
- Occupation: Architect

Hans Pfann (20 August 1890 – 16 August 1973) was an Austrian architect. His work was part of the architecture event in the art competition at the 1936 Summer Olympics.
