= Eugen Niederer =

Swiss painter

- Born: 22 August 1881; Stuttgart, Germany
- Died: 28 January 1957 (aged 75); Basel, Switzerland
- Occupation: Painter

Eugen Niederer (22 August 1881 – 28 January 1957) was a Swiss painter. His work was part of the painting event in the art competition at the 1936 Summer Olympics.
