= Bertha Fanning Taylor =

American painter

- Born: July 30, 1883; New York, New York, United States
- Died: July 3, 1980 (aged 96); Norfolk, Virginia, United States
- Occupation: Painter

Bertha Fanning Taylor (July 30, 1883 – July 3, 1980) was an American painter. Her work was part of the painting event in the art competition at the 1936 Summer Olympics.
