= Henri Zwiers =

Dutch architect

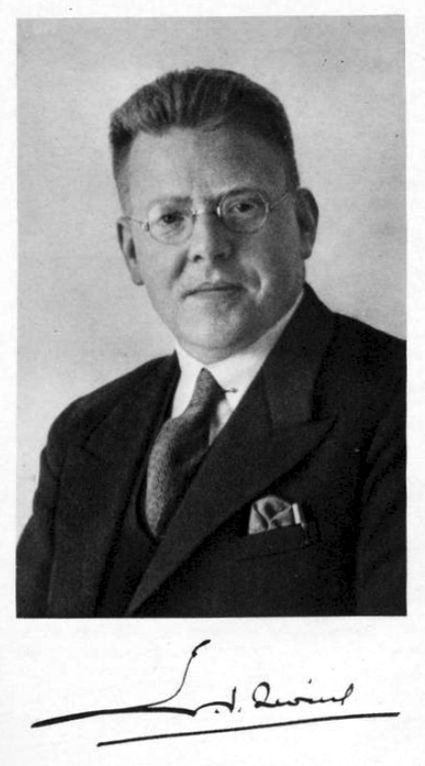
- Prof. Ir. H. T. Zwiers, 1940.
- Born: 10 February 1900; Amsterdam, Netherlands
- Died: 2 June 1992 (aged 92); Haarlem, Netherlands
- Occupation: Architect

Henri Zwiers (10 February 1900 – 2 June 1992) was a Dutch architect. His work was part of the architecture event in the art competition at the 1936 Summer Olympics.
