= Werner Primm =

German sculptor

- Born: 6 March 1904; Legnica, Poland
- Died: 1988 (aged 83–84); Kronach, Germany
- Occupation: Sculptor

Werner Primm (6 March 1904 – 1988) was a German sculptor. His work was part of the sculpture event in the art competition at the 1936 Summer Olympics.
