= Luciano Mercante =

Italian sculptor

Olympic medal record

Art competitions
Silver medal – second place	1936 Berlin	Medals

Luciano Mercante (4 September 1902 – 15 January 1982) was an Italian sculptor. In 1936 he won a silver medal in the art competitions of the Olympic Games for his "Medaglie" ("Medals").
