= Herbert von Reyl =

Austrian painter

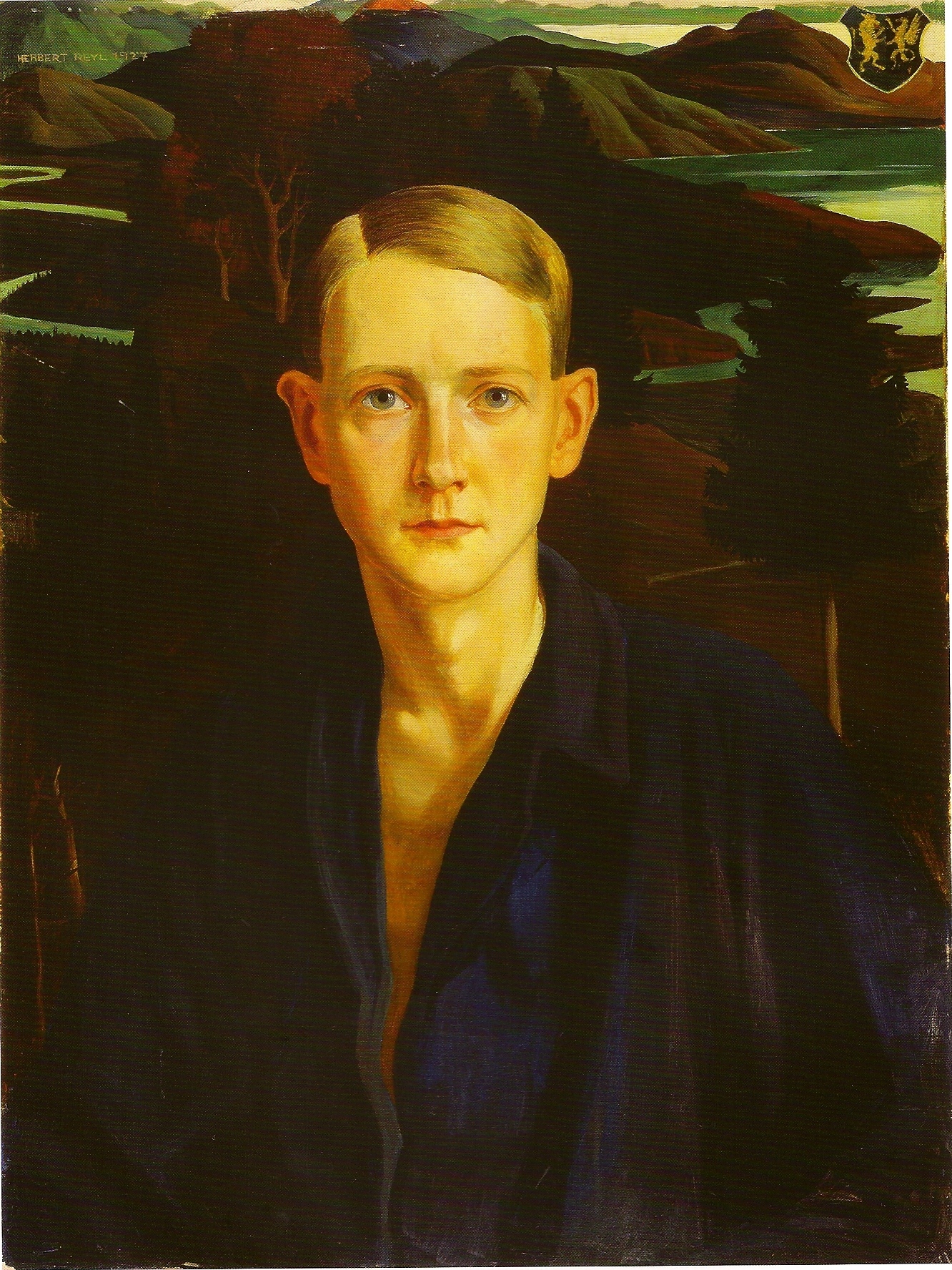
- Self-portrait (1927)
- Born: 28 April 1898; Vienna, Austria-Hungary
- Died: 11 June 1937 (aged 39); Bregenz, Austria
- Occupation: Painter

Herbert von Reyl (28 April 1898 – 11 June 1937) was an Austrian painter. His work was part of the painting event in the art competition at the 1936 Summer Olympics.
