= Tsuruzo Ishii =

Japanese painter

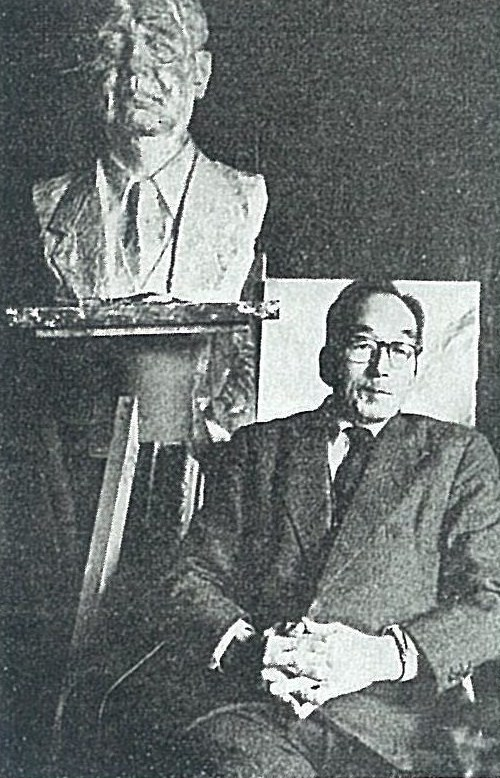
- Born: 5 June 1887; Tokyo, Japan
- Died: 17 March 1973 (aged 85); Tokyo, Japan
- Occupation: Painter

Tsuruzo Ishii (5 June 1887 – 17 March 1973) was a Japanese painter and sculptor. His work was part of the painting event in the art competition at the 1936 Summer Olympics.
