= Carl Reiser =

German painter

- Born: 5 June 1877; Garmisch-Partenkirchen, Germany
- Died: 17 June 1950 (aged 73); Garmisch-Partenkirchen, Germany
- Occupation: Painter

Carl Reiser (5 June 1877 – 17 June 1950) was a German painter. His work was part of the painting event in the art competition at the 1936 Summer Olympics.
