= Hartmuth Pfeil =

German painter

- Born: 13 February 1893; Frankfurt, Germany
- Died: 4 June 1962 (aged 69); Darmstadt, Germany
- Occupation: Painter

Hartmuth Pfeil (13 February 1893 – 4 June 1962) was a German painter. His work was part of the painting event in the art competition at the 1936 Summer Olympics.
