= Fred Jent =

Swiss writer

- Born: 1894
- Died: 14 August 1979 (aged 84–85); Basel, Switzerland
- Occupation: Writer

Fred Jent (1894 – 14 August 1979) was a Swiss writer. His work was part of the literature event in the art competition at the 1936 Summer Olympics.
