= Tenyo Ohta =

Japanese painter

- Born: 1884; Tokyo, Japan
- Died: 24 February 1946 (aged 61–62)
- Occupation: Painter

Tenyo Ohta (1884 – 24 February 1946) was a Japanese painter. His work was part of the painting event in the art competition at the 1936 Summer Olympics.
