= Pinetta Colonna-Gamero =

Italian painter

- Born: 11 April 1905; Turin, Italy
- Died: 27 September 1996 (aged 87); Turin, Italy
- Occupation: Painter

Pinetta Colonna-Gamero (11 April 1905 – 27 September 1996) was an Italian painter. Her work was part of the painting event in the art competition at the 1936 Summer Olympics.
