= Adolf Dahle =

German painter

- Born: 2 October 1890; Hanover, Germany
- Died: 1 November 1954 (aged 64); Berlin, Germany
- Occupation: Painter

Adolf Dahle (2 October 1890 – 1 November 1954) was a German painter. His work was part of the painting event in the art competition at the 1936 Summer Olympics.
