= Shumin Ota =

Japanese painter

- Born: 1884; Hirata, Japan
- Died: 15 May 1950 (aged 65–66)
- Occupation: Painter

Shumin Ota (1884 – 15 May 1950) was a Japanese painter. His work was part of the painting event in the art competition at the 1936 Summer Olympics.
