= Helge Zandén =

Swedish painter

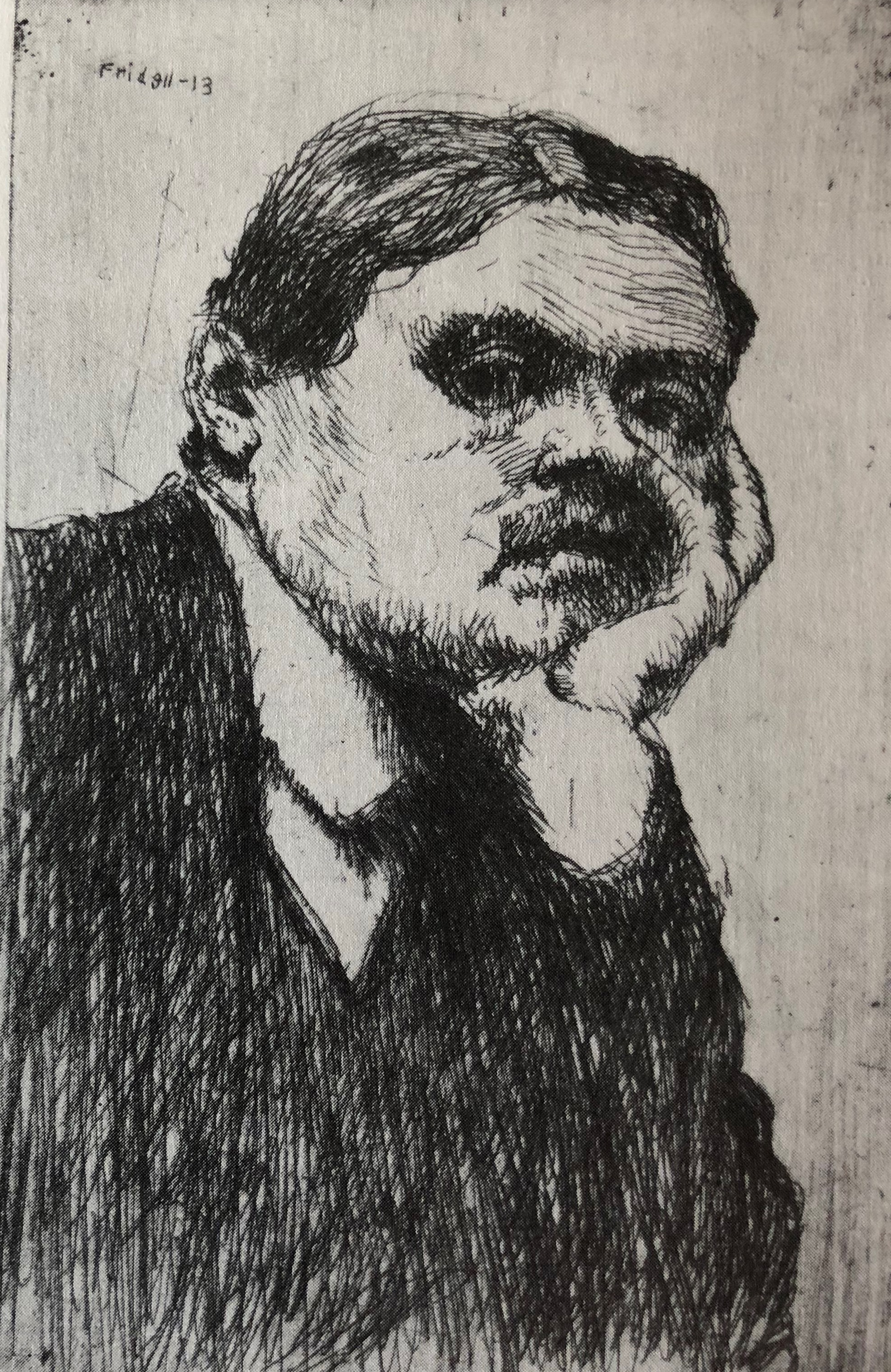
- Born: 23 July 1886; Borås, Sweden
- Died: 9 January 1972 (aged 85); Falun, Sweden
- Occupation: Painter
- Spouse: Emma Skytt
- Children: 1

Helge Zandén (23 July 1886 – 9 January 1972) was a Swedish painter and sculptor. His work was part of the painting event in the art competition at the 1936 Summer Olympics.

He was born in Borås and studied at Althin's School of Painting. He married Emma Skytt; they had a son.

His sculpture Gruvarbetare was installed in Kopparberg in June 1967.
