= Léandre Grandmoulin =

Belgian sculptor

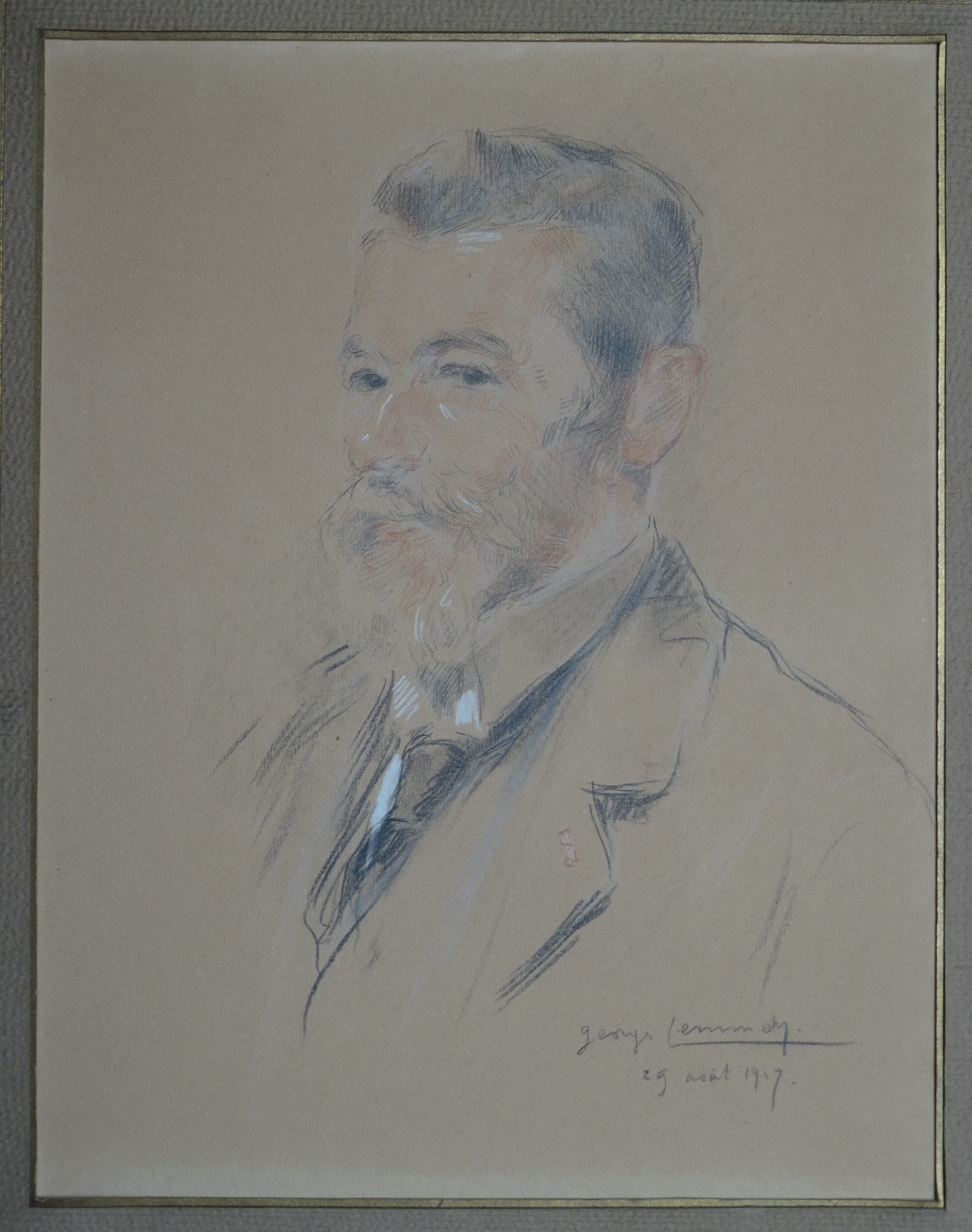
- Born: 12 November 1873; La Hulpe, Belgium
- Died: 10 March 1957 (aged 83); Uccle, Belgium
- Occupation: Sculptor

Léandre Grandmoulin (12 November 1873 – 10 March 1957) was a Belgian sculptor. His work was part of the sculpture event in the art competition at the 1936 Summer Olympics.
