= Saburo Kurata =

Japanese painter

- Born: 21 September 1902; Tokyo, Japan
- Died: 30 November 1992 (aged 90); Tokyo, Japan
- Occupation: Painter

Saburo Kurata (21 September 1902 – 30 November 1992) was a Japanese painter. His work was part of the painting event in the art competition at the 1936 Summer Olympics.
