= Lucjan Kintopf =

Polish painter

- Born: 12 March 1898; Warsaw, Poland
- Died: 11 December 1979 (aged 81); Łódź, Poland
- Occupation: Painter

Lucjan Kintopf (12 March 1898 – 11 December 1979) was a Polish painter. His work was part of the painting event in the art competition at the 1936 Summer Olympics.
