= Demetrij Žebre =

Slovenian composer

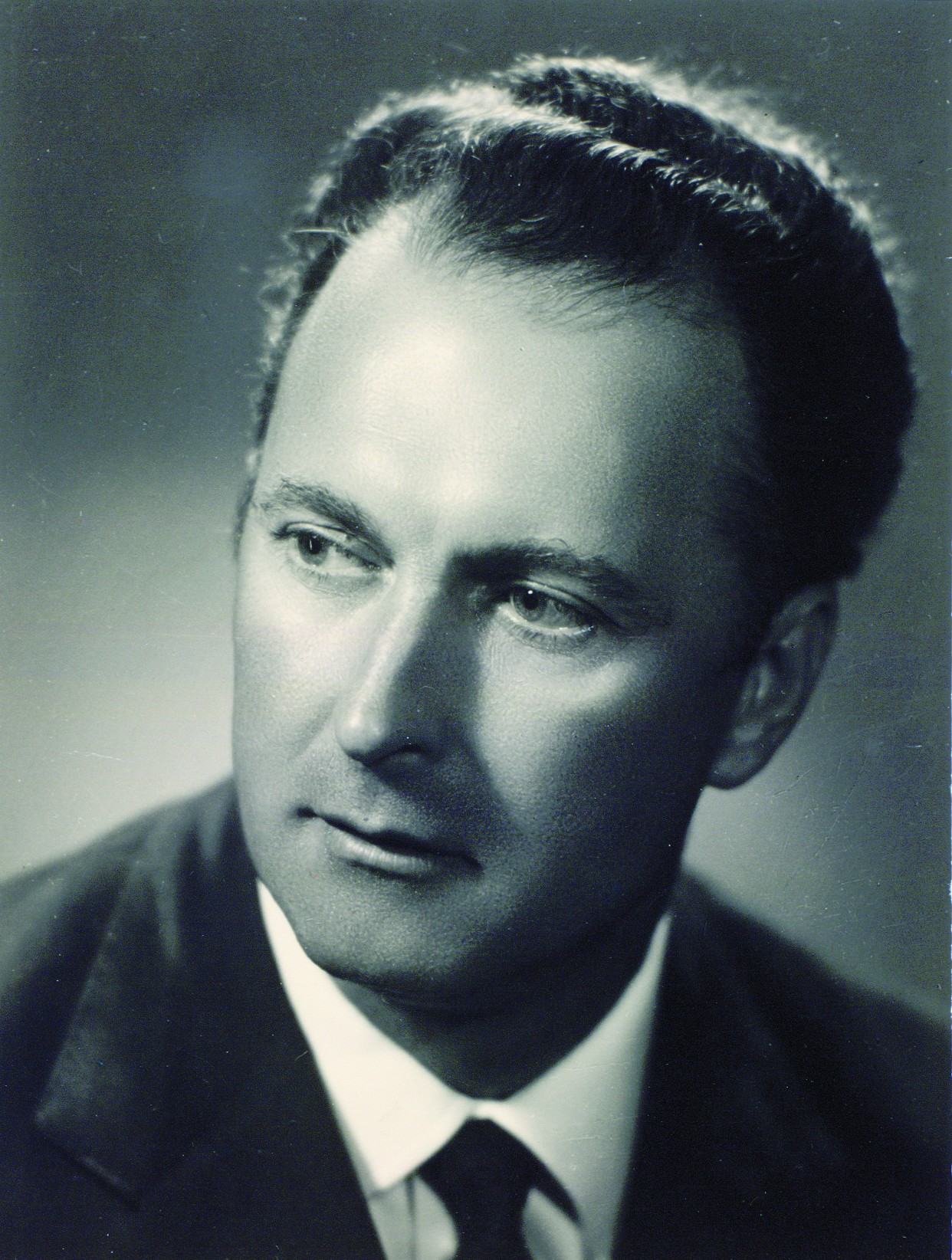
- Born: 22 December 1912; Ljubljana, Austria-Hungary
- Died: 13 March 1970 (aged 57); Ljubljana, Yugoslavia
- Occupation: Composer

Demetrij Žebre (22 December 1912 – 13 March 1970) was a Slovenian composer. His work was part of the music event in the art competition at the 1936 Summer Olympics.
