= Carlo Romagnoli =

Italian painter

- Born: 30 October 1888; Rome, Italy
- Died: 29 May 1965 (aged 76); Rome, Italy
- Occupation: Painter

Carlo Romagnoli (30 October 1888 – 29 May 1965) was an Italian painter. His work was part of the painting event in the art competition at the 1936 Summer Olympics.
