= Knud Gleerup =

Danish sculptor

- Born: 1 December 1884; Copenhagen, Denmark
- Died: 17 October 1960 (aged 75); Copenhagen, Denmark
- Occupation: Sculptor

Knud Gleerup (1 December 1884 – 17 October 1960) was a Danish sculptor. His work was part of the sculpture event in the art competition at the 1936 Summer Olympics.
