= Jan Boedts =

Belgian sculptor

Jan Boedts (1904–1973) was a Belgian sculptor. His work was part of the sculpture event in the art competition at the 1936 Summer Olympics.
