= Paul Dresse =

Belgian writer

- Born: 24 September 1901; Liège, Belgium
- Died: 4 February 1987 (aged 85); Ixelles, Belgium
- Occupation: Writer

Paul Dresse (24 September 1901 – 4 February 1987) was a Belgian writer. His work was part of the literature event in the art competition at the 1936 Summer Olympics.
