= Elizabeth Benson (sculptor) =

South African sculptor (1888–1976)

- Born: 11 May 1888; Kimberley, Cape Colony
- Died: 1976 (aged 87–88)
- Occupation: Sculptor

Elizabeth Benson (11 May 1888 – 1976) was a South African sculptor. Her work was part of the sculpture event in the art competition at the 1936 Summer Olympics.
