= Kosta Petrović =

Croatian architect

- Born: 31 May 1891; Klanjec, Austria-Hungary
- Died: 23 July 1965 (aged 74); Subotica, Yugoslavia
- Occupation: Architect

Kosta Petrović (31 May 1891 – 23 July 1965) was a Yugoslav architect. His work was part of the architecture event in the art competition at the 1936 Summer Olympics.
