= Ernst Ludwig Franke =

Austrian painter

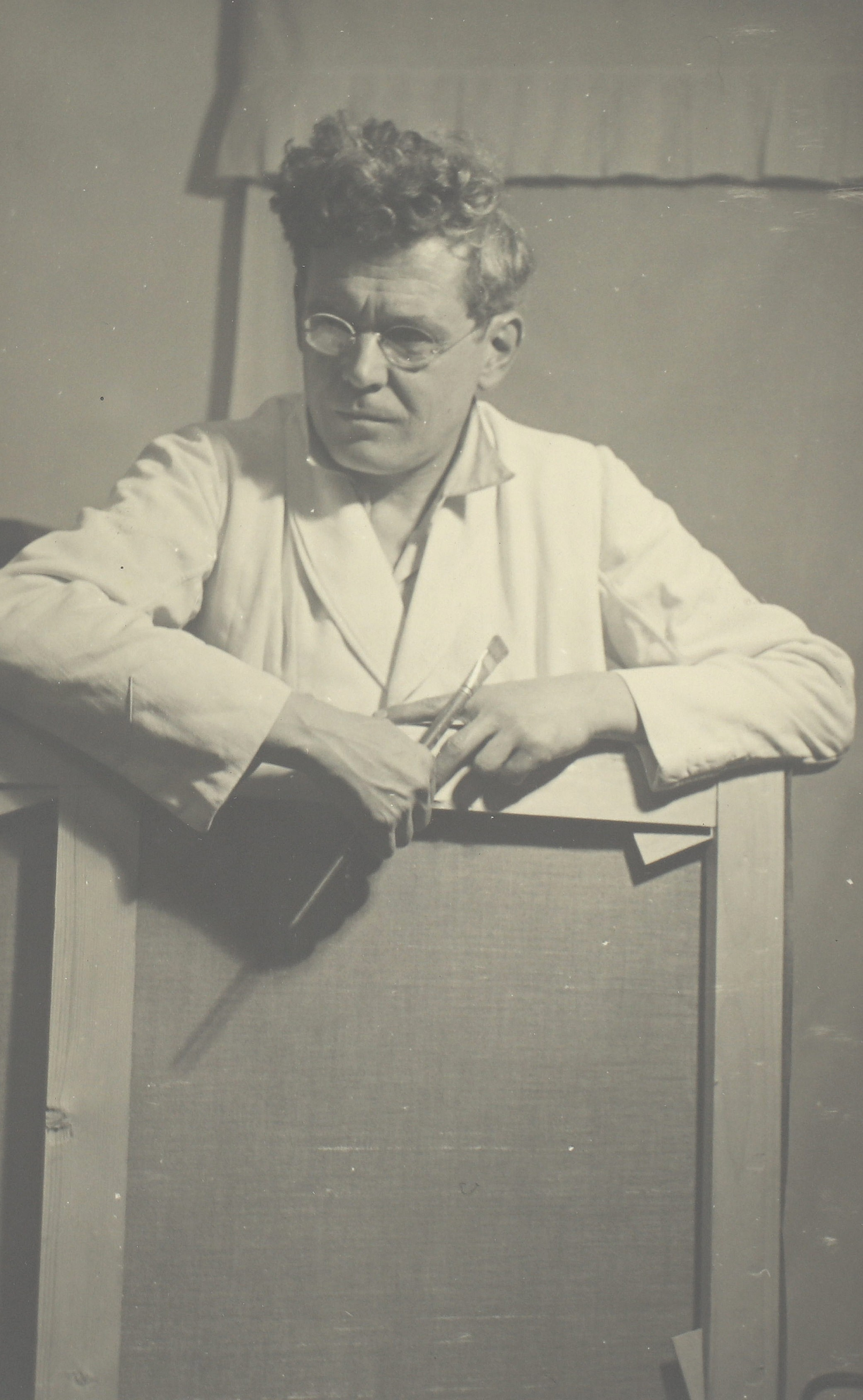
- Franke in his studio, c. 1940 – 1948
- Born: 23 August 1886; Vienna, Austria-Hungary
- Died: 28 December 1948 (aged 62); Vienna, Austria
- Occupation: Painter

Ernst Ludwig Franke (23 August 1886 – 28 December 1948) was an Austrian painter. His work was part of the painting event in the art competition at the 1936 Summer Olympics.
