= Wilhelm Frass =

Austrian sculptor

- Born: 29 May 1886; Sankt Pölten, Austria-Hungary
- Died: 1 November 1968 (aged 82); Vienna, Austria
- Occupation: Sculptor

Wilhelm Frass (29 May 1886 – 1 November 1968) was an Austrian sculptor. His work was part of the sculpture event in the art competition at the 1936 Summer Olympics.

Frass was one of the teachers of prominent Ukrainian–Canadian sculptor Leo Mol.

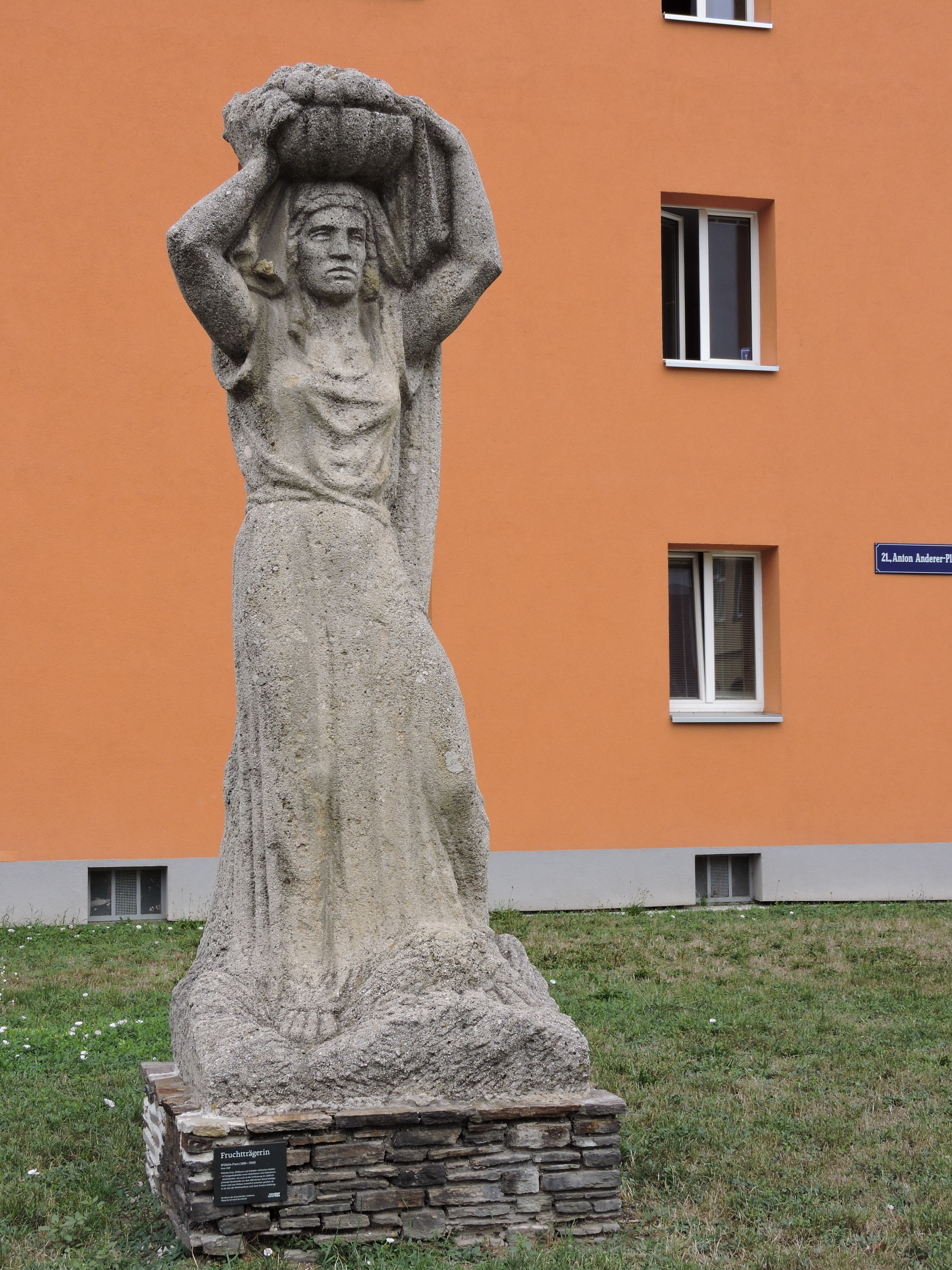
Statue of a lady carrying fruits by Frass, Vienna
