= Julien Lefèvre =

Luxembourgish sculptor

- Born: 1 July 1907; Esch-sur-Alzette, Luxembourg
- Died: 4 January 1984 (aged 76); Luxembourg, Luxembourg
- Occupation: Sculptor

Julien Lefèvre (1 July 1907 – 4 January 1984) was a Luxembourgish sculptor. His work was part of the sculpture event in the art competition at the 1936 Summer Olympics.

== Biography ==
Lefèvre sculpted portraits and painted landscapes, portraits and river views. In addition to his own work, Lefèvre and his wife designed stained-glass windows for several Luxembourg churches during the period of reconstruction after World War II, stamps, medals and Luxembourg francs (1962-1989), among other works. The joint works were signed as Julien et Nina Lefèvre, J.N. LEFEVRE, JNL and NJL, among others.
