= Josef Urbach =

German painter

- Born: 9 March 1889; Neuss, Germany
- Died: 8 October 1973 (aged 84); Essen, Germany
- Occupation: Painter

Josef Urbach (9 March 1889 – 8 October 1973) was a German painter. His work was part of the painting event in the art competition at the 1936 Summer Olympics.
