= František Draškovič =

Slovak sculptor

- Born: 5 April 1911; Mást, Austria-Hungary
- Died: 3 June 1979 (aged 68); Bratislava, Czechoslovakia
- Occupation: Sculptor

František Draškovič (5 April 1911 – 3 June 1979) was a Slovak sculptor. His work was part of the sculpture event in the art competition at the 1936 Summer Olympics.
