= Hermann Teuber =

German painter

- Born: 12 August 1894; Dresden, German Empire
- Died: 24 October 1985 (aged 91); Munich, West Germany
- Occupation: Painter

Hermann Teuber (12 August 1894 – 24 October 1985) was a German painter. His work was part of the painting event in the art competition at the 1936 Summer Olympics.
