= Johann Rezac =

Austrian architect

- Born: 27 April 1911; Wasenbruck, Austria-Hungary
- Died: 18 August 1998 (aged 87); Weidling, Austria
- Occupation: Architect

Johann Rezac (27 April 1911 – 18 August 1998) was an Austrian architect. His work was part of the architecture event in the art competition at the 1936 Summer Olympics.
