= Robert Frank (sculptor) =

Swiss sculptor

- Born: 13 February 1902; Basel, Switzerland
- Died: 22 June 1975 (aged 73); Basel, Switzerland
- Occupation: Sculptor

Robert Frank (13 February 1902 – 22 June 1975) was a Swiss sculptor. His work was part of the sculpture event in the art competition at the 1936 Summer Olympics.
