= Eugenio Barisoni =

Italian writer

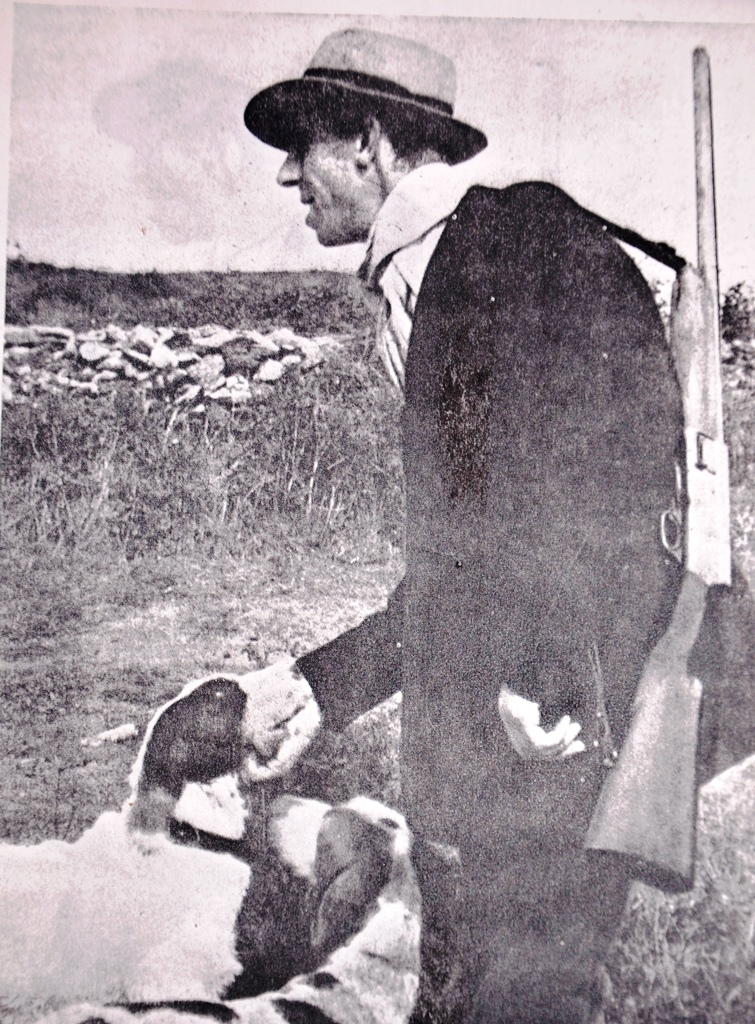
- Born: 8 July 1886; Novara, Italy
- Died: 31 March 1951 (aged 64); Sanremo, Italy
- Occupation: Writer

Eugenio Barisoni (8 July 1886 – 31 March 1951) was an Italian writer. His work was part of the literature event in the art competition at the 1936 Summer Olympics.
