= Henry Ziegler =

American painter

- Born: February 10, 1889; Sherman, Texas, United States
- Died: July 1968; New York, New York, United States
- Occupation: Painter

Henry Ziegler (February 10, 1889 – July 1968) was an American painter. His work was part of the painting event in the art competition at the 1936 Summer Olympics.
