= Oswald Roux =

Austrian painter (1880–1961)

- Born: 31 January 1880; Vienna, Austria-Hungary
- Died: 18 April 1961 (aged 81); Vienna, Austria
- Occupations: Painter, Graphic artist, Etcher & Lithographer

Oswald Roux (31 January 1880 – 18 April 1961) was a male Austrian painter and graphic artist. His work was part of the painting event in one of the art competitions at the 1936 Summer Olympics. He painted landscapes and animals, especially horses. He also was an etcher and lithographer. In the capital city of Austria, Vienna, Roux studied, and was a member of the Vienna Secession from 1907 to 1939. Roux was an official war artist during World War I. He organized the "First Great Carnival Ride" in Vienna on 19 February 1939. It was the first one held after the Anschluss and was heavily organized by the Nazis. The event functioned as a propaganda showcase.

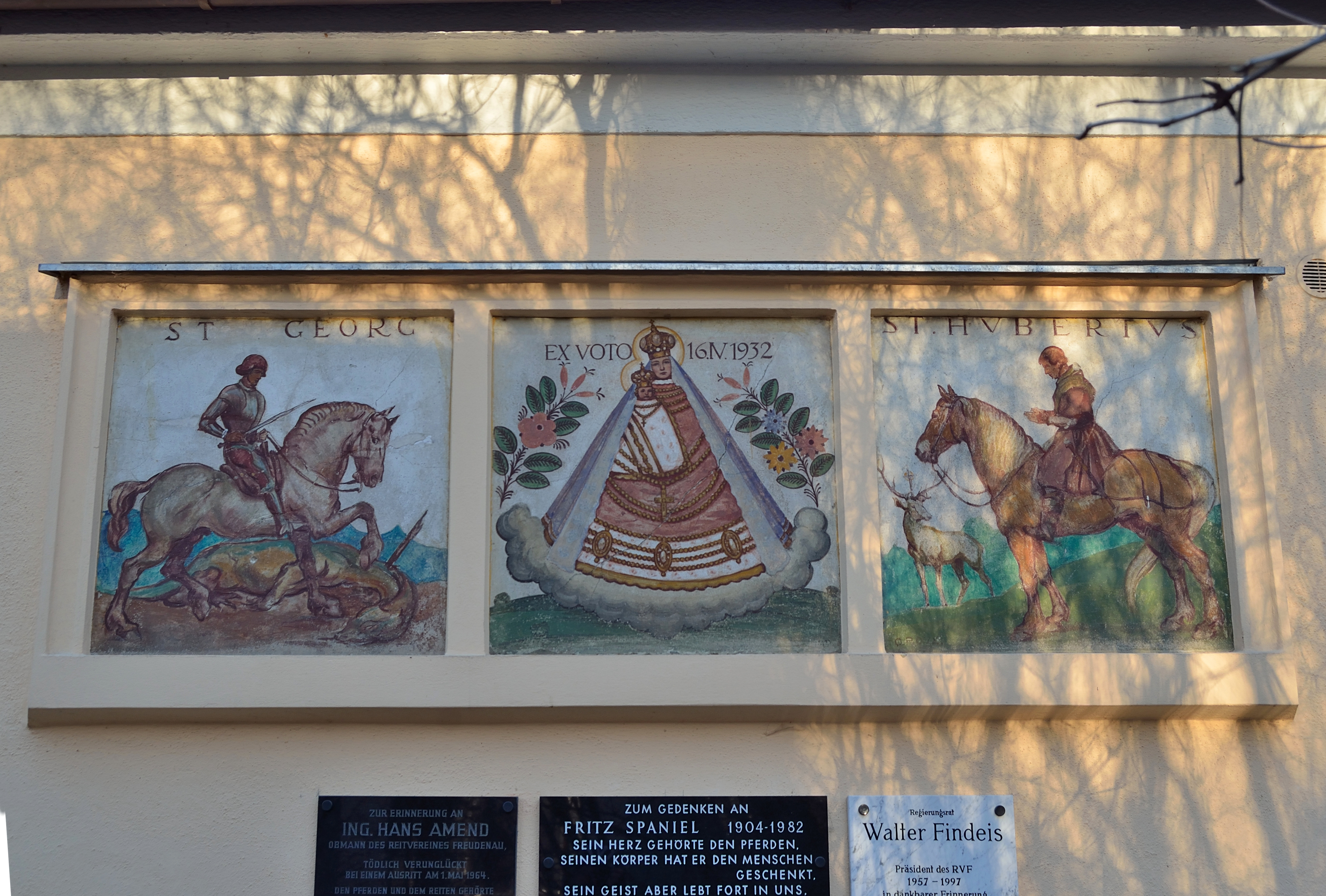
Votive murals at Wallfahrtskirche Maria Grün by Oswald Roux (1932), depicting (left to right) Saint George, the Virgin Mary, and Saint Hubertus.
