= Jac Maris =

Dutch sculptor

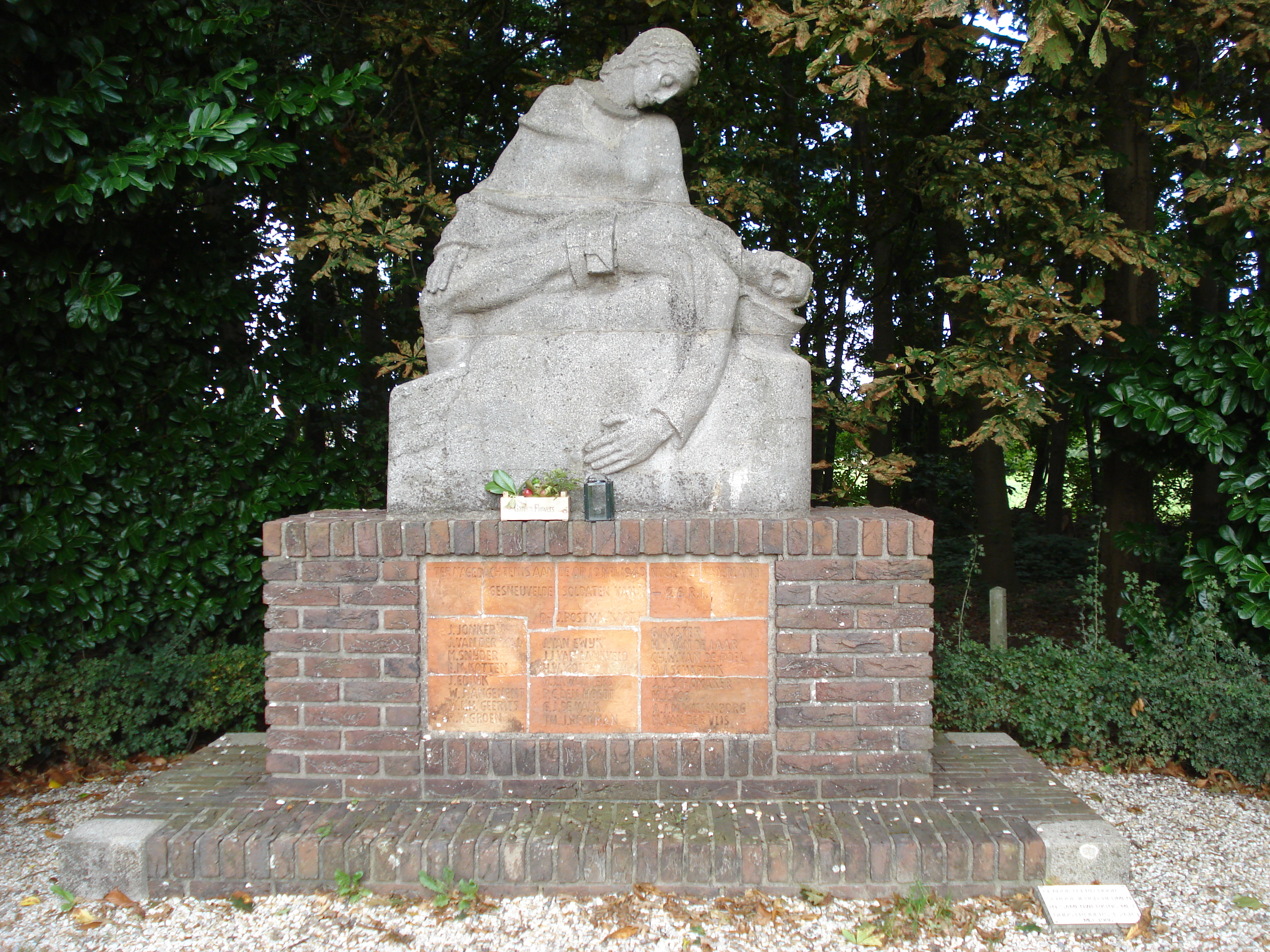
- War memorial
- Born: 21 February 1900; Magdeburg, Germany
- Died: 5 April 1996 (aged 96); Nijmegen, Netherlands
- Occupation: Sculptor

Jac Maris (21 February 1900 – 5 April 1996) was a Dutch sculptor. His work was part of the sculpture event in the art competition at the 1936 Summer Olympics.
