= Alois Houba =

Czech painter

- Born: 17 April 1904; Prague, Austria-Hungary
- Died: 9 November 1982 (aged 78)
- Occupations: architect, painter

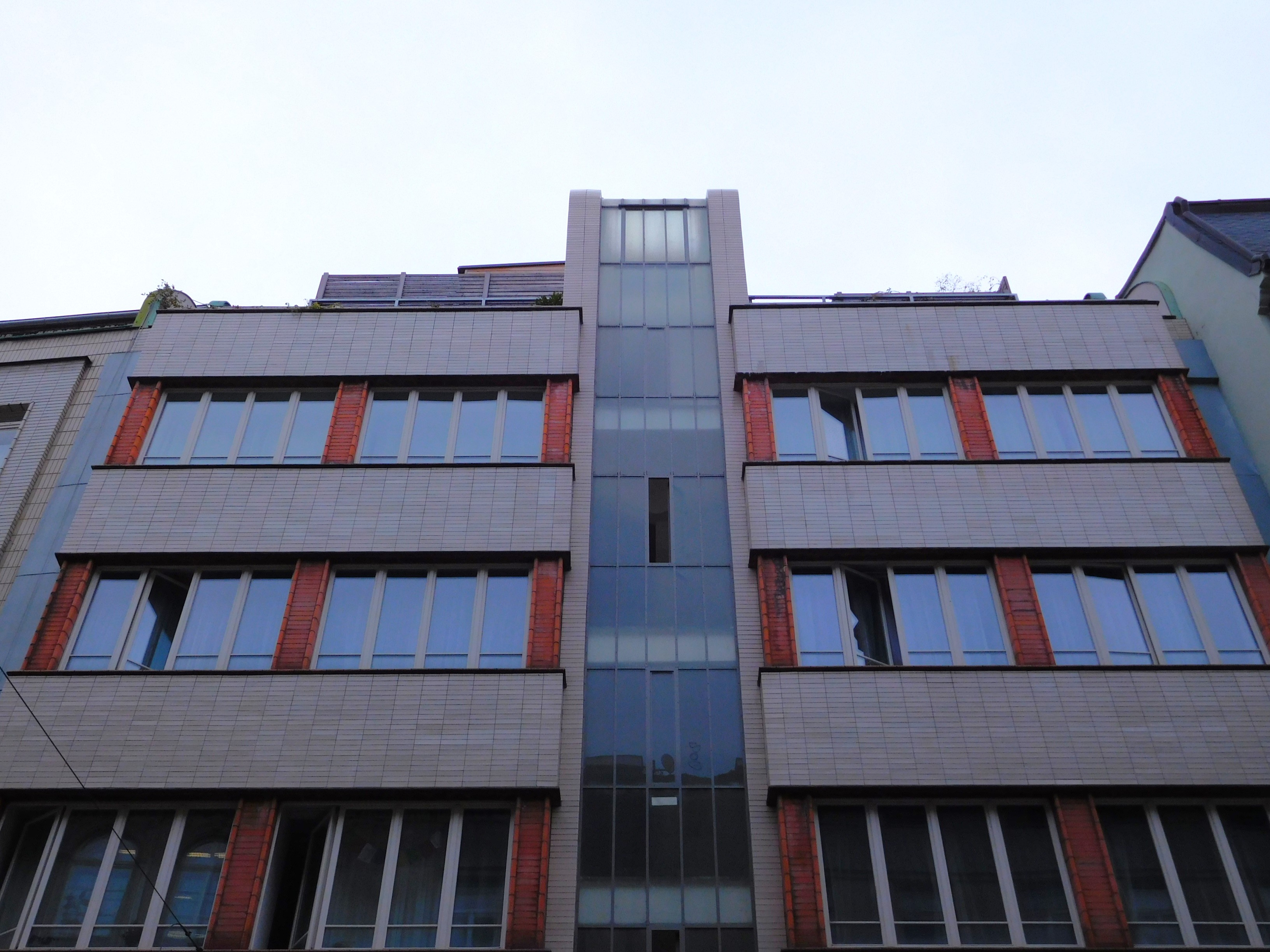
Functionalist tenement house in Prague, U půjčovny 6

Alois Houba (17 April 1904 – 9 November 1982) was a Czech architect and painter. His work was part of the painting event in the art competition at the 1936 Summer Olympics.
