= Takis Sakellariou =

Greek writer

- Born: 1908 (age 117–118)
- Occupation: Writer

Takis Sakellariou (Greek: Τάκης Σακελλαρίου, born 1908, date of death unknown) was a Greek writer, athlete, coach and physical education teacher. His work was part of the literature event in the art competition at the 1936 Summer Olympics. He is the author of Ή σωματική αγωγή της νεολαίας (The Physical Education of Youth) (1937).
