= Josef Kříž =

Czech architect

- Born: 4 February 1895; Prague, Austria-Hungary
- Died: 1988 (aged 92–93)
- Occupation: Architect

Josef Kříž (4 February 1895 – 1988) was a Czech architect. His work was part of the architecture event in the art competition at the 1936 Summer Olympics.
