= Alfonso Bortolotti =

Italian sculptor (1911–2005)

- Born: 22 November 1911; Bologna, Italy
- Died: 17 October 2005 (aged 93); Bologna, Italy
- Occupation: Sculptor

Alfonso Bortolotti (22 November 1911 – 17 October 2005) was an Italian sculptor. His work was part of the sculpture event in the art competition at the 1936 Summer Olympics.
