= Frans Lamberechts =

Belgian sculptor

- Born: 7 March 1909; Molenbeek-Saint-Jean, Belgium
- Died: 1988 (aged 78–79); Jette, Belgium
- Occupation: Sculptor

Frans Lamberechts (7 March 1909 – 1988) was a Belgian sculptor. His work was part of the sculpture event in the art competition at the 1936 Summer Olympics.
