= Franciszek Masiak =

Polish sculptor

- Born: 3 October 1906; Warsaw, Poland
- Died: 5 April 1983 (aged 76); Warsaw, Poland
- Occupation: Sculptor

Franciszek Masiak (3 October 1906 – 5 April 1983) was a Polish sculptor. His work was part of the art competitions at the 1932 Summer Olympics and the 1936 Summer Olympics.
