= Yoshioki Hasegawa =

Japanese sculptor (1892–1974)

- Born: 3 March 1892; Takaoka, Japan
- Died: 20 February 1974 (aged 81); Toshima, Japan
- Occupation: Sculptor

Yoshioki Hasegawa (3 March 1892 – 20 February 1974) was a Japanese sculptor. His work was part of the art competitions at the 1932 Summer Olympics and the 1936 Summer Olympics.
