= Georg Lagerstedt =

Swedish painter

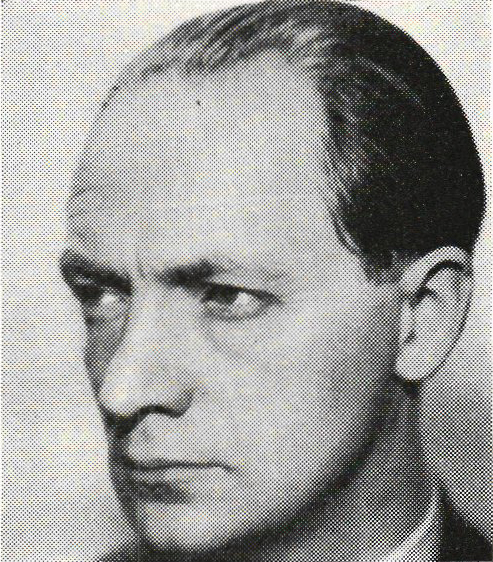
- Born: 23 September 1892; Agunnaryd, Sweden
- Died: 24 November 1982 (aged 90); Lidingö, Sweden
- Occupation: Painter

Georg Lagerstedt (23 September 1892 – 24 November 1982) was a Swedish painter. His work was part of the art competitions at the 1932 Summer Olympics and the 1936 Summer Olympics.
