= Johannes Albertus Boer =

Dutch architect

Jo Boer
- Born: Johannes Albertus Boer; 22 February 1895; Groningen, Netherlands
- Died: 12 February 1971 (aged 75); Groningen, Netherlands
- Occupation: Architect

Johannes "Jo" Albertus Boer (22 February 1895 – 12 February 1971) was a Dutch architect. His work was part of the architecture event in the art competition at the 1936 Summer Olympics.
