= Art competitions at the 1924 Summer Olympics =

Art competitions at the Games of the VIII Olympiad
- Art competitions pictogram
- Venue: Grand Palais des Champs-Elysées
- Dates: 4 May – 27 July 1924
- No. of events: 5

Art competitions were held as part of the 1924 Summer Olympics in Paris, France. Medals were awarded in five categories (architecture, literature, music, painting, and sculpture), for works inspired by sport-related themes.

Art competitions were part of the Olympic program from 1912 to 1948, but were discontinued due to concerns about amateurism and professionalism. Since 1952, a non-competitive art and cultural festival has been associated with each Games.

== Medal summary ==
Category	Gold	Silver	Bronze
Architecture	none awarded	Alfréd Hajós and Dezső Lauber (HUN); Plan for a stadium	Julien Médecin (MON); Stadium for Monte Carlo
Literature	Géo-Charles (FRA) "Jeux Olympiques"	Josef Petersen (DEN) "Euryale"	Charles Gonnet (FRA) "Vers le Dieu d'Olympie"
Literature	Géo-Charles (FRA) "Jeux Olympiques"	Margaret Stuart (GBR) "Sword Songs"	Oliver Gogarty (IRL) "Ode to the Tailteann Games"
Music	none awarded	none awarded	none awarded
Painting	Jean Jacoby (LUX) "Corner", "Départ", and "Rugby"	Jack Butler Yeats (IRL) "The Liffey Swim"	Johan van Hell (NED) "Patineurs"
Sculpture	Konstantinos Dimitriadis (GRE) "Discobole Finlandais"	Frantz Heldenstein (LUX) "Vers l'olympiade"	Jean René Gauguin (DEN); Boxer
Sculpture	Konstantinos Dimitriadis (GRE) "Discobole Finlandais"	Frantz Heldenstein (LUX) "Vers l'olympiade"	Claude-Léon Mascaux (FRA); Sports medals

== Medal table ==
At the time, medals were awarded to these artists, but art competitions are no longer regarded as official Olympic events by the International Olympic Committee. These events do not appear in the IOC medal database, and these totals are not included in the IOC's medal table for the 1924 Games.

Rank	Nation	Gold	Silver	Bronze	Total
1	Luxembourg (LUX)	1	1	0	2
2	France (FRA)	1	0	2	3
3	Greece (GRE)	1	0	0	1
4	Denmark (DEN)	0	1	1	2
4	Ireland (IRL)	0	1	1	2
6	Great Britain (GBR)	0	1	0	1
6	Hungary (HUN)	0	1	0	1
8	Monaco (MON)	0	0	1	1
8	Netherlands (NED)	0	0	1	1
Totals (9 entries)		3	5	6	14

== Events summary ==
=== Architecture ===
The following architects took part:

Rank	Name	Country
1	not awarded	
2	Alfréd Hajós, Dezső Lauber	Hungary
3	Julien Médécin	Monaco
AC	Sonja Carstensen	Denmark
AC	Dolf Broese van Groenou, Samuel de Clercq	Netherlands
AC	Henri Guerbois, Maurice Dambrun	France
AC	Oscar Gundlach-Pedersen	Denmark
AC	Jens Christian Kofoed	Denmark
AC	Nico Lansdorp	Netherlands
AC	Amedeo Lavini	Italy
AC	Ejnar Mindedal Rasmussen	Denmark
AC	Kay Schrøder	Denmark
AC	Herman van der Kloot Meijburg	Netherlands
AC	Edmond Virieux, Léo Rocco	Switzerland
AC	Marinus Granpré Molière, Jos Klijnen, Pieter Verhagen	Netherlands
AC	Hendrik Happé	Netherlands

=== Literature ===
The following writers took part:

Rank	Name	Country
1	Géo-Charles	France
2	Dorothy Margaret Stuart	Great Britain
2	Josef Petersen	Denmark
3	Charles Anthoine Gonnet	France
3	Oliver St. John Gogarty	Ireland
AC	Brinsley MacNamara	Ireland
AC	Miami Belle Louis	United States
AC	Patrick Chalmers	Great Britain
AC	Robert Graves	Great Britain
AC	Albert Laisant	France
AC	T. C. Murray	Ireland

Rank	Name	Country
AC	Smart	Switzerland
AC	Klaus Suomela	Finland
AC	A. Christory	France
AC	A. Godinat	France
AC	A. Schmitt	Switzerland
AC	Charles Williams	Great Britain
AC	France Darget Savarit	France
AC	Gonzague de Reynold	Switzerland
AC	Franz Servais	Luxembourg
AC	George Bamber	Great Britain
AC	H. Vincent	France

Rank	Name	Country
AC	Henry de Montherlant	France
AC	I. Couturier	United States
AC	Jacques Gazeau	France
AC	J. Ryan	Ireland
AC	L. Alvar da Silva	Brazil
AC	L. A. Fernández	Uruguay
AC	Lionel Montal	France
AC	Marcel Berger	France
AC	Peshoton Dubash	Great Britain
AC	Suzanne Ardoin	France

=== Music ===
The following composers took part:

Rank	Name	Country
1	not awarded	
2	not awarded	
3	not awarded	
AC	Gerry	France
AC	George Bamber	Great Britain
AC	Henry Masquilier Thiriez	France
AC	J. Richard	France
AC	Ruby Reynolds-Lewis	Australia
AC	Marius Ulfrstad	Norway
AC	Suzanne Daneau	Belgium
AC	Jaap Kool	Netherlands

=== Painting ===
The following painters took part:

Rank	Name	Country
1	Jean Jacoby	Luxembourg
2	Jack Yeats	Ireland
3	Johan van Hell	Netherlands
AC	Therese Elsen	Belgium
AC	Médard Tytgat	Belgium
AC	Johan Vilhelm Andersen	Denmark
AC	Christian Asmussen	Denmark
AC	Folmer Bonnén	Denmark
AC	Sigurd Kielland Brandt	Denmark
AC	Mogens Lorentzen	Denmark
AC	Aase Lundsteen	Denmark
AC	Knud Merrild	Denmark
AC	Sigurd Swane	Denmark
AC	Enayat Allah Ibrahim	Egypt
AC	Georges Achille-Fould	France
AC	R. G. P. Baron	France
AC	René Besserve	France
AC	Simone Boutarel	France
AC	Maurice Busset	France
AC	Marguerite Carpentier	France
AC	Géo Cim	France
AC	Madeleine Cotty	France

Rank	Name	Country
AC	Paul de Plument de Bailhac	France
AC	Léon Auguste Derruau	France
AC	Georges Rasetti	France
AC	R. M. A. Guimbert	France
AC	Jean Guinard	France
AC	Pauline Lacroix	France
AC	Louise Amélie Landré	France
AC	Jacques Henri Lartigue	France
AC	Paul Lorrette	France
AC	Yvonne Meley	France
AC	André Planson	France
AC	Henri Jean Pontoy	France
AC	René Roussel	France
AC	Hélène Schwab	France
AC	Lucien Seevagen	France
AC	Georges Villa	France
AC	Pierre Segond-Weber	France
AC	George Bamber	Great Britain
AC	Charles Simpson	Great Britain
AC	Seán Keating	Ireland
AC	John Lavery	Ireland
AC	Jack Yeats	Ireland

Rank	Name	Country
AC	Albert Simon	Luxembourg
AC	Bas Veth	Netherlands
AC	Jos Croin	Netherlands
AC	Freek Engel	Netherlands
AC	Ed Gerdes	Netherlands
AC	Isaac Israëls	Netherlands
AC	Martin Monnickendam	Netherlands
AC	Max Nauta	Netherlands
AC	Egbert Schaap	Netherlands
AC	Willy Sluiter	Netherlands
AC	Cornelis Vreedenburgh	Netherlands
AC	Piet van der Hem	Netherlands
AC	Willem van Hasselt	Netherlands
AC	Cornelis van Steenwijk	Netherlands
AC	Bernard van Vlijmen	Netherlands
AC	Hendrik Jan Wolter	Netherlands
AC	Aleksandr Yakovlev	Russia
AC	Mariya Princess Nizharadze	Russia
AC	Oscar Früh	Switzerland
AC	Albert Welti	Switzerland
AC	R. A. M. Guilmart	France

=== Sculpture ===
The following sculptors took part:

Rank	Name	Country
1	Konstantinos Dimitriadis	Greece
2	Frantz Heldenstein	Luxembourg
3	Claude-Léon Mascaux	France
3	Jean René Gauguin	Denmark
AC	Victor Demanet	Belgium
AC	Johannes Kragh	Denmark
AC	José Clará	Spain
AC	Lucien Alliot	France
AC	René Andrei	France
AC	Raoul Bénard	France
AC	Marcel Bouraine	France
AC	Eugène Bourgoin	France
AC	Marguerite Carpentier	France
AC	Félix Charpentier	France
AC	François Cogné	France
AC	Alfred Cros	France
AC	Albert David	France
AC	Louis Delapchier	France
AC	Joé Descomps-Cormier	France
AC	Édouard Drouot	France
AC	Georges Engrand	France
AC	Édouard Fraisse	France
AC	Berthe Girardet	France

Rank	Name	Country
AC	Henri Gréber	France
AC	Maurice Guiraud-Rivière	France
AC	Georges Halbout	France
AC	Elie Hervier, Pierre-Amédée Plasait	France
AC	Raoul Lamourdedieu, Camille Ravot	France
AC	Pierre Richard-Willm	France
AC	Marie Rosenfeld	France
AC	Henri Raphaël Moncassin	France
AC	Raoul Josset	France
AC	Raymond Rivoire	France
AC	Paul Landowski	France
AC	Ernesta Robert-Mérignac	France
AC	Paul Richer	France
AC	Alexandre Maspoli	France
AC	Louis Tauzin	France
AC	Lucien Marinier	France
AC	Jean Verschneider	France
AC	Francisque Michot	France
AC	Camille Ravot	France
AC	Katherine Maltwood	Great Britain
AC	Oliver Sheppard	Ireland
AC	Antonietta Paoli Pogliani	Italy
AC	Vincenzo Gemito	Italy

Rank	Name	Country
AC	Amleto Cataldi	Italy
AC	Anders Svor	Norway
AC	Sofus Madsen	Norway
AC	Fanie Eloff	South Africa
AC	Constant Vez	Switzerland
AC	Oscar Waldmann	Switzerland
AC	Georg Eichhorn	Switzerland
AC	Hans Frei	Switzerland
AC	Marguerite Anne de Blonay	Switzerland
AC	Julius Schwyzer	Switzerland
AC	Frédéric Schmied	Switzerland
AC	Jean Dušek	Czechoslovakia
AC	Jakub Obrovský	Czechoslovakia
AC	Sergey Yuryevich	Russia
AC	Ivan Zajec	Yugoslavia
AC	F. Kroly	Yugoslavia
AC	Frane Cota	Yugoslavia
AC	Henri Bouchard	France
AC	Paul Roger-Bloche	France
AC	Juraj Škarpa	Yugoslavia
AC	Henri Dropsy	France

== Sources ==
- Avé, M. (ed.). Les Jeux de la VIII^{e} Olympiade Paris 1924 - Rapport Officiel (PDF) (in French). Paris: Comité Olympique Français. pp. 601–612. Archived (PDF) from the original on 10 April 2008.
- Wagner, Juergen. "Olympic Art Competition 1924 Paris". Olympic Games Museum. Archived from the original on 1 May 2008.
- Kramer, Bernhard (May 2004). "In Search of the Lost Champions of the Olympic Art Contests" (PDF). Journal of Olympic History. 12 (2): 29–34. Archived (PDF) from the original on 10 April 2008.
