= Happe =

Happe or Happé is a German surname. Notable people with the surname include:

- Alain Happe, French football director
- Dan Happe (born 1998), English footballer
- Francesca Happé (born 1967), British neuroscientist
- Heinrich Happe (1894–1979), German politician
- Hendrik Happé (1884–1962), Dutch architect
- Markus Happe (born 1972), German footballer
- Thomas Happe (born 1958), West German handball player
- Ursula Happe (1926–2021), German swimmer
