= Lavini =

Lavini is a surname, and can refer to:

- Members of the Lavini family of Italy, including:
- Giuseppe Lavini (1721-1793), Italian literature scholar
- Giuseppe Lavini senior (1776-1847), professor of chemistry and pharmacy at the University of Turin, son of Carlo Amedeo
  - Amedeo Giuseppe Teresio Lavini (1820-1884), Italian magistrate, son of Giuseppe senior
    - Giuseppe Lavini (1857–1928), Italian painter and art critic, son of Amedeo Giuseppe Teresio
      - Amedeo Lavini (1894–1961), Italian Architect, only son of Giuseppe
      - Celestina Lavini (1896–1977), 1st daughter of Giuseppe
      - Adelina Lavini (1901–1990), 2nd daughter of Giuseppe, in 1921 married Riccardo Ajmone-Marsan
