= New Hague School =

The New Hague School may refer to:

- New Hague School (visual arts), a movement in the fine arts 1950s and 1960s
- New Hague School (architecture), a Dutch architectural style dating from the period between the two World Wars, but first used in 1920
