= Laisant =

Laisant is a surname. Notable people with the surname include:

- Albert Laisant, French writer
- Charles-Ange Laisant (1841–1920), French politician and mathematician
- Maurice Laisant (1909–1991), French militant anarchist individualist, free thinker, and pacifist

== See also ==
- Laisant's Recurrence Formula
