= Moncassin (surname) =

Moncassin is a surname of French origin. Notable people with that name include:

- Cathy Moncassin (born/ 1977). French/ cyclist
- Frédéric Moncassin (born 1968), French cyclist
- Henri Raphaël Moncassin (1883-1958), French sculptor

== See also ==
- Leyritz-Moncassin, a commune in the Lot-et-Garonne department in south-western France
- Moncassin, a commune in the Gers department in southwestern France
