= Michot =

Michot is a surname primarily used in French-speaking areas. Notable people with the surname include:

- Francisque Michot (1891–1968), French sculptor
- Yahya Michot (1952–2025), Belgian Islamologist and author
