= Dubash (surname) =

Dubash is a surname. Notable people with the surname include:

- Navroz Dubash, Indian academic
- Peshoton Dubash (1891–?), British writer
- Tanya Dubash (born 1968), Indian businesswoman
