= Patrick Chalmers =

Patrick Chalmers is the name of:

- Patrick Chalmers (MP) (1802–1854), Member of Parliament for Montrose Burghs
- Patrick R. Chalmers (1872–1942), Irish writer
