= Daneau =

Daneau is a surname. Notable people with the surname include:

- Charlotte Daneau de Muy (1694–1759), Canadian ursuline and annalist
- Lambert Daneau (1530–1590), French jurist and Calvinist theologian
- Normand Daneau, Canadian actor and screenwriter
- Suzanne Daneau (1901–1971), Belgian pianist and composer
