= Klijnen =

Klijnen is a Dutch family name. Notable people with the surname include:

- Jos Klijnen, Dutch architect
- Mariëtte Frijters-Klijnen (born 1953), Dutch politician
