= Lansdorp =

Landsdorp is a surname. Notable people with the surname include:

- Bas Lansdorp (born 1977), Dutch entrepreneur
- Nico Lansdorp (1885–1968), Dutch architect
- Peter M. Lansdorp (born 1952), Canadian cancer researcher
- Robert Lansdorp (1938–2024), American tennis coach
