= Harscamp villa =

Villa in Baarn, the Netherlands

Coordinates: 52°12′56.45″N 5°16′31.56″E

Harscamp
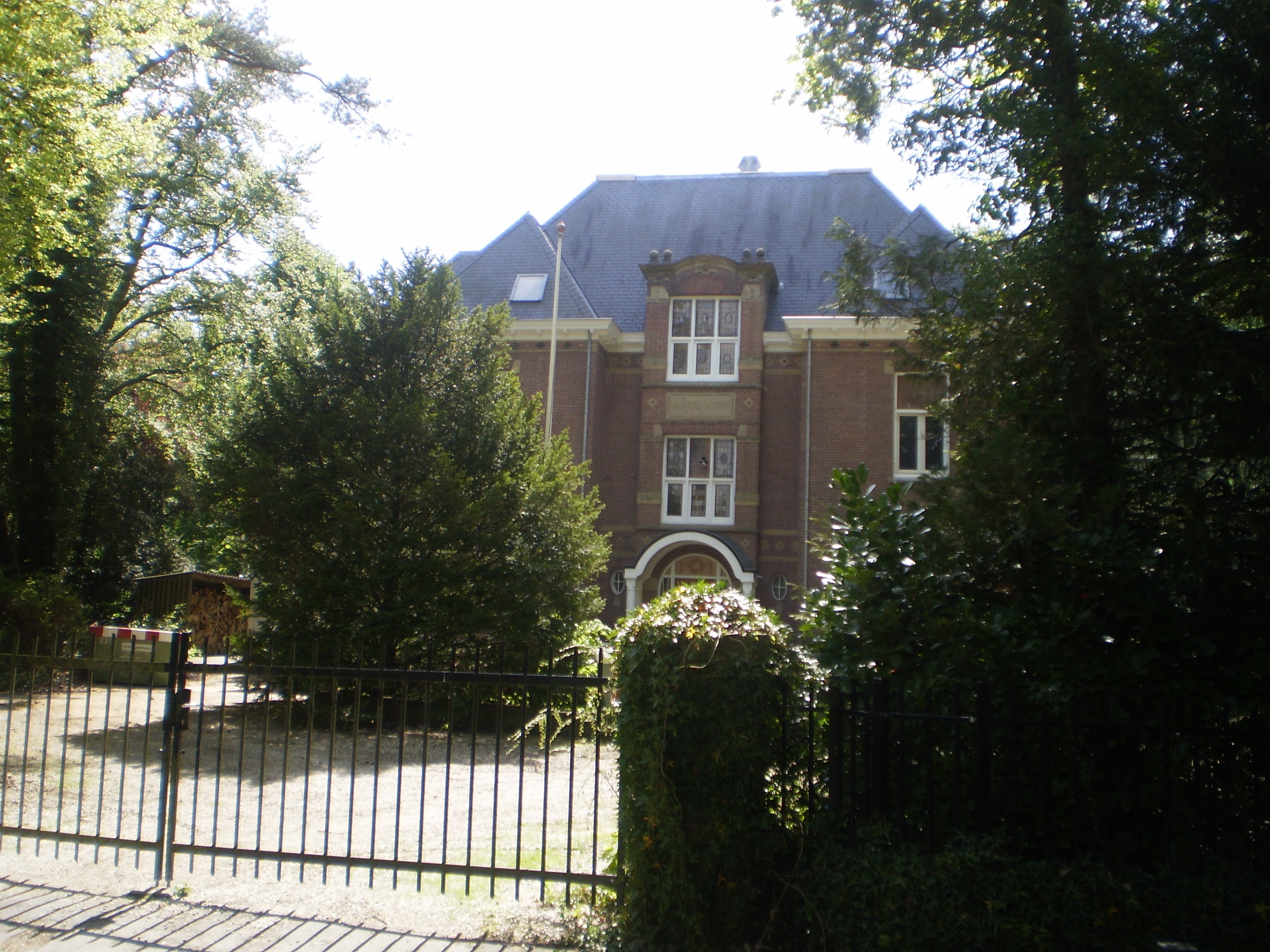
- Harscamp (2013)
- Interactive map of the Harscamp area

General information
- Type: villa
- Classification: Provincial monument, 0308/wikinr221
- Location: Ringlaan 2, Baarn
- Completed: 1912
- Owner: Salvation Army

Design and construction
- Architect: Samuel de Clercq

The Harscamp villa is a municipal monument on the Ringlaan in the Dutch town of Baarn in de province Utrecht. The villa is in the Wilhelminapark, a villa neighborhood which is part of a Rijksmonument.

The house was built in 1912 by shipping magnate L.P.D. Op ten Noort, co-founder of the Koninklijke Paketvaart Maatschappij. The slate-covered roof has a lantern on top, with a sailing vessel for a weather vane. The building's stained glass windows have sailing as a common motif.

The symmetric front facade has a central porch with a curved roof. It had structures added on either side; a loggia on the right, and a sunroom on the left. Behind the building was a geometric garden.

Since 1938 the Harscamp is owned by the Salvation Army; for a long time it was in use as a children's home. In 2000, the building was renovated to become a home for unhoused people. A report from the town of Baarn from 2015 noted that the building had served drug addicts but had recently been closed; preparations were underway to make it an assisted living facility.
