= Simone Boutarel =

French sculptor and medal engraver

- Born: 5 March 1892; Paris, France
- Died: 21 August 1987 (aged 95); Nyons, France
- Occupation: Sculptor

Simone Marie Suzanne Boutarel (5 March 1892 – 21 August 1987) was a French sculptor and medallist. She was principally known for her small-scale works representing animals and birds.

Boutarel was a descendant of the Breton writer Émile Souvestre and his wife Nanine Papot, and the granddaughter of the writer Eugène Lesbazeilles. She was a pupil of Paul Landowski and Édouard Fraisse and a member of the Société des artistes français. In 1928 she exhibited at the Salon des Indépendants a bust and a display case of little sculptures She was awarded a bronze medal at the Paris Salon in 1929, and silver medals at the Salons of 1931 and 1937, and continued to exhibit works until the end of the 1960s.

A rare public work on a larger scale was the bronze ornaments on the doors of the market hall of Falaise in Normandy, restored in 2022.

Although a sculptor and medallist, she submitted work for the painting event in the art competition at the 1924 Summer Olympics.
