= Segond =

Segond may refer to:

== People ==
- Louis Segond
- Guy-Olivier Segond
- Paul Segond
- Pierre Segond-Weber

== Other uses ==
- Segond fracture
- Segond Channel
- French cruiser Segond
