= Maurice Guiraud-Rivière =

French sculptor

- Born: 10 February 1881; Toulouse, France
- Died: 1947 (aged 65–66)
- Occupation: Sculptor

Maurice Guiraud-Rivière (10 February 1881 – 1947) was a French sculptor. His work was part of the sculpture event in the art competition at the 1924 Summer Olympics.
