= Édouard Drouot =

French sculptor

- Born: 3 April 1859; Sommevoire, France
- Died: 22 May 1945 (aged 86); Paris, France
- Occupation: Sculptor

Édouard Drouot (English: /druːˈoʊ/ droo-OH, French: [edwaʁ dʁuo]; 3 April 1859 – 22 May 1945) was a French sculptor. His work was part of the sculpture event in the art competition at the 1924 Summer Olympics.

== Biography ==
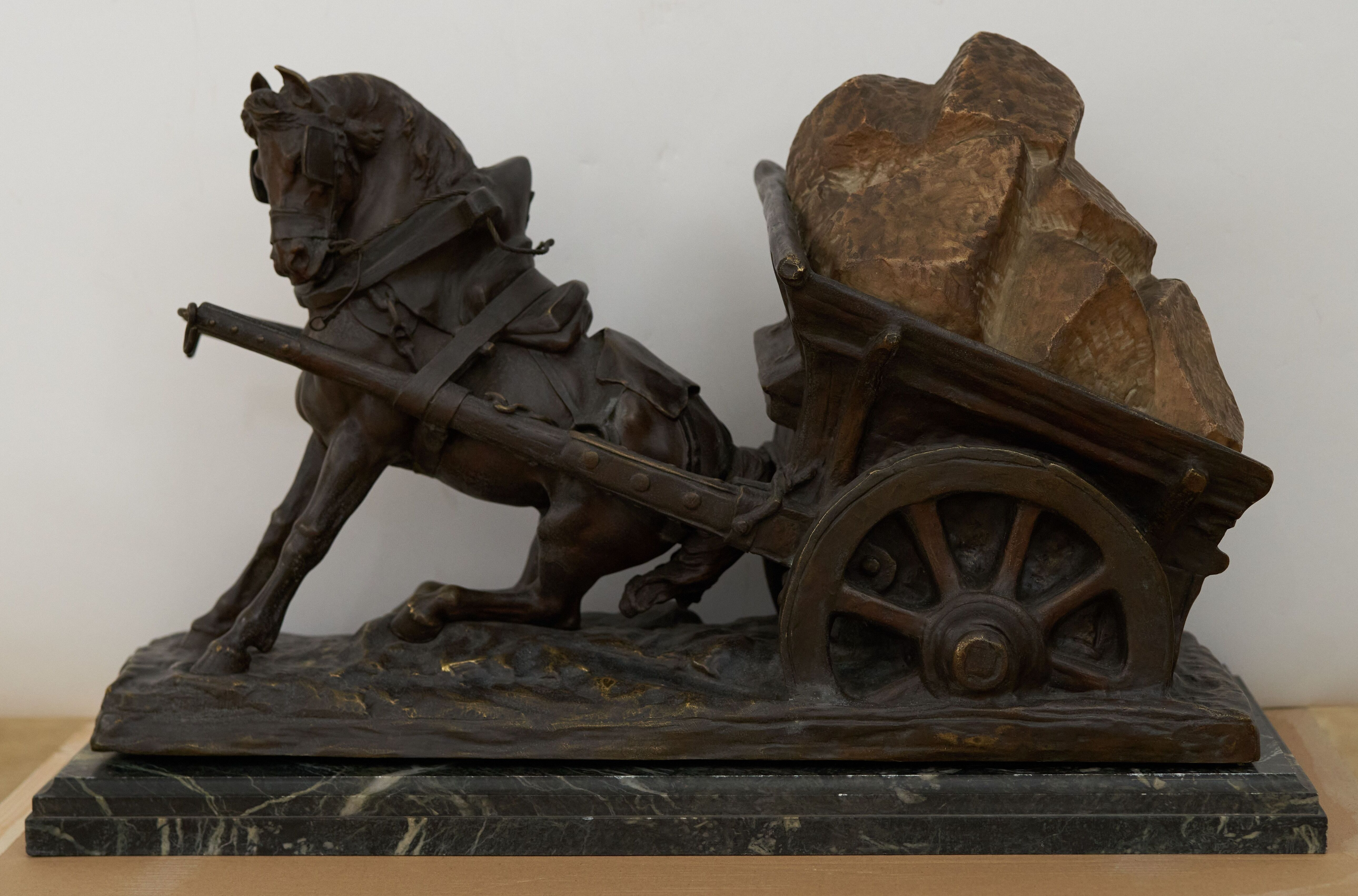
Sculpture by Edouard Drouot: workhorse

Student of Émile Thomas and Mathurin Moreau at the Beaux-Arts de Paris, member of the Salon des artistes français, Édouard Drouot presented a plaster group there in 1929, Le Crépuscule and obtained an honorable mention in 1889 and a 3rd grade medal class in 1892. He was also awarded an honorable mention at the 1900 Universal Exhibition.

He is known for his bronze and marble sculptures of allegorical and mythological scenes that are characterized by a sense of movement and expressive touch.
