= Paul Lorrette =

French painter

- Born: 30 December 1886; Langres, France
- Died: 5 June 1971 (aged 84); Neuvy-Pailloux, France
- Occupation: Painter

Paul Lorrette (30 December 1886 – 5 June 1971) was a French painter. His work was part of the painting event in the art competition at the 1924 Summer Olympics.
