= Georges Engrand =

French sculptor

- Born: 5 October 1852; Aire-sur-la-Lys, France
- Died: February 1936
- Occupation: Sculptor

Georges Engrand (5 October 1852 – February 1936) was a French sculptor. His work was part of the sculpture event in the art competition at the 1924 Summer Olympics.
