= Aase Lundsteen =

Danish painter

- Born: 15 July 1903; Søllerød, Denmark
- Died: 8 May 1984 (aged 80); Hedehusene, Denmark
- Occupation: Painter

Aase Lundsteen (15 July 1903 – 8 May 1984) was a Danish painter. Her work was part of the painting event in the art competition at the 1924 Summer Olympics.
