= Mogens Lorentzen =

Danish painter and writer

- Born: 4 April 1892; Copenhagen, Denmark
- Died: 7 February 1953 (aged 60); Copenhagen, Denmark
- Occupations: painter, writer, radio broadcaster

Mogens Lorentzen (4 April 1892 – 7 February 1953) was a Danish writer, painter and illustrator, born in Copenhagen. He travelled in Europe to study painting, and also trained under Holger Grønvold and Peter Rostrup Bøyesen. He enjoyed a varied career of painting, illustrating and writing, specialising in short prose pieces, poems and lyrics. He is particularly remembered in Denmark as the author of the 1939 Christmas carol Juletræet med sin pynt ("The Christmas tree with its decoration"), to music by Egil Harder. He was also a popular radio broadcaster in the 1930s and 1940s, and several collections of his broadcasts were published, as were his collected poems towards the end of his life as Dage og Nætter.

He submitted an entry for the painting event in the art competition at the 1924 Summer Olympics.

Lorentzen died in Copenhagen on 7 February 1953 and is buried in the Holmen Cemetery.
