= Jos Croin =

Dutch painter (1894–1949)

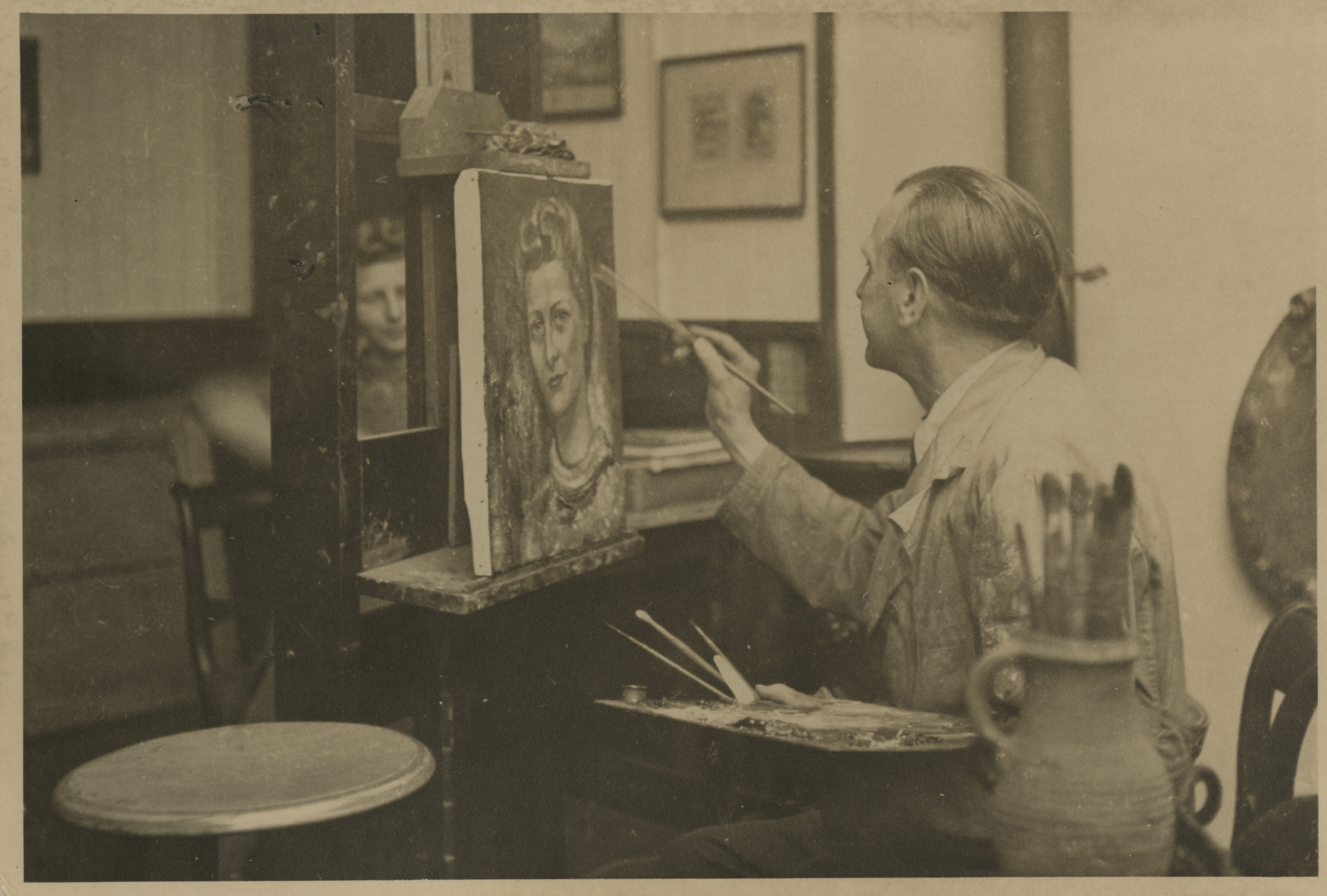
- Croin circa 1949
- Born: 15 March 1894; Middelburg, Netherlands
- Died: 24 November 1949 (aged 55); Amsterdam, Netherlands
- Occupation: Painter

Jos Croin (March 15, 1894 – November 24, 1949) was a Dutch painter. His work was part of the painting event in the art competition at the 1924 Summer Olympics. Croin's work was included in the 1939 exhibition and sale Onze Kunst van Heden (Our Art of Today) at the Rijksmuseum in Amsterdam.
