= Sigurd Kielland Brandt =

Danish painter

- Born: 19 May 1886; Væggerløse, Denmark
- Died: 21 May 1964 (aged 78); Copenhagen, Denmark
- Occupation: Painter

Sigurd Kielland Brandt (19 May 1886 – 21 May 1964) was a Danish painter. His work was part of the painting event in the art competition at the 1924 Summer Olympics.
