= Jean Guinard =

French painter

- Born: 18 October 1899; Paimpol, France
- Died: 23 October 1992 (aged 93); Clichy, France
- Occupation: Painter

Jean Guinard (18 October 1899 – 23 October 1992) was a French painter. His work was part of the painting event in the art competition at the 1924 Summer Olympics.
