= René Roussel =

French painter

- Born: 27 July 1885; Mée, France
- Died: 10 January 1962 (aged 76); Issoudun, France
- Occupation: Painter

René Roussel (27 July 1885 – 10 January 1962) was a French painter. His work was part of the painting event in the art competition at the 1924 Summer Olympics.
