= Albert David (sculptor) =

French sculptor

- Born: 30 November 1896; Liernais, France
- Died: 14 December 1970 (aged 74); Nice, France
- Occupation: Sculptor

Albert David (30 November 1896 – 14 December 1970) was a French sculptor. His work was part of the sculpture event in the art competition at the 1924 Summer Olympics.
