= Edmond Virieux =

Swiss architect

- Born: 24 December 1893; Geneva, Switzerland
- Died: 10 September 1969 (aged 75); Sierre, Switzerland
- Occupation: Architect

Edmond Virieux (24 December 1893 – 10 September 1969) was a Swiss architect. His work was part of the architecture event in the art competition at the 1924 Summer Olympics.
