= Camille Ravot =

French sculptor

- Born: 20 December 1873; Villenauxe-la-Grande, France
- Died: 3 July 1945 (aged 71)
- Occupation: Sculptor

Camille Ravot (French: [kamij ʁavo]; 20 December 1873 – 3 July 1945) was a French sculptor. His work was part of the sculpture event in the art competition at the 1924 Summer Olympics.
