= Cornelis Vreedenburgh =

Dutch painter

- Born: 25 August 1880; Woerden, Netherlands
- Died: 27 June 1946 (aged 65); Laren, Netherlands
- Occupation: Painter

Cornelis Vreedenburgh (25 August 1880 – 27 June 1946) was a Dutch painter. His work was part of the painting event in the art competition at the 1924 Summer Olympics. Vreedenburgh's work was included in the 1939 exhibition and sale Onze Kunst van Heden (Our Art of Today) at the Rijksmuseum in Amsterdam.

== Gallery ==
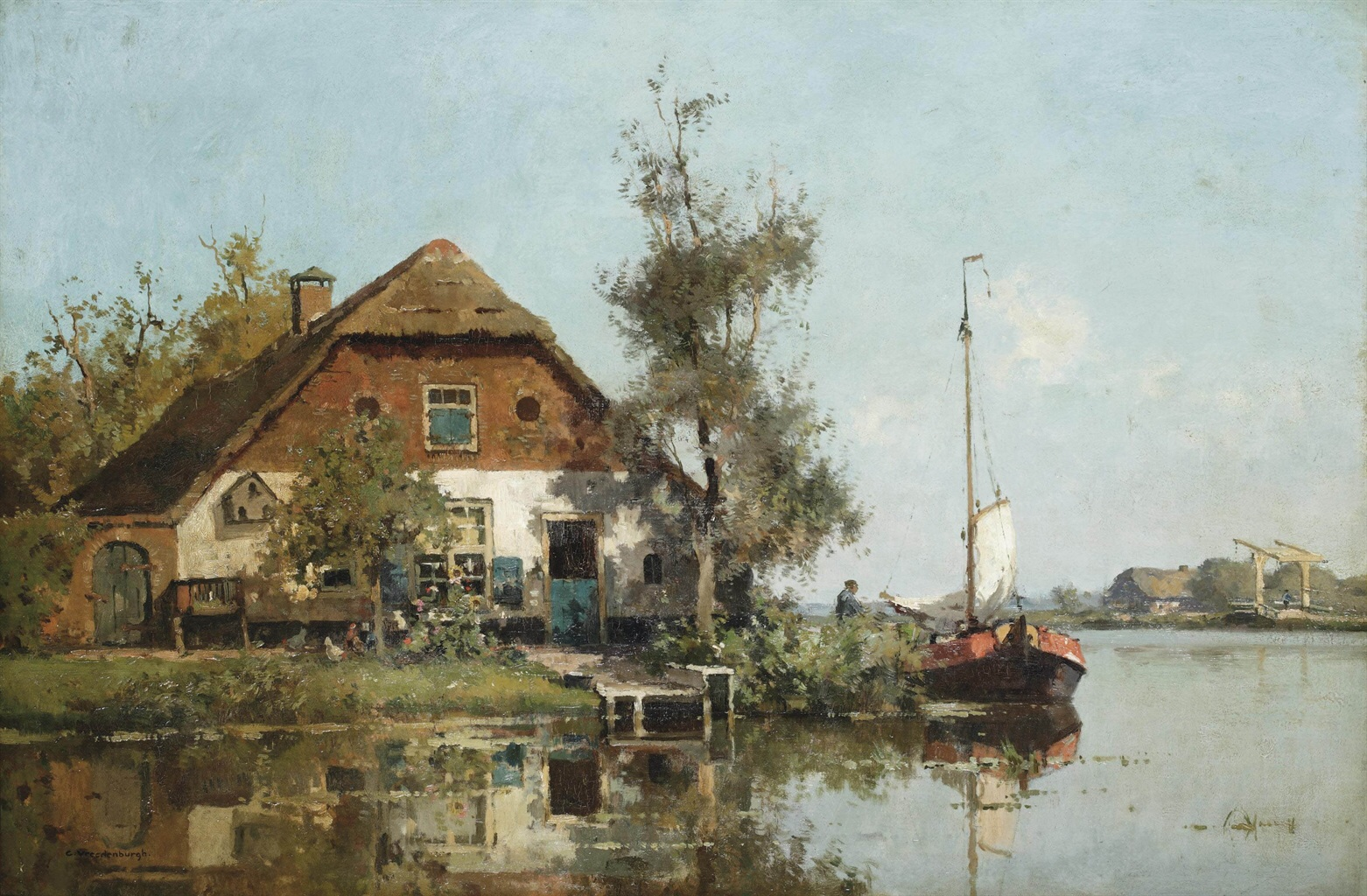
Aangemeerde zeilboot

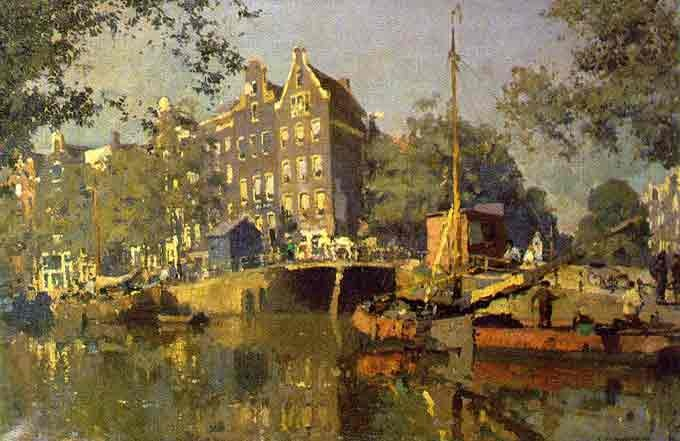
Prinsengracht
