= Lucien Alliot =

French sculptor

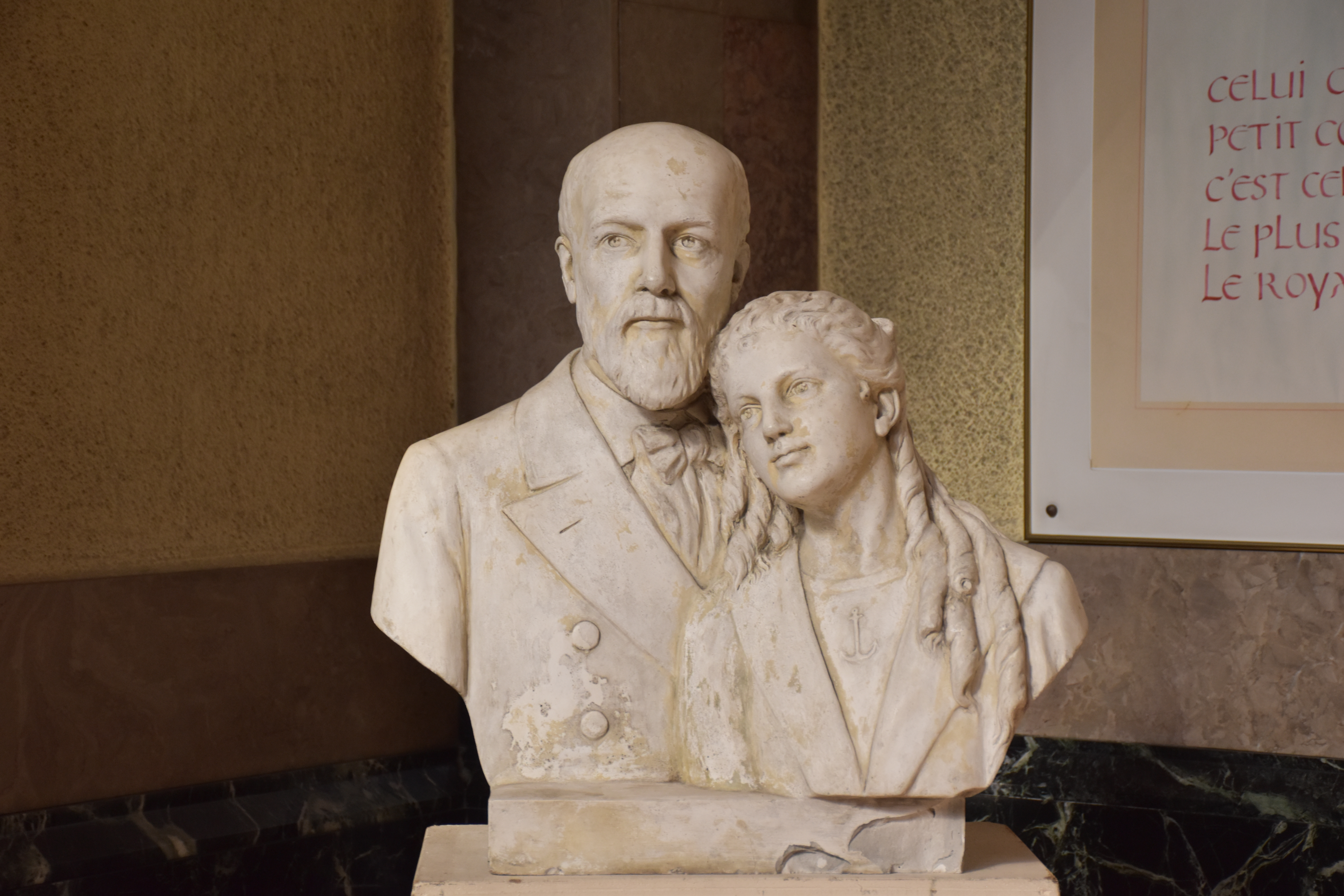
- Lucien Alliot, Double portrait. Signed, L. ALLIOT. Lisieux, la Basilique Sainte-Thérèse de Lisieux.
- Born: 17 November 1877; Paris, France
- Died: 9 March 1967 (aged 89); Nanteuil-lès-Meaux, France
- Occupation: Sculptor

Lucien Alliot (French: [lysjɛ̃ aljo]; 17 November 1877 – 9 March 1967) was a French sculptor. His work was part of the sculpture event in the art competition at the 1924 Summer Olympics.
