= Maria Vega =

Russian poet, artist and translator

- Born: Mariya Nikolayevna Volyntseva; 15 June 1898; Saint Petersburg, Russian Empire
- Died: 27 January 1980 (aged 81); Leningrad, Soviet Union
- Other names: Mariya Princess Nizharadze
- Education: Pavlovsk Women's Institute
- Occupations: poet, artist and translator
- Known for: Competing in the Art competitions at the 1924 Summer Olympics
- Spouse: Mikhail Lang
- Father: Nikolai Nikolaevich Volyntsev

Mariya Nikolayevna Volyntseva (married name Lang, 15 June 1898 – 27 January 1980), better known by her pseudonyms Maria Vega and Mariya Princess Nizharadze, was a Russian poet, artist and translator.

== Biography ==
Vega was born in Saint Petersburg in the Russian Empire, and was from a noble Georgian family. Her father was Nikolai Nikolaevich Volyntsev, a former Second Lieutenant and inventor of weapons. Her godmother was the Russian dramatic actress Maria Savina. Vega was educated at the Pavlovsk Women's Institute in Saint Petersburg.

Vega was forced to leave her homeland after the Russian Revolution and moved to France. In France, she married naval officer Mikhail Lang.

In France, Vega composed poems and wrote for the Russian émigré press. She translated the works of Austrian poet Rainer Maria Rilke, later working on a biography of him. Vega also painted and made dolls to make money.

Vega competed in the Art competitions at the 1924 Summer Olympics in Paris, submitting a work called Tennis Macabre to the mixed painting event under the name Mariya Princess Nizharadze.

In 1935 Vega's first book, a collection of poems titled Wormwood, was published in Paris. She published several other poetry collections, such as Major in Minor (1938) and Lilith (1955).

In 1946, Vega was given a Soviet passport. By the 1960s, she held a Swiss residence permit and lived in Bern, Switzerland. She distanced herself from Russian émigré circles and began to write for publications of the USSR's Committee for Relations with Compatriots Abroad including the newspaper Voice of the Motherland, magazine Rodina and the collections In Foreign Lands and Facing the Motherland.

Vega returned to Leningrad, Soviet Union, in 1975. She settled in the House of Stage Veterans, which had been founded by her godmother. She died in 1980.
