= Oscar Früh =

Swiss painter

- Born: 25 May 1891; Freienstein-Teufen, Switzerland
- Died: 11 October 1949 (aged 58); Paris, France
- Occupation: Painter

Oscar Früh (25 May 1891 – 11 October 1949) was a Swiss painter. His work was part of the painting event in the art competition at the 1924 Summer Olympics.
