= Dorothy Margaret Stuart =

English poet and writer (1889–1963)

Olympic medal record

Art competitions
Silver medal – second place	1924 Paris	Literature

Dorothy Margaret Stuart, née Browne (1889, Meerbrook, Staffordshire – 14 September 1963), was a British poet and writer.

In 1924 she won a silver medal in the art competitions of the Olympic Games for her "Fencers' song" cycle, Sword Songs.

Her other works include literary and historical biographies, historical non-fiction particularly concentrating on the lives of women and children, and history stories for children. She was a member of the English Association from 1930 onwards, edited its News-Letter and contributed essays and book reviews to its journal, English.

== Selected bibliography ==
Magyar Poems (translated by Nora de Vállyi and Dorothy M. Stuart, foreword by Ármin Vámbéry)

- Lyrics of Old London (1915)
- Sword Songs (1925)
- The Boy Through the Ages (1926)
- The Book of Other Lands (1926)
- Horace Walpole (1927)
- The Girl Through the Ages (1933)
- Chivalry and Social Life in the Middle Ages (1927)
- Christina Rossetti (1930)
- Men and Women of Plantagenet England (1932)
- The Book of Chivalry and Romance (1933)
- Sir Walter Scott: Some Centenary Reflections (1934)
- The King's Service (1935)
- Molly Lepell: Lady Hervey (1936)
- King George the Sixth (1937)
- The Daughters of George III (1939)
- A Child's Day Through the Ages (1941)
- The Mother of Victoria: A Period Piece (1942)
- The Children's Chronicle (1944)
- Historic Cavalcade (1945)
- The English Abigail (1946)
- The Young Clavengers (1947)
- The Five Wishes (1950)
- Daughter of England: A New Study of Princess Charlotte of Wales and Her Family (1951)
- The Story of William the Conqueror (1952)
- Portrait of the Prince Regent (1953)
- Dearest Bess (1955)
- London Through the Ages (1956)
- A Book of Cats: Legendary, Literary and Historical (1959)
