= Claude-Léon Mascaux =

French sculptor

Olympic medal record

Art competitions
Bronze medal – third place	1924 Paris	Sculpture

Claude-Léon Mascaux (June 13, 1882 – March 8, 1965) was a French sculptor, and medallist. He won a bronze medal in the art competitions at the 1924 Summer Olympics for creating seven sports medals.
