= Georges Pilley =

French painter

- Born: 16 October 1885; Saint-Germain, Haute-Saône, France
- Died: 3 February 1974 (aged 88)
- Occupation: Painter

Georges Pilley (16 October 1885 – 3 February 1974) was a French painter. Under the name of Géo Cim, his work was part of the painting event in the art competition at the 1924 Summer Olympics.
