= Oscar Waldmann =

Swiss sculptor

- Born: 25 June 1856; Geneva, Switzerland
- Died: 15 March 1937 (aged 80); Paris, France
- Occupation: Sculptor

Oscar Waldmann (25 June 1856 – 15 March 1937) was a Swiss sculptor. His work was part of the sculpture event in the art competition at the 1924 Summer Olympics.
