= New Hague School (architecture) =

Dutch architectural style

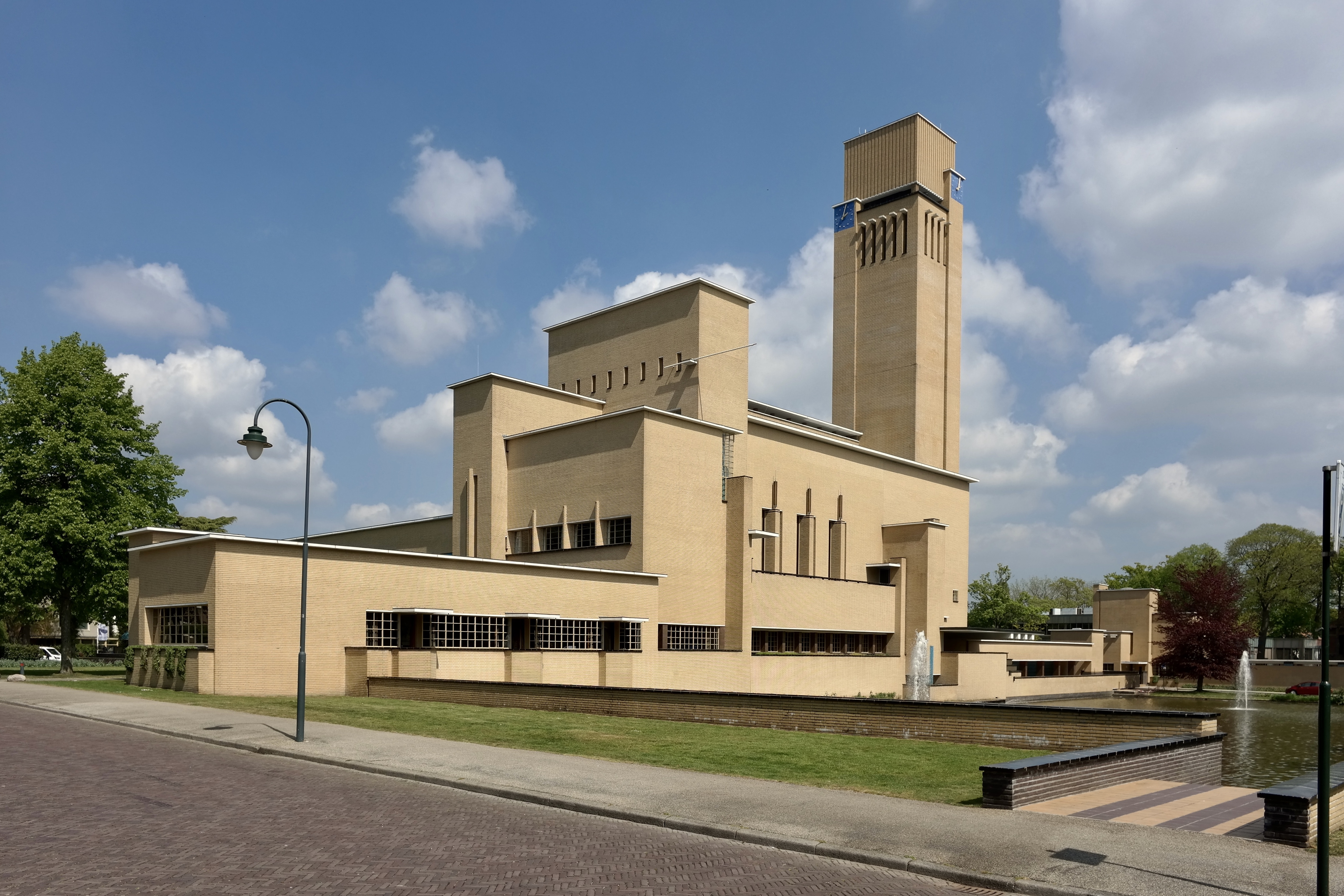
The Hilversum Town Hall by Willem Marinus Dudok is considered as the finest example of the New Hague School architecture.

The New Hague School (Dutch: Nieuwe Haagse School) was a Dutch architectural style in the interwar period characterised by its straight lines, its cubist shapes and its use of brick. It shared its asymmetrical, cubist compositions with De Stijl, but was more traditional in its use of brick and roof tiles, like the Amsterdam School. The term was first used in 1920, by the Amsterdam School architect C. J. Blaauw. He mentions the style in connection to architects like Dirk Roosenburg, Herman van der Kloot Meijburg and Jan Wils. Hendrik Wouda can also be considered a part of the school.

== See also ==
- New Hague School (visual arts)
