= Hélène Schwab =

French painter

- Born: 22 November 1878; Baume-les-Messieurs, France
- Died: 20 December 1954 (aged 76)
- Occupation: Painter

Hélène Schwab (22 November 1878 – 20 December 1954) was a French painter. Her work was part of the painting event in the art competition at the 1924 Summer Olympics.
