= Joé Descomps-Cormier =

French sculptor (1869–1950)

- Born: 18 January 1869; Clermont-Ferrand, France
- Died: 24 April 1950 (aged 81); Paris, France
- Occupation: Sculptor

Joé Descomps-Cormier (18 January 1869 – 24 April 1950) was a French sculptor. His work was part of the sculpture event in the art competition at the 1924 Summer Olympics.
