= Frédéric Schmied =

Swiss sculptor (1893–1972)

Frédéric Schmied (26 July 1893 – 23 September 1972) was a Swiss sculptor. He attended the Ecole des Beaux-Arts in Geneva (1916–1921). Schmied's work was exhibited at the Musée Rath in October 1931. His work was also part of the sculpture event in the art competition at the 1924 Summer Olympics.

== Works ==
- Aigle de Genève and Colombe de la Paix: two equestrian sculptures at Quai Turrettini, Geneva
- Cheval et paysanne, at Collège Jacques-Dalphin, Carouge
- Tête de cheval, at Mairie de Lancy, Lancy
- Lutteur au repos, at Stade de Frontenex, Geneva
- Saint Martin, 1958, at Rue Dizerens 25, Geneva
- Chute de cheval et cavalier, 1954, bronze
