= Ernesta Robert-Mérignac =

French sculptor

- Born: 25 August 1849; Saint-Omer, France
- Died: 18 February 1933 (aged 83); Paris, France
- Occupation: Sculptor

Ernesta Robert-Mérignac (French pronunciation: [ɛʁnɛsta ʁɔbɛʁ meʁiɲak]; 25 August 1849 – 18 February 1933) was a French sculptor. Her work was part of the sculpture event in the art competition at the 1924 Summer Olympics.
