= Jean Verschneider =

French sculptor

- Born: 29 August 1872
- Died: 20 December 1943 (aged 71)
- Occupation: Sculptor

Jean Verschneider (29 August 1872 – 20 December 1943) was a French sculptor. His work was part of the sculpture event in the art competition at the 1924 Summer Olympics.
