= Bas Veth =

Dutch painter

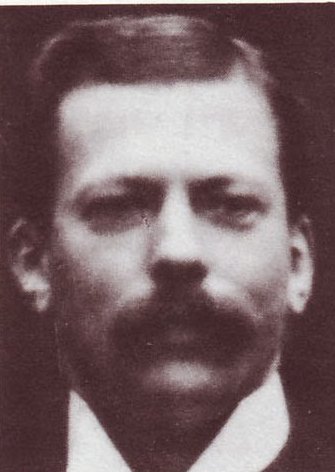
- Born: 12 March 1861; Arnhem, Netherlands
- Died: 4 April 1944 (aged 83); Gouvieux, France
- Occupation: Painter

Bas Veth (12 March 1861 – 4 April 1944) was a Dutch painter. His work was part of the painting event in the art competition at the 1924 Summer Olympics.
