= Juraj Škarpa =

Croatian sculptor

- Born: 29 November 1881; Stari Grad, Austria-Hungary
- Died: 31 December 1952 (aged 71); Zagreb, Yugoslavia
- Occupation: Sculptor

Juraj Škarpa (29 November 1881 – 31 December 1952) was a Croatian sculptor. His work was part of the sculpture event in the art competition at the 1924 Summer Olympics.
