= Henri Jean Pontoy =

French painter

- Born: 5 February 1888; Reims, France
- Died: 1968 (aged 79–80)
- Occupation: Painter

Henri Jean Pontoy (5 February 1888 – 1968) was a French painter. His work was part of the painting event in the art competition at the 1924 Summer Olympics.
