= Maurice Busset =

French painter, engraver and war artist

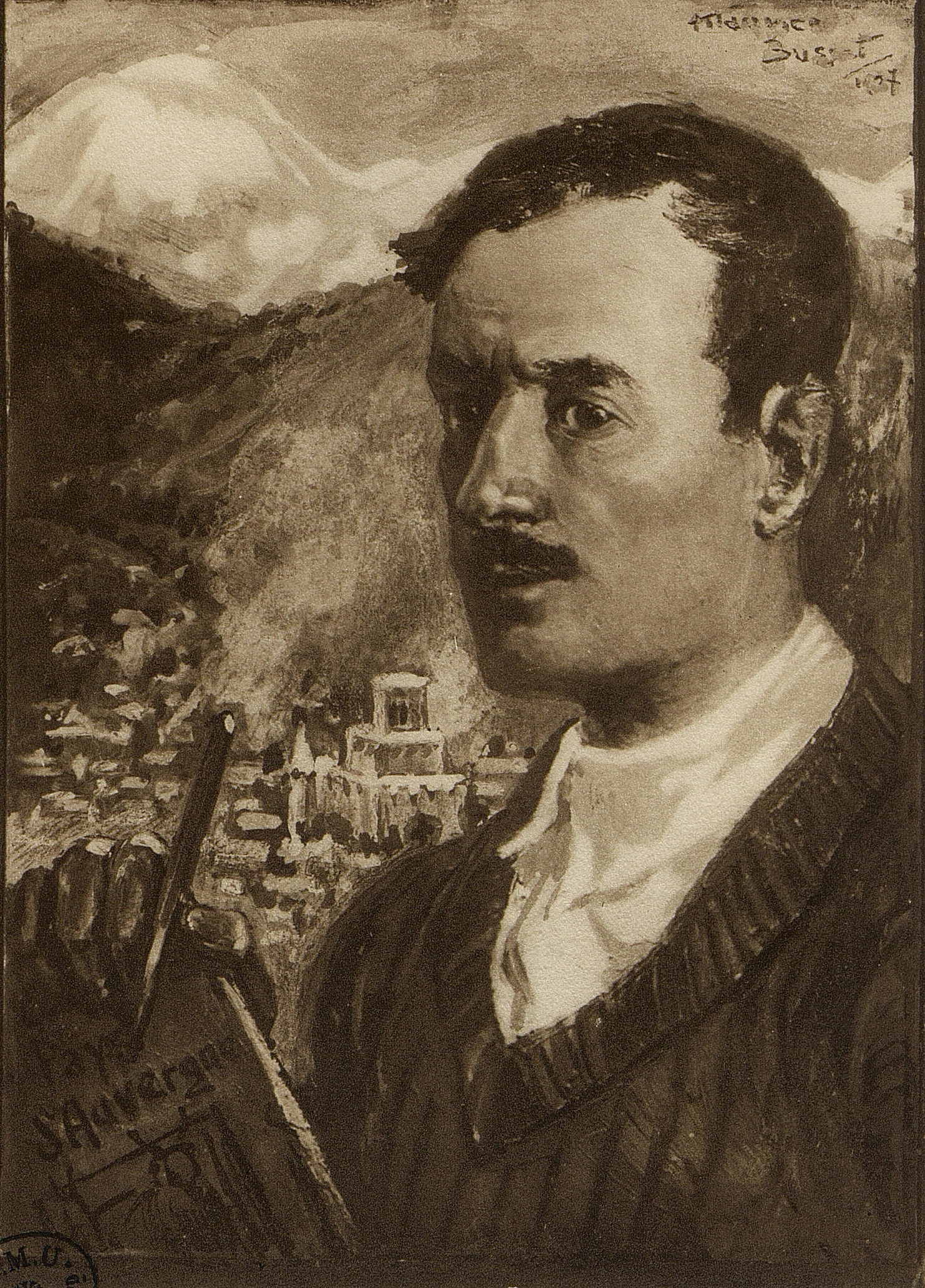
- Born: 18 December 1879; Clermont-Ferrand, France
- Died: 30 April 1936 (aged 56); Clermont-Ferrand, France
- Occupation: Painter

Maurice Busset (18 December 1879 – 30 April 1936) was a French painter and woodcut engraver. During World War I he was an airman and an official war artist, and a significant number of his works relate to aviation during the war. His other main subject was his native Auvergne.

== Biography ==
Busset was born in Clermont-Ferrand in the Auvergne, son of Gilbert Busset, a lemonade maker. During his youth he spent a lot of time in the region of Saint-Bonnet-près-Orcival, where the rural landscapes and the ways of the country people made a great impression on him, inspiring his future work. His youthful sketches and watercolours were of the mountains and the peasants of the Auvergne.

He carried out his military service with the 105th regiment in Riom in 1900-01, and was promoted to corporal in May 1901. In August 1904, after a further 28 days in the area, he was appointed an officer of the reserve. He left sketches of both these periods.

In 1915 he joined the military aeronautics command in the Ministry of War as a flier, in the section concerned with the art and archives of flying. He created a series of major canvases on the theme of military aviation and a number of albums illustrated with engraved plates of aerial views over Paris showing damage from bombardments.

In 1915-1916, he was promoted to flight mechanic-sergeant attached to the 1st aviation group. Later, as an NCO in the 10th infantry regiment during the Alsace-Lorraine campaign, Busset took part in the battle of the Bois d'Ailly, in the forest of Apremont near Saint-Mihiel in the department of Meuse, during which he made his well-known drawing of the burial of three foot soldiers from Auvergne.

After the war Busset took to teaching. In the 1920s he was a drawing master at the Lycée Henri-IV in Paris. He later became director of the École des Beaux-Arts of Clermont-Ferrand (and assistant conservator of the Musée Bargoin in the same place). During this time he produced many engravings and paintings of landscapes in the Auvergne which he exhibited at the Salon d'automne, the Salon des Indépendants and the Société nationale des beaux-arts, as well as scenes from the war.

He submitted work for the painting event in the art competition at the 1924 Summer Olympics.

He was also well-known as one of the first, in 1933, to propose the idea that the sites of Chanturgue and the Côtes de Clermont, to the north of Clermont-Ferrand, were the real site of the Battle of Gergovia, and in the same year published a book on it: Gergovia, capitale des Gaules et l'oppidum du plateau des Côtes (Paris, Librairie Delagrave, 1933, 148 p., illustrated). This hypothesis was notably supported after Busset by the prominent local historian and archaeologist Paul Eychart but rejected by the majority of historians and archaeologists and contradicted by more recent investigations into the site Merdogne-Gergovie to the south of the town.

Busset died in 1936 and was buried in the Cimetière des Carmes in Clermont-Ferrand.

A street in the centre of Clermont-Ferrand is named after him.

== Publications ==
- Paris Bombardé: deux eaux fortes originales, treize bois gravés en couleurs exécutés pendant le bombardement de Paris, janvier-juillet 1918, Paris, Ed. Blondel la Rougery, 1918 (online version)
- En avion, vols et combats: estampes et récits de la Grande Guerre, 1914-1918, Paris, Delagrave, 1919 (online version)
- Au pied des Puys: images des pays d'Auvergne, Paris, édition des Images de Paris, 1922 (online version)
- Le Vieux Pays d'Auvergne. Recueil des costumes, des types et des coutumes de Haute et Basse-Auvergne. Notés et dessinés en l'an 1923, Clermont-Ferrand, Impr. G. Mont-Louis, 1924, 67 p.
- La technique moderne du bois gravé et les procédés anciens des xylographes du XVIe siècle et des maîtres graveurs japonais, recueillis et mis à la portée des artistes et des amateurs, Paris, Delagrave, 1925, 172 p. (online version). Revised in 1927 and 1929
- La technique moderne du tableau et les procédés secrets des grands coloristes des XVe, XVIe et XVIIe siècles, Paris, Delagrave, 1929
- "Maroc et Auvergne", in L'Auvergne littéraire, artistique et historique, no 45, 1945
- Gergovia, capitale des Gaules et l'oppidum du plateau des Côtes, Paris, Librairie Delagrave, 1933, 148 p.

=== As illustrator ===
- J. Théron, Vieux airs d'Auvergne, thèmes de bourrées, rondes, chants populaires, recueillis et harmonisés, Clermont-Ferrand, C. Perretière, 1914
- Jean Bouchary, Images d'Auvergne, Paris, édition de la 'Revue de l'Univers', 1923, 76 p.
- Jean Bouchary, Gens d'Auvergne. Contes, suivis de la littérature auvergnate. Critique, Paris, éditions de la 'Revue de l'Univers', 1924, 16 p.
- Georges Desdevises du Dezert, Les Monts d'Auvergne et le peintre Maurice Busset, ouvrage... illustré de nombreux croquis dans le texte et de cent héliogravures reproduisant l’œuvre de l'artiste, Aurillac, Edition U. S. H. A., 1931, 70 p. (online version)

=== As poster artist ===
- Ville de Clermont-Ferrand. 18-21 Mai 1907. XXIIIe Fête fédérale de l'Union des Sociétés de Gymnastique de France, 1907.
- Kursaal de Royat : Samedi 19 juillet 1913 à 8h1/2: Soirée d'art régionaliste organisée par la Veillée d'Auvergne, 1913.
- Du 1er au 8 juillet 1923 Semaine auvergnate de Clermont-Ferrand. Tricentenaire de Blaise Pascal: Foire exposition régionale, 1923.

== Works in public collections ==
These include:

- Clermont-Ferrand:

Musée d'Art Roger-Quilliot - 6 paintings
Bibliothèque du Patrimoine de Clermont Auvergne Métropole - posters, sketch books, portfolios

- Le Bourget:

Musée de l'Air et de l'Espace - portfolio of prints Nos Escadrilles pendant la Grande Guerre

- Paris:

Musée de l'Armée Invalides - 10 paintings, including Sur la mer des nuages
Musée du Luxembourg - La traite en montagne (1920); Berger de Chaudefour (1925)
Musée Carnavalet - Bombardement de Paris en 1918. Incendie rue de Rivoli, 12 avril 1918; La sirène de Notre-Dame et les projecteurs sur Paris en 1918, vue prise d'une des tours de Notre-Dame
