= Frane Cota =

Croatian sculptor

- Born: 29 September 1898; Knin, Austria-Hungary
- Died: 20 January 1951 (aged 52); Zagreb, Yugoslavia
- Occupation: Sculptor

Frane Cota (29 September 1898 – 20 January 1951) was a Croatian sculptor. His work was part of the sculpture event in the art competition at the 1924 Summer Olympics.
