= Bernard van Vlijmen =

Dutch painter

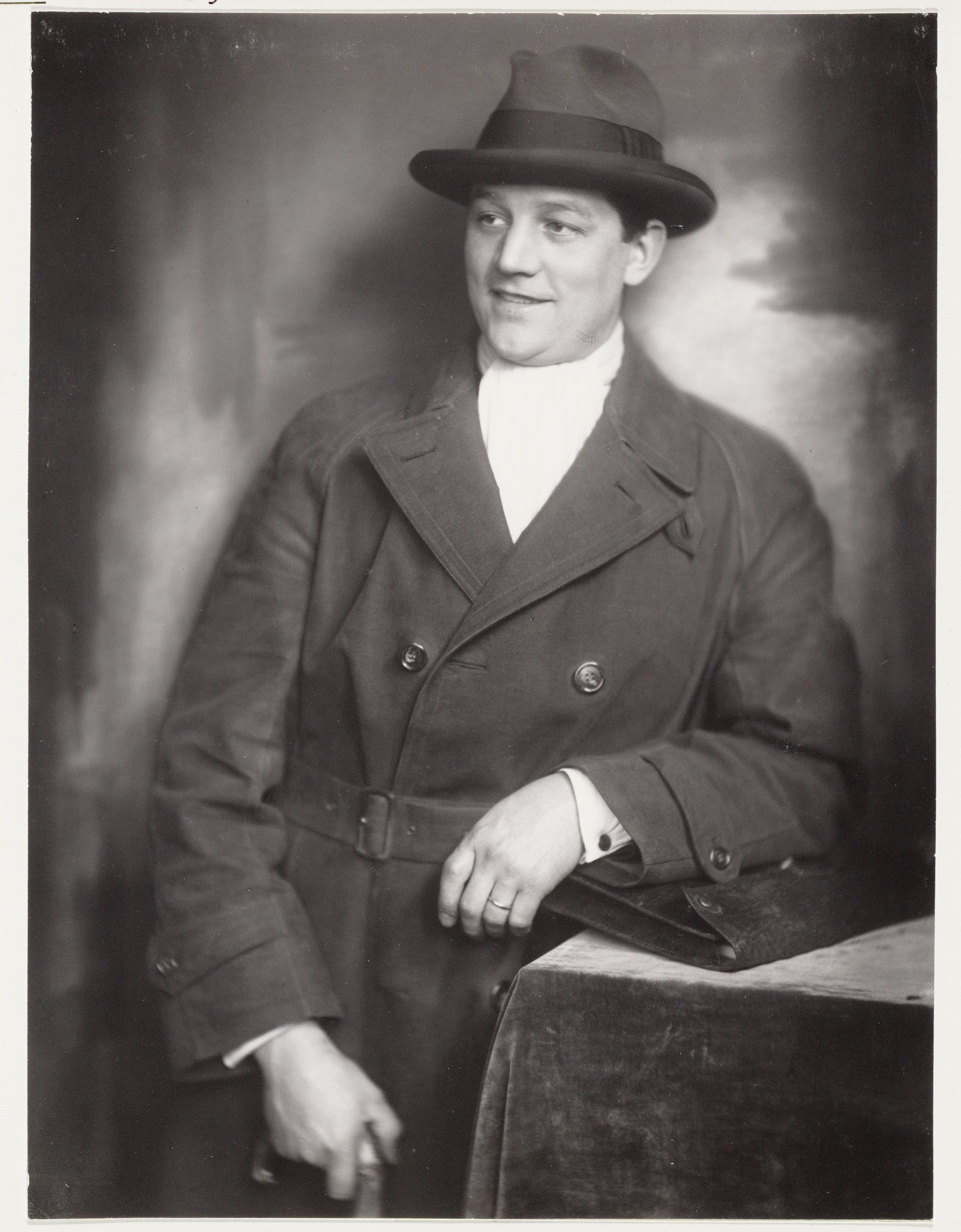
- Bernard van Vlijmen in 1925
- Born: 23 October 1895; The Hague, Netherlands
- Died: 1 August 1977 (aged 81); Bardolino, Italy
- Occupation: Painter

Bernard van Vlijmen (23 October 1895 – 1 August 1977) was a Dutch painter. His work was part of the painting event in the art competition at the 1924 Summer Olympics.
