= Raoul Lamourdedieu =

French sculptor

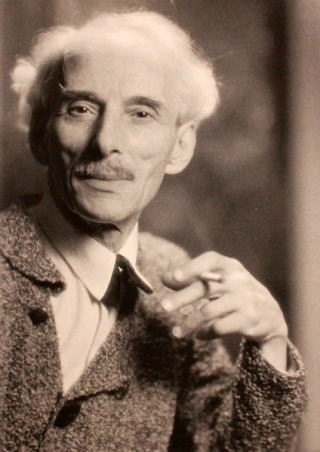
- Born: 2 February 1877; Fauguerolles, France
- Died: 8 May 1953 (aged 76); Pierrefonds, France
- Occupation: Sculptor

Raoul Lamourdedieu (2 February 1877 – 8 May 1953) was a French sculptor, and medallist. His work was part of the sculpture event in the art competition at the 1924 Summer Olympics.
