= Charles Gonnet =

French poet

Olympic medal record

Art competitions
Bronze medal – third place	1924 Paris	Literature

Charles-Anthoine Gonnet (November 3, 1897 – September 26, 1985) was a French poet. He was born in Laon. In 1924 he won a bronze medal in the art competitions of the Olympic Games for his "Vers le Dieu d'Olympie" ("Face to Face with Olympia's God").

Gonnet also represented the France national rugby union team.
