= René Besserve =

French painter

- Born: 1883; Montbéliard, France
- Died: 1959 (aged 75–76); Saint-Mandé, France
- Occupation: Painter

René Besserve (1883 – 1959) was a French painter. His work was part of the painting event in the art competition at the 1924 Summer Olympics.
