= Lucien Seevagen =

French painter

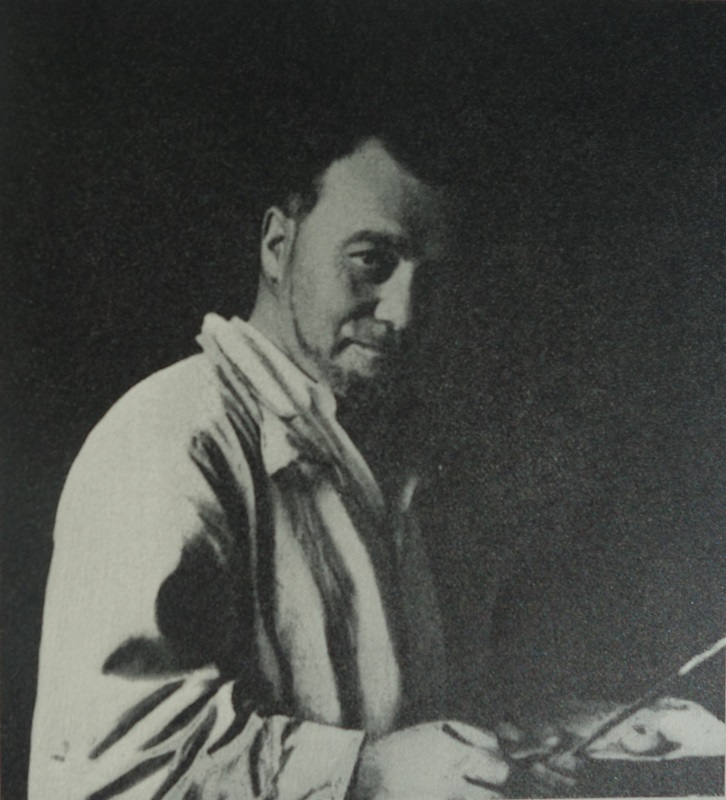
- Born: 29 January 1887; Chaumont, France
- Died: 25 June 1959 (aged 72); Île-de-Bréhat, France
- Occupation: Painter

Lucien Seevagen (29 January 1887 – 25 June 1959) was a French painter. His work was part of the painting event in the art competition at the 1924 Summer Olympics.
