= Georges Halbout =

French sculptor

- Born: 15 December 1895; Paris, France
- Died: 7 June 1986 (aged 90); Bourdeilles, France
- Occupation: Sculptor

Georges Halbout (15 December 1895 – 7 June 1986) was a French sculptor. His work was part of the sculpture event in the art competition at the 1924 Summer Olympics.
