= Cornelis van Steenwijk =

Dutch painter

- Born: 30 March 1897; The Hague, Netherlands
- Died: 11 February 1974 (aged 76); United States
- Occupation: Painter

Cornelis van Steenwijk (30 March 1897 – 11 February 1974) was a Dutch painter. His work was part of the painting event in the art competition at the 1924 Summer Olympics.
