= Paul de Plument de Bailhac =

French painter

- Born: 1 August 1864; L'Île-Saint-Denis, France
- Died: 6 July 1951 (aged 86); Paris, France
- Occupation: Painter

Paul de Plument de Bailhac (1 August 1864 – 6 July 1951) was a French painter. His work was part of the painting event in the art competition at the 1924 Summer Olympics.
