= Georges Villa =

French painter

- Born: 24 January 1883; Montmédy, France
- Died: 19 November 1965 (aged 82); Paris, France
- Occupation: Painter

Georges Villa (24 January 1883 – 19 November 1965) was a French painter. As an artist, he'd visit both the Russian Empire and Egypt during the Belle Époque. Villa was living in Russia when World War I broke out, and he joined the French Army as a reserve officer, and was injured by shrapnel in 1915. He then trained to become an aviation officer, ending the war in the rank of captain. His work was part of the painting event in the art competition at the 1924 Summer Olympics.

An example of Villa's art, a 1924 political cartoon
