= Henri Guerbois =

French architect

- Born: 1885
- Died: Unknown
- Occupation: Architect

Henri Guerbois (born 1885, date of death unknown) was a French architect. His work was part of the architecture event in the art competition at the 1924 Summer Olympics.
