= Pieter Verhagen =

Dutch architect

- Born: 26 August 1882; Beverwijk, Netherlands
- Died: 4 April 1950 (aged 67); Rockanje, Netherlands
- Occupation: Architect

Pieter Verhagen (26 August 1882 – 4 April 1950) was a Dutch architect. His work was part of the architecture event in the art competition at the 1924 Summer Olympics.
