= Georg Eichhorn =

Swiss sculptor

- Born: 1887
- Died: Unknown
- Occupation: Sculptor

Georg Eichhorn (born 1887, date of death unknown) was a Swiss sculptor. His work was part of the sculpture event in the art competition at the 1924 Summer Olympics.
