= Marcel Berger (writer) =

French writer

- Born: 13 May 1885; Crèvecœur-le-Grand, France
- Died: 17 November 1966 (aged 81); Saint-Maurice, France
- Occupation: Writer

Marcel Berger (13 May 1885 – 17 November 1966) was a French writer. His work was part of the literature event in the art competition at the 1924 Summer Olympics.
