= André Planson =

French painter

- Born: 10 April 1898; La Ferté-sous-Jouarre, France
- Died: 29 September 1981 (aged 83); Neuilly-sur-Seine, France
- Occupation: Painter

André Planson (10 April 1898 – 29 September 1981) was a French painter. His work was part of the painting event in the art competition at the 1924 Summer Olympics.
