= Maurice Dambrun =

French architect

- Born: Maurice Louis Achille Dambrun; 2 December 1887; Paris, France
- Occupation: Architect

Maurice Louis Achille Dambrun (2 December 1887 – after 1951) was a French architect. His work was part of the architecture event in the art competition at the 1924 Summer Olympics.
