= Raoul Bénard =

French sculptor

- Born: 30 September 1881; Elbeuf, France
- Died: 24 July 1961 (aged 79); Hendaye, France
- Occupation: Sculptor

Raoul Bénard (30 September 1881 – 24 July 1961) was a French sculptor. His work was part of the sculpture event in the art competition at the 1924 Summer Olympics.
