= Pauline Lacroix =

French painter

- Born: 27 February 1892; Paris, France
- Died: 29 December 1977 (aged 85)
- Occupation: Painter

Pauline Lacroix (27 February 1892 – 29 December 1977) was a French painter. Her work was part of the painting event in the art competition at the 1924 Summer Olympics.
