= Amleto Cataldi =

Italian sculptor

- Born: 2 November 1882; Naples, Italy
- Died: 10 September 1930 (aged 47); Rome, Italy
- Occupation: Sculptor

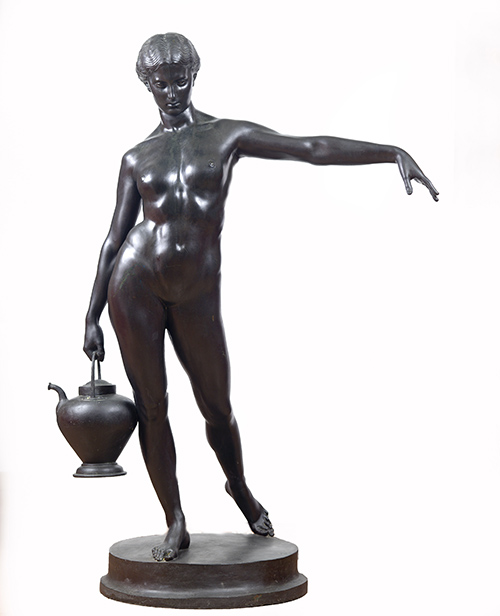
Bronze sculpture depicting a water carrier by Amleto Cataldi

Amleto Cataldi (2 November 1882 – 10 September 1930) was an Italian sculptor. His work was part of the sculpture event in the art competition at the 1924 Summer Olympics.
