= Louis Delapchier =

French sculptor

- Born: 19 October 1878; Saint-Denis, France
- Died: 30 June 1959 (aged 80); Paris, France
- Occupation: Sculptor

Louis Marie Jules Delapchier (19 October 1878 – 30 June 1959) was a French sculptor. His work was part of the sculpture event in the art competition at the 1924 Summer Olympics.
