= Marguerite Anne de Blonay =

Swiss sculptor

- Born: 9 July 1897; Zinswiller, France
- Died: 18 July 1966 (aged 69); Marchais-en-Brie, France
- Occupation: Sculptor

Marguerite Anne de Blonay (9 July 1897 – 18 July 1966) was a Swiss sculptor. Her work was part of the sculpture event in the art competition at the 1924 Summer Olympics.
