= Madeleine Cotty =

French painter

- Born: 26 August 1884; Paris, France
- Died: 26 February 1929 (aged 44)
- Occupation: Painter

Madeleine Cotty (26 August 1884 – 26 February 1929) was a French painter. His work was part of the painting event in the art competition at the 1924 Summer Olympics.
