= Eugène Bourgoin =

French sculptor

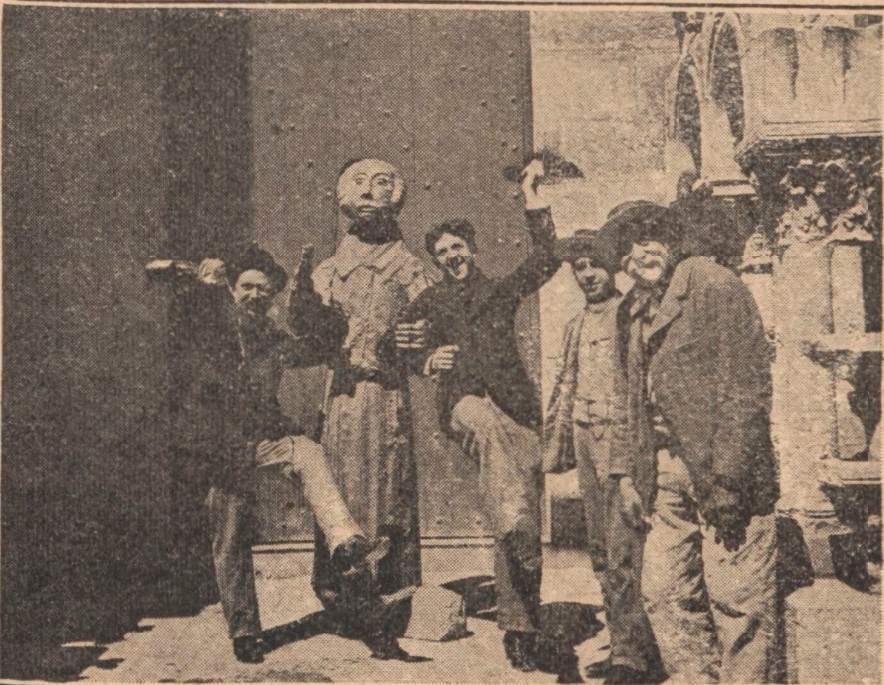
- Born: 12 February 1880; Reims, France
- Died: 30 October 1924 (aged 44); Paris, France
- Occupation: Sculptor

Eugène Bourgoin (12 February 1880 – 30 October 1924) was a French sculptor. His work was part of the sculpture event in the art competition at the 1924 Summer Olympics.
