= Elie Hervier =

French sculptor

- Born: 15 February 1896; Paris, France
- Died: 5 January 1987 (aged 90); Royat, France
- Occupation: Sculptor

Elie Hervier (15 February 1896 – 5 January 1987) was a French sculptor. His work was part of the sculpture event in the art competition at the 1924 Summer Olympics.
