= Johan Vilhelm Andersen =

Danish painter

- Born: 17 January 1892; Copenhagen, Denmark
- Died: 29 November 1971 (aged 79); Copenhagen, Denmark
- Occupation: Painter

Johan Vilhelm Andersen (17 January 1892 – 29 November 1971) was a Danish painter. His work was part of the painting event in the art competition at the 1924 Summer Olympics. He studied at the Royal Danish Academy of Fine Arts.
