= Konstantinos Dimitriadis =

Greek sculptor

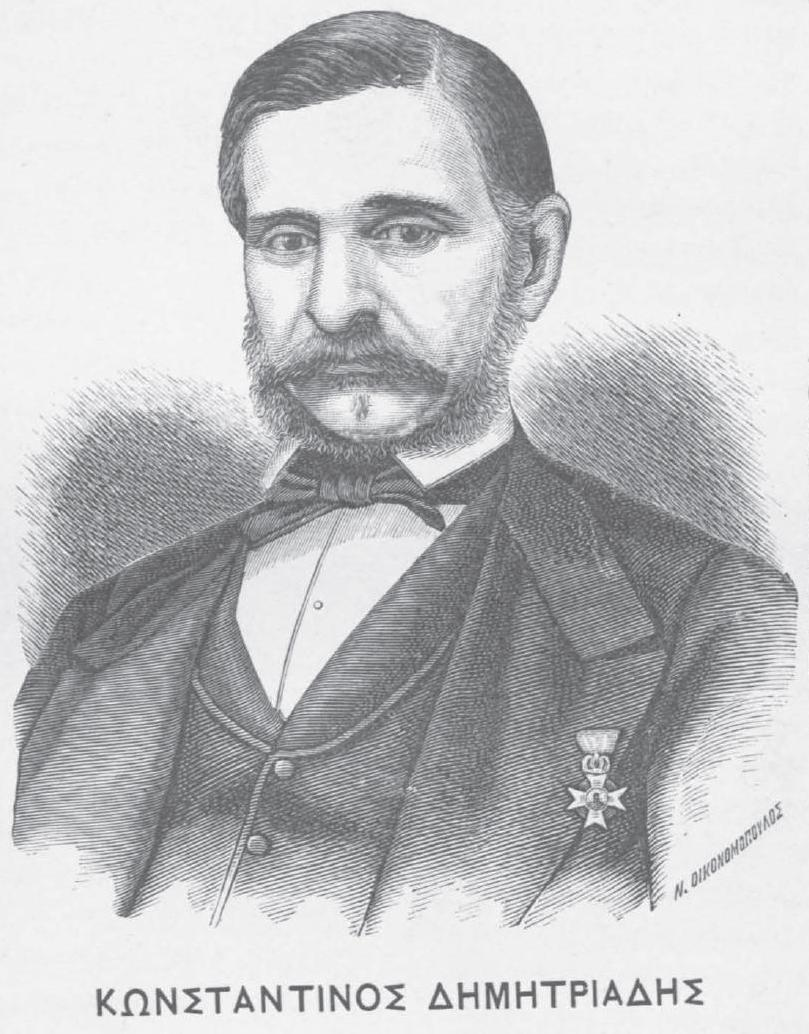
- Konstantinos Dimitriadis (original greek: Κωνσταντίνος Δημητριάδης)
- Born: 1879; Stanimaka, Eastern Rumelia (today Bulgaria)
- Died: 1943 (aged 63–64); Athens

Konstantinos Dimitriadis (Greek: Κωνσταντίνος Δημητριάδης; 1879 or 1881 – 28 October 1943) was a Greek sculptor who won a gold medal at the art competitions at the 1924 Summer Olympics for his sculpture Finnish discus thrower.

== Biography ==
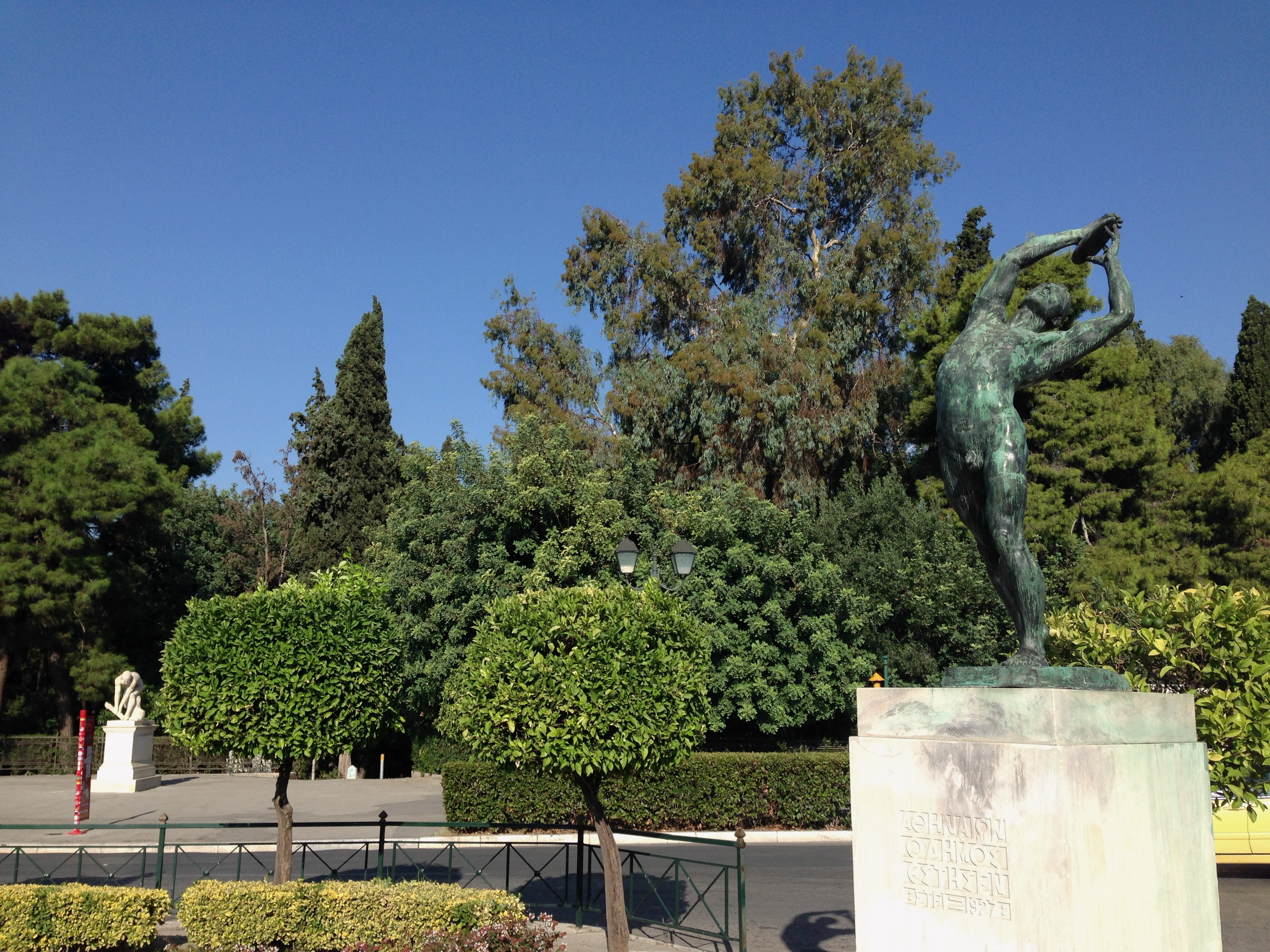
The Athens copy of the "Discus thrower" (Discobolus)

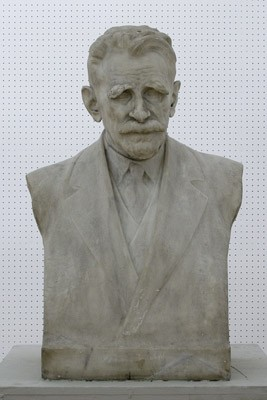
Bust of poet Kostis Palamas by Dimitriadis

He was born in 1881 or in 1879 in Stenimachos (Στενήμαχος).

He studied at the ASFA Athens School of Fine Arts and then went with a scholarship to the Académie de la Grande Chaumière and the École nationale supérieure des Beaux-Arts in Paris, where he stayed after his studies. In 1928 or 1930 he became the director of the Athens School of Fine Arts.

He was elected a member of the Academy of Athens in 1936. His works were exhibited at the Paris Salon and Salon d'Automne and the 1936 Venice Biennale. He died in Athens in 1943.

== Works ==
- Dilemma (1907)
- Finnish discus thrower (1924): three copies, including one originally in Central Park, now in Randall's Island Park, and one close to the Panathenaic Stadium in Athens, Greece
- To the Defeated of Life (large work in 12 parts)
- Agia Lavra
- Liberation of Chios Island
- The Bacchae
- The Sceptic
- The Bathing Woman
- Muhammad Ali of Egypt on his horse in Kavala, Greece
