= France Darget Savarit =

French writer (1886–1965)

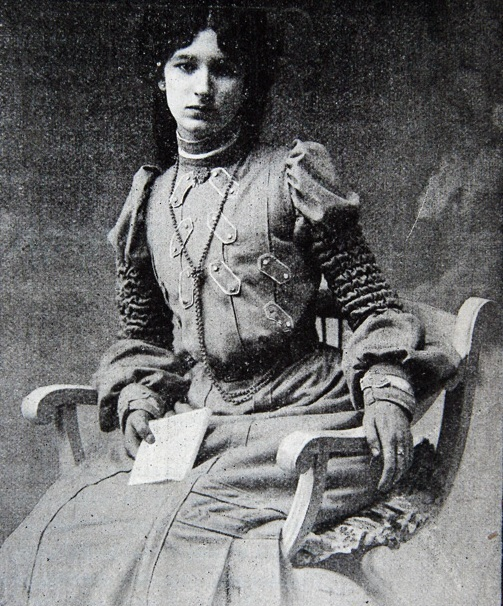
- Born: 26 December 1886; Pontivy, France
- Died: 26 August 1965 (aged 78)
- Occupation: Writer
- Children: Claude Darget

France Darget Savarit (26 December 1886 – 26 August 1965) was a French writer. Her work was part of the literature event in the art competition at the 1924 Summer Olympics.

Her poetry began being published in newspapers in Tours. When she was just fourteen years old in 1901, a book of her poetry was published and well received by critics. The topics of her poems included a volcanic eruption in Martinique, the legendary figure Semiramis and the Franco-Prussian War.
