= Jean René Gauguin =

French-Danish sculptor

Olympic medal record

Art competitions
Bronze medal – third place	1924 Paris	Sculpture

Jean René Gauguin (April 12, 1881 – April 21, 1961) was a French-Danish sculptor. He won a bronze medal for Denmark in the art competitions at the 1924 Summer Olympics for his Boxer.

== Biography ==
The fourth child of the marriage of Paul Gauguin (1848–1903) and Mette Sophie Gad (1850–1920), Jean René Gauguin was born in Paris in 1881. His family moved to Copenhagen in 1884 where his father briefly and unsuccessfully tried making a living as a tarpaulin salesman. Six months on, his father left Copenhagen for Paris and beyond to pursue his life of creativity and wanderlust. Jean René last saw his father at age ten when Paul spent two weeks in Copenhagen before leaving for Tahiti. They had little communication as Jean René spoke no French at that time and his father spoke no Danish.

Jean René was raised in Copenhagen by his mother Mette and maternal grandparents. Albeit from a bourgeois Danish family he was brought up in very modest circumstances. At the age of eight he fell out a third floor window and sustained severe injuries from which he recovered. He left school in 1895 and undertook an 11-month sailor's training program. Thereafter he apprenticed as a carpenter but hated the trade and went back to working as a sailor.

In 1904 shortly after Paul Gauguin's death he inherited three of his father's paintings that he immediately sold. With these funds he traveled throughout Europe, venturing as far as Greece, visiting museums and viewing monuments wherever he went. These travels initiated his long artistic career.

He loved to travel and visited his birthplace, Paris, a number times learning French fluently. In 1927 he set off on an extremely long cycling tour of France. Starting in Lyon, he pedaled on to Montpellier, Lyon, Avignon, Narbonne, Toulouse, Orléans, Paris, Dunkerque, and completed the feat with a return leg all the way to Copenhagen. He visited Portugal in 1930 and visited Paris anew in 1937. Despite his wanderlust, his life and work remained rooted in Copenhagen. He was an outspoken socialist, not afraid to make his political views known. In December 1913 Jean René married Clara Federsen (1889–1966), from this marriage was born a son Pierre Sylvester. They settled at Nyhavn 33, Copenhagen but later separated. He married a second time 1935 with cartoonist Sys Poulsen (1909–1999) and from this union was born Lulu Gauguin in 1937. He is buried with a simple gravestone in the Vor Frelser cemetery in Copenhagen.

== His work ==
Jean René Gauguin was an active and prolific ceramist and sculptor from 1910 until shortly before his death in 1961. His ceramic production pieces were made in collaboration with Sleiss of Gmunden (Austria), Bing & Grøndahl, Copenhagen and Manufacture nationale de Sèvres. His earliest works were wood carvings however these rapidly evolved into bronze castings of athletes, dancers, centaurs, and classically inspired male and female torsos.

In 1921 he traveled to Gmunden, Austria and worked at the Sleiss Factory where he created tin glazed ceramic figures. As of 1923 he started working for the Bing and Grondahl ceramic studios for whom he continued creating new models throughout his life. His first major sculpture was a Boxer ( col. Statens Museum for Kunst) created in 1922 for the 1924 Paris Olympics. For this work the Olympic committee awarded him a bronze medal following a competition held at the Grand Palais in Paris. Jean Rene Gauguin exhibited several works created for B§G at the seminal 1925 Paris 'Exposition Internationale des Arts Décoratifs'. His large stoneware sculptural groups with themes from mythology won him critical acclaim and an article in the October issue of the influential revue 'Art et Décoration'. For these works he was awarded the 'Grand Prix de la Ceramique' . He equally showed a massive silver guild hall chalice created in collaboration with Georg Jensen and Anton Rosen. In 1927 he worked as guest artist at the Sèvres porcelain works. Around this time he received a commission to create a sculpture for the Jardin des Tuileries. Referred to as La Fontaine de Chine, no sign of this structure exists today and its whereabouts remain a mystery.

On April 6, 1932, Jean René Gauguin leapt off a ten-meter diving board into the gigantic swimming pool of the resort town of Havested. This was a fitting way to inaugurate his largest work, Sea Horse. An enormous stoneware structure built in this studios of Bing § Grondahl, Sea Horse was a remarkable undertaking. Inspired by the myths of Europa and Poseidon, it dominated a massive public swimming pool where it was totally destroyed by a falling scaffolding on June 14, 1952.

Throughout the 1930s and 1940s, his work continued to alternate between two principal mediums, bronze and stoneware. On the one hand he produced stylized athletes and animals cast in bronze. Alongside these he expressed his fascination with the sea and its myths and it's monsters creating a fascinating ceramic opus of tritons, nereids, underwater creatures, octopuses, and unusual depictions of the horses of Poseidon. The production pieces he created for Bing § Grondahl were executed in polychrome glazed stoneware or porcelain for the smaller figures. Expressive monkeys, water buffaloes, tigers and lions in ceramic form also populated his universe. In his studio pieces he often opted for rough surfaced unglazed stoneware, witness his impressive urns with Chinese inspired temple dogs as lid handles.

In the 1950s, his ceramics became inspired from pre-Columbian Peru home of his paternal grandmother. He created a series of bottle shapes incorporating sculptural depictions. In the last year of his life these evolved into a surreal series of screaming agonizing ceramic vessels.

In interviews with journalists he clearly stated that his namesake had been a hindrance to his career. Although his work would never become a pillar of modern art like his father's, his oeuvre was totally original and not a pastiche based on a recognizable name. He expressed that bearing the Gauguin name had been a barrier to museums and art critiques accepting his work seriously.

His work interpreted the vibrant bright color spectrum used by Scandinavian painters of the early years of the 20th century onto stoneware. His formal language created a rapprochement between the erotic and the fantastic. In his depiction of an underwater world he excelled in the illustration of the phantasmagorical and the grotesque. His technical prowess with glazed figural stoneware remains unparalleled to this day as were his experiments in polychrome glaze work. Paienne cultures as diverse of China and Peru were amongst his many sources of inspiration. With his mastery of the human figure he brought to life musicians, storytellers, athletes, dancers, and jockeys, and his capture of animal movement vitalized a whole menagerie of beasts, real and imagined.

== Catalog of works ==
Although there is to date no catalogue raissoné of the works of Jean René Gauguin, an excellent listing was established by Weilbachs Kunstnerleksikon in 1947. A major cataloged exhibition of his works was held at the Vejen Kunstuseum (Denmark) in 2002–2003 with 176 photos of individual works.

== Collections ==
- Art Institute of Chicago. (catalog no. 1971.815). Triton and Nereid
- The Metropolitan Museum of Art, New York U.SA, ceramic sculpture Surf, inventory number 46.94.1
- Royal Copenhagen Museum, Copenhagen, Denmark, numerous ceramics
- Fyns Kunsmuseum Odense bys Museer inv. JWL 188
- Arthus Kunsmeuseum inv. S72
- Statens Museum for Kunst inv. 5723
- Storstroms Kunsmuseum, Maribo
- Det danske Kunstindustriemuseum

The above listing is incomplete.

== Bibliography ==
- Revue Commerciale Danoise No. 7 Avril 1925, publieé par le Ministère des Affaires Etrangères par les soins de la Danish Publishing Office, Copenhagen
- Asger Bremer, Monograph Jean René Gauguin 1941
- Vejen Kunstuseum (Denmark) 2002–2003, catalogue
- "Jean René Gauguin And The Underwater World" Annette Rosenvald in Ordrupgaard Focus, 02, Ordrupgaard Denmark 2007

== Exhibitions ==
Gauguin exhibited throughout Europe as well as the US with one man shows and group showings of the Bing § Grondahl ceramic studios. His monumental works created huge interest and were the subject of many press articles. Weilbachs Kunstnerleksikon provides a very complete listing of his expositions.

- Den frie Udst. 1911–12; Der Sturm, München 1913;
- Charl. Forår 1914, 1916–17, 1919–21, 1923, 1937–44, 1946;
- Høstudst., Kristiania (Oslo) 1915- 16;
- Grønningen 1915, 1921–22, 1926, 1929–33;
- da. udst., Liljevalchs, Sth. 1918–19;
- KE 1920–21, 1923;
- Nord. konst, Göteborg 1923;
- Olympiske Lege, Paris 1924;
- verdensudst., Paris 1925, 1937, Bruxelles 1935;
- Det da. Kunststævne, Forum 1929;
- Barcelona 1929;
- Salon des Artistes décorateurs, Paris 1930;
- Exhib. of Painting, Sculpt. and Arch., Edinburgh 1934;
- da. udst., Amsterdam 1934;
- bien., Venezia 1936; da udst., Riga, Budapest, Bukarest 1936, Beograd 1937;
- Da.-norsk billedh.sammenslutn., Kunstnernes Hus, Oslo 1938; N.Y. 1939;
- Den off. da. Kunstudst. i Oslo 1946;
- Ny Carlsbergfondets jub.udst. Charl.borg 1952;
- Charl. Eft. 1953, 1958, 1961 (mindeudst.);
- Deense beeldhouwkunst, Stadspark Groningen 1957;
- Carl Gruvemans kunstsaml., Anneberg 1978;
- Erling Koefoeds saml. af maleri, skulp., grafik, Nikolaj, Kbh. 1980;
- Grønningen, de tidlige år, Glyptoteket 1990. Separatudstillinger: Oslo 1912, 1918;
- Bird, Eriksen & Ko., Vestervoldg., Kbh. 1913;
- Da. Kunsthdl., Kbh. 1918; Sèvres 1927; Sth. 1928; Kunsthallen, Kbh. 1936;
- Chr. Larsens Kunsthdl., Kbh. 1938; Bing & Grøndahl, Kbh. 1941, 1943, 1951, 1981.
