= Louise Amélie Landré =

French painter

- Born: 31 January 1852; Paris, France
- Died: 6 February 1934 (aged 82); Paris, France
- Occupation: Painter

Louise Amélie Landré (31 January 1852 – 6 February 1934) was a French painter. She studied under Jean Hubert and Charles Joshua Chaplin and made her debut at the Salon in 1876. In 1885, she became a member of the Société des Artistes Français. Three watercolors she painted in 1916 showing the lives of soldiers are in the collection of the Metropolitan Museum of Art.

In 1909 she obtained the first price at the Union des Femmes Peintres et sculpteurs. Her work was part of the painting event in the art competition at the 1924 Summer Olympics.

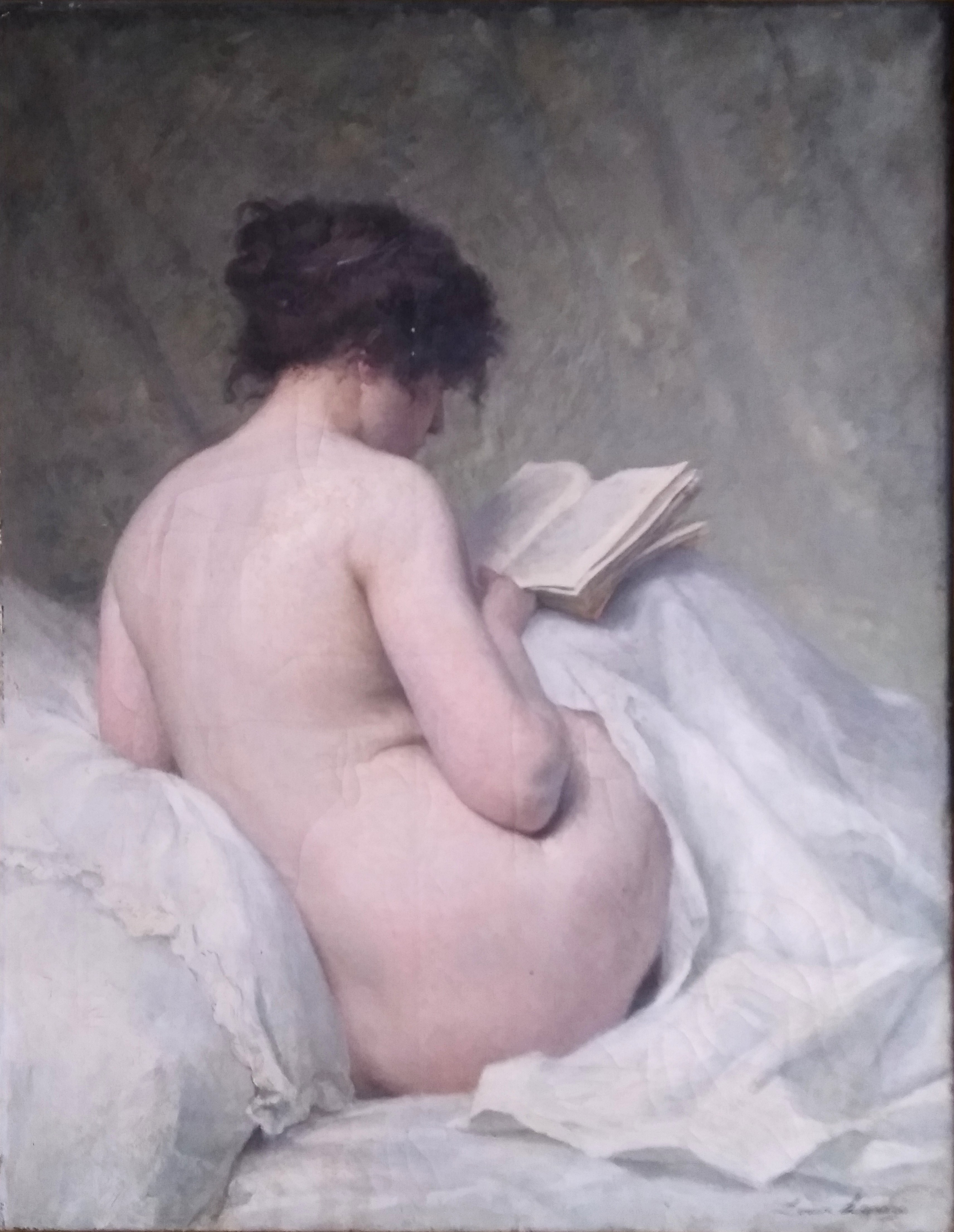
Lecture passionnante by Landré
