= Henry Masquilier Thiriez =

French composer

- Born: 16 August 1870; Tourcoing, France
- Died: 16 April 1954 (aged 83)
- Occupation: Composer

Henry Masquilier Thiriez (16 August 1870 – 16 April 1954) was a French composer. His work was part of the music event in the art competition at the 1924 Summer Olympics.
