= George Bamber =

British writer

- Born: 25 February 1887; Manchester, England
- Died: 6 January 1967 (aged 79); Manchester, England
- Occupation(s): Artist, writer

George Alfred Bamber (25 February 1887 – 16 January 1967) was a British artist and writer. His work was part of the art competition at the 1924 Summer Olympics.
