= Alfred Cros =

French sculptor

- Born: 2 July 1876; Paris, France
- Died: 28 November 1947 (aged 71)
- Occupation: Sculptor

Alfred Cros (2 July 1876 – 28 November 1947) was a French sculptor. His work was part of the sculpture event in the art competition at the 1924 Summer Olympics.
