= Pierre-Amédée Plasait =

French sculptor

- Born: 2 November 1878; Paris, France
- Died: 29 September 1939 (aged 60); Paris, France
- Occupation: Sculptor

Pierre-Amédée Plasait (2 November 1878 – 29 September 1939) was a French sculptor. His work was part of the sculpture event in the art competition at the 1924 Summer Olympics.
