= Enayat Allah Ibrahim =

Egyptian painter

- Born: 1898; Port Said, Egypt
- Died: 1972 (aged 73–74)
- Occupation: Painter

Enayat Allah Ibrahim (1898–1972) was an Egyptian painter. His work was part of the painting event in the art competition at the 1924 Summer Olympics.
