= Léo Rocco =

Swiss architect

- Born: 1894; Celerina/Schlarigna, Switzerland
- Died: 15 January 1976 (aged 81–82)
- Occupation: Architect

Léo Rocco (1894 – 15 January 1976) was a Swiss architect. His work was part of the architecture event in the art competition at the 1924 Summer Olympics.
