= Willem van Hasselt =

Dutch painter and footballer

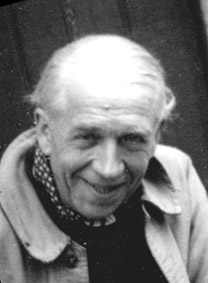
- Born: Wilhelmus Josephus van Hasselt; 3 September 1882; Rotterdam, Netherlands
- Died: 23 August 1963 (aged 80); Nogent-sur-Marne, France
- Citizenship: Dutch
- Occupations: Footballer; Painter
Association football career
Senior career*
Years	Team	Apps	(Gls)
1901–1905	Sparta		
1905–1907	Racing Club de France		
- * Club domestic league appearances and goals

Wilhelmus Josephus van Hasselt (3 September 1882 – 23 August 1963) was a Dutch footballer who played for Sparta Rotterdam, but he is best known for his work as a painter, which was part of the painting event in the art competition at the 1924 Summer Olympics.

== Biography ==
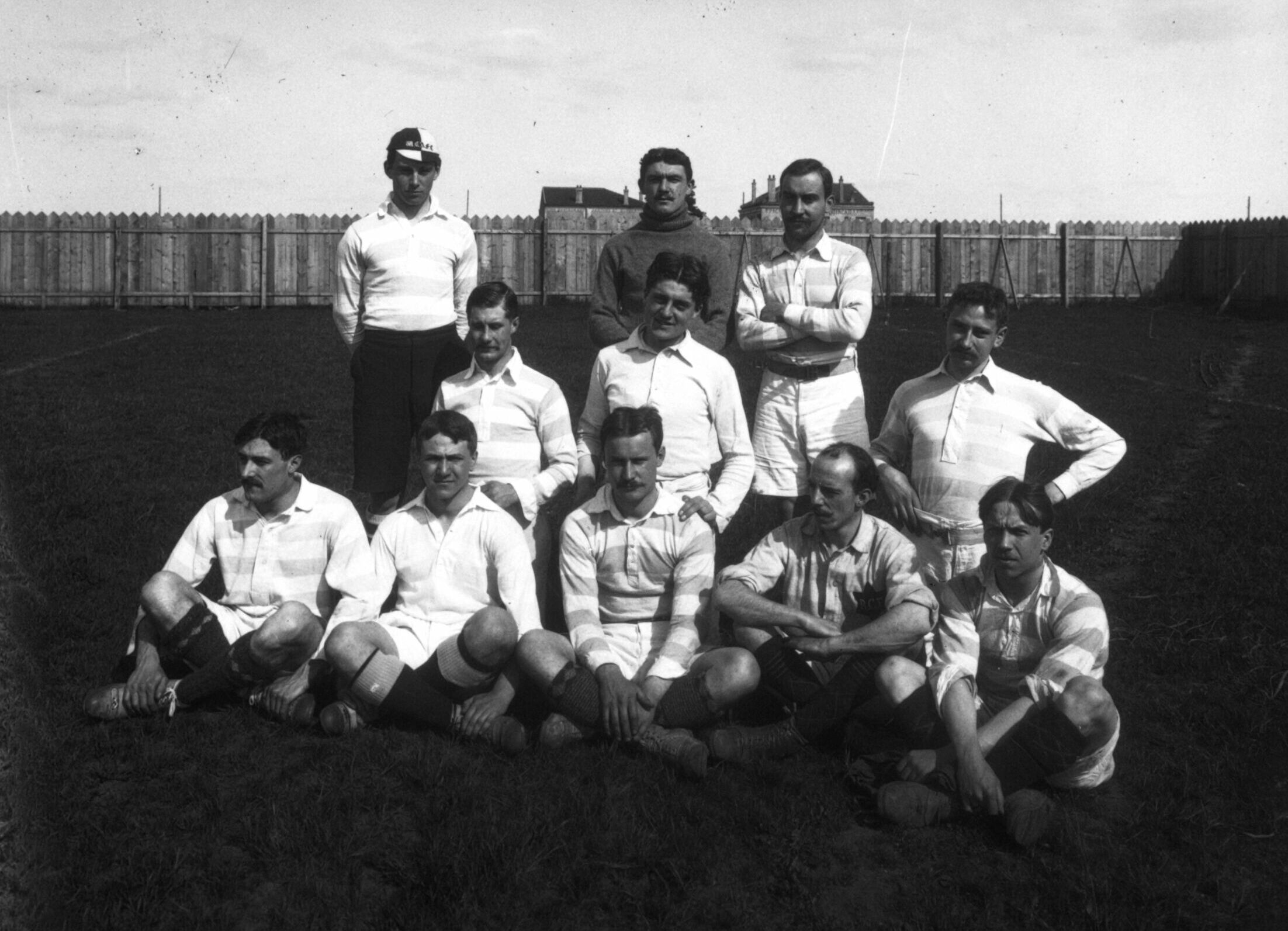
Racing wins the 1906 Coupe Dewar, with Van Hasselt (front row on the right) scoring the winning goals.

Willem van Hasselt was born in Rotterdam on 3 September 1882, as the son of Johannes Hendrikus van Hasselt (1846–1920), a tailor, and Mathilda Hendrika Hitters (1848–1933). He grew up in Rotterdam, in the districts bordering the canals, and studied at the Rotterdam Academy of Fine Arts, under the direction of the painters van Massdyck, Striesing, and Machtweh. He was also a member of Rotterdam's first football club, Sparta Rotterdam, making his debut on 3 March 1901, and playing his last match for the club on 15 January 1905.

In 1903, having obtained his diplomas, he left his country to continue his studies at the art academy of Paris, where in order to earn a living, he drew for newspapers and advertising, while in his leisure time was devoted to wandering around museums, where he discovered Camille Corto, who influenced his painting. In 1906, he designed a Sparta Match poster, and the player on the poster served as the basis for the current Sparta logo. He also began playing as a left winger for Racing Club de France as early as October 1905. He played a crucial role in helping the team reach the final of the 1906 Coupe Dewar against Gallia Club Paris, held at the Stade de Charentonneau on 6 May, scoring two late goals to help his side to a 2–1 comeback victory. His sporting career ended around 1910, following a tackle by Alfred Gindrat which broke his leg.

On 27 November 1909 and 29 January 1910, van Hasselt, now a press cartoonist, made caricatures of André Espir and André Billy, both being members of Racing Club de France. Van Hasselt then went to London, where while drawing for newspapers (The Star and The Morning Leader), he walked the National Gallery. He returned to France in the early 1910s, and then in 1911–12, he shared a studio with Édouard Saunier at 54 rue Notre-Dame-de-Lorette, and organized joint exhibitions there. He also exhibited with Jacques Salomon, nephew of Édouard Vuillard, which allowed him to enter Vuillard's entourage, also frequenting Maurice Denis, who had a considerable influence on his painting. In the build-up for the semifinals of 1912–13 French Rugby Union Championship between Bordeaux and Racing Club de France on 17 March 1912, van Hasselt made a large poster print (120 x 160 cm), which was used on a "one-page" program for the game, with the name of the players and a scorecard printed on the back. During the First World War, van Hasselt, who still did not have French nationality, served as an ambulance driver in the French Army.

In 1921, van Hasselt married the designer Louise Le Vavasseur, who introduced him to the Arcachon basin, which became a real source of inspiration since he painted a large number of seascapes and scenes of daily life there during the interwar period.

Willem van Hasselt obtained French nationality in 1933. In 1945, van Hasselt was elected to the Académie des Beaux-Arts, replacing André Devambez. From 1951 he was a member of the committee of the Institut Néerlandais and president of the Fra Angelico and France-Hollande associations.

In 1957, he moved to Nogent-sur-Marne, at the "Maison des artistes", where he died on 23 August 1963.
