= Franz Servais =

Luxembourgish writer and Olympian (1880–1966)

- Born: 1 March 1880
- Died: 31 January 1966 (aged 85)
- Occupation: Writer

Franz Servais (1 March 1880 – 31 January 1966) was a Luxembourgish writer. His work was part of the literature event in the art competition at the 1924 Summer Olympics.
