= Yvonne Meley =

French painter

- Born: 30 May 1888; Paris, France
- Died: 1 July 1982 (aged 94)
- Occupation: Painter

Yvonne Meley (30 May 1888 – 1 July 1982) was a French painter. She exposed in 1907, 1914 at the Salon de l'Union des femmes peintres et sculpteurs. Her work was part of the painting event in the art competition at the 1924 Summer Olympics.
