= Sonja Carstensen =

Danish architect (1898–1981)

- Born: 7 November 1898; Copenhagen, Denmark
- Died: 29 October 1981 (aged 82); Helsingør, Denmark
- Occupation: Architect

Sonja Carstensen (7 November 1898 – 29 October 1981) was a Danish architect. Her work was part of the architecture event in the art competition at the 1924 Summer Olympics. After completing architectural studies, Carstensen graduated from the Royal Academy of Fine Arts in 1926. She was one of only five women registered as a professional architect in Denmark during 1935.
