= Paul Roger-Bloche =

French sculptor

- Born: 31 May 1865; Paris, France
- Died: 1945 (aged 79–80); Paris, France
- Occupation: Sculptor

Paul Roger-Bloche (31 May 1865 – 1945) was a French sculptor. His work was part of the sculpture event in the art competition at the 1924 Summer Olympics.
