= Suzanne Daneau =

Belgian composer

- Born: 17 August 1901; Tournai, Belgium
- Died: 30 November 1971 (aged 70); Tournai, Belgium
- Occupation: Composer

Suzanne Laure Daneau (17 August 1901 – 30 November 1971), also known professionally by the pseudonym Luc Lalain, was a Belgian pianist and composer. Her work was part of the music event in the art competition at the 1924 Summer Olympics.
