= Hendrik Happé =

Dutch architect

- Born: 24 April 1884; Amsterdam, Netherlands
- Died: 10 April 1962 (aged 77); Breda, Netherlands
- Occupation: Architect

Hendrik Happé (24 April 1884 – 10 April 1962) was a Dutch architect. His work was part of the architecture event in the art competition at the 1924 Summer Olympics.
