= Pierre Segond-Weber =

French painter (1886–1966)

- Born: Pierre Eugène Mathieu Élie Segond-Weber; 3 September 1886; Gennevilliers, France
- Died: 27 November 1966 (aged 80); Le Mesnil-le-Roi, France
- Occupation: Painter

Pierre Segond-Weber (3 September 1886 – 27 November 1966) was a French painter. His work was part of the painting event in the art competition at the 1924 Summer Olympics.
