= Albert Laisant =

French writer

- Born: 1 June 1873; Tours, France
- Died: 23 November 1928 (aged 55); Asnières-sur-Seine, France
- Occupation: Writer

Albert Laisant (1 June 1873 – 23 November 1928) was a French writer. His work was part of the literature event in the art competition at the 1924 Summer Olympics.
