= Julius Schwyzer =

Swiss sculptor

- Born: 27 September 1876; Nottwil, Switzerland
- Died: 6 February 1929 (aged 52); Zürich, Switzerland
- Occupation: Sculptor

Julius Schwyzer (27 September 1876 – 6 February 1929) was a Swiss sculptor. His work was part of the art competitions at the 1924 Summer Olympics and the 1928 Summer Olympics.
