= Herman van der Kloot Meijburg =

Dutch architect

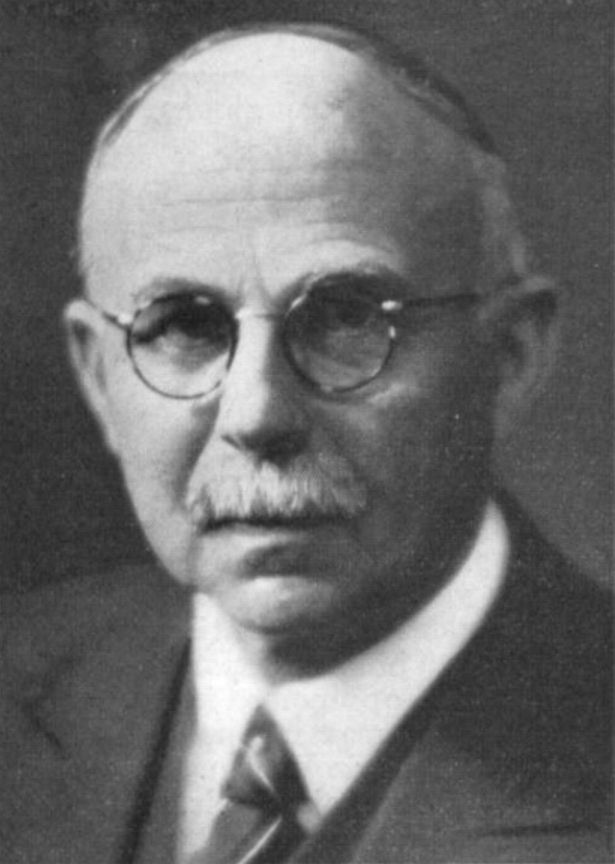
- Born: 21 October 1875; Oudshoorn, Netherlands
- Died: 19 April 1961 (aged 85); Scheveningen, Netherlands
- Occupation: Architect

Herman van der Kloot Meijburg (21 October 1875 – 19 April 1961) was a Dutch architect.

== Career ==
His work was part of the architecture event in the art competition at the 1924 Summer Olympics.
