= Piet van der Hem =

Dutch painter

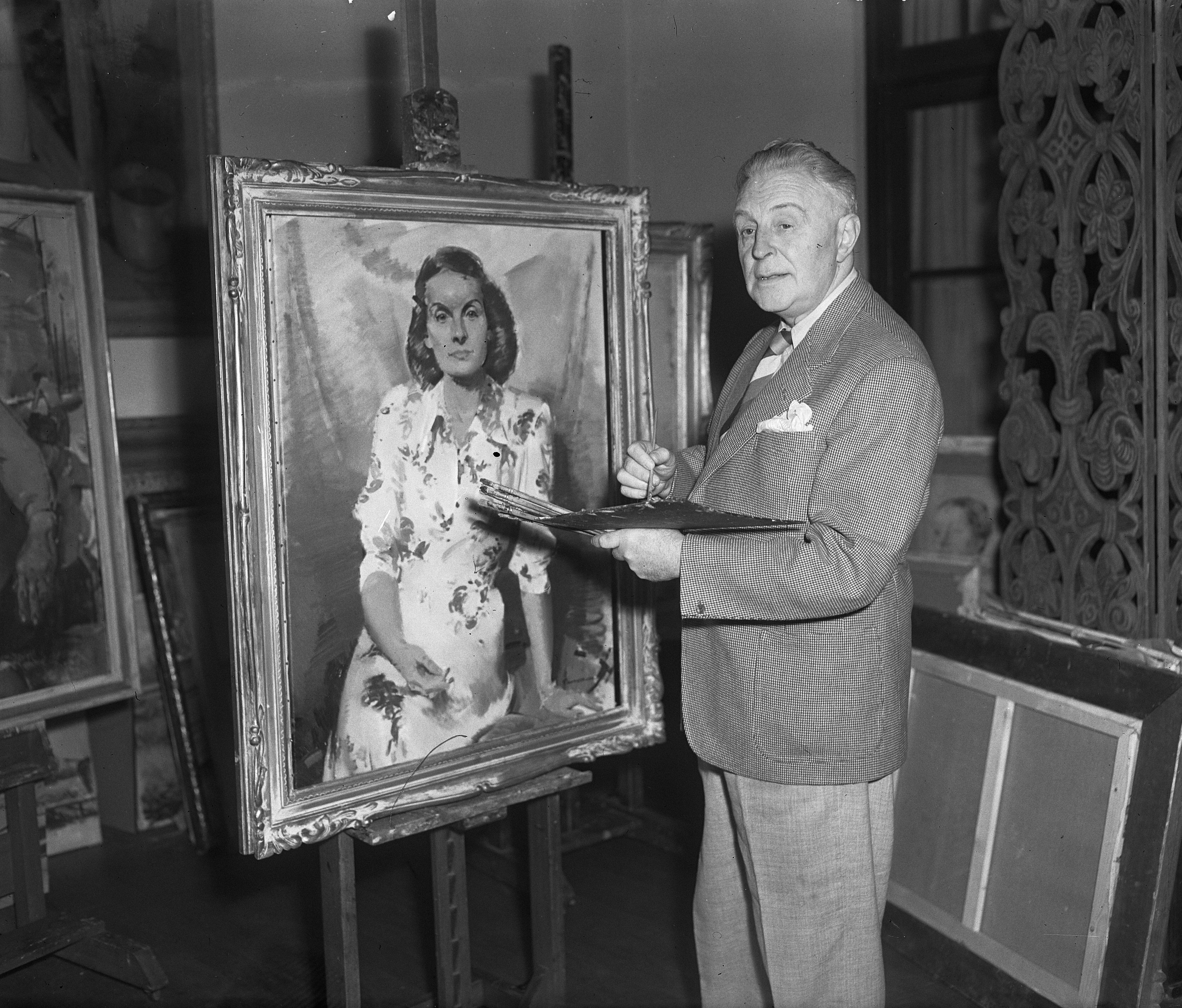
- Piet van der Hem in 1950
- Born: 9 September 1885; Wirdum, Netherlands
- Died: 24 April 1961 (aged 75); The Hague, Netherlands
- Occupations: Painter, illustrator

Piet van der Hem (9 September 1885 – 24 April 1961) was a Dutch painter, cartoonist, and illustrator. His work was part of the art competitions at the 1924 Summer Olympics, the 1932 Summer Olympics, and the 1936 Summer Olympics.
