= Patrick R. Chalmers =

Irish writer

Patrick Reginald Chalmers (27 June 1872 – 12 September 1942) was an Irish writer, who worked as a banker. His first book was Green Days and Blue Days (1912), followed by A Peck of Malt (1915).

He wrote in a number of different areas, including field sports, deerstalking and horse racing, as well biographies of Kenneth Grahame and J. M. Barrie. He was a contributor to Punch magazine and The Field, and editor of the hunting diaries of Edward VIII (as Prince of Wales). He also wrote much poetry, with topics war, dogs and cats, and Irish life, as well as hunting and fishing. His work was part of the literature event in the art competition at the 1924 Summer Olympics.

Variations on the line "What's lost upon the roundabouts we pulls up on the swings!", appearing in his poem "Roundabouts and Swings", have entered common parlance, though the origin is often no longer remembered. The phrase appeared six years earlier in the form "What we lose on the swings we make up on the roundabouts" in P.G. Wodehouse's 1906 novel Love Among the Chickens.
