= Samuel de Clercq =

Dutch architect (1876–1962)

- Born: 22 May 1876; Amsterdam, Netherlands
- Died: 19 March 1962 (aged 85); The Hague, Netherlands
- Occupation: Architect

Samuel de Clercq (22 May 1876 – 19 March 1962) was a Dutch architect. His work was part of the architecture event in the art competition at the 1924 Summer Olympics.
