= Raymond Rivoire =

French sculptor

- Born: 21 October 1884; Cusset, France
- Died: 27 September 1966 (aged 81); Paris, France
- Occupation: Sculptor

Raymond Rivoire (21 October 1884 – 27 September 1966) was a French sculptor. His work was part of the art competitions at the 1924 Summer Olympics and the 1928 Summer Olympics.
