= Heinrich Happe (politician, born 1894) =

German politician (1894–1979)

Member of the Bundestag
- In office 7 September 1949 – 7 September 1953

Personal details
- Born: 31 December 1894 EssenAltenessen
- Died: 12 January 1979 (aged 84)
- Party: SPD

Heinrich Happe (31 December 1894 – 12 January 1979) was a German politician of the Social Democratic Party (SPD) and member of the German Bundestag.

== Life ==
He was a member of the German Bundestag during the first legislative period from 1949 to 1953. He had entered parliament via the North Rhine-Westphalia state list.

== Literature ==
Herbst, Ludolf; Jahn, Bruno (2002). Vierhaus, Rudolf (ed.). Biographisches Handbuch der Mitglieder des Deutschen Bundestages. 1949–2002 [Biographical Handbook of the Members of the German Bundestag. 1949–2002] (in German). München: De Gruyter - De Gruyter Saur. p. 1715. ISBN 978-3-11-184511-1.
