= Giuseppe Lavini =

Italian painter and art critic

- Born: 27 April 1857; Turin, Kingdom of Sardinia
- Died: 3 March 1928 (aged 70); Turin, Italy
- Occupations: painter and art critic

Giuseppe Lavini (27 April 1857 - 3 March 1928) was an Italian painter and art critic.

He was born in the Piedmont, and a resident of Turin. He exhibited at Venice Portico in Liguria, and Studiosa. He excelled in seascapes and landscapes including Un rio a Venezia; Sul Po; Canal Grande, which were exhibited at Milan and Turin. In 1880 in Turin, he exhibited a genre painting titled: Le visite della padroncino; in Rome, in 1883, and Turin in 1884, he displayed a figure painting and a portrait. He had studied law, was knighted, and became secretary of the Albertina Academy of Fine Arts of Turin. He was also an art critic for the Gazzeta Piemontese. He wrote a biography of one of his mentors, Andrea Gastaldi (1826-1889) In 1893 Giuseppe married Marie Toesca, by whom he had three children: Amedeo (1894-1961), Celestina (1896-1977) and Adelina (1901-1990). His grandfather was Giuseppe Lavini senior (19 April 1776, Vercelli - 1 January 1847, Turin), a professor of chemistry and pharmacy at the University of Turin.
