= Peshoton Dubash =

British writer

- Born: 20 May 1891; Mumbai, British India
- Occupation: Writer

Peshoton Dubash (born 20 May 1891, date of death unknown) was a British writer. His work was part of the literature event in the art competition at the 1924 Summer Olympics.
