= Jos Klijnen =

Dutch architect

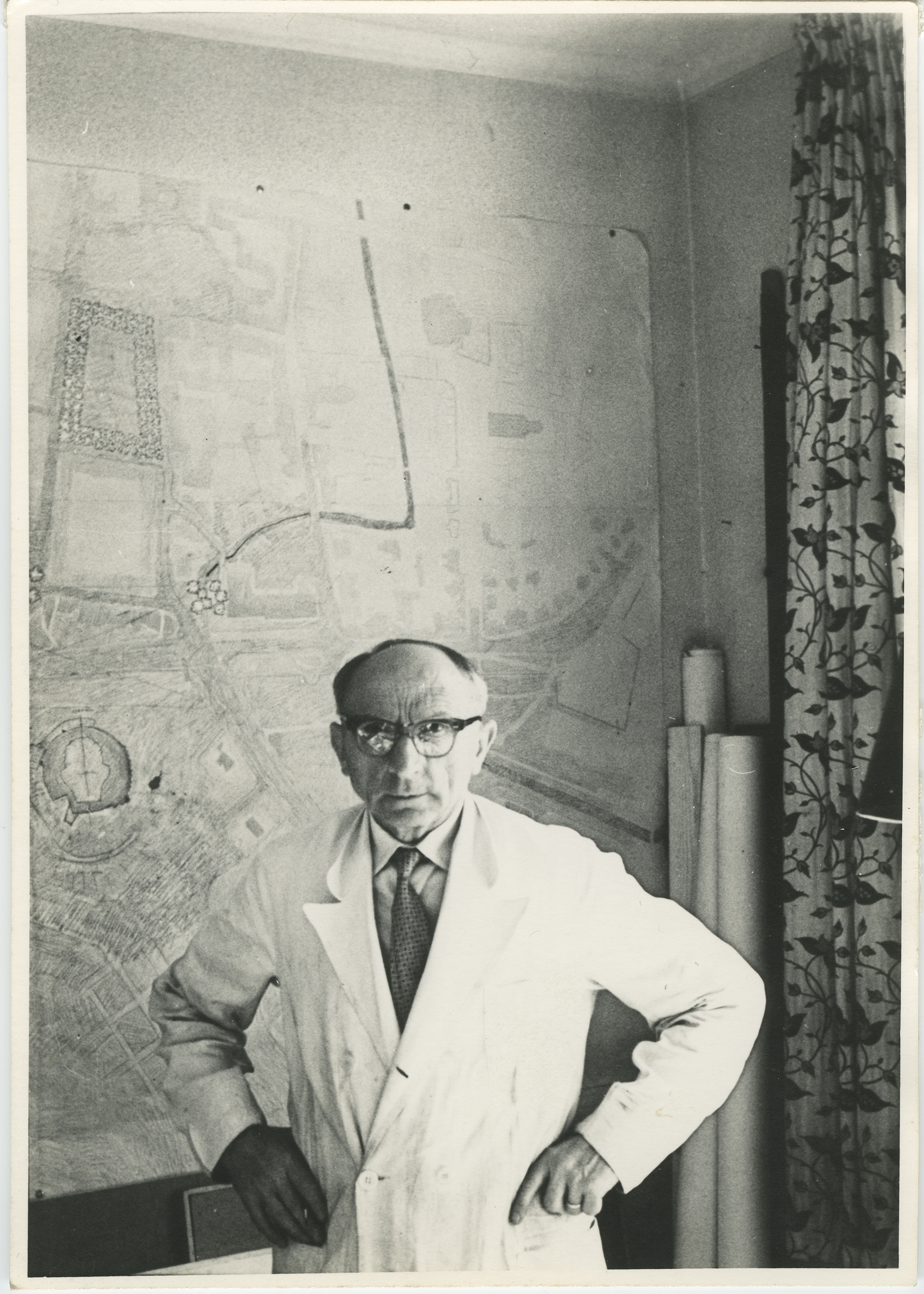
- Born: 7 January 1887; Maastricht, Netherlands
- Died: 5 January 1973 (aged 85); The Hague, Netherlands
- Occupation: Architect

Jos Klijnen (7 January 1887 – 5 January 1973) was a Dutch architect. His work was part of the architecture event in the art competition at the 1924 Summer Olympics.
