= Francisque Michot =

French sculptor

- Born: 5 October 1891; Firminy, France
- Died: 1 December 1968 (aged 77); Strasbourg, France
- Occupation: Sculptor

Francisque Michot (French: [fʁɑ̃sisk miʃo]; 5 October 1891 – 1 December 1968) was a French sculptor. His work was part of the sculpture event in the art competition at the 1924 Summer Olympics.
