= Hans Frei (sculptor) =

Swiss sculptor (1868-1947)

- Born: 30 April 1868; Basel, Switzerland
- Died: 14 March 1947 (aged 78); Riehen, Switzerland
- Known for: Medals, plaques and sculpture

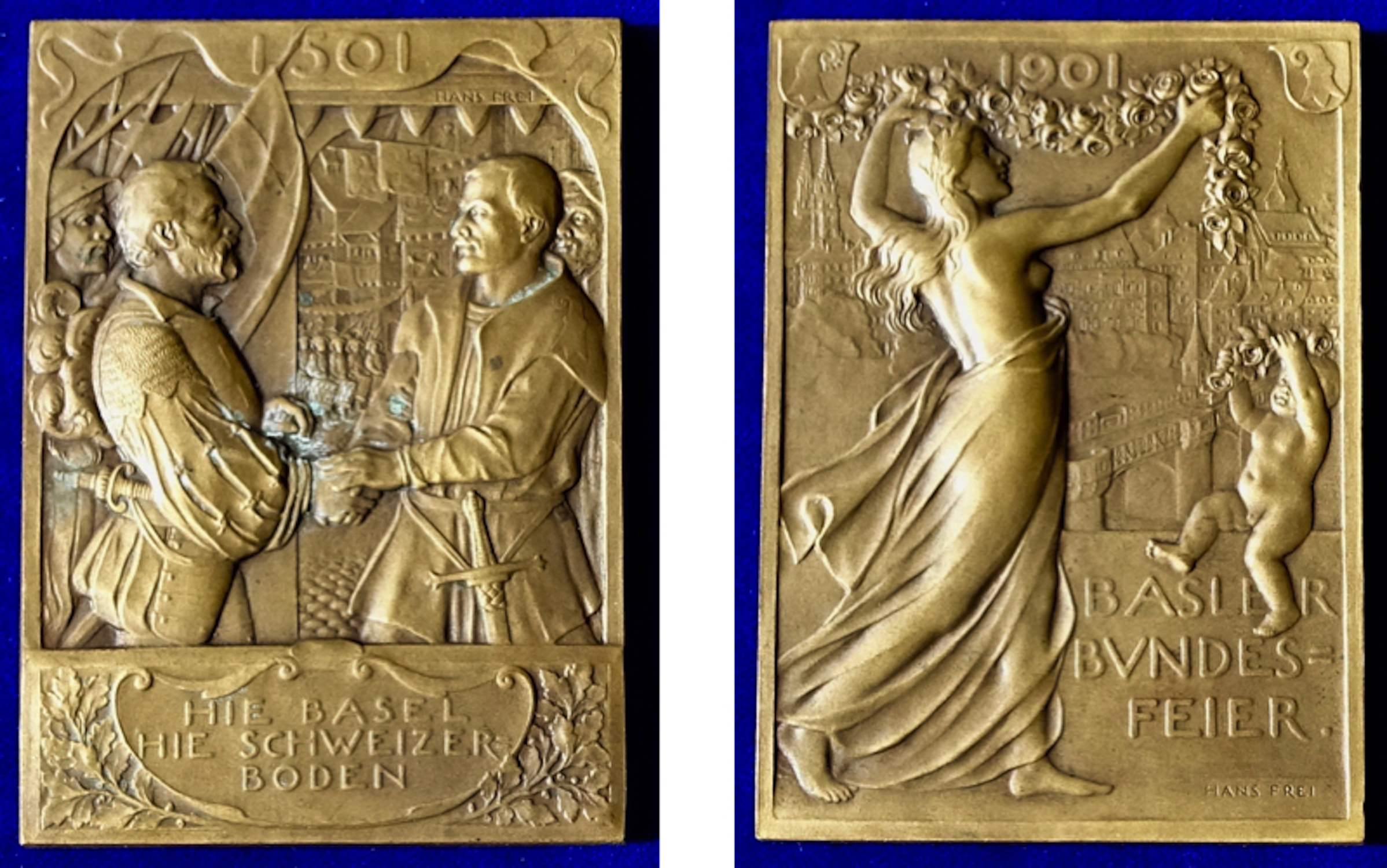
Medal by Frei commemorating the 400th anniversary of Basel joining the Swiss Confederation

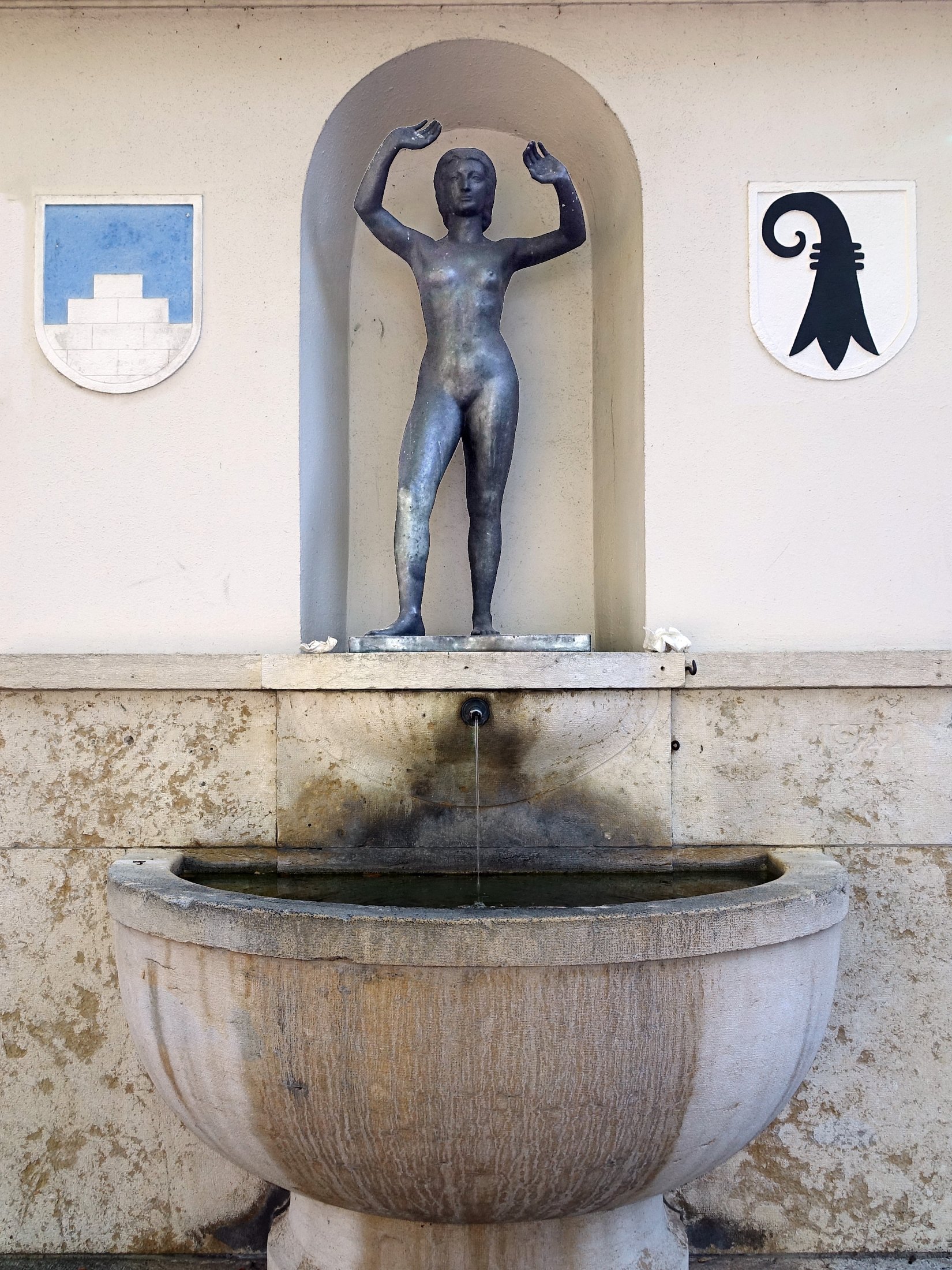
Fountain sculpture by Frei commemorating the 400th anniversary of Riehen's affiliation with Basel

Hans Frei (30 April 1868 – 14 March 1947) was a Swiss artist working primarily in medal art, engraving and sculpture. His practice was centred on medals and plaques, and extended to funerary monuments and public commemorative works.

== Biography ==
Hans Frei was born in Basel on 30 April 1868. He first trained as an engraver and took evening classes in drawing and sculptural modelling in Basel. From 1889, he spent several years studying and working outside Switzerland, including periods in Vienna, Berlin and Cologne. In 1889–1890, he also worked in Munich and Vienna as an engraver and attended Stefan Schwartz’s school for goldsmithing and chasing. In 1893, he studied at the École des arts industriels and the École des Beaux-Arts in Geneva. He continued his training in Paris from 1894 to 1896 at the École des arts décoratifs and the Académie Julian.

Frei returned to Basel in 1898, while continuing to maintain a second studio in Paris until 1908. In 1899, he married Emma Wenk of Riehen. Frei was based in Riehen from 1918. After 34 years in the Swiss Numismatic Society, he was made an honorary member in 1933. He died in Riehen on 14 March 1947.

== Work ==
Frei worked across sculpture and applied metal arts, with medals and plaques forming the centre of his practice. He produced more than 450 medals and plaques for anniversaries, public events and shooting festivals. His wider work included engraving, chased metalwork, seals, jewellery reliefs and metal reliefs for funerary and commemorative monuments.

His medals were made using both struck and cast techniques. After 1905, he developed his own casting process. His public and commemorative works included the grave monument of Albert Anker in Ins, a fountain made for the 400th anniversary of Riehen’s affiliation with Basel, and work for the Conrad Ferdinand Meyer fountain in Engelberg. Works by Frei are held in collections including the Historisches Museum Basel, the Bernisches Historisches Museum, the Swiss National Museum, the Koninklijk Penningkabinet in Leiden and the Cabinet des Médailles of the Bibliothèque nationale de France.

Frei submitted three plaques to the sculpture event of the art competitions at the 1924 Summer Olympics: Footballer, Ice skater and The winner.
