= Henri Dropsy =

French sculptor

- Born: 21 January 1885; Paris, France
- Died: 2 November 1969 (aged 84); Veneux-les-Sablons, France
- Occupation: Sculptor

Henri Dropsy (21 January 1885 – 2 November 1969) was a French sculptor and medallist. He is the son of Emile Dropsy. His work was part of the art competitions at the 1924 Summer Olympics and the 1928 Summer Olympics.
