= Amedeo Lavini =

Italian architect

- Born: 24 October 1894; Turin, Italy
- Died: 21 July 1961 (aged 66); Turin, Italy
- Occupation: Architect

Amedeo Lavini (24 October 1894 – 21 July 1961) was an Italian architect. His work was part of the architecture event in the art competition at the 1924 Summer Olympics. His father was Giuseppe Lavini, an Italian painter and art critic.
