= Nico Lansdorp =

Dutch architect

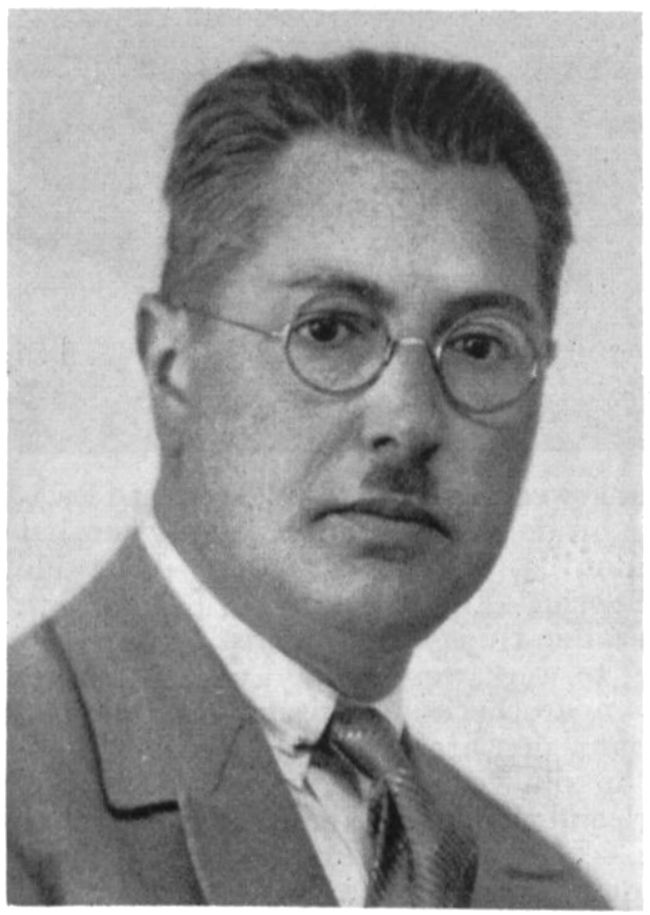
- Nico Lansdorp, 1938
- Born: 4 April 1885; Amsterdam, Netherlands
- Died: 18 January 1968 (aged 82); Haarlem, Netherlands
- Occupation: Architect

Nico Lansdorp (4 April 1885 – 18 January 1968) was a Dutch architect. His work was part of the architecture event in the art competition at the 1924 Summer Olympics.
