= Freek Engel =

Dutch painter (1872–1958)

- Born: Frederik Engel; 3 November 1872; Koog aan de Zaan, Netherlands
- Died: 8 November 1958 (aged 86); Zutphen, Netherlands
- Occupation: Painter

Frederik Engel, known as Freek Engel (3 November 1872 – 8 November 1958), was a Dutch painter.

== Biography ==
Engel was born in Koog aan de Zaan, Netherlands, the son of Jacob Engel and his wife Neeltje (née Kok). He trained at the Rijksakademie van beeldende kunsten in Amsterdam, but worked also as a photographer until about 1905, when he was able to work on painting full-time. Later in his career he moved to Zutphen, where he died. He was versatile in his choice of subjects, which included landscapes, seascapes and portraits, but is best known for his traditional landscapes, mostly with cattle, in the Dutch tradition.

His work was part of the art competitions at the 1924 Summer Olympics and the 1936 Summer Olympics.
