= Édouard Fraisse =

French sculptor

- Born: 14 May 1880; Beaune, France
- Died: 13 September 1945 (aged 65); Paris, France
- Occupation: Sculptor

Édouard Fraisse (14 May 1880 – 13 September 1945) was a French sculptor. His work was part of the art competitions at the 1924 Summer Olympics, the 1928 Summer Olympics, and the 1932 Summer Olympics.

== Biography ==
Édouard Fraisse's works are primarily inspired by sports.

He was a member of the Société des Artistes Français and exhibited at the Salon des Artistes Français, where he was awarded a gold medal in 1937. He was named a Knight of the Legion of Honor in 1929.

He Art competitions at the Summer Olympics at the 1932 Summer Olympics.
