= Henri Raphaël Moncassin =

French sculptor

- Born: 3 April 1883; Toulouse, France
- Died: 3 September 1958 (aged 75); Paris, France
- Occupation: Sculptor

Henri Raphaël Moncassin (3 April 1883 – 3 September 1958) was a French sculptor. His work was part of the art competitions at the 1924 Summer Olympics and the 1932 Summer Olympics.
