= List of Olympic medalists in art competitions =

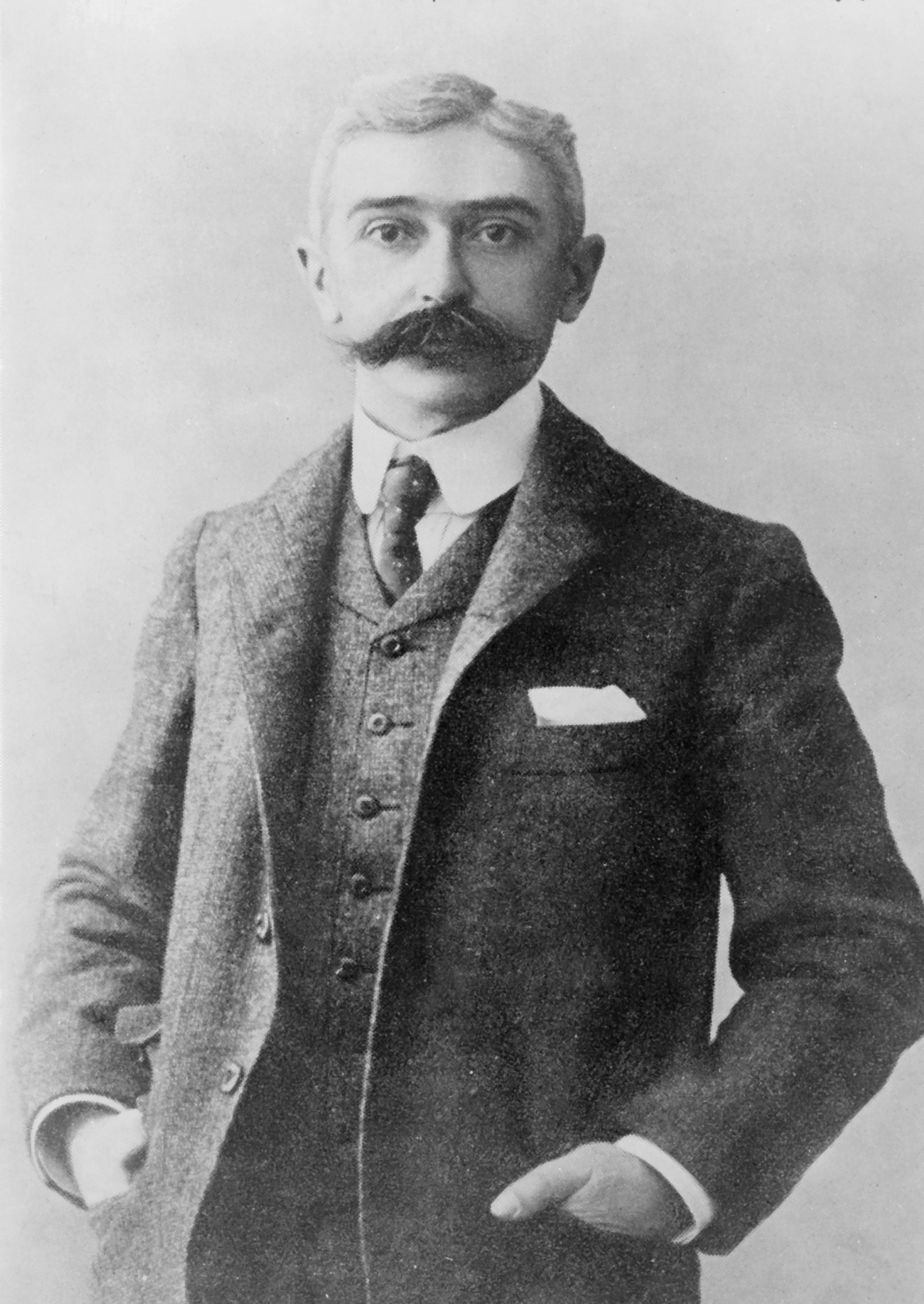
Under the pseudonyms Georges Hohrod and Martin Eschbach, IOC founder Pierre de Coubertin won a gold medal in the literature category at the 1912 Summer Olympics.

There were 146 medalists in the art competitions that were part of the Olympic Games from 1912 until 1948. These art competitions were considered an integral part of the movement by International Olympic Committee (IOC) founder Pierre de Coubertin and necessary to recapture the complete essence of the Ancient Olympic Games. Their absence before the 1912 Summer Olympics, according to journalism professor Richard Stanton, stems from Coubertin "not wanting to fragment the focus of his new and fragile movement". Art competitions were originally planned for inclusion in the 1908 Summer Olympics but were delayed after that edition's change in venue from Rome to London following the 1906 eruption of Mount Vesuvius. By the 1924 Summer Olympics they had grown to be considered internationally relevant and potentially "a milestone in advancing public awareness of art as a whole".

During their first three appearances, the art competitions were grouped into five broad categories: architecture, literature, music, painting, and sculpture. The Dutch Organizing Committee for the 1928 Summer Olympics split these into subcategories in the hopes of increasing participation. Although it was a successful strategy, the 1932 Summer Olympics eliminated several of these subcategories, which led to fewer entries in the broader categories. For the 1936 Summer Olympics, the German government proposed the addition of a film contest to the program, which was rejected.

Following a final appearance at the 1948 Summer Olympics, art competitions were removed from the Olympic program. Planners of the 1952 Summer Olympics opposed their inclusion on logistical grounds, claiming that the lack of an international association for the event meant that the entire onus of facilitation was placed on the local organizing committee. Concerns were also raised about the professionalism of the event, since only amateurs were allowed to participate in the sporting tournaments, and the growing commercialization of the competitions, as artists had been permitted to sell their submissions during the course of the Games since 1928. In 1952 an art festival and exhibition was held concurrent with the Games, a tradition that has been maintained in all subsequent Summer Olympics.

In 1952, art competition medals were removed from the official national medal counts. The IOC does not track medalists in Olympic art competitions in its database and thus the prize winners are only officially recorded in the original Olympic reports. Judges were not required to distribute first, second, and third place awards for every category, and thus certain events lack medalists in these placements. Since participants were allowed multiple submissions, it was also possible for artists to win more than one in a single event, as Alex Diggelmann of Switzerland did in the graphic arts category of the 1948 edition. Diggelmann is tied with Denmark's Josef Petersen, who won second prize three times in literature, for the number of medals captured in the art competitions. Luxembourg's Jean Jacoby is the only individual to win two gold medals, doing so in painting in 1924 and 1928. Of the 146 medalists, 11 were women and only Finnish author Aale Tynni was awarded gold. Germany was the most successful nation, with eight gold, seven silver, and nine bronze medals, although one was won by Coubertin himself, a Frenchman. He submitted his poem Ode to Sport under the pseudonyms Georges Hohrod and Martin Eschbach, as if it were a joint-entry, and won first prize in the 1912 literature category. The original report credits this medal to Germany. Two individuals, Walter W. Winans and Alfréd Hajós, won medals in both athletic and art competitions.

== Architecture ==
=== Mixed architecture ===
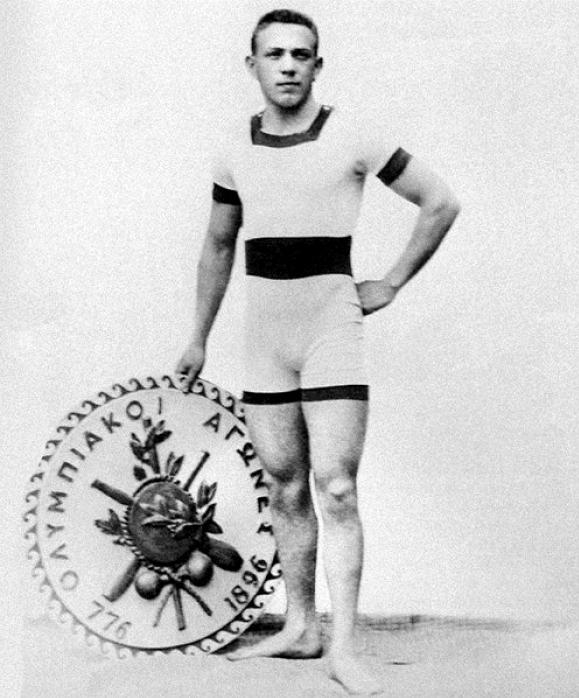
Alfréd Hajós was one of two individuals to win medals in sport and art competitions.

Olympic medalists in mixed architecture
Games	Gold	Silver	Bronze
1912 Stockholm	Eugène-Edouard Monod & Alphonse Laverrière (SUI); Building-plan of a modern Stadium	none awarded	none awarded
1920 Antwerp	none awarded	Holger Sinding-Larsen (NOR); Project pour une Ecole de Gymnastique	none awarded
1924 Paris	none awarded	Alfréd Hajós & Dezső Lauber (HUN); Plan d'un Stade	Julien Médecin (MON); Stade pour Monte-Carlo

=== Mixed architecture, architectural designs ===
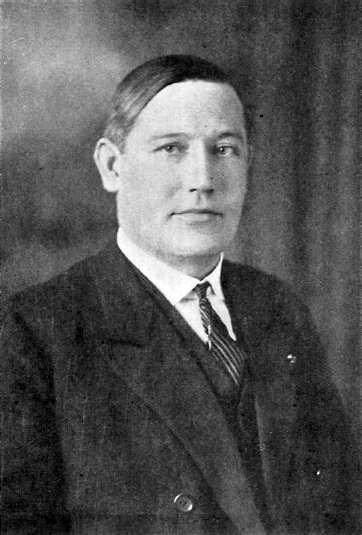
Jan Wils, 1928 gold medalist in architectural designs

Olympic medalists in mixed architecture, architectural designs
Games	Gold	Silver	Bronze
1928 Amsterdam	Jan Wils (NED); Olympic Stadium in Amsterdam	Ejnar Mindedal Rasmussen (DEN); Swimming pool at Ollerup	Jacques Lambert (FRA); Stadium at Versailles
1932 Los Angeles	Gustave Saacké, Pierre Bailly, & Pierre Montenot (FRA); Design for a "Cirque pour Toros"	John Russell Pope (USA); Design for the Payne Whitney Gymnasium, New Haven, Conn.	Richard Konwiarz (GER); Design for a "Schlesierkampfbahn" in the Sport Park of Breslau
1936 Berlin	Hermann Kutschera (AUT); Skiing Stadium	Werner March (GER); Reich Sport Field	Hermann Stiegholzer & Herbert Kastinger (AUT); Sporting Center in Vienna
1948 London	Adolf Hoch (AUT); Skisprungschanze auf dem Kobenzl	Alfred Rinesch (AUT); Watersports Centre in Carinthia	Nils Olsson (SWE); Baths and Sporting Hall for Gothenburg

=== Town planning ===
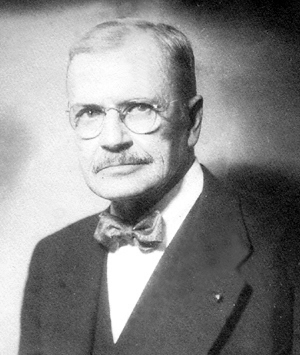
Charles Downing Lay, 1936 silver medalist in designs for municipal planning

Olympic medalists in town planning
Games	Gold	Silver	Bronze
1928 Amsterdam	Alfred Hensel (GER); Stadium at Nuremberg	Jacques Lambert (FRA); Stadium at Versailles	Max Laeuger (GER); Municipal park at Hamburg
1932 Los Angeles	John Hughes (GBR); Design for a Sports and Recreation Center with Stadium, for the City of Liverpool	Jens Klemmensen (DEN); Design for a Stadium and Public Park	André Verbeke (BEL); Design for a "Maraton Park"
1936 Berlin	Werner March & Walter March (GER); Reich Sport Field	Charles Downing Lay (USA); Marine Park, Brooklyn	Theo Nussbaum (GER); Municipal Planning and Sporting Centre in Cologne
1948 London	Yrjö Lindegren (FIN); The Centre of Athletics in Varkaus, Finland.	Werner Schindler & Edy Knupfer (SUI); Swiss Federal Sports and Gymnastics Training Centre	Ilmari Niemeläinen (FIN); The Athletic Centre in Kemi, Finland.

== Literature ==
=== Mixed literature ===
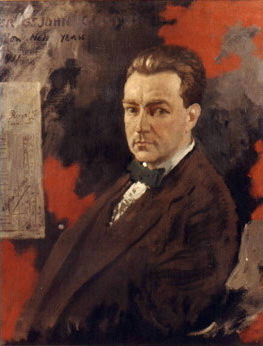
Oliver St. John Gogarty, 1924 bronze medalist in literature

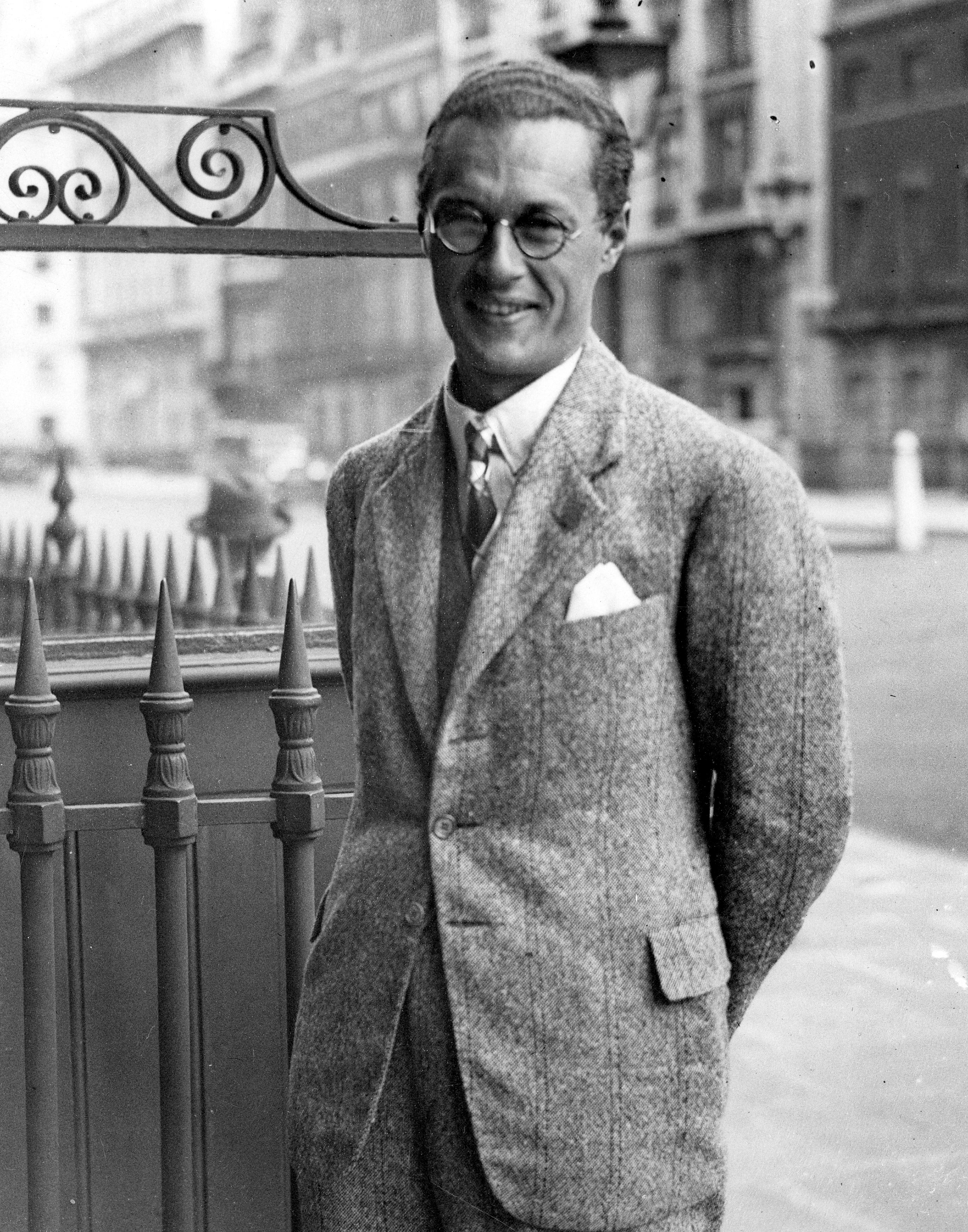
Kazimierz Wierzyński, 1928 gold medalist in lyric and speculative works

Olympic medalists in mixed literature
Games	Gold	Silver	Bronze
1912 Stockholm	Georges Hohrod & Martin Eschbath (GER) (Note: Pierre de Coubertin's entry in Literature, Ode to sport, at the 1912 Summer Olympics was submitted by the pseudonym of "Georges Hohrod" and "Martin Eschbach" from Germany, even though he is French. Despite the subsequent resolving of his identity, the gold medal is officially still awarded and attributed to Germany, according to the pseudonym and the country under which the work was submitted.); Ode to sport	none awarded	none awarded
1920 Antwerp	Raniero Nicolai (ITA); Canzoni Olimpioniche	Theodore Andrea Cook (GBR); Olympic Games of Antwerp	Maurice Bladel (BEL); La Louange des Dieux
1924 Paris	Géo-Charles (FRA); Jeux Olympiques	Margaret Stuart (GBR); Sword Songs	Charles Gonnet (FRA); Vers le Dieu d’Olympie
1924 Paris	Géo-Charles (FRA); Jeux Olympiques	Josef Petersen (DEN); Euryale	Oliver St. John Gogarty (IRL); Ode pour les Jeux de Tailteann
1932 Los Angeles	Paul Bauer (GER); Am Kangehenzonga	Josef Petersen (DEN); The Argonauts	none awarded

=== Dramatic works ===
Olympic medalists in dramatic works
Games	Gold	Silver	Bronze
1928 Amsterdam	none awarded	Lauro De Bosis (ITA); Icaro	none awarded

=== Epic works ===
Olympic medalists in epic works
Games	Gold	Silver	Bronze
1928 Amsterdam	Ferenc Mező (HUN); L’histoire des Jeux Olympiques	Ernst Weiss (GER); Boetius von Orlamünde	Carel Scharten & Margo Scharten-Antink (NED); De Nar uit de Maremmen
1936 Berlin	Urho Karhumäki (FIN); Avoveteen	Wilhelm Ehmer (GER); For the Top of the World	Jan Parandowski (POL); Dysk Olimijski
1948 London	Giani Stuparich (ITA); La Grotta	Josef Petersen (DEN); The Olympic Champion	Éva Földes (HUN); The Well of Youth

=== Lyric and speculative works ===
Olympic medalists in lyric and speculative works
Games	Gold	Silver	Bronze
1928 Amsterdam	Kazimierz Wierzyński (POL); Laur Olimpijski	Rudolf G. Binding (GER); Reitvorschrift fur eine Geliebte	Johannes Weltzer (DEN); Symphonia Heroïca
1936 Berlin	Felix Dhünen-Sondinger (GER); The Runner	Bruno Fattori (ITA); Profili Azzuri	Hans Stoiber (AUT); The Discus
1948 London	Aale Tynni (FIN); Laurel of Hellas	Ernst van Heerden (RSA); Six Poems	Gilbert Prouteau (FRA); Rythme du Stade

== Music ==
=== Mixed music ===
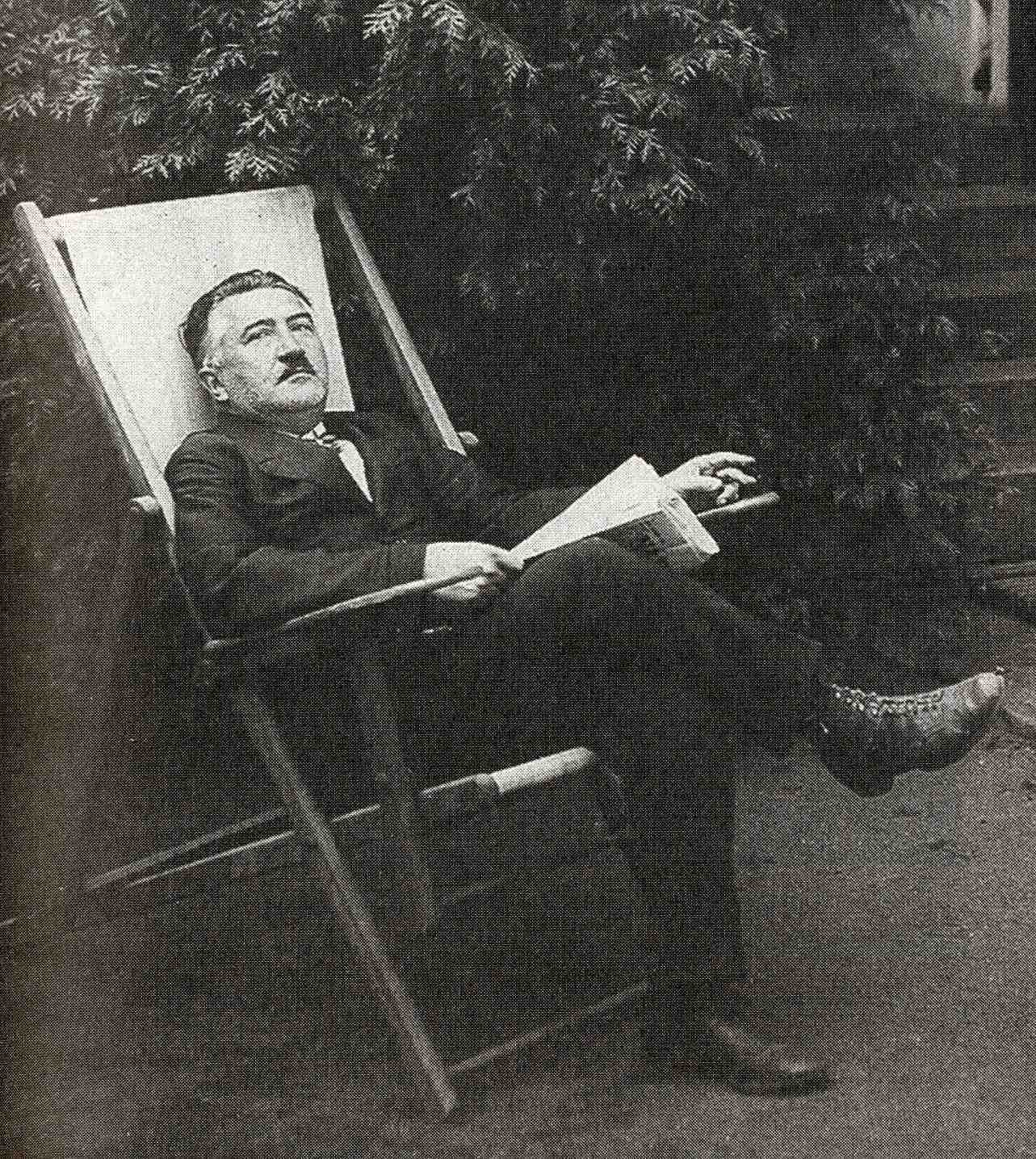
Josef Suk, 1932 silver medalist in music

Olympic medalists in mixed music
Games	Gold	Silver	Bronze
1912 Stockholm	Riccardo Barthelemy (ITA); Triumphal March	none awarded	none awarded
1920 Antwerp	Georges Monier (BEL); Olympique	Oreste Riva (ITA); Epinicion	none awarded
1932 Los Angeles	none awarded	Josef Suk (TCH); Into a New Life	none awarded

=== Compositions for orchestra ===
Olympic medalists in compositions for orchestra
Games	Gold	Silver	Bronze
1928 Amsterdam	none awarded	none awarded	Rudolph Simonsen (DEN); Symphony No. 2 "Hellas"
1936 Berlin	Werner Egk (GER); Olympic Festive Music	Lino Liviabella (ITA); The Victor	Jaroslav Křička (TCH); Mountain Suite
1948 London	Zbigniew Turski (POL); Olympic Symphony	Kalervo Tuukkanen (FIN); Karhunpyynti	Erling Brene (DEN); Vigueur

=== Solo and chorus compositions ===
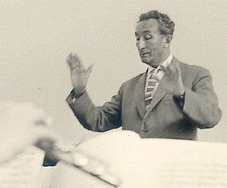
Kurt Thomas, 1936 silver medalist in solo and chorus compositions

Olympic medalists in solo and chorus compositions
Games	Gold	Silver	Bronze
1936 Berlin	Paul Höffer (GER); Olympic Vow	Kurt Thomas (GER); Olympic Cantata, 1936	Harald Genzmer (GER); The Runner

=== Instrumental and chamber ===
Olympic medalists in the instrumental and chamber event
Games	Gold	Silver	Bronze
1948 London	none awarded	John Jacob Weinzweig (CAN); Divertimenti for Solo Flute and Strings	Sergio Lauricella (ITA); Toccata per Pianoforte

=== Vocal ===
Olympic medalists in the vocal event
Games	Gold	Silver	Bronze
1948 London	none awarded	none awarded	Gabriele Bianchi (ITA); Inno Olimpionico

== Painting ==
=== Mixed painting ===
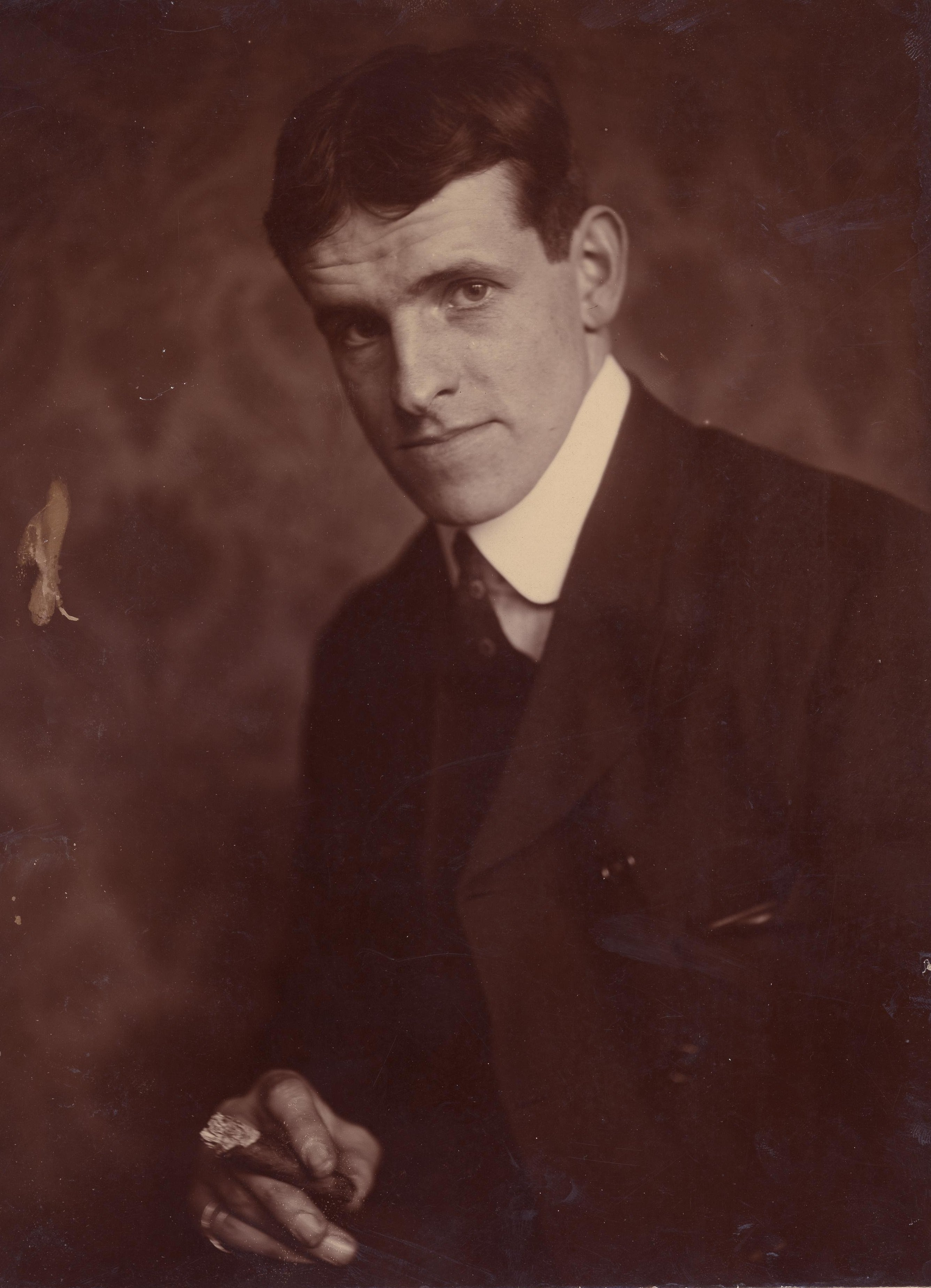
Jack Butler Yeats, 1924 silver medalist in painting

Olympic medalists in mixed painting
Games	Gold	Silver	Bronze
1912 Stockholm	Carlo Pellegrini (ITA); Winter Sports	none awarded	none awarded
1920 Antwerp	none awarded	Henriette Brossin de Mère-de Polanska (FRA); L'Elan	Alfred Ost (BEL); Joueur de Football
1924 Paris	Jean Jacoby (LUX); Etude de Sport	Jack Butler Yeats (IRL); Natation	Johan van Hell (NED); Patineurs

=== Drawings and water colors ===
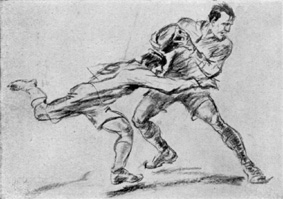
Rugby by Jean Jacoby, the winning entry in the 1928 drawings category

Olympic medalists in drawing and water colors
Games	Gold	Silver	Bronze
1928 Amsterdam	Jean Jacoby (LUX); Rugby	Alex Virot (FRA); Gestes de Football	Władysław Skoczylas (POL); Posters
1932 Los Angeles	Lee Blair (USA); Rodeo	Percy Crosby (USA); Jackknife	Gerhard Westermann (NED); Horseman
1936 Berlin	none awarded	Romano Dazzi (ITA); Four Sketches for Frescoes	Sujaku Suzuki (JPN); Classical Horse Racing in Japan

=== Engravings and etchings ===
Olympic medalists in engravings and etchings
Games	Gold	Silver	Bronze
1948 London	Albert Decaris (FRA); Swimming Pool	John Copley (GBR); Polo Players	Walter Battiss (RSA); Seaside Sport

=== Graphic works ===
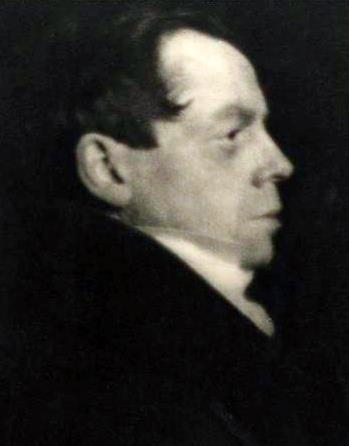
William Nicholson, 1928 gold medalist in graphic works

Olympic medalists in graphic works
Games	Gold	Silver	Bronze
1928 Amsterdam	William Nicholson (GBR); Un Almanach de douze Sports	Carl Moos (SUI); Posters	Max Feldbauer (GER); Mailcoach
1932 Los Angeles	Joseph Golinkin (USA); Leg Scissors	Janina Konarska (POL); Stadium	Joachim Karsch (GER); Stabwechsel
1936 Berlin	Alex Diggelmann (SUI); Arosa I Placard	Alfred Hierl (GER); International Automobile Race on the Avis	Stanisław Ostoja-Chrostowski (POL); Yachting Club Certificate
1948 London	none awarded	Alex Diggelmann (SUI); World Championship for Cycling Poster	Alex Diggelmann (SUI); World Championship for Ice Hockey Poster

=== Paintings ===
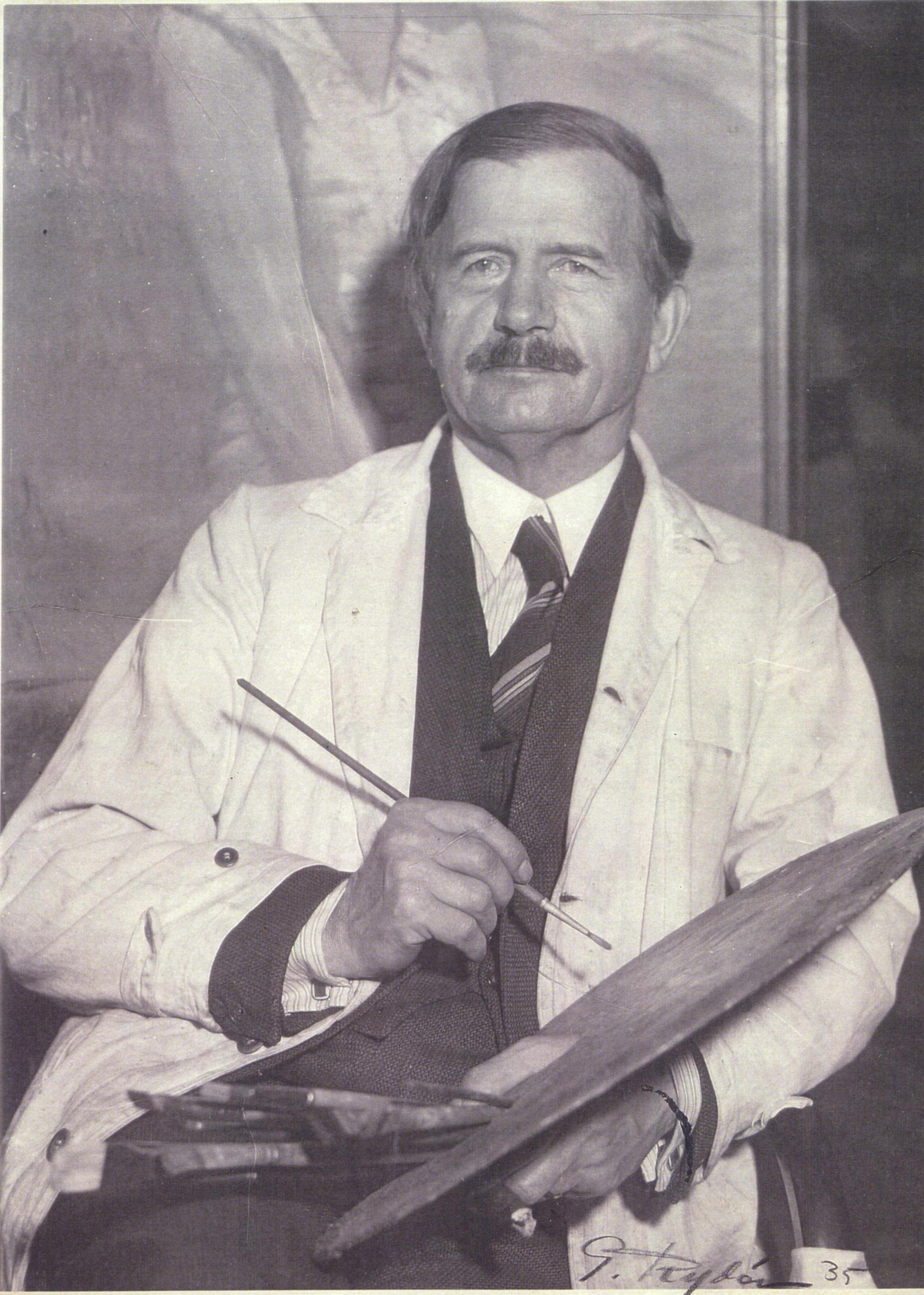
David Wallin, 1932 gold medalist in painting

Olympic medalists in paintings
Games	Gold	Silver	Bronze
1928 Amsterdam	Isaac Israëls (NED); Cavalier Rouge	Laura Knight (GBR); Boxeurs	Walther Klemm (GER); Patinage
1932 Los Angeles	David Wallin (SWE); At the Seaside of Arild	Ruth Miller (USA); Struggle	none awarded
1936 Berlin	none awarded	Rudolf Eisenmenger (AUT); Runner at the Finishing Line	Ryuji Fujita (JPN); Ice Hockey
1948 London	Alfred Thomson (GBR); London Amateur Championships	Giovanni Stradone (ITA); Le Pistard	Letitia Marion Hamilton (IRL); Meath Hunt Point-to-Point Races

== Sculpturing ==
=== Mixed sculpturing ===
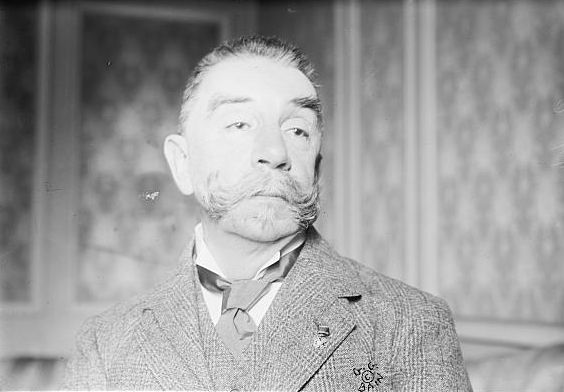
Walter W. Winans was one of two individuals to win medals in sport and art competitions.

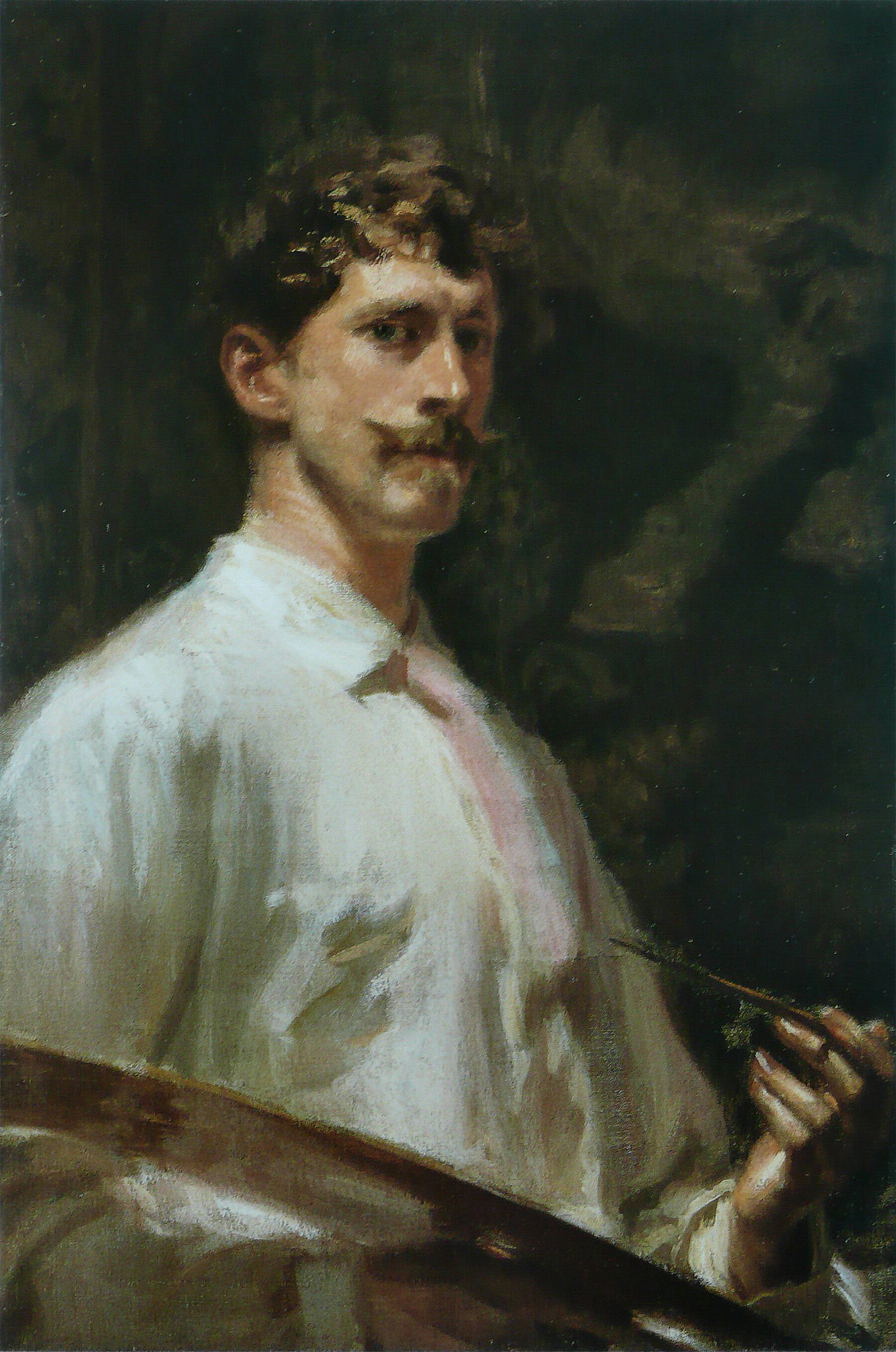
Frederick William MacMonnies, 1932 silver medalist in medals and reliefs

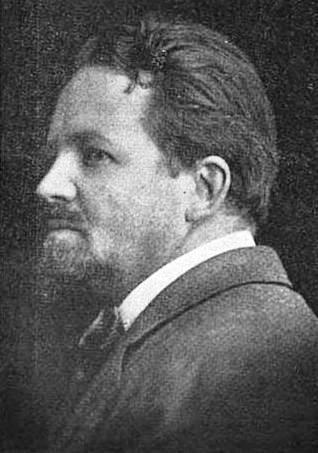
Mahonri Young, 1932 gold medalist in statues

Olympic medalists in mixed sculpturing
Games	Gold	Silver	Bronze
1912 Stockholm	Walter W. Winans (USA); An American trotter	Georges Dubois (FRA); Model of the entrance to a modern Stadium	none awarded
1920 Antwerp	Albéric Collin (BEL); La Force	Simon Goossens (BEL); Les Patineurs	Alphons De Cuyper (BEL); Lanceur de Poids et Coureur
1924 Paris	Konstantinos Dimitriadis (GRE); Discobole Finlandais	Frantz Heldenstein (LUX); Vers l'olympiade	Jean René Gauguin (DEN); Le Boxeur
1924 Paris	Konstantinos Dimitriadis (GRE); Discobole Finlandais	Frantz Heldenstein (LUX); Vers l'olympiade	Claude-Léon Mascaux (FRA); Cadre de Medailles

=== Medals ===
Olympic medalists in medals
Games	Gold	Silver	Bronze
1936 Berlin	none awarded	Luciano Mercante (ITA); Medals	Josue Dupon (BEL); Equestrian Medals

=== Medals and plaques ===
Olympic medalists in medals and plaques
Games	Gold	Silver	Bronze
1948 London	none awarded	Oskar Thiede (AUT); Eight Sports Plaques	Edwin Grienauer (AUT); Prize Rowing Trophy

=== Reliefs and medallions ===
Olympic medalists in reliefs and medallions
Games	Gold	Silver	Bronze
1928 Amsterdam	Edwin Grienauer (AUT); Médailles	Chris van der Hoef (NED); Médaille pour les Jeux Olympiques	Edwin Scharff (GER); Plaquette
1932 Los Angeles	Józef Klukowski (POL); Sport Sculpture II	Frederick William MacMonnies (USA); Lindbergh Medal	R. Tait McKenzie (CAN); Shield of the Athletes

=== Reliefs ===
Olympic medalists in reliefs
Games	Gold	Silver	Bronze
1936 Berlin	Emil Sutor (GER); Hurdlers	Józef Klukowski (POL); Ball	none awarded
1948 London	none awarded	none awarded	Rosamund Fletcher (GBR); The End of the Covert

=== Statues ===
Olympic medalists in statues
Games	Gold	Silver	Bronze
1928 Amsterdam	Paul Landowski (FRA); Boxer	Milo Martin (SUI); Athlète au repos	Renée Sintenis (GER); Footballeur
1932 Los Angeles	Mahonri Young (USA); The Knockdown	Miltiades Manno (HUN); Wrestling	Jakub Obrovský (TCH); Odysseus
1936 Berlin	Farpi Vignoli (ITA); Sulky Driver	Arno Breker (GER); Decathlon Athlete	Stig Blomberg (SWE); Wrestling Youths
1948 London	Gustaf Nordahl (SWE); Homage to Ling	Chintamoni Kar (GBR); The Stag	Hubert Yencesse (FRA); Nageuse

== Statistics ==
=== Multiple medalists ===
Multiple medalists in Olympic art competitions
Athlete	Nation	Olympics	Gold	Silver	Bronze	Total
Alex Diggelmann	Switzerland	1936–1948	1	1	1	3
Josef Petersen	Denmark	1924, 1932, 1948	0	3	0	3
Jean Jacoby	Luxembourg	1924–1936	2	0	0	2
Józef Klukowski	Poland	1932–1936	1	1	0	2
Werner March	Germany	1928–1936	1	1	0	2
Edwin Grienauer	Austria	1928, 1948	1	0	1	2
Jacques Lambert	France	1928	0	1	1	2

=== Medals per year ===
Medals won by country by year
Nation	1912	1920	1924	1928	1932	1936	1948	Total
Austria	–	–	–	1	–	4	4	9
Belgium	–	6	–	–	1	1	–	8
Canada	–	–	–	–	1	–	1	2
Denmark	–	–	2	3	2	–	2	9
Finland	–	–	–	–	–	1	4	5
France	1	1	3	4	1	–	3	13
Great Britain	–	1	1	2	1	–	4	9
Germany	1	–	–	8	3	12	–	24
Greece	–	–	1	–	–	–	–	1
Hungary	–	–	1	1	1	–	1	4
Ireland	–	–	2	–	–	–	1	3
Italy	2	2	–	1	–	5	4	14
Japan	–	–	–	–	–	2	–	2
Luxembourg	–	–	2	1	–	–	–	3
Monaco	–	–	1	–	–	–	–	1
Netherlands	–	–	1	4	1	–	–	6
Norway	–	1	–	–	–	–	–	1
Poland	–	–	–	2	2	3	1	8
South Africa	–	–	–	–	–	–	2	2
Switzerland	1	–	–	2	–	1	3	7
Sweden	–	–	–	–	1	1	2	4
Czechoslovakia	–	–	–	–	2	1	–	3
United States	1	–	–	–	7	1	–	9
