= Kazimierz Wierzyński =

Polish poet and journalist (1894–1969)

Medal record

Art competitions
Gold medal – first place	1928 Amsterdam	Lyric

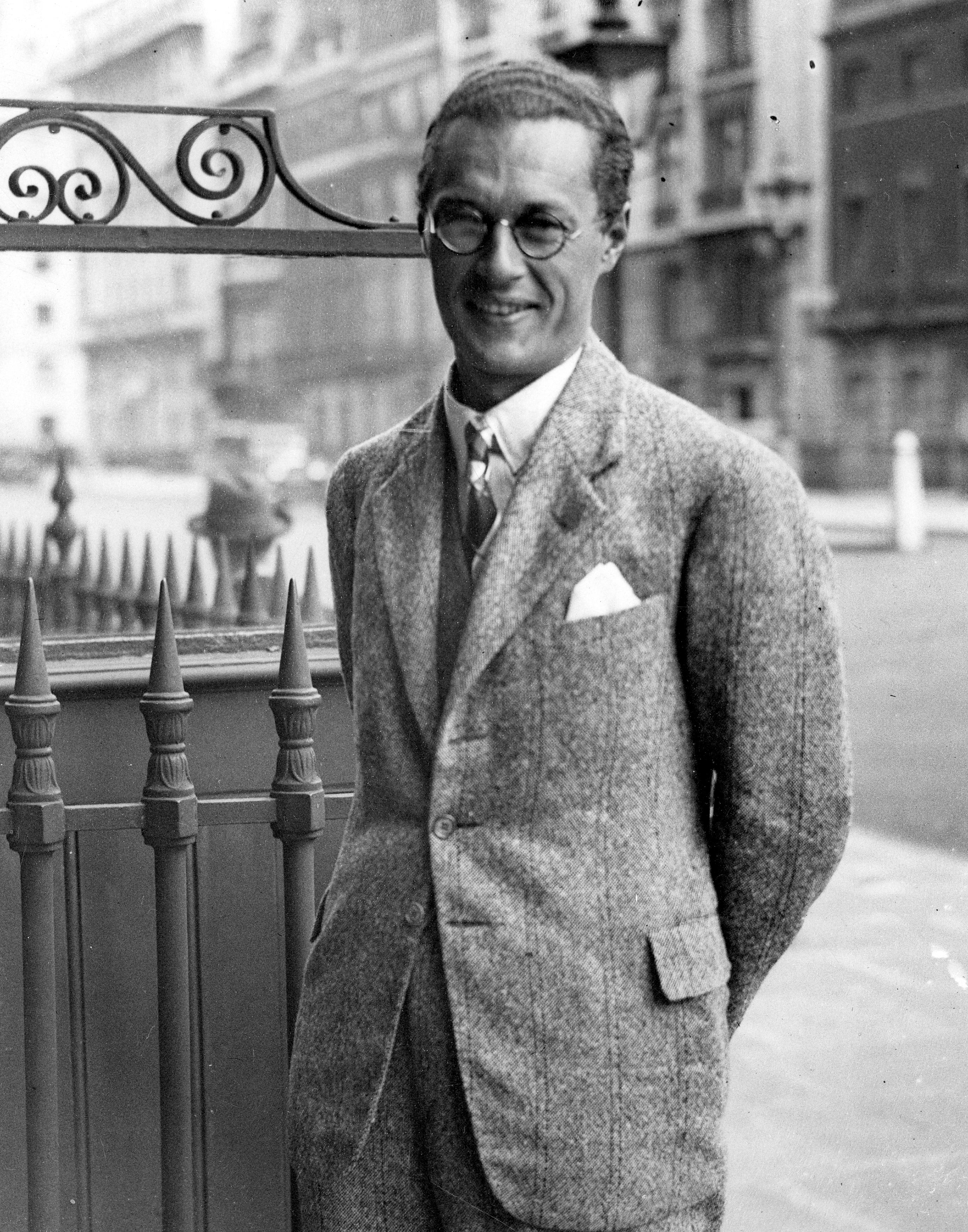
Kazimierz Wierzyński, 1928

Kazimierz Wierzyński (Drohobycz, Kingdom of Galicia and Lodomeria, 27 August 1894 – 13 February 1969, London) was a Polish poet and journalist; an elected member of the prestigious Polish Academy of Literature in the Second Polish Republic.

== Life ==
Kazimierz Wierzyński was born in Drohobycz (Drohobych), Kingdom of Galicia and Lodomeria. He was a co-founder, with Julian Tuwim and three other poets, of the Skamander group of experimental poets. His work Olympic Laurel (Polish: Laur olimpijski, 1927), which idealizes the grace and fitness of athletes, won the gold medal for poetry at the 1928 Olympic Games in Amsterdam, and his other early poems also celebrate the joy of living.

In September 1939, after the invasion of Poland by Nazi Germany, Wierzyński and his wife Helena escaped from Poland and, via Romania, Yugoslavia, Italy, and France, eventually reached the USA, where they stayed for almost twenty years.

His later works, written in exile, are more somber and socially conscious. The Bitter Crop (1933) includes poems about the United States. His Forgotten Battlefield (1944) contains narratives of World War II. He died in London, England.

== See also ==
- List of Poles
