= Stadion am Zoo =

Football stadium in Wuppertal, Germany

Coordinates: 51°14′20.7″N 7°6′18.3″E

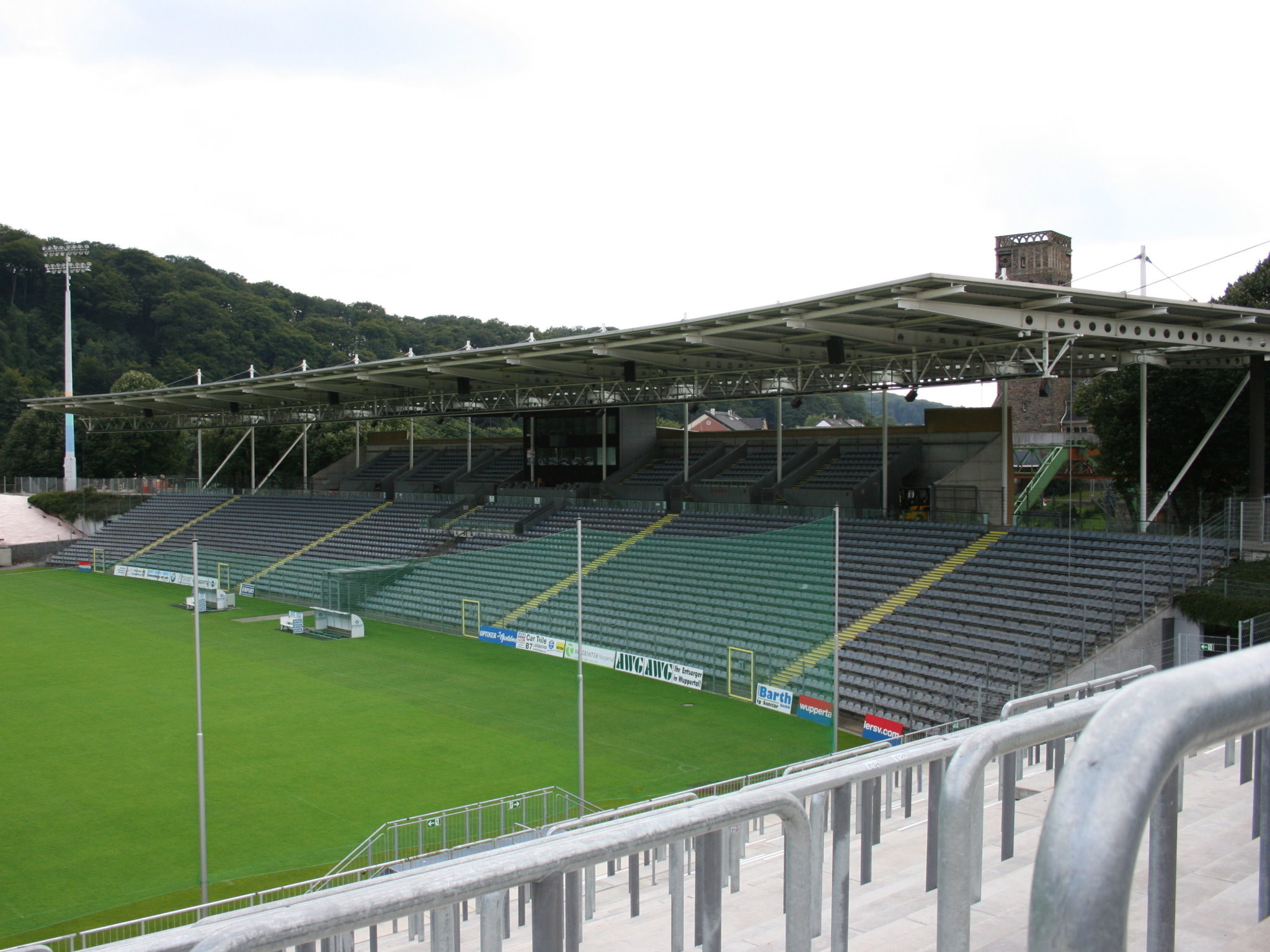
- Interactive map of Stadion am Zoo
- Location: Wuppertal, NRW
- Capacity: 23,067

Construction
- Opened: 1924
- Renovated: 1993; 2005 – April 2008
- Architects: Willkens & Nußbaum

Tenant
- Wuppertaler SV

The Stadion am Zoo is a multi-purpose stadium in Wuppertal, Germany. It is currently used mostly for football matches and hosts the home matches of Wuppertaler SV. The stadium is able to hold 23,067 people and was built in 1924.
