= List of LGBTQ artists at the Olympic Games =

There are 26 (Note: Based on the information collected on this page) Olympic artists who have identified or been identified as lesbian, gay, bisexual, queer, and/or androgynous, or who had been in a same-sex relationship. The first Olympic Games in which an artist now known to be LGBT+ competed was the 1924 Summer Olympics, with the first LGBT+ Olympic medalist in art winning in 1928. The artistic events were not contested after 1948.

Not including demonstration events, 5 of the LGBT+ artists won a medal, with another receiving an honourable mention but no medals (24% of LGBT+ artists). None won a gold medal. (Note: Harald Kreutzberg and Mary Wigman received medals in the competition part of the 1936 dance event. As a demonstration event, these are not counted.)

== Overview ==
All based on the List of LGBT artists at the Olympic Games

By country
Country	Number of Olympians		
Country	F	M	Total
France	–	1	1
Germany (Note: Including Weimar Republic and Nazi Germany)	3	3	6
Great Britain	–	3	3
Ireland (Note: Including Irish Free State)	1	—	1
Italy (Note: Including Kingdom of Italy and Fascist Italy)	–	1	1
Mexico	—	1	1
Poland	—	2	2
South Africa (Note: Including Union of South Africa)	–	3	3
United States	5	3	8

By year
Games	Number of Olympians (Note: Including multi-year appearances of the same Olympian.)		
Games	F	M	Total
1924 Summer	—	4	4
1928 Summer	4	3	7
1932 Summer	4	4	8
1936 Summer	2	3	5
1948 Summer	—	5	5

By art
Art	Number of Olympians by gender (Note: Including multi-disciplinary Olympians)		
Art	Female	Male	Total
Epic Literature	—	1	1
Dance (Note: Demonstration event)	1	1	2
Drawings and water colours (Painting)	—	2	2
Graphic arts	—	2	2
Literature (Open)	—	2	2
Lyric works (Literature)	—	2	2
Painting	1	6	7
Sculpting (Open)	2	2	4
Statue sculpting	5	1	6

== LGBTQ artists ==
Tables are default sorted by first Games appearance chronologically, then current surname or common nickname alphabetically, then first name alphabetically. They can be sorted by current surname (where used) or common nickname alphabetically; by country and event alphabetically; by Games chronologically; (Note: Where artists have represented multiple countries, competed in multiple events, and/or at multiple Games, the country/event/Games they are sorted by is their first country/event/Games chronologically.) and by medals as organised in Olympics medals tables. (Note: Based on most golds over total medals, then alphabetically by current surname or common nickname. In cases of medals for demonstration events and honourable mentions, these are sorted between one bronze and no medals.)

Artist	Country	Category	Games	Medal(s)	Notes
Fanie Eloff	Union of South Africa	Sculpture	1924		Eloff's sexuality was made public after his contribution to the Games, when his series of sculptures of nude male dancers led to outcry, further inspection, and then his shunning from South African society.
Vincenzo Gemito	Fascist Italy	Sculpture	1924		Gemito was known to be gay among fellow artists from his early days, and the homoeroticism in his drawings supposedly made it obvious to everyone else. Between being an orphan denied of a heteronormative family, and his growing prominence in society from his success in sculpting, he attempted to steer his personal and professional circles to appear straight; doing so reportedly drove him insane, and he spent two decades in and out of asylums before being finally released in 1909. Unlike his partner Antonio Mancini, who had also been sent to an asylum, Gemito managed to have a career after his release, though it was made clear that he could no longer create homosexual art if he wished to be prominent. At the 1924 Games, he entered seven pieces into the sculpture competition and was also a judge of it; none of his pieces placed.
Robert Graves	Great Britain	Literature	1924		Graves was openly bisexual, having intense relationships with men and (often masculine) women. In the 1920s, he lived in polyamorous groups. In his 1929 autobiography, Good-Bye to All That, he described himself as "pseudo-homosexual", and suggested that all-male public schools were the cause. His father-in-law, William Nicholson, was a 1928 gold medalist in graphic arts.
Henry de Montherlant	France	Literature	1924		Montherlant was said to have kept his homosexuality a secret during his life, despite a same-sex relationship in his youth leading to his expulsion from his Catholic school, and this incident being dramatised by Montherlant himself as the play La Ville dont le prince est un enfant. He also detailed his homosexual interests in a long-withheld autobiography.
Arno Breker	Germany (Weimar Republic) / Nazi Germany	Sculpture	1928, 1936	2nd place, silver medalist(s)	Originally labelled Degenerate, Breker came to be Hitler's favourite sculptor; the Nazi state sculptor; and one of the select artists on the Gottbegnadeten list. His 1936 silver medal-winning statue of a decathlete still stands outside the Olympiastadion. Breker's art, predominantly male nude sculptures, was used by the Nazis to propagate the concept of German physical superiority, despite the statues being greatly homoerotic and the Nazi official stance against homosexuality. His artwork not produced for the Nazis comprised many busts of other gay artists, including Jean Cocteau, a close friend, who wrote that Hitler saw Breker as a son. Breker was reportedly closeted. After World War II, he rejected Nazism.
Ludwig von Hofmann	Germany (Weimar Republic)	Painting and graphic art	1928		Considered iconic of homosexual artists of his time, Hofmann married a female cousin and so may have been bisexual.
Anna Hyatt Huntington	United States	Sculpture	1928		For some time lived with Brenda Putnam.
Mainie Jellett	(Republic of Ireland) Irish Free State	Painting and graphic art	1928		Jellett's relationship with Evie Hone was dramatised in the 2020 play Female Nude Seated.
Janet Scudder	United States	Sculpture	1928		Scudder lived the last years of her life with her female partner. She had been good friends with Gertrude Stein and Alice B. Toklas.
Renée Sintenis	Germany (Weimar Republic)	Sculpture	1928, 1932	3rd place, bronze medalist(s)	Sintenis won the bronze medal in the 1928 statue sculpting competition. Best known for creating the Golden Bear, she was a popular socialite in inter-war Europe and famous for her androgyny; for this and her Jewish heritage, she was persecuted under the Nazi regime. Art scholar Nina Lübbren has suggested that Sintenis may have consciously performed masculine gender to be accepted as a sculptor, though it is typically acknowledged that androgynous gender was part of the Neue Frau ideal Sintenis embodied. Scholar Kocku von Stuckrad wrote that Sintenis "playfully evaded prescribed gender roles." She married artist Emil Rudolf Weiß and, after his sudden death, had a lifelong relationship with a woman, Magdalena Goldmann. Sintenis and Weiß rarely collaborated, most famously doing so to produce drawings and typeface, respectively, for a collection of Sappho poetry. Weiß is said to have "tolerated" Sintenis' queerness later in their marriage. He also entered the 1928 Olympics. Julie Nero wrote that Sintenis avoided depicting gender, even in her sculptures of athletes (one of which won her the Olympic medal), due to her identity.
Ángel Zárraga	Mexico	Painting and graphic art	1928, 1932		
Thomas Eakins	United States	Painting and graphic art	1932		Art scholarship debates whether Thomas Eakins and Winslow Homer, whose artwork is often discussed together, identified as homosexual. William S. McFeely wrote that, amidst the debate, there is little doubt that Eakins was attracted to men. Eakins and Homer both died before their work was submitted to the Olympics, and as such it was not considered officially in competition.
Beatrice Fenton	United States	Sculpture	1932		
Harriet Whitney Frishmuth	United States	Sculpture	1932		While Frishmuth was not open about her sexuality in press interviews of the day, archival records document that she was a lesbian, her partner Ruth Talcott having lived with her from the 1940s until Frishmuth's death in 1980.
Winslow Homer	United States	Painting and graphic art	1932		Art scholarship debates whether Thomas Eakins and Winslow Homer, whose artwork is often discussed together, identified as homosexual. Debate continues as to Homer's sexuality and academic tendencies to not acknowledge it (likened to Michelangelo), with scholar Philip Beam suggesting that Homer simply was not interested in relationships. Eakins and Homer both died before their work was submitted to the Olympics, and as such it was not considered officially in competition.
Brenda Putnam	United States	Sculpture	1932		For some time lived with Anna Hyatt Huntington.
Carl Sprinchorn	United States	Painting and graphic art	1932		
Harald Kreutzberg	Nazi Germany	Dance	1936		Harald Kreutzberg and Mary Wigman competed in the dance demonstration event, winning medals. Kreutzberg was openly gay and had "androgynous aspects".
Jan Parandowski	Poland	Literature	1936	3rd place, bronze medalist(s)	
Milly Steger	Nazi Germany	Sculpture	1936		
Mary Wigman	Nazi Germany	Dance	1936		Harald Kreutzberg and Mary Wigman competed in the dance demonstration event, winning medals. After the Games, the Nazis had no more use for Wigman, and she was included in the artists labelled Degenerate. Dance scholars and Wigman's biographers have written on her relationship with Berthe Trümpy and possible bisexuality, and agree that being the object of same-sex desire had a great impact on her work.
Delmar Banner	Great Britain	Painting and graphic art	1948		Banner was gay, which he revealed to his wife shortly after they married; they adopted two sons together.
Walter Battiss	Union of South Africa	Painting and graphic art	1948	(bronze) (Note: Received an honourable mention in an artistic event.)	A large number of letters written by Battiss and discovered posthumously reveal his longstanding bisexuality, and "gravitation towards homosexuality in his later years".
Roy De Maistre	Great Britain	Painting and graphic art	1948		Described as "a homosexual of extreme discretion".
Jarosław Iwaszkiewicz	Poland	Literature	1948		Iwaszkiewicz' lyric work received an "honourable mention" at the Games. He dedicated it to Paul Claudel. Iwaszkiewicz is modernly considered bisexual, and there are strong homoerotic themes in his work; he had a wife and children, who knew of his orientation, and described himself as homosexual.
Ernst van Heerden	Union of South Africa	Literature	1948	2nd place, silver medalist(s)	Van Heerden won his medal for a set of Afrikaans poems. An openly gay academic, he was best known for his sports poetry.

== Sources ==
=== Databases ===
Olympedia

- Olympedia (2022c). "Vincenzo Gemito".
- Olympedia (2022d). "Robert Graves".
- Olympedia (2022e). "Henry de Montherlant".
- Olympedia (2022f). "Arno Breker".
- Olympedia (2022g). "Mainie Jellett".
- Olympedia (2022h). "Emil Rudolf Weiss".
- Olympedia (2022i). "Thomas Eakins".
- Olympedia (2022j). "Winslow Homer".
- Olympedia (2022k). "Delmar Banner".
- Olympedia (2022l). "Eleuter Iwaszkiewicz".
- Olympedia (2022m). "Ernst van Heerden".

=== Literature ===
- Aldrich, Robert F.; Wotherspoon, Garry (2001). Who's who in Gay and Lesbian History: From Antiquity to World War II (1 ed.). Psychology Press. ISBN 978-0-415-15982-1.
- Aldrich, Robert F.; Wotherspoon, Garry (2020). Who's Who in Gay and Lesbian History: From Antiquity to the Mid-Twentieth Century (2 ed.). Routledge. ISBN 978-1-000-15888-5.
- Arnaud, Claude (1 January 2016). Jean Cocteau: A Life. Yale University Press. pp. 661–669. ISBN 978-0-300-17057-3.
- Arya, Rina (2017). "The Influence of Roy de Maistre on Francis Bacon". Religion and the Arts. 21 (5): 607–622. doi:10.1163/15685292-02105001.
- Bleys, Rudi (27 October 2000). Images of Ambiente: Homotextuality and Latin American Art, 1810-today. A&C Black. pp. 40–43. ISBN 978-0-8264-4723-4.
- Check, Ed; Deniston, Grace; Desai, Dipti (1 January 1997). "Living the Discourses". Journal of Social Theory in Art Education. 17 (1): 40–70. ISSN 1057-0292.
- Cohn, Sherrye (1996). "A Thoughtful Gravity: Childhood in Winslow Homer's Early Paintings". The San Francisco Jung Institute Library Journal. 15 (2): 25–34. doi:10.1525/jung.1.1996.15.2.25.
- Eden, Myrna G. (1987). Energy and Individuality in the Art of Anna Huntington, Sculptor and Amy Beach, Composer. Scarecrow Press. p. 22. ISBN 9780810819160.
- Ellenzweig, Allen (2011). "Before You Visit the Exhibit ..." The Gay & Lesbian Review Worldwide. 18 (1): 37+ – via Gale Academic OneFile.
- Gaze, Delia; Mihajlovic, Maja; Shrimpton, Leanda (1997). Dictionary of Women Artists: Introductory surveys; Artists, A-I. Taylor & Francis. p. 661. ISBN 978-1-884964-21-3.
- Graves, Robert (1985). Good-Bye To All That (Vintage International ed.). Knopf Doubleday Publishing. p. 19. ISBN 9780385093309.
- Hanley, Elizabeth A. (2004). Wamsley, Kevin B. (ed.). "The Role of Dance in the 1936 Berlin Olympic Games". Seventh International Symposium for Olympic Research. London, Ontario: LA84 Foundation.
- Kraß, Andreas; Sluhovsky, Moshe; Yonay, Yuval (31 December 2021). Queer Jewish Lives Between Central Europe and Mandatory Palestine: Biographies and Geographies. transcript Verlag. p. 50. ISBN 978-3-8394-5332-2.
- Lançon, Christian (2016). "Philippe Giquel, le prince des airs". Montherlant.be.
- Langa, Helen (9 April 2010). "Seeing Queerly: Looking for Lesbian Presence and Absence in United States Visual Art, 1890 to 1950". Journal of Lesbian Studies. 14 (2–3): 124–139. doi:10.1080/10894160903196509. ISSN 1089-4160. PMID 20408007. S2CID 34223749.
- Lim, Wesley (2022). "Queer Orientalism and Modernism in Dance Photographs of Harald Kreutzberg and Yvonne Georgi". The German Quarterly. 95 (2): 167–182. doi:10.1111/gequ.12260. ISSN 0016-8831. S2CID 248717960.
- Lübbren, Nina (2020). "Ornament, monument and gender in German sculpture, 1910–1930: Milly Steger and Renée Sintenis". Sculpture and the Decorative in Britain and Europe: Seventeenth Century to Contemporary. London: Bloomsbury. ISBN 9781501341274.
- Manning, Susan (2006). Ecstasy and the Demon: The Dances of Mary Wigman. U of Minnesota Press. pp. xvi–xvii. ISBN 978-0-8166-3802-4.
- McFeely, William S. (2007). Portrait: The Life Of Thomas Eakins. W. W. Norton & Company. pp. 47, 51, 128. ISBN 978-0393330687.
- McGarry, Molly (1998). "Review of Improper Bostonians: Lesbian and Gay History from the Puritans to Playland". The New England Quarterly. 71 (4): 648–652. doi:10.2307/366610. ISSN 0028-4866. JSTOR 366610.
- Meyer, Steven (2001). Irresistible Dictation: Gertrude Stein and the Correlations of Writing and Science. Stamford, California: Stanford University Press. ISBN 9780804749305.
- Nero, Julie (2014). "Engaging masculinity: Weimar women artists and the boxer". Woman's Art Journal. 35 (1) – via Gale Academic OneFile.
- Newton, Judith Vale; Weiss, Carol Ann (2004). Skirting the Issue: Stories of Indiana's Historical Women Artists. Indiana Historical Society Press. pp. 45, 321. ISBN 9780871951779.
- Ozoliņš, Jānis; Vērdiņš, Kārlis (14 December 2016). Queer Stories of Europe. Cambridge Scholars Publishing. p. 23. ISBN 978-1-4438-5561-7.
- Potter, Pamela M. (28 June 2016). Art of Suppression: Confronting the Nazi Past in Histories of the Visual and Performing Arts. University of California Press. p. 25. ISBN 978-0-520-28234-6.
- Ruprecht, Lucia (18 July 2019). "Floral Pathochoreographies: Mime Studies by Harald Kreutzberg, Alfred Döblin, and Jo Mihaly". doi:10.1093/oso/9780190659370.003.0010.
- Seymour, Miranda (1995). Robert Graves: Life on the Edge. London: Doubleday. ISBN 0-385-40860-9.
- Sherman North, Cori (2019). "The Swedish Experience in Mid-America" (PDF). Birger Sandzén Memorial Gallery. p. 3.
- Siddons, Louise (2021). "Intimate Relations: Touch and Gaze Across Media in the Collaborative Portraits of Laura Gilpin and Brenda Putnam" (PDF). The Courtauld Institute of Art.
- Summers, Claude (23 March 2012). The Queer Encyclopedia of the Visual Arts. Cleis Press Start. ISBN 978-1-57344-874-1.
- Toepfer, Karl Eric (1997). Empire of Ecstasy: Nudity and Movement in German Body Culture, 1910–1935. Berkeley, Los Angeles, Oxford: University of California Press. p. 315. ISBN 9780520918276.
- Tolles, Thayer (2006). ""Art as the true expression of life": Harriet Whitney Frishmuth to 1940". In Conner, Janis (ed.). Captured Motion: The Sculpture of Harriet Whitney Frishmuth. New York: Hohmann Holdings LLC. p. 28.
- von Stuckrad, Kocku (15 February 2022). A Cultural History of the Soul: Europe and North America from 1870 to the Present. Columbia University Press. ISBN 978-0-231-55357-5.
- Woods, Gregory (21 November 2017). Homintern: How Gay Culture Liberated the Modern World. Yale University Press. pp. 26–27. ISBN 978-0-300-23499-2.

=== Print media ===
- Beukman, Barnard, ed. (23 March 2016). "Pierneef hou ligte aan met skildery". Beeld (in Afrikaans).
- Fiegl, Amanda (2008). ""No More Long Faces"". Smithsonian Magazine.
- François, Emmanuelle (2 March 2018). "The woman behind the Bär". Exberliner.
- James, Edwin Leland, ed. (11 June 1940). "Obituaries: JANET SCUDDER, SCULPTOR, DIES, 66; One of the World's Foremost Women in Field Succumbs in Summer Home FAMOUS FOR FOUNTAINS Works Shown in 14 Museums --Had Lived in Paris for 45 Years—Also a Painter Returned Here Last Fall Worked at Chicago Fair of '93 Some of Her Sculptures Aided French in Two Wars" (PDF). The New York Times. New York City. p. 25 – via TimesMachine.
- Schmitz, Julia (17 December 2017). "The New Confidence". Schirn Kunsthalle Frankfurt.

=== Web media ===
- Bosold, Birgit; Klugbauer, Carina, eds. (2018). "Guided Tour: LESBIAN VISIONS (English)". Schwules Museum.
- Bugajski, Leszek (6 February 2010). "Miłość Iwaszkiewicza" [Iwaszkiewicz's love]. Newsweek Polska.
- Byrne, Christopher (30 May 2020). "Female Nude Seated: Boxed In". Gay City News.
- Coulthart, John (9 August 2011). "The art of Ludwig von Hofmann, 1861–1945". Feuilleton. Archived from the original on 13 April 2021.
- Gillie, Courtney; Adams, John Henry, eds. (2021). "Sappho of Lesbos (ca. 610-570 BCE) · Leaders and Heroes 2: The Arts · Special Collections and Archives". University of Missouri Library.
- Harrity, Christopher (18 July 2015). "Gay Artists – Spotlight on Gay Art From Around the Globe: Ludwig von Hofmann". The Advocate. Archived from the original on 26 August 2022.
- Herman, Michelle, ed. (2022). "Beatrice Fenton letters to Marjorie D. Martinet, circa 1870-1928". Archives of American Art. Smithsonian Institution.
- Jeffries, Stuart (7 September 2021). "Hitler's favourite artists: why do Nazi statues still stand in Germany?". The Guardian.
- Morgan, Joe (10 August 2016). "Here are 24 weird and wonderful facts from LGBTI Olympics history". Gay Star News. Archived from the original on 14 August 2022.
- PinkNews (5 August 2016). "Did you know the first out gay athlete nearly competed at the 1908 Olympics?".
- Scupham-Bilton, Tony (27 July 2016a). "First gay Olympian in History Competed in 1928". Outsports.
- Shirley, Jason (4 February 2019). "LGBT History Month 2019 faces – Robert Graves". University of Canterbury Library.
- Sidebotham, Leah (9 February 2021). "Persecution of gay people in Nazi Germany". Wiener Holocaust Library.
- Siebrits, Warren (10 July 2016). "Walter Battiss, the man who lived five lives". TimesLIVE. Archived from the original on 10 August 2022.
- Walker, Berta, ed. (2021). "Creative Couples of Cape Cod". Artsy.
