= John Hughes (architect) =

British architect

Medal record

Art competitions

Representing Great Britain

Olympic Games
Gold medal – first place	1932 Los Angeles	Town planning

John Hughes (14 June 1903 – 20 February 1977) was a British architect. In 1932 he won a gold medal in the art competitions of the Olympic Games for his design of a "Sports and Recreation Centre with Stadium, for the City of Liverpool".
