= Romano Dazzi =

Italian artist (1905–1976)

Olympic medal record

Art competitions
Silver medal – second place	1936 Berlin	Drawings and water colours

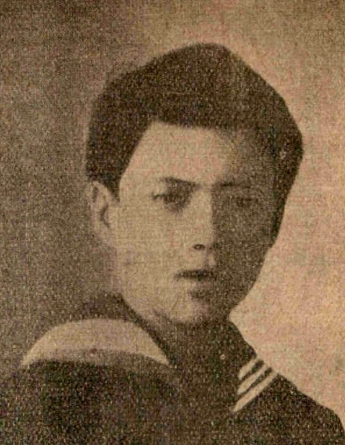
In 1919

Romano Dazzi (10 February 1905 – 16 August 1976) was an Italian artist. He was born in Rome, son of sculptor and painter Arturo Dazzi who taught himself to draw. He was recognized for his artistic prowess at the age of thirteen, drawing war scenes after watching movies. In 1926 he decorated the Aula Magna of the Accademia di Educazione Fisica in Rome. In 1936 he won a silver medal in the art competitions of the Olympic Games for his "Quattro bozzetti per affreschi" ("Four Sketches for Frescoes").

== Biography ==
He was born in Rome to parents from Carrara, the famous sculptor and painter Arturo Dazzi and Lia Scopsi. A Child prodigy, he immediately showed talent for drawing. In 1919, Anton Giulio Bragaglia invited him to exhibit at his Anton Giulio Bragaglia. It was Dazzi's first solo exhibition, featuring animals, portraits, and war scenes, which brought him fame even abroad.

After his father abandoned the family, he trained under the guidance of Ugo Ojetti, who sought to guide his artistic development.

After a trip to Libya in 1923 with Marshal Rodolfo Graziani Italian colonial troops, Dazzi experimented with ceramics, frescoes, and engraving, without ever abandoning drawing.

In 1928, American Walter Beck published a study dedicated to the young artist entitled Self-Development in Drawing as Interpreted by the Genius of Romano Dazzi and Other Children.

Between 1928 and 1930, he decorated the Aula Magna of the Academy of Physical Education at the Foro Italico in Rome with four frescoes on the theme of sport. In 1936, he won the silver medal at the Olympic art competitions for his sketches of the frescoes.

In 1929, he married Vanna Farina Cini, with whom he had three children: Marco, Andrea, and Chiara.

In 1930, he participated in the IV Triennale di Arti Decorative e Industriali (Fourth Triennial Exhibition of Decorative and Industrial Arts) in Monza, where he presented several vase designs created for Manifattura Cantagalli in Florence, owned by his mother-in-law Flavia Cantagalli.

In 1931, he made a second trip to Libya, where he produced a rich series of drawings and frescoes on latticework.

Between the 1920s and 1930s, he exhibited at important exhibitions in Italy and abroad, including the Venice Biennales and colonial exhibitions. In 1943, he created a series of long-distance war navigation badges and several silver cups for the Royal Navy.
