= Edy Knupfer =

Swiss architect

Olympic medal record

Art competitions
Silver medal – second place	1948 London	Town planning

Edy Rudolf Knupfer (July 11, 1912 – November 28, 1979) was a Swiss architect. In 1948 he won a silver medal together with Werner Schindler in the art competitions of the Olympic Games for their "Projekt ETS Magglingen, Eidgenössische Turn- und Sportschule" ("Swiss Federal Sports and Gymnastics Training Centre").
