= Alex Diggelmann =

Swiss artist (1902–1987)

Olympic medal record

Art competitions
| Gold medal – first place | 1936 Berlin | Applied graphics |
| Silver medal – second place | 1948 London | Applied graphics |
| Bronze medal – third place | 1948 London | Applied graphics |

Alex Walter Diggelmann (20 August 1902 – 21 November 1987) was a Swiss graphic artist and book designer best known for his sports posters. Diggelmann won three medals in the Olympic Games.

Diggelmann won a gold medal in 1936 for a poster entitled Arosa I Placard, and a bronze one and a silver one in 1948 for two commercial posters, the "World Championship for Cycling Poster" and the "World Championship for Ice Hockey Poster". He also designed the trophy presented annually to the winners of the UEFA Cup.

He is only one of two artists who won three medals in art competition. The other was the Danish writer Josef Petersen.
