= Albert Decaris =

French artist

Olympic medal record

Art competitions
Gold medal – first place	1948 London	Etching and Engraving

Albert Decaris (6 May 1901 – 1 January 1988) was a French artist, engraver, painter and Olympic Gold Medallist.

== Early life ==
Decaris was born in Sotteville-lès-Rouen. At age 19, Decaris won the Concours de Rome, which was seen as the premiere award among young French artists at the time. He was elected Fellow of The French Académie des Beaux Arts in 1943.

== Career ==
Decaris was the first illustrator of luxury art books such as Le Chant de Mon Voyage vers la Grèce by Léon Cathlin, Combourg by Chateaubriand, Les Discours des Misères de ce Temps by Ronsard and Les Destinées by Alfred de Vigny. Decaris joined the infamous group called FVHJ at age 24.

In the 1930s, Decaris began engraving postage stamps, resulting in more than 500 such designs, for various postal services, notably French and African. Stamp collectors are fond of Decaris' stamps, as well as derivative products: small images and first day covers.

At the same time Decaris was preparing large plates, mostly for his own pleasure, on a wide variety of subjects: careful (almost technical) representations of monuments and places of interest, scenes of history, real life or imaginary; scenes of mythology or imagination, verging on surrealism; mere caricatures, with a sense of humor. Some are collected in albums, such as The Apocalypse or The Zodiac.

Decaris was one of the best and most meritorious French engravers of the 20th century, with a strange mix of classicism and audacity. As reflected by columnist Yvan Christ, "Decaris' works take place beyond times and styles. They are made for duration." (L'Amateur d'Art, Paris, Feb 1988).

Decaris is also notable for being the last person to ever win an Olympic Gold Medal for Etching and Engraving, with his work The Swimming Pool, at the 1948 Summer Games in London. After that Olympiad, the artistic medal categories were discontinued.
