= Paul Höffer =

German composer

Olympic medal record

Art competitions
Gold medal – first place	1936 Berlin	Solo and chorus

Paul Höffer (21 December 1895 – 31 August 1949) was a German composer. He was born in Barmen and died in Berlin.

In 1936 he won a gold medal in the art competitions of the Olympic Games for his Olympischer Schwur (Olympic Vow). His works also include a solo violin sonata (Op. 18, 1931).
