= Józef Klukowski =

Polish sculptor (1894–1945)

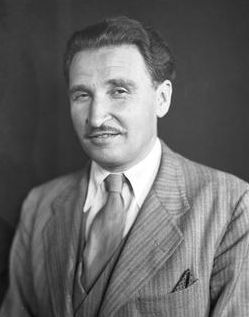
- Portrait of Józef Klukowski

Medal record

Art competitions

Representing Poland

Olympic Games
Gold medal – first place	1932 Los Angeles	Medals and reliefs
Silver medal – second place	1936 Berlin	Reliefs

Józef Klukowski (2 January 1894 – 29 April 1945) was a Polish sculptor. In 1932 he won a gold medal in the art competitions of the Olympic Games for his "Wieńczenie zawodnika" ("Sport Sculpture"). Four years later he won a silver medal in the art competitions of the Olympic Games for his "Piłkarze" ("Football").

He took part in the Warsaw Uprising in 1944 and was killed on a transport from the Sachsenhausen concentration camp while being moved to Bergen-Belsen.
