= Hermann Kutschera =

Austrian architect

Olympic medal record

Art competitions
Gold medal – first place	1936 Berlin	Architectural design

Hermann Kutschera (April 27, 1903 – November 4, 1991) was an Austrian architect. He was born in Vienna. In 1936 he won a gold medal in the art competitions of the Olympic Games for his "Sprungschanze mit Stadion" ("Skiing Stadium").
