= Hans Stoiber =

Austrian poet

Olympic medal record

Art competitions
Bronze medal – third place	1936 Berlin	Lyric works

Dr Hans Helmut Stoiber (11 October 1918 – 10 January 2015) was an Austrian poet born in Zell am See. In 1936, he won a bronze medal in the art competitions at the Olympic Games for his work titled "Der Diskus" ("The Discus").
