= Carel Scharten =

Dutch poet

Olympic medal record

Art competitions
Bronze medal – third place	1928 Amsterdam	Epic works

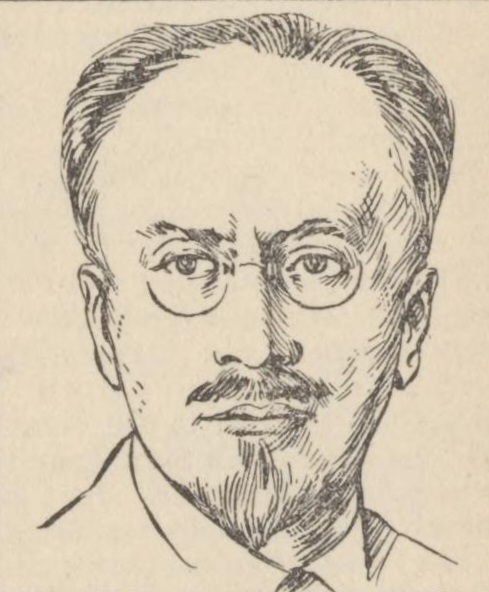
Carel Scharten

Carel Theodorus Scharten (March 14, 1878 – October 31, 1950) was a Dutch novelist and poet. He was born in Middelburg and died in Florence, Italy. In 1928 he and his wife Margo Scharten-Antink won a bronze medal in the art competitions of the Olympic Games for their "De nar uit Maremmen" ("The Fool from the Maremma").
