= Urho Karhumäki =

Finnish poet

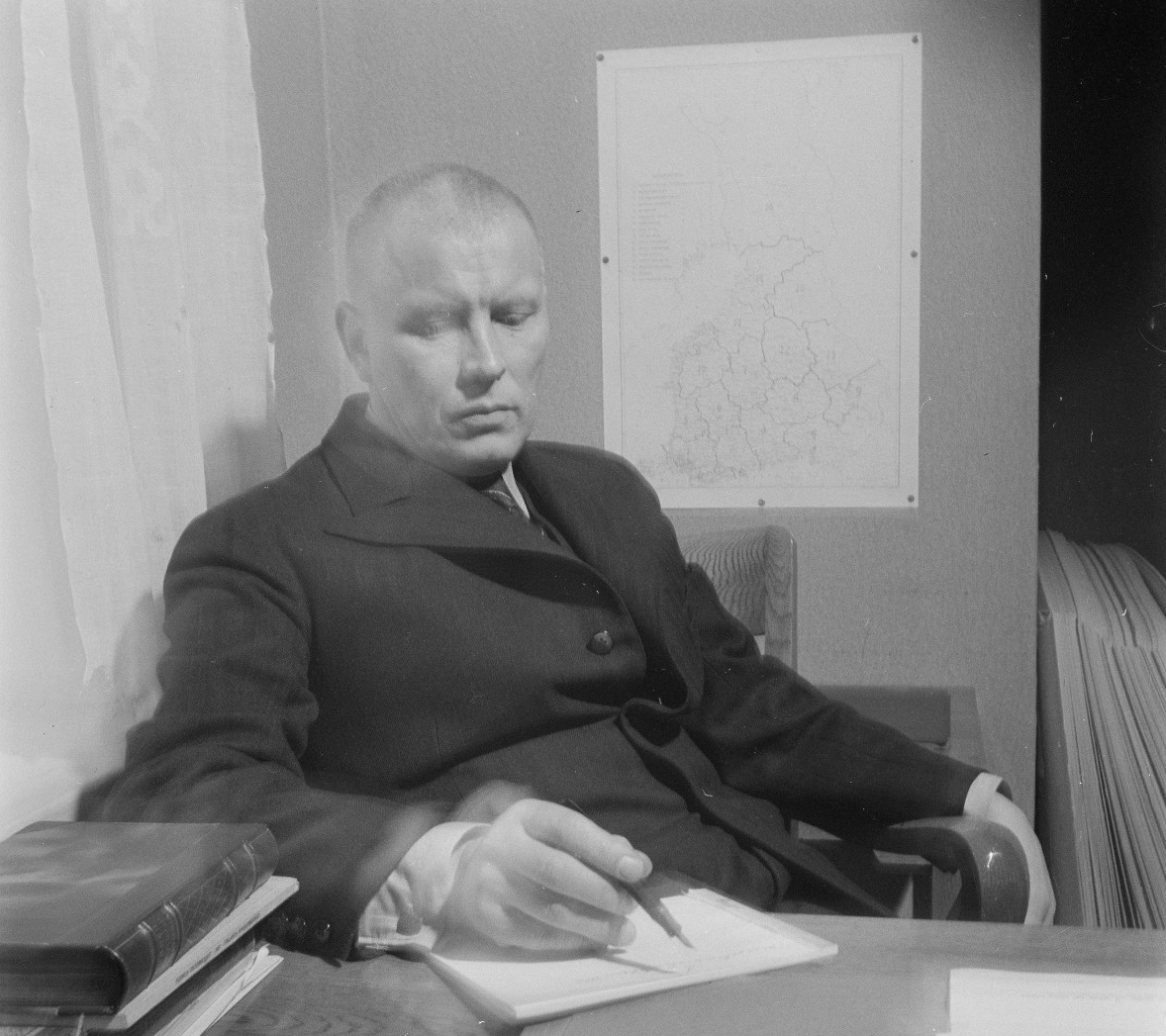
- Karhumäki in 1939

Medal record

Olympic medal record

Art competitions
Gold medal – first place	1936 Berlin	Epic works

Urho Karhumäki (June 7, 1891, Multia – February 26, 1947, Vihti) was a Finnish poet. In 1936 he won a gold medal in the art competitions of the Olympic Games for his "Avoveteen" ("Into free water").

== Some works ==
- Syöttöpaikassa, 1929
- Kymi nousee, 1930
- Herpmanin pojat, 1931
- Kerhoista ja kotoa, 1931
- Juoksijan rata, 1932
- Korpiherra, 1932
- Hiihtäjän latu, 1933
- Ukkonen uhkaa, 1934
- Elämännälkä, 1935
- Tuli ja leimaus, 1935
- Vorttuuna ja Tiapolo, 1935
- Avoveteen, 1936
- Elämän kouluun, 1936
- A.I.V.-rehua, 1938
- Testamentti, 1938
- Yli rajan, 1938
- Työ Suomen Hyväks', 1939
- Tunturille, 1940
- Miesten matkassa, 1941
- Voittajana maaliin, 1942
- Rantasuon raivaajat, 1943
- Terve sielu terveessä ruumiissa, 1944
- Viulu ja posetiivi, 1944
- Kylä järven rannalla, 1945
- Valitut teokset, 1960

== Sources ==
- Biography in Biographykeskus
- Suomen elämäkerrasto. Helsinki, 1955. page 373. Ilmari Heikinheimo
