= Milo Martin =

Swiss sculptor and artist (1893–1970)

Olympic medal record

Art competitions
Silver medal – second place	1928 Amsterdam	Sculpture

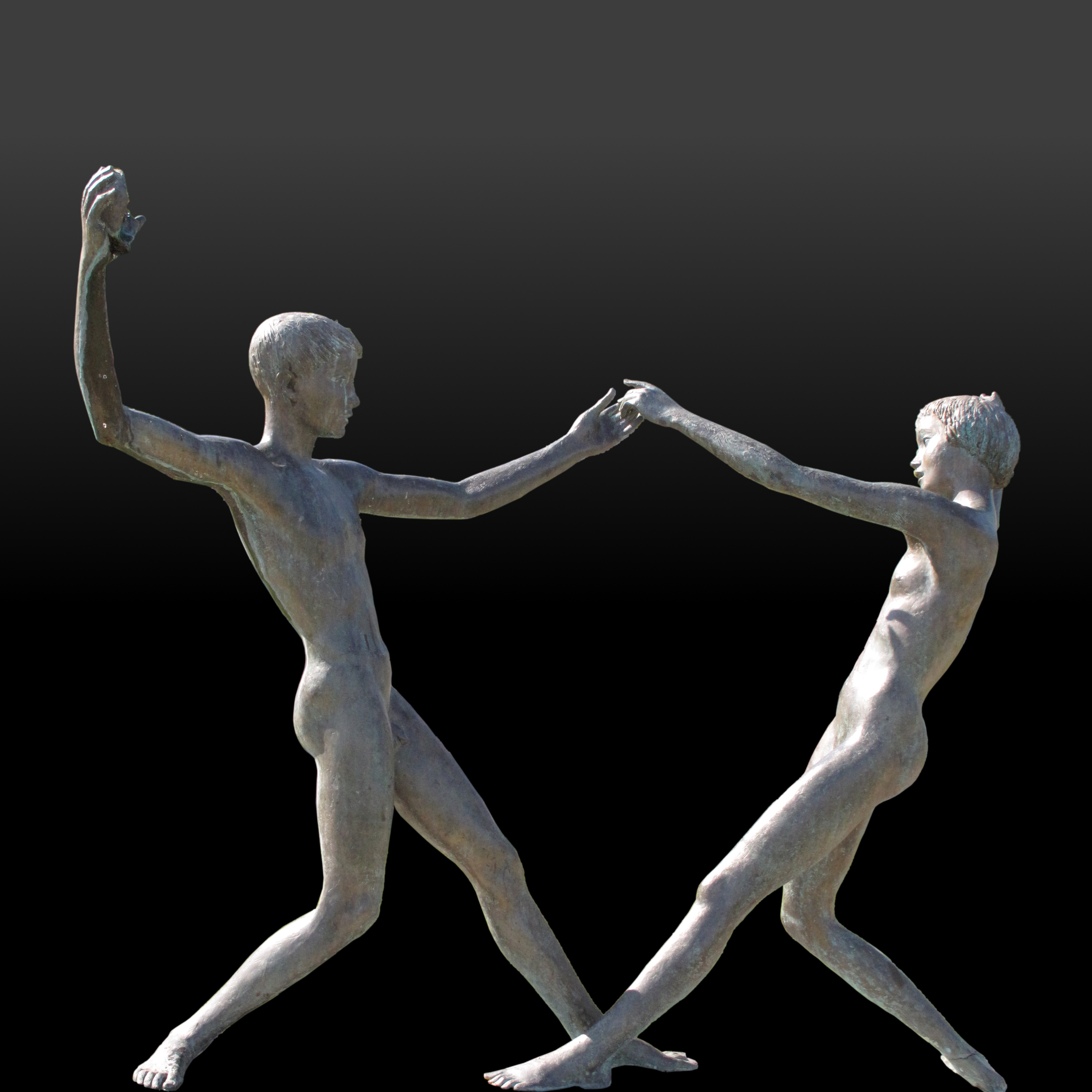
Boy and girl, Quai Lochmann, Morges

Milo Martin (6 February 1893 – 26 July 1970) was a Swiss sculptor and medal-artist.

== Life ==
He was born in Morges as the son of Émile Martin, an engraver and lithographer. Milo Martin studied in Lausanne (notably under Carl Albert Angst), Rome and Florence, but disapproved of art schools' teaching methods and decided to work alone. He specialised in neo-classical nude sculptures, realistic portraits and medal designs.

He set up a studio in the Orangerie of Parc Mon-Repos. Most of his sculptures are spread across the Lausanne region. He also travelled to other European countries to exhibit his works in international exhibitions - these included those in Brussels and Amsterdam in 1928, in Paris in 1934, Vienna in 1937 (where he won "lauriers d'or" or the golden laurels), Cairo and Alexandria in 1938 and New York in 1939-1940.

He won first prize in the national competition for medal design at the Swiss National Exhibition in Berne in 1913 and the silver medal for sculpture in the art competitions of the 1928 Olympic Games for his "Athlète au repos". He won several public commissions and from 1931 to 1936 sat on Switzerland's federal commission for fine arts. He died in Lausanne.

== Sources ==
- (in French) http://www.hls-dhs-dss.ch/textes/f/F22511.php
- (in French) http://www.sikart.ch/KuenstlerInnen.aspx?id=4023462
- (in French) Formes et couleurs, no 4 1941
- (in French) La XXe exposition nationale des beaux-arts photographie de la médaille de l'Exposition nationale suisse, Berne 1914, photographie Paul Bonzon
- (in French) Dict. biogr. de l'art suisse, vol. 2, p. 683
- (in French) Appendix in C.-F. Landry Milo Martin, sculpteur, Lausanne 1941
- (in French) Lausanne Patrie suisse, (A. B.) 1920, no 689, p. 40-41; see also revue no 611, 1917, p. 42 and no 683, 1919, p. 283
- (in French) photographie E. Gos, Lausanne Patrie suisse, (Edmond Bille) 1930, no 1064, p. 478-479
