= Werner Schindler =

Swiss architect

Olympic medal record

Art competitions
Silver medal – second place	1948 London	Town planning

Werner Schindler (February 13, 1905 – January 10, 1986) was a Swiss architect. In 1948 he won a silver medal together with Edy Knupfer in the art competitions of the Olympic Games for their "Projekt ETS Magglingen, Eidgenössische Turn- und Sportschule" ("Swiss Federal Sports and Gymnastics Training Centre").
