= Edwin Grienauer =

Austrian sculptor

Olympic medal record

Art competitions
Gold medal – first place	1928 Amsterdam	Sculpture
Bronze medal – third place	1948 London	Sculpture

Edwin Grienauer (March 7, 1893 – August 21, 1964) was an Austrian sculptor and medalist. He was born and died in Vienna.

== Life ==
Edwin Grienauer was the son of cellist Karl Grienauer and opera singer Helene Schott. His father migrated to the U.S. to pursue his musical career, leaving Edwin to fend for himself in Vienna. At 19, Edwin created his first portrait plaques and then went on to study at Vienna's applied arts college, the Wiener Kunstgewerbeschule). He fought in World War I and suffered an injury that partially disfigured his face. In 1935, he received the title of Professor and taught at the Vienna Arts Academy (Akademie der bildenden Künste) after 1945. His studio was located in the Vienna Prater park, where he died in 1964.

The artist was an excellent amateur in rowing and won the Austrian championships in double sculls in 1927. His Olympic success came from his art, however: in 1928 he won a gold medal in the art competitions of the Olympic Games for his "Médailles" and twenty years later he won a bronze medal for his "Prize Rowing Trophy".

== Work ==
Grienauer was proficient in all areas of sculptural design. He is particularly well known as a designer of Austrian commemorative and regular issue coins. The medal work of Grienauer is dominated by award and service medals of national or economic institutions and prizes for sporting events.

His large sculptures are still present today in Vienna and include reliefs and architectural sculptures, religious statues on and in churches in Vienna and Baden, and even floor tiles for St Stephan's Cathedral. A tabernacle showing the Annunciation to Mary is in the archives of the cathedral.

Works include coining dies of the Austrian 1st and 2nd Republic. Grienauer designed the denomination side of the last one-Schilling-coin of Austria, which was in circulation from 1959 to 2002. He designed commemorative and regular issue coins for Liechtenstein as well.

A complete list of Grienauer's work has not yet been established. It was only in 2003 that the institute for numismatics at Vienna University started to work on Grienauer's estate which had been permanently loaned to the institute by the artist's descendants. In addition to coins and medals, the estate contains drawings, models and coining dies, which illustrate the creative process and techniques of medal-making.
