= Rudolph Simonsen =

Danish composer

Olympic medal record

Art competitions
Bronze medal – third place	1928 Amsterdam	Orchestra

Rudolph Hermann Simonsen (April 30, 1889 in Copenhagen, Denmark – March 28, 1947 in Copenhagen, Denmark) was a Danish composer and pianist. In 1928, he won a bronze medal in the art competitions of the Olympic Games for his Symphony No. 2: Hellas.

He studied under Otto Malling and Agnes Adler.

From 1931 to 1947 Simonsen headed the Royal Danish Academy of Music.

He has received the Danish chivalric order, Order of the Dannebrog.
