= Josuë Dupon =

Belgian sculptor

Olympic medal record

Art competitions
Bronze medal – third place	1936 Berlin	Medals

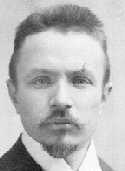
Josuë Dupon

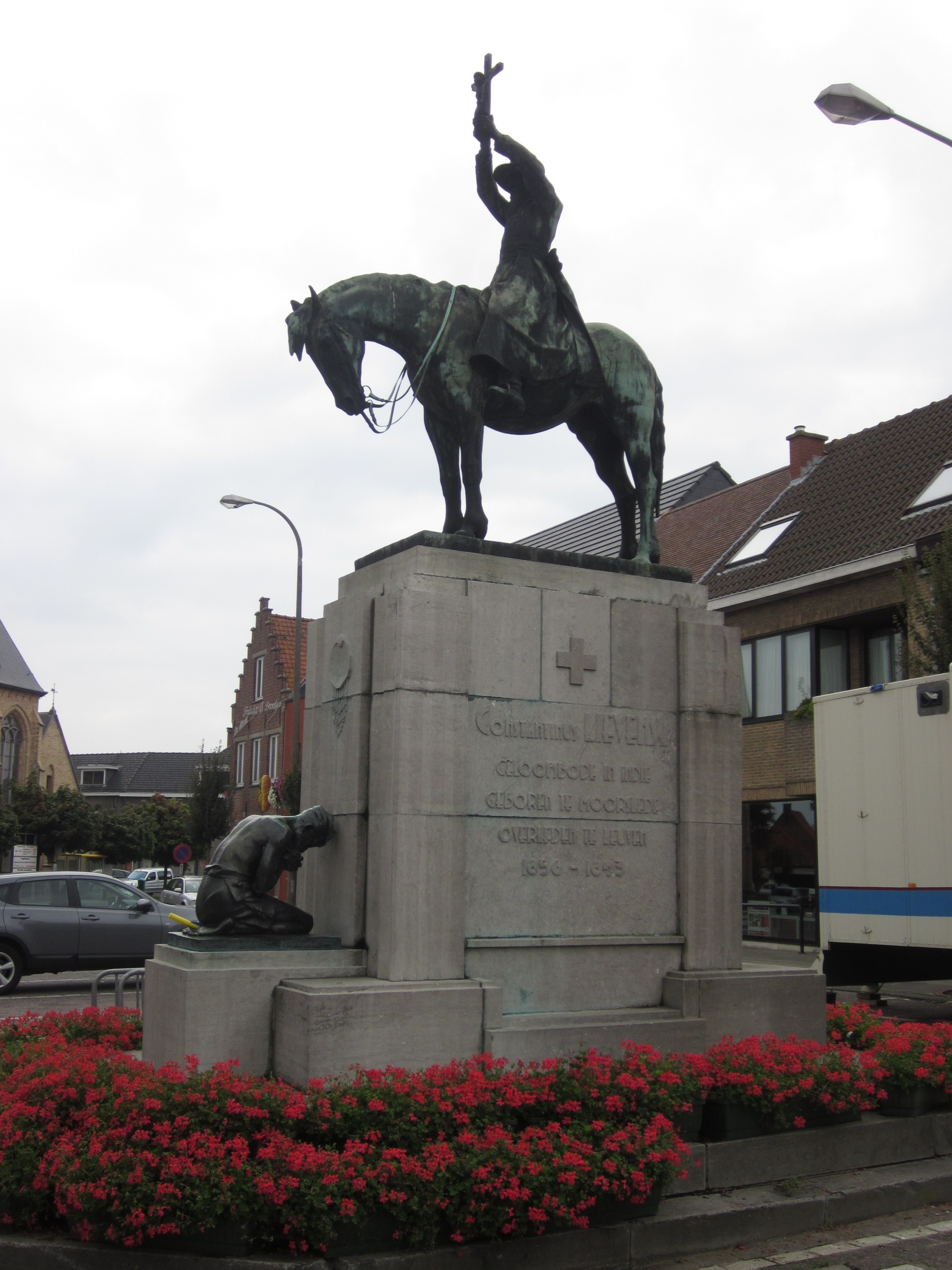
Fr Constant Lievens's equestrian statue in Moorslede (by Josuë Dupon)

Josuë Dupon (22 May 1864 – 13 October 1935) was a Belgian sculptor. He was born in Ichtegem and died in Antwerp. In 1936, he was posthumously awarded with a bronze medal in the art competitions of the Olympic Games for his "Equestrian Medals".
