= André Verbeke =

Belgian architect

Medal record

Art competitions

Representing Belgium

Olympic Games
Bronze medal – third place	1932 Los Angeles	Town planning

André Verbeke (2 January 1908 – 9 March 1978) was a Belgian architect. In 1932 he won a bronze medal in the art competitions of the Olympic Games for his design of a "Marathon Park".
