= Margo Scharten-Antink =

Dutch poet

Olympic medal record

Art competitions
Bronze medal – third place	1928 Amsterdam	Epic works

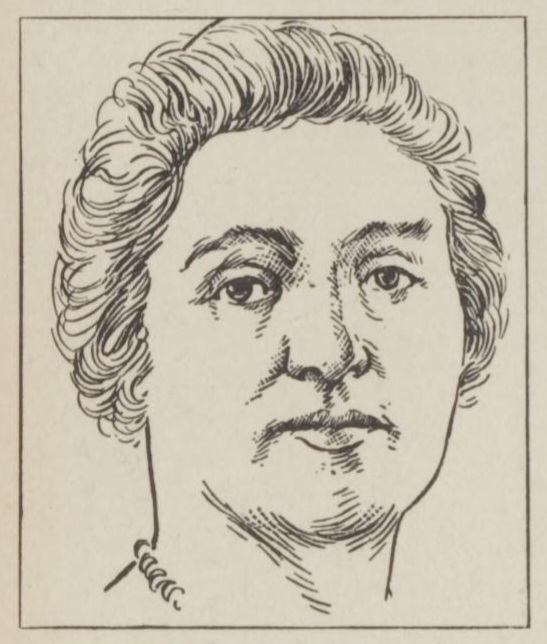
Margo Scharten-Antink

Margo Sybranda Everdina Scharten-Antink (September 7, 1868 – November 27, 1957) was a Dutch poet. She was born in Zutphen and died in Florence, Italy. In 1928 she and her husband Carel Scharten won a bronze medal in the art competitions of the Olympic Games for their "De nar uit Maremmen" ("The Fool in Maremma").
