= Janina Konarska =

Polish artist

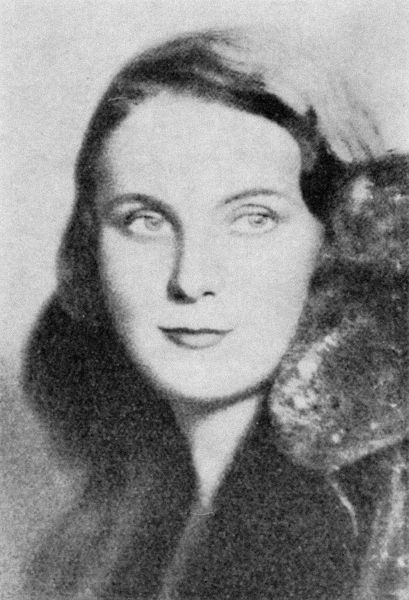
- Konarska, c.1930

Medal record

Art competitions

Representing Poland

Olympic Games
Silver medal – second place	1932 Los Angeles	Prints

Janina Konarska (later Konarska-Słonimska, April 30, 1900 – June 9, 1975) was a Polish artist. She was born in Warsaw and was the wife of Antoni Słonimski.

In 1932 she won a silver medal in the art competitions of the Olympic Games for her woodcut "Narciarze" ("Skier").
