= Jens Klemmensen =

Danish architect (1902–1977)

Medal record

Art competitions

Representing Denmark

Olympic Games
| Silver medal – second place | 1932 Los Angeles | Town planning |

Jens Hovmøller Klemmensen (February 23, 1902 – February 17, 1977) was a Danish architect. In 1932 he won a silver medal in the art competitions at the Los Angeles Games for his design of a "Stadium and Public Park".
