= Joseph Golinkin =

American artist

Medal record

Art competitions

Representing the United States

Olympic Games
Gold medal – first place	1932 Los Angeles	Prints

Joseph Webster Golinkin (September 10, 1896 – September 8, 1977) was an American artist as well as a Rear Admiral in the United States Navy.

== Biography ==
Joseph Webster Golinkin was in the Navy until the year of 1922. He then resigned in order to follow his dream of becoming an artist. Although he resigned from the Navy, he was still considered to be in the active reserve as a Lieutenant Commander. He also lived in New York City, New York. Joseph Golinkin was reactivated into the Navy in the year of 1938. He eventually retired from the Navy in the year of 1958. He got to the ranking of Rear Admiral.

== Education ==
Joseph Webster Golinkin received his education at the Art Institute of Chicago. He then entered the United States Naval Academy. After his graduation, he was commissioned as an Ensign and was deployed to serve in World War I. Golinkin studied under Ash Can school artist, George Luks.

== Career ==
Joseph Webster Golinkin was successful in pursuing the occupations of being a painter, printmaker, naval officer, politician, environmentalist, and philanthropist. As an artist, Golinkin worked with various medias that included painting, watercolor, and lithography. His work typically revolves around New York scenes, sporting events, and depictions of American life in the 1920s and 1930s. There were a few published books that featured his art as well. Golinkin had begun his career during the time when newspapers were still using artists as illustrators. The newspapers that featured his illustrations include New York Times, Vanity Fair, Fortune, Country Life, and other publications as well.

== Success ==
He won a gold medal in the prints category at the art competitions at the 1932 Summer Olympics for his Leg Scissors. He was awarded a Bronze Star while he served in World War II.
