= Jacques Lambert =

French architect

Olympic medal record

Art competitions
Silver medal – second place	1928 Amsterdam	Town planning
Bronze medal – third place	1928 Amsterdam	Architectural design

Jacques Georges Lambert (French: [ʒak lɑ̃bɛʁ]; 14 January 1891 – 4 January 1948) was a French architect. At the art competitions of the 1928 Olympic Games he won a silver medal in town planning and a bronze medal in architectural design both for his "The Versailles Stadium".
