= Lino Liviabella =

Italian composer

Olympic medal record

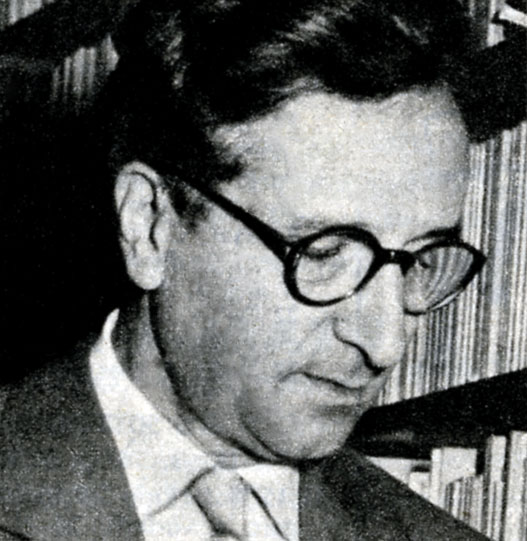
Art competitions
Silver medal – second place	1936 Berlin	Orchestra

Lino Liviabella (7 April 1902 – 21 October 1960) was an Italian composer. Liviabella was born in Macerata. In 1936 he won a silver medal in the art competitions of the Olympic Games for his "La vittoria" ("The Victor"). He died, aged 58, in Bologna.

== Selected works ==
Chamber music

- Sonata No. 1 in A minor for violin and piano (1920–1928)
- Natale, Suite for violin and piano (1923)
- Sonatina per l'Elevazione for violin and harmonium (1924)
- Canzonetta for violin and piano (1925)
- Aria for violin and organ or harmonium (1925)
- String Quartet No. 1 (1926)
- Danza for violin solo (1926)
- Adagio for oboe and piano (1926)
- S. Francesco, Meditazione for viola, 2 violins, double bass and organ (1926)
- Due espressioni liriche (2 Lyric Expressions) for string quartet (1927)
- Preludio in modo minore for 2 violins, cello and harmonium (1928)
- String Quartet No. 2 (1929)
- Bululù, Marionetta meccanica del romanzo “Eva ultima” di Massimo Bontempelli for violin and piano (1930)
- Canto andaluso for violin and piano (1930)
- Sonata ciclica for cello and piano (1931)
- Sonata No. 2 in One Movement for violin and piano (1932)
- Lento for flute, 2 violins, piano and harp
- Sonata No. 3 in One Movement for violin and piano (1934)
- Largo for cello and piano (1936)
- Canto per la Prima Comunione di Laura e Lucio for violin and harmonium (1942)
- Pastorale for violin or oboe and piano (1943)
- Lucio e Renato, Marcetta for violin and piano (1944)
- Scherzo for oboe and piano (1948)
- String Quartet No. 3 in One Movement (1948)
- Piano Trio (1948)
- Sonata No. 1 in One Movement (Prima Sonata in un tempo) for viola and piano (1950)
- Divertimento for flute, violin, viola, cello and harp (1950–1953)
- Divertimento for flute, cello and piano (1954)
- String Quartet No. 4 "La melanconia" (1955)
- Concerto in One Movement for violin and piano (1956)
- Tre momenti (3 Moments) for viola and piano (1956)
- Tre pezzi (3 Pieces) for flute and harp or piano (1956)
- Tre pezzi (3 Pieces) for flute, oboe, and harp or piano (1956)
- Sette duetti miniatura (7 Miniature Duets) for violin and viola (1957)
- Sonata No. 2 for viola and piano (1957)
- Quattro brani nuziali (4 Wedding Songs) for viola and organ or harmonium (1961)

Operas

- Santina (1922)
- Zanira (1924)
- Antigone (1942)
- La Conchiglia (1955)
- Canto di Natale (1963)
