= Wilhelm Ehmer =

German poet (1896–1976)

Olympic medal record

Art competitions
Silver medal – second place	1936 Berlin	Epic works

Wilhelm Ehmer (August 1, 1896 – June 16, 1976) was a German poet. He was born in Hong Kong and died in Lüdenscheid. In 1936 he won a silver medal in the art competitions of the Olympic Games for his Um den Gipfel der Welt (Around the Peak of the World).
