= Jan Parandowski =

Polish writer (1895–1978)

Olympic medal record

Art competitions
Bronze medal – third place	1936 Berlin	Epic works

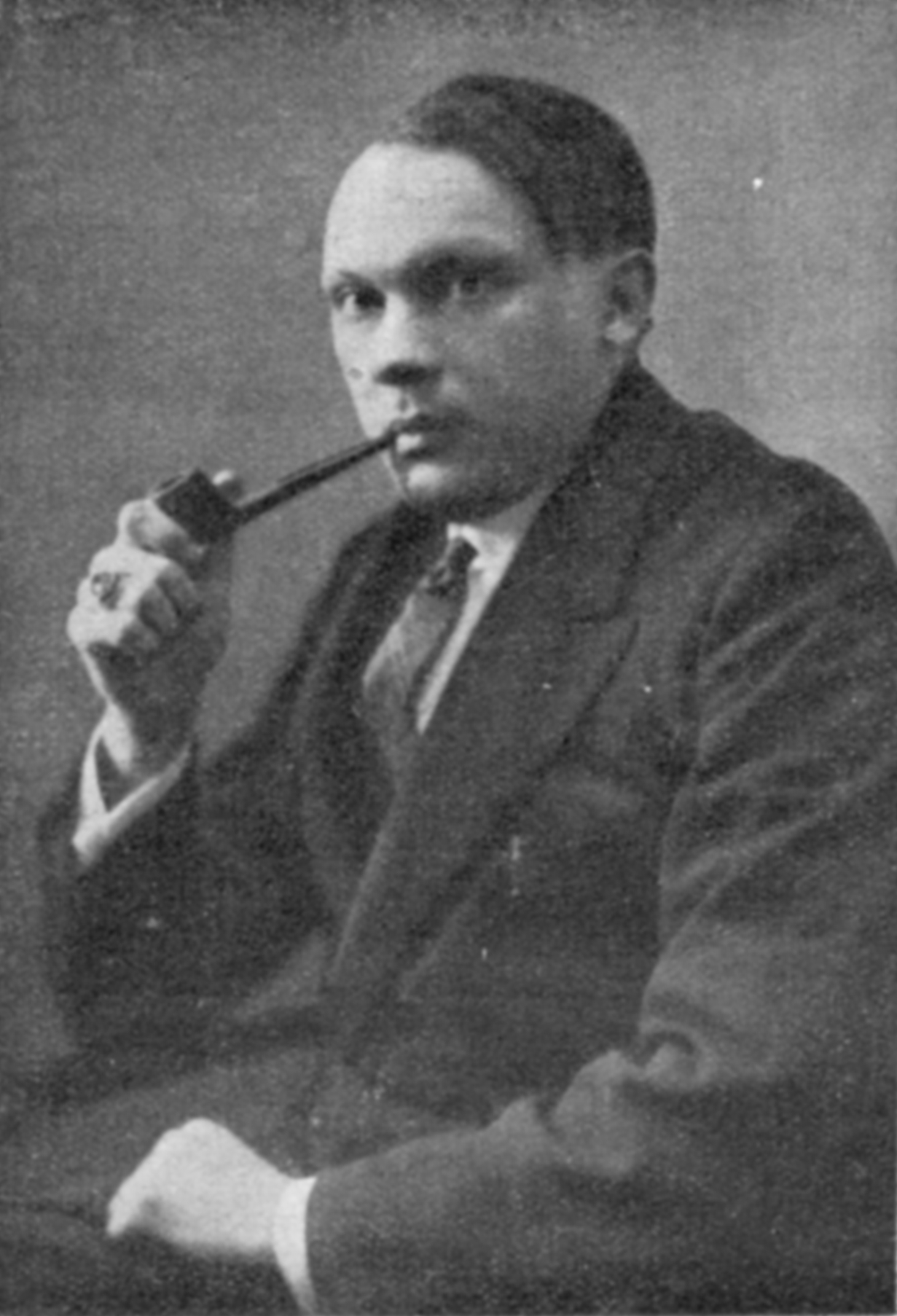
Jan Parandowski

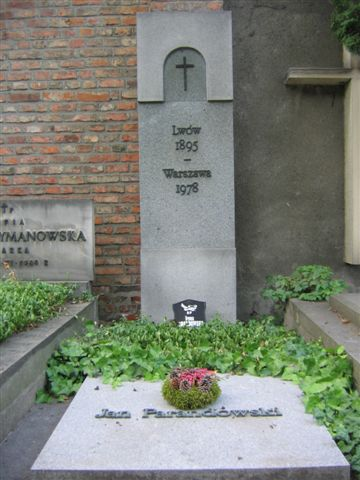
Grave of Jan Parandowski at Powązki Cemetery in Warsaw.

Jan Parandowski (11 May 1895 – 26 September 1978) was a Polish writer, essayist, and translator. Best known for his works relating to classical antiquity, he was also the president of the Polish PEN Club between 1933 and 1978, with a break during World War II. He was born in Lwów, (then Austria-Hungary, now Ukraine) and died in Warsaw.

== Biography ==
Jan Parandowski graduated from Jan Długosz High School, in Lemberg, Austria-Hungary (now Lviv, Ukraine). In 1913 he began his studies at the University of Lemberg, in the philosophy department. There he studied philosophy, classical philology, archeology, art history, and Polish literature. His studies were interrupted by World War I, during which he was interned in Russia, and consequently taught at schools in Voronezh and Saratov. From 1920 he continued his studies, and in 1923 received his master's degree in classical philology and archeology.

From 1922 to 1924 he was the literary chief for publisher Alfred Altenberg, for whom he organized a series of translations of classical works and a further "great writers" series. During this time, he was an oft correspondent for a number of Polish newspapers and magazines, including the Morning Gazette, the Illustrated Weekly, the Literary News, and the weekly, Rainbow. Between 1924 and 1926 he travelled to Greece, France, and Italy. From 1929 he lived in Warsaw, where at first he was an editor for the monthly, Warsaw Diary. In 1930 he became a member of the Polish PEN Club, and in 1933, its president.

At the 1936 Summer Olympics in Berlin, he received a bronze medal for his book, The Olympic Discus, and in 1937 he received the Polish Literary Academy's "Gold Laurels" for outstanding literary achievement. Between 1937 and 1938 he was an editor for the state publishing house for school books, and produced the educational series, Great People. After World War II began, he participated in the cultural underground. The flames of the Warsaw Uprising consumed his literary archives and his entire unpublished works.

During the years 1945 – 1950 he took over the Department of Classical Antiquity, then the Department of Comparative Literature at the Catholic University of Lublin (KUL). He became a regular member of Warszawskie Towarzystwo Naukowe (loosely translated, Warsaw Association of Sciences), worked with publications such as the Universal Weekly, Meander, Creation, and renewed his activities as chairman of the Polish PEN Club. In 1948 he organized a World Congress of Intellectuals in Wrocław, after which he returned to live in Warsaw.

In 1958, Jan Parandowski organized an International Translators Convention in Warsaw, and in 1962 he became the vice-president of International PEN. In 1964 he received the Polish State Award of the First Degree, and in the same year he was a signatory to the Letter of 34 scholars and writers in defense of freedom of speech. In 1975 he was honoured for his lifetime achievement by Radio Free Europe. In 1976 he received an honorary doctorate in Christian Philosophy from the Catholic University of Lublin (KUL).

In 1988 a prize was founded in his honour, the Jan Parandowski prize, and is awarded annually by the Polish PEN Club to exemplary historical writers.

His granddaughter is the actress Joanna Szczepkowska.

== Works ==
As a literary figure, Parandowski began writing in Lwow in 1913, though he came to experience international prominence after his much cited Mythology in 1924. His knowledge, crisp and engaging writing style, and ability to tackle the most controversial subjects contributed greatly to Parandowski's popularity. In Poland his works have become a staple of classical study in schools of all levels.

=== Selected bibliography ===
- (1919) Bolshevism and Bolsheviks in Russia by Jan Parandowski first published Ivano-Frankivsk, in Polish: Bolszewizm i bolszewicy w Rosji, 1919, and later: London 1996 Puls Publications Ltd. (ISBN 83-85571-36-1)
- (1924) Mitologia/Mythology
- (1924) Eros na Olimpie
- (1927) Dwie wiosny
- (1927) Wojna trojańska/The Trojan War
- (1930) Król życia
- (1933) Dysk olimpijski/The Olympic Discus
- (1934) Odwiedziny i spotkania
- (1935) Przygody Odyseusza
- (1936) Niebo w płomieniach
- (1949) Godzina śródziemnomorska
- (1953) Zegar słoneczny
- (1955) Pisma wybrane
- (1956) Petrarka
- (1957) Dzieła wybrane tom 1–3
- (1958) Z antycznego świata
- (1959) Mój Rzym
- (1961) Powrót do życia
- (1967) Akacja

=== Translations ===
- (1924) Historia świata Wellsa/The Outline of History by H. G. Wells
- (1925) Dafnis i Chloe/Daphnis and Chloe
- (1935) Życie Karola Wielkiego Einharda
- (1951) Wojna domowa Juliusza Cezara/Civil Wars by Julius Caesar
- (1953) Odyseja Homera/Homer's Odyssey

=== Travel Memoirs ===
- (1924) Rzym czarodziejski
- (1927) Dwie wiosny
- (1958) Podróże literackie

== Awards and decorations ==
- Commander's Cross with Star of Order of Polonia Restituta (1959)
- Commander's Cross of Order of Polonia Restituta (16 July 1954)
- Officer's Cross of Order of Polonia Restituta (9 November 1931)
- Golden Academic Laurel (7 November 1936)
- Commander of Ordre des Arts et des Lettres (France, 1973)
