= Theo Nussbaum =

German architect

Olympic medal record

Art competitions
Bronze medal – third place	1936 Berlin	Town planning

Theodor Nussbaum (Nußbaum in German) (July 3, 1885 – April 22, 1956) was a German architect. In 1936 he won a bronze medal in the art competitions of the Olympic Games for his "Kölner Stadtplan und Sportanlagen" ("Municipal Planning and Sporting Centre in Cologne").
