= Jean Jacoby =

Luxembourgish artist

Olympic medal record

Art competitions
Gold medal – first place	1924 Paris	Painting
Gold medal – first place	1928 Amsterdam	Drawings

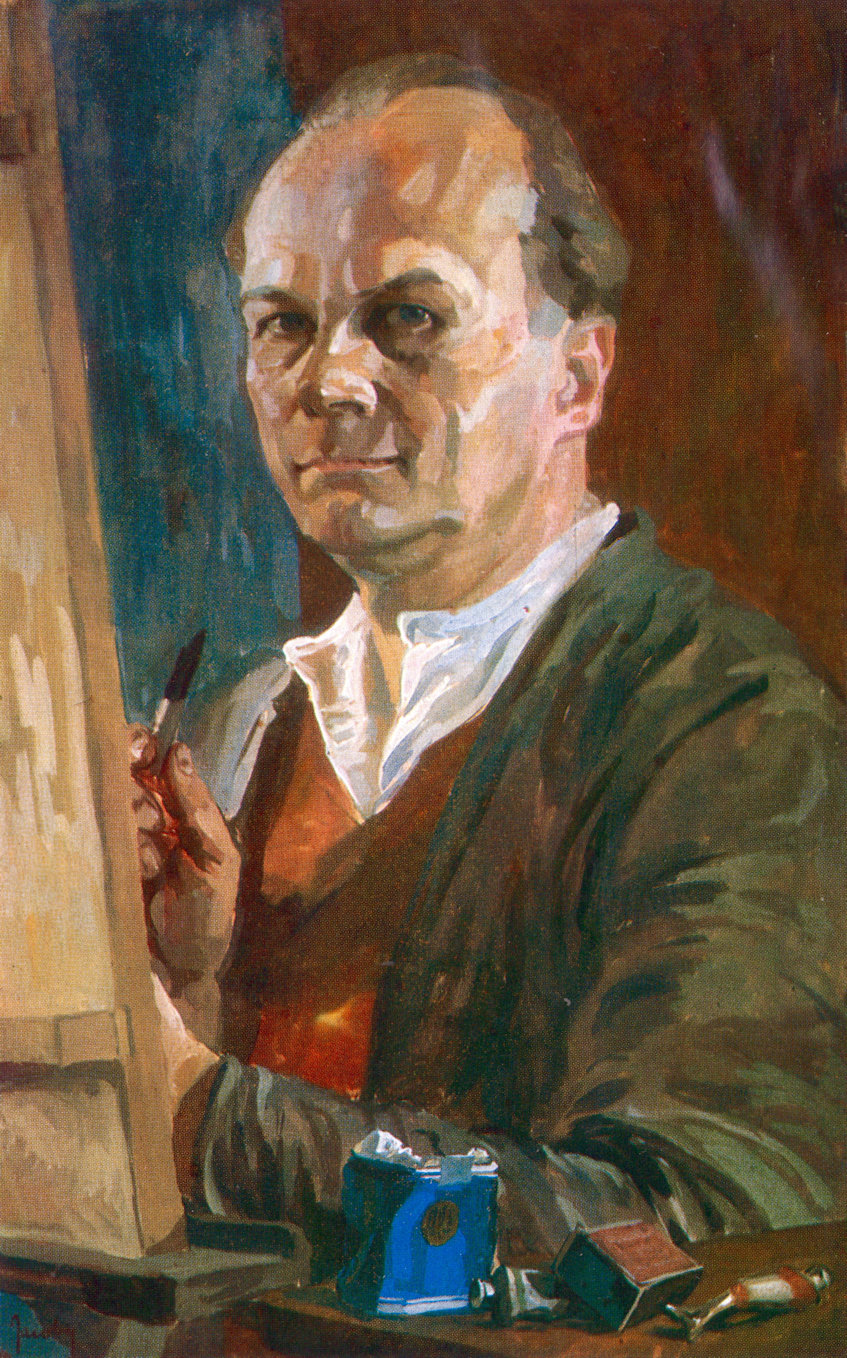
Self-portrait (1935)

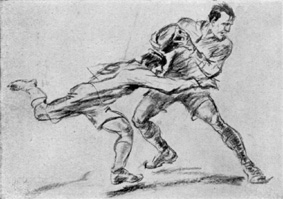
The drawing Rugby earned Jacoby a gold medal in 1928.

Jean Lucien Nicolas Jacoby (March 26, 1891 – September 9, 1936) was a Luxembourgish artist. He won Olympic gold medals in the Olympic art competitions of 1924 and 1928, making him the most successful Olympic artist ever.

== Life ==
After spending his youth in Molsheim in Alsace, Jean Jacoby studied art at the École des Beaux-Arts in Strasbourg. He was then a teacher of drawing from 1912 to 1918 at the Lewin-Funcke school in Berlin, then worked in Wiesbaden, before taking over the art department of a printing firm in Strasbourg.

He became internationally known when in 1923 he won the French Concours de l'Auto with his drawing Hurdle runner, beating 4,000 other entrants. Jacoby often depicted sports in his works, also designing Luxembourg postage stamps for the 1952 Summer Olympics. He himself was featured on a Luxembourg postage stamp in 2016.

From 1926 to 1934 he worked as an illustrator and artistic director for two newspapers of the Ullstein-Verlag, the Berliner Illustrierte and the Grüne Post. He also founded a radio programme guide for all of Germany, called Sieben Tage.

In 1934 he moved to Mulhouse, where he died in 1936 of a heart attack. His second wife was Maria née Kasteleiner.
