= Josef Petersen =

Danish writer (1881–1973)

Medal record

Art competition

Representing Denmark

Olympic Games
| Silver medal – second place | 1924 Paris | Literature |
| Silver medal – second place | 1932 Los Angeles | Literature |
| Silver medal – second place | 1948 London | Epic works |

Josef Petersen (16 September 1881 – 22 November 1973) was a Danish author, known for many novels with historical motifs, often ancient or medieval, written from 1910 to 1949.

Josef Petersen was the son of a vicar and was a maternal grandson of the Norwegian poet Johann Sebastian Welhaven. Petersen, who worked as a journalist and foreign correspondent, has never been fully recognized by Danish literary historians, though his work was respected by contemporary critics for its knowledge of and empathy with ancient cultures. His best known book is Kongeofret ("The Royal Sacrifice") of 1923 with Asian motifs, and his Columbus novel En Verden stiger af Havet ("A World Rises from the Sea") of 1935 is also notable.

Petersen took a special interest in athletics and sport. He was a participant in the last Danish duel in 1913. He won three silver Olympic medals in art for his prose-lyric tales with Ancient Greek athletic themes: Euryale in 1924, Argonauterne ("The Argonauts") in 1932 and Den Olympiske Mester ("The Olympic Champion") in 1948).

== Sources ==
- The Games of the Xth Olympiad Los Angeles 1932 (PDF). Xth Olympiade Committee of the Games of Los Angeles, U.S.A. 1932. 1933. pp. 748–765. Archived from the original (PDF) on 2008-04-10.
- Wagner, Juergen. "Olympic Art Competition 1932". Olympic Games Museum. Archived from the original on 2008-05-01.
- Kramer, Bernhard (May 2004). "In Search of the Lost Champions of the Olympic Art Contests" (PDF). Journal of Olympic History. 12 (2): 29–34. Archived (PDF) from the original on 2008-04-10.
- Evans, Hilary; Gjerde, Arild; Heijmans, Jeroen; Mallon, Bill; et al. "Josef Petersen". Olympics at Sports-Reference.com. Sports Reference LLC. Archived from the original on 2020-04-17.
