= Art competitions at the Summer Olympics =

- IOC Code: ART
- Events: 14 (mixed)

Summer Olympics
- 1896; 1900; 1904; 1908; 1912; 1920; 1924; 1928; 1932; 1936; 1948; 1952; 1956; 1960; 1964; 1968; 1972; 1976; 1980; 1984; 1988; 1992; 1996; 2000; 2004; 2008; 2012; 2016; 2020; 2024; 2028; 2032
- Medalists

Art competitions formed part of the modern Olympic Games during its early years, from 1912 to 1948. The competitions were part of the original intention of the Olympic Movement's founder, Pierre de Frédy, Baron de Coubertin. Medals were awarded for works of art inspired by sport, divided into five categories: architecture, literature, music, painting, and sculpture, which led to the events' initial moniker of "Pentathlon of the Muses".

The juried art competitions halted after a 1949 decision by the IOC that since the majority of art contestants worked as professional artists, the competitions contradicted the Olympic spirit of amateur competition, which was more strictly enforced for athletes. Art exhibitions replaced the competitions in the following years, and since 1956, host nations have organized Cultural Olympiads at their own discretion.

== History ==
With the founding of the International Olympic Committee (IOC) in 1894, and the celebration of the first modern Olympic Games, French Baron Pierre de Coubertin saw the fulfillment of his ideals—men being educated in both mind and body, and competing in sport rather than war. One of his other desires was to combine both art and sport, and he thus considered including artistic competition in the Olympic Games.

De Coubertin became the driving force for promoting the arts through the Olympics, and in 1904, he wrote the following in the French newspaper Le Figaro: "The time has come to take the next step, and to restore the Olympiad to its original beauty. In the high times of Olympia, the fine arts were combined harmoniously with the Olympic Games to create their glory. This is to become reality once again."

Support for the art competitions grew, and in May 1906, Baron de Coubertin organised a meeting in Paris for both IOC members and representatives of artists' organisations. The meeting ended with a proposal to the IOC to organise artistic competitions at the Olympic Games in five areas (architecture, literature, music, painting, and sculpture). The works of art entered had to be inspired by sports.

Preparations were underway to hold such competitions at the 1908 Summer Olympics, which were scheduled for Rome, Italy. But the Italian organisers faced severe difficulties due to the Vesuvius volcano eruption of 1906, which forced them to halt preparations, and the IOC awarded the organisation to London in 1907. The British organisers planned to hold the art competitions, but because of the short preparation time, they were cancelled. The organisers felt that artists would not have enough time to send in their works.

Pierre de Coubertin was not discouraged, and sought to include the artistic events in the programme of the 1912 Summer Olympics, to be held in Stockholm, Sweden. Although the Swedes initially objected, opposing the idea of art combined with competition, they eventually gave in. The number of entrants was rather disappointing: only 35 artists are known to have sent works of art to Sweden, but gold medals were awarded in all five categories.

The 1916 Olympics were planned in Berlin, but World War I caused the events to be cancelled. Coubertin lobbied hard to host the games despite the war, trying to invoke the ancient Greek concept of "Ekeheiria" (laying down of arms). During the ancient Greek games, this sacred truce allowed for free travel and participation in the Games regardless of conflicts. Coubertin believed that continuing with the Games as planned in Berlin would possibly contribute to a halt in the war. However, opposition to Germany as the host proved too strong, and governments were not willing to pause the conflict. Thus, the 1916 Games were cancelled.

When the first post-war Olympic Games were held in war-ravaged Belgium, art contests were again on the programme, though it wasn't until the 1924 Summer Olympics in Paris that the arts were featured prominently. The contests were taken seriously for the first time, and 193 artists submitted works, which included three Russian émigré artists. The Soviet Union officially did not take part in the Olympic Games, which they considered to be a "bourgeois" festival.

The growth continued at the 1928 Amsterdam Olympics, where over 1,100 works of art were exhibited in the Municipal Museum, not including the submissions in literature, music and architecture. Artists were allowed to sell their works at the close of the exhibition, which was rather controversial given the IOC's amateurism policy, which required all competitors to be amateurs. In Amsterdam, the number of events was also increased, as four of the five fields of art were subdivided, creating more events.

Because of the economy and the remote location of Los Angeles, participation in the athletic events of the 1932 Games was lower than that of 1928. The art competition did not suffer from this problem, and the number of art works entered remained stable. Their exhibition drew 384,000 visitors to the Los Angeles Museum of History, Science and Art. Art contests were also held in Berlin (1936) and London (1948), with reasonable success, although the number of entered works had significantly dropped by 1948.

In 1949, a report was presented at the IOC meeting in Rome concluded that since practically all contestants in the art competitions were professionals, the competitions should be abolished and replaced with an exhibition without awards or medals. This sparked a heated debate within the IOC. At a 1951 meeting, the IOC decided to reinstate the competitions for the 1952 Olympics in Helsinki. However, the organisers claimed there was insufficient time, and an art competition was not held. An art exhibition took place in its stead.

The issue continued to be debated within the Olympic Movement, and at the 49th IOC Session in Athens, 1954, the IOC members voted to replace the art contests with an exhibition for future Olympics. Several attempts have been made to re-include them, but without success.

Despite no longer holding art competitions, the Olympic games continue to be connected with art exhibitions. The Olympic Charter required organisers of the Olympic Games to include a programme of cultural events, to "serve to promote harmonious relations, mutual understanding and friendship among the participants and others attending the Olympic Games."

Many of the art winners and entries have been lost to time. Two famous works that historians have been unable to find include "A Rider’s Instructions to His Lover" by the German poet Rudolf Binding, which won the silver medal in literature at the 1928 Amsterdam Games, and "Before the Gods of Olympia" by the French rugby player Charles Gonnet. Many architectural designs have also been lost.

== Competition ==
Specific rules and categories of the art competitions varied between each of the Olympic Games, but the core guidelines remained the same. All of the entered works had to be inspired by sport, and had to be original (that is, not be published before the competition). Like in the athletic events at the Olympics, gold, silver, and bronze medals were awarded to the highest ranked artists, although not all medals were awarded in each competition. On a few occasions, in fact, no medals were presented at all.

Generally, it was permitted for artists to enter multiple works, although a maximum number was sometimes established. This made it possible for an artist to win multiple prizes in a single competition.

At one time or another, there were suggestions to also include dancing, film, photography, or theatre, but none of these art forms was ever included in the Olympic Games as a medal event. However, breakdancing was included in the Paris 2024 Olympics.

=== Architecture ===
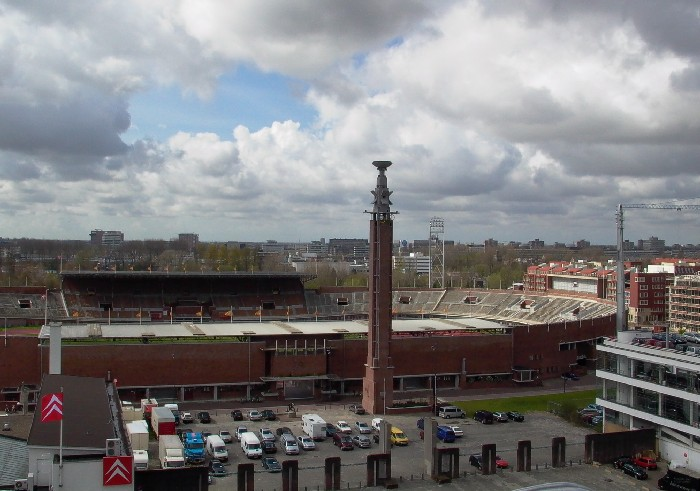
The 1928 Olympic Stadium, designed by Jan Wils, won the gold medal in architecture at the 1928 Olympics.

Until the Amsterdam Games in 1928, the architectural competition was not divided into categories. The 1928 games introduced a town planning category. However, the division was not always clear, and some designs were awarded prizes in both categories.

Entries in this category were allowed to have been "published" before the Olympics. A notable example of this is the 1928 gold medal for architecture awarded to Jan Wils for his design of the Olympic Stadium used in the same Olympics.

=== Literature ===
The literature competitions were divided into a varied number of categories. Until 1924 and again in 1932, there was only a single literature category. In 1928, separate categories were introduced for dramatic, epic, and lyric literature. Awards in these categories were also presented in 1948, while the drama category was dropped in 1936. Entered works were limited in length (20,000 words) and could be submitted in any language, provided they were accompanied by English and/or French translations or summaries (rules varied over the years).

Because of the requirement that literary entries had to be about sport, the competition failed to attract most of the leading poets and writers of the time. Coubertin later wrote that most writers were “wholly unfamiliar with the joys of violent muscular effort” and that they were thus “incapable of describing them for a public that was not very familiar with them either”.

=== Music ===
A single event for music was held until 1936, when three categories were introduced: one for orchestral music, one for instrumental music, and one for both solo and choral music. In 1948, these categories were slightly modified into choral/orchestral, instrumental/chamber, and vocal music.

The juries often had trouble judging the pieces, which were entered on paper. Possibly related to the problematic judging, juries frequently decided to award only a few prizes. On two occasions, no award was given out at all: in the 1924 music category and in the 1936 instrumental music category.

1936 marked the only occasion when the winning musical works were actually played before an audience.

=== Painting ===
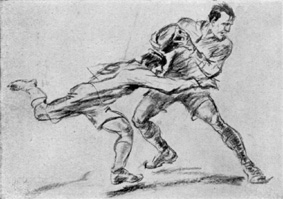
Jean Jacoby is the only artist to win two gold medals. He won his second with the above drawing, titled Rugby.

As with the other art forms, a single painting category was on the program until 1928, when it was split out into three sub-categories: drawings, graphic arts, and paintings. The categories then changed at each of the following Olympic Games. In 1932, the three categories were: paintings, prints, and watercolors/drawings. Four years later, the prints category disappeared and got replaced by graphic arts and commercial graphic art. At the final Olympic art competition, the three categories were applied arts and crafts, engravings/etchings, and oils/water colours.

=== Sculpture ===
The sculpture class had only a single category until 1928, when two separate competitions were designated; one for statues and one for reliefs and medals. In 1936, this was split up further, separating reliefs and medals into their own sub-categories.

== Notable competitors ==
While several of the Olympic art medalists have achieved at least national fame, few of them can be considered well-known artists globally. In fact, the 1924 Games featured better-known jury members than artists, with artists like Selma Lagerlöf and Igor Stravinsky judging the entered works.

Judging by the medals won, Luxembourg painter Jean Jacoby is the most successful Olympic artist, winning the gold medal for his 1924 painting Étude de Sport, and for his drawing Rugby in 1928. Swiss artist Alex Diggelmann won three medals, a gold one in 1936 (for his poster Arosa I Placard), and a silver and a bronze in the 1948 applied arts & crafts class, both with commercial posters. Danish writer Josef Petersen won a silver medal on three occasions: in 1924, 1932, and 1948. Jack Butler Yeats won silver in 1924 for his painting "Natation" (Swimming), giving him the distinction of being Ireland's first medallist at the Olympic Games in the wake of the creation of the Irish Free State. Yeats was the brother of literary giant William Butler Yeats and the son of John Butler Yeats, a successful portrait painter.

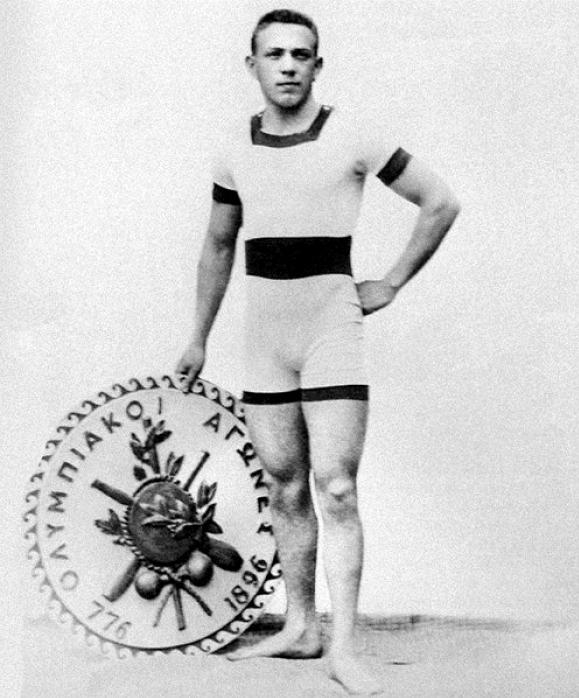
Alfréd Hajós is one of only two Olympians to have won medals in both sport and art competitions

Only two persons have won Olympic medals in both sport and art competitions. Walter W. Winans, an American who lived in England, won a gold medal as a marksman at the 1908 Summer Olympics in the running deer (double shot) competition. In 1912, he won another shooting medal—silver this time—in the running deer team competition, and at those same Olympic Games, he won a gold medal for his sculpture An American trotter. The other Olympian with successes in both fields is Alfréd Hajós of Hungary. As a swimmer, he won two gold medals at the 1896 Athens Olympics. Swimming competitions took place in the ocean at the time, and during the competition, the water was extraordinarily cold with waves almost four meters high. Twenty-eight years later, he was awarded a silver medal in architecture for his stadium design, co-designed with Dezső Lauber.

Josef Suk and John Weinzweig are two of the best-known musicians to have competed, winning silver medals in 1932 and 1948 respectively. Polish composer Grażyna Bacewicz only earned an honourable mention at the London Olympics in 1948, but she went on to become one of her nation's most celebrated musicians with a statue of her being one of the seven artists depicted at the Philharmonic Hall is Bydgoszcz.

One of the most famous sculptors to win was Paul Landowski, whose statue "The Boxer" won a gold medal at the art competitions at the 1928 Summer Olympics. He later went on to create the famous Christ the Redeemer statue in Rio de Janeiro as well as over 35 monuments around the city of Paris.

Two presidents of the International Olympic Committee have also been among the entrants in the Olympic art competitions. In 1912 Pierre de Coubertin, under the pseudonym "Georges Hohrod and Martin Eschbach", entered Ode to sport, which won a gold medal in literature. Avery Brundage, who competed as an athlete at the 1912 Games, entered literary works at the 1932 and 1936 Olympics, earning an honorary mention in 1932. He later served as the IOC's president from 1952 to 1972.

Britain's John Copley, winner of a silver medal in the 1948 engravings and etchings competition, was 73 years of age, making him the oldest Olympic medallist in history. The oldest Olympic medallist outside the art competitions is Swedish shooter Oscar Swahn, who won his last medal at age 72 during the 1920 Summer Olympics.

== All-time medal table (1912–1948) ==
In 1952, art competition medals were removed from the official national medal counts. However, at least since June 2021, the art competitions medals are again taken into account by the IOC in the medal tables for the relevant Olympics.

Art competitions all-time medal table
Rank	Nation	Gold	Silver	Bronze	Total
1	Germany (Note: Pierre de Coubertin's entry in Literature, Ode to sport, at the 1912 Summer Olympics was submitted by the pseudonym of "Georges Hohrod" and "Martin Eschbach" from Germany, even though he is French. Despite the subsequent resolving of his identity, the gold medal is officially still awarded and attributed to Germany, according to the pseudonym and the country under which the work was submitted.)	8	7	9	24
2	Italy	5	7	2	14
3	United States	4	5	0	9
4	France	4	4	5	13
5	Great Britain	3	5	1	9
6	Austria	3	3	3	9
7	Poland	3	2	3	8
8	Finland	3	1	1	5
9	Switzerland	2	4	1	7
10	Belgium	2	1	5	8
11	Netherlands	2	1	3	6
12	Luxembourg	2	1	0	3
13	Sweden	2	0	2	4
14	Hungary	1	2	1	4
15	Greece	1	0	0	1
16	Denmark	0	5	4	9
17	Czechoslovakia	0	1	2	3
17	Ireland	0	1	2	3
19	Canada	0	1	1	2
19	South Africa	0	1	1	2
21	Norway	0	1	0	1
22	Japan	0	0	2	2
23	Monaco	0	0	1	1
Totals (23 entries)		45	53	49	147

=== Winners by Olympics ===
- Stockholm 1912 (5)
- Antwerp 1920 (5)
- Paris 1924 (5)
- Amsterdam 1928 (13)
- Los Angeles 1932 (9)
- Berlin 1936 (15)
- London 1948 (14)

== See also ==
- Jeux de la Francophonie
- List of LGBT artists at the Olympic Games
- Participation of women in the Olympics

== Sources ==
- Stanton, Richard (2001). The Forgotten Olympic Art Competitions. Victoria: Trafford Publishing. ISBN 1-55212-606-4. (Book in French) Guillain Jean-Yves, Art & Olympisme. Histoire du concours de peinture, Paris, Atlantica, 2004. ISBN 2-84394-763-4.
- Kramer, Bernhard (May 2004). "In Search of the Lost Champions of the Olympic Art Contests" (PDF). Journal of Olympic History. 12 (2): 29–34. Archived (PDF) from the original on 10 April 2008.
- Wagner, Juergen. "Olympic Art Competitions / Contests 1912–1948". Olympic Games Museum. Archived from the original on 16 February 2008.
- Bergvall, Erik, ed. (December 1913). The Olympic Games of Stockholm 1912 Official Report (PDF). Stockholm: Wahlström and Widstrand. pp. 806–811. Archived from the original (PDF) on 10 April 2008.
- Olympic Games Antwerp 1920 — Official Report (PDF) (in French). Belgian Olympic Committee. 1957. p. 80. Archived from the original (PDF) on 8 April 2008.
- M. Avé, Comité Olympique Français (ed.). Les Jeux de la VIII^{e} Olympiade Paris 1924 - Rapport Officiel (PDF) (in French). Paris: Librairie de France. pp. 601–612. Archived from the original (PDF) on 10 April 2008.
- G. van Rossem, ed. (1928). The Ninth Olympiad. Amsterdam 1928. Official Report (PDF). Amsterdam: J. H. de Bussy. pp. 877–901. Archived from the original (PDF) on 8 April 2008.
- The Games of the Xth Olympiad Los Angeles 1932 (PDF). Xth Olympiade Committee of the Games of Los Angeles, U.S.A. 1932. 1933. pp. 748–765. Archived from the original (PDF) on 10 April 2008.
- Diem, Carl (1937). XIth Olympic Games, Berlin 1936 Official Report (PDF). Berlin: Wilhelm Limpert. pp. 1106–1123. Archived from the original (PDF) on 6 April 2008.
- Cecil, David, ed. (1951). The Official Report of the Organising Committee for the XIV Olympiad (PDF). London: Organising Committee for the XIV Olympiad. pp. 535–537. Archived from the original (PDF) on 8 April 2008.
