= Georges Dubois =

Georges Dubois may refer to:

- Georges Dubois (geologist) (1890–1953), French geologist
- Georges Dubois (gymnast), French Olympic gymnast
- Georges Dubois (hurdler) (died 1934), French Olympic hurdler
- Georges Dubois (military) (1896–1971), officer of the Free French forces, Companion of the Liberation
- Georges Dubois (parasitologist) (1902–1993), Swiss parasitologist
- Georges Dubois (sculptor) (1865–1934), French sculptor
- Georges Dubois (skier) (born 1935), Swiss Olympic cross-country skier
- Georges-Pierre Dubois (1911–1983), Swiss architect
