= Reformation Wall =

Swiss monument inaugurated 1909

Coordinates: 46°12′01″N 6°08′44″E

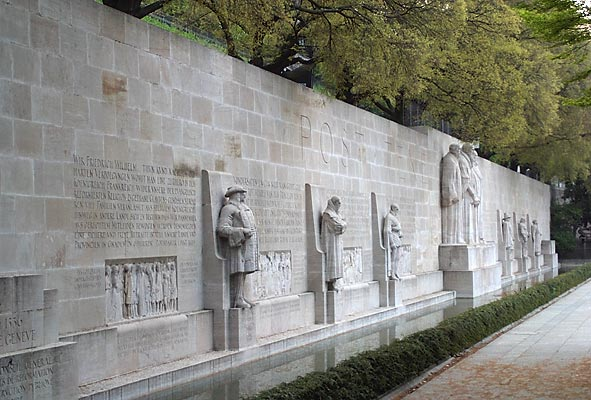
The Reformation Wall stretches for 100 m, depicting numerous Protestant figures from across Europe.

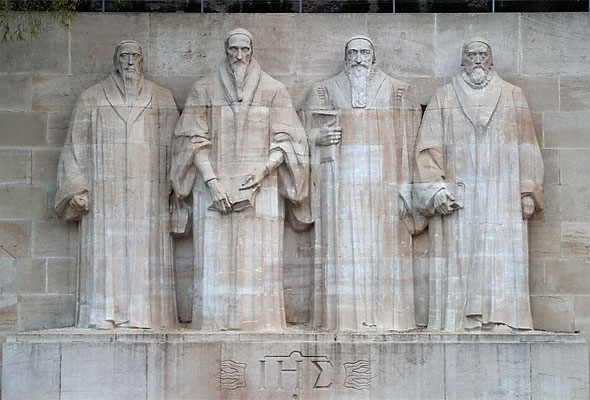
At its heart are statues to William Farel, John Calvin, Theodore Beza, and John Knox. The Christogram can be seen below the statues.

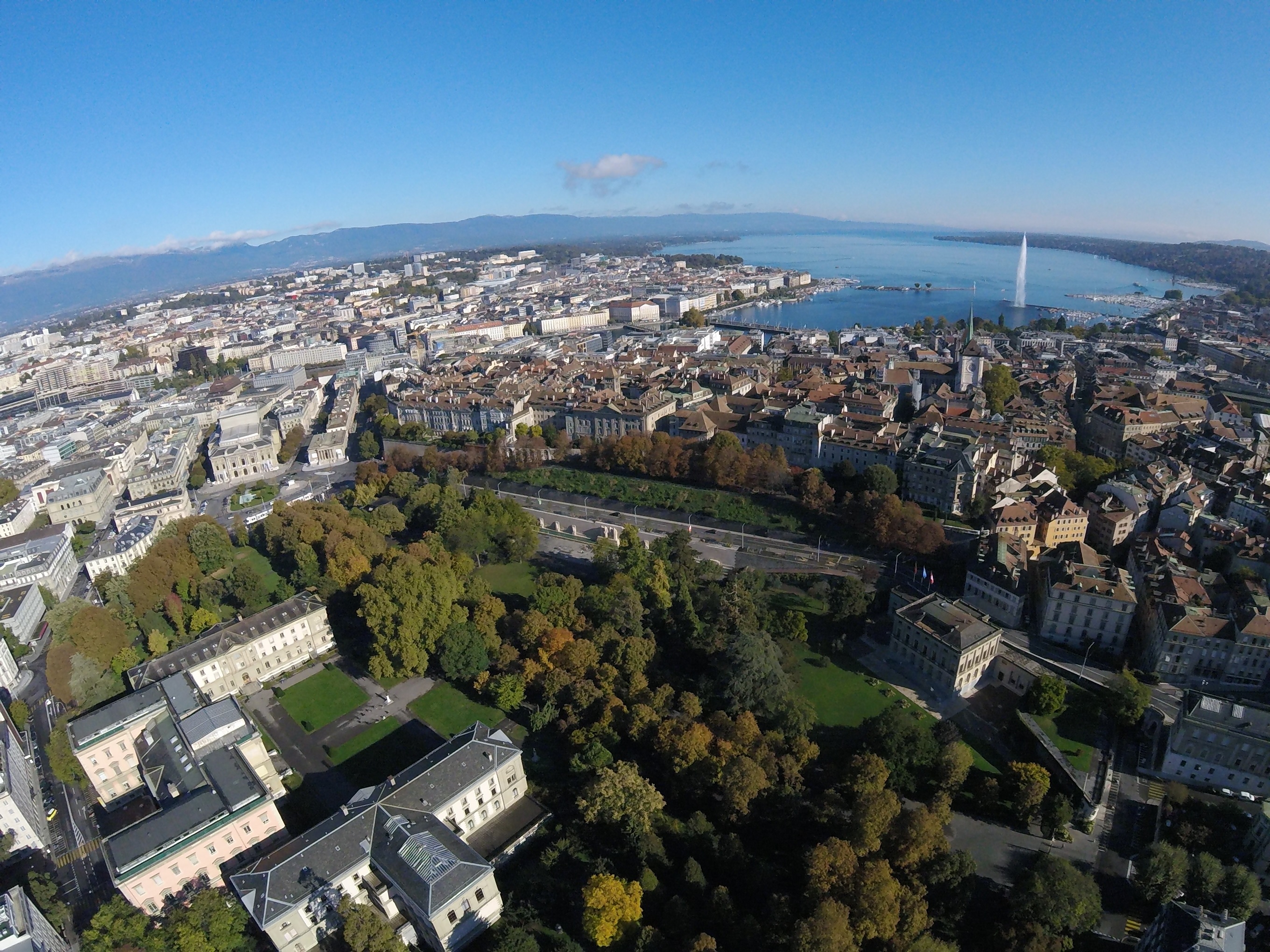
The International Monument to the Reformation, aerial view

The International Monument to the Reformation (French: Monument international de la Réformation; German: Internationales Reformationsdenkmal), usually known as the Reformation Wall (French: Mur des réformateurs), was inaugurated in 1909 in Geneva, Switzerland. Key individuals, events, and documents of the Protestant Reformation are depicted therein in statues and bas-reliefs.

The Wall is in the grounds of the University of Geneva, which was founded by John Calvin, and was built to commemorate the 400th anniversary of Calvin's birth and the 350th anniversary of the university's establishment. It is built into the old city walls, and the monument's location there is designed to represent the integral importance of the fortifications, and therefore of the city of Geneva, to the Reformation.

The monument was the culmination of a contest launched to transform that part of the park. The contest involved 71 proposals from around the world, and was won by four Swiss architects: Charles Dubois, Alphonse Laverrière, Eugène Monod, and Jean Taillens (whose other design came third). The sculptures were then created by two French sculptors: Paul Landowski and Henri Bouchard.

During the Reformation, Geneva was the centre of Calvinism, and its history and heritage since the sixteenth century has been closely linked to that of Protestantism. Due to the close connections to that theology, the individuals most prominently depicted on the Wall were Calvinists; nonetheless, key figures in other theologies are also included.

At the centre of the monument, four 5-metre-tall (16 ft) statues of Calvinism's main proponents are depicted:

- William Farel (1489–1565)
- John Calvin (1509–1564)
- Theodore Beza (1519–1605)
- John Knox (c.1513–1572)

To the left (facing the Wall, ordered from left to right) of the central statues are 3-metre-tall (9.8 ft) statues of:

- Frederick William of Brandenburg (1620–1688)
- William the Silent (1533–1584)
- Gaspard de Coligny (1519–1572)

To the right (ordered from left to right) are 3-metre-tall (9.8 ft) statues of:

- Roger Williams (1603–1684)
- Oliver Cromwell (1599–1658)
- Stephen Bocskai (1557–1606)

Along the wall, to either side of the central statues, is engraved the motto of both the Reformation and Geneva: Post Tenebras Lux (Latin for After darkness, light). On the central statues' pedestal is engraved a Christogram: ΙΗΣ.

The monument gave inspiration to one of the most important 20th-century Hungarian poems, written by Gyula Illyés in 1946 under the title Before the Monument of Reformation in Geneva.

== See also ==
- Plainpalais
