= Théâtre du Peuple =

Theater in Bussang, France

Coordinates: 47°52′56″N 6°50′50″E

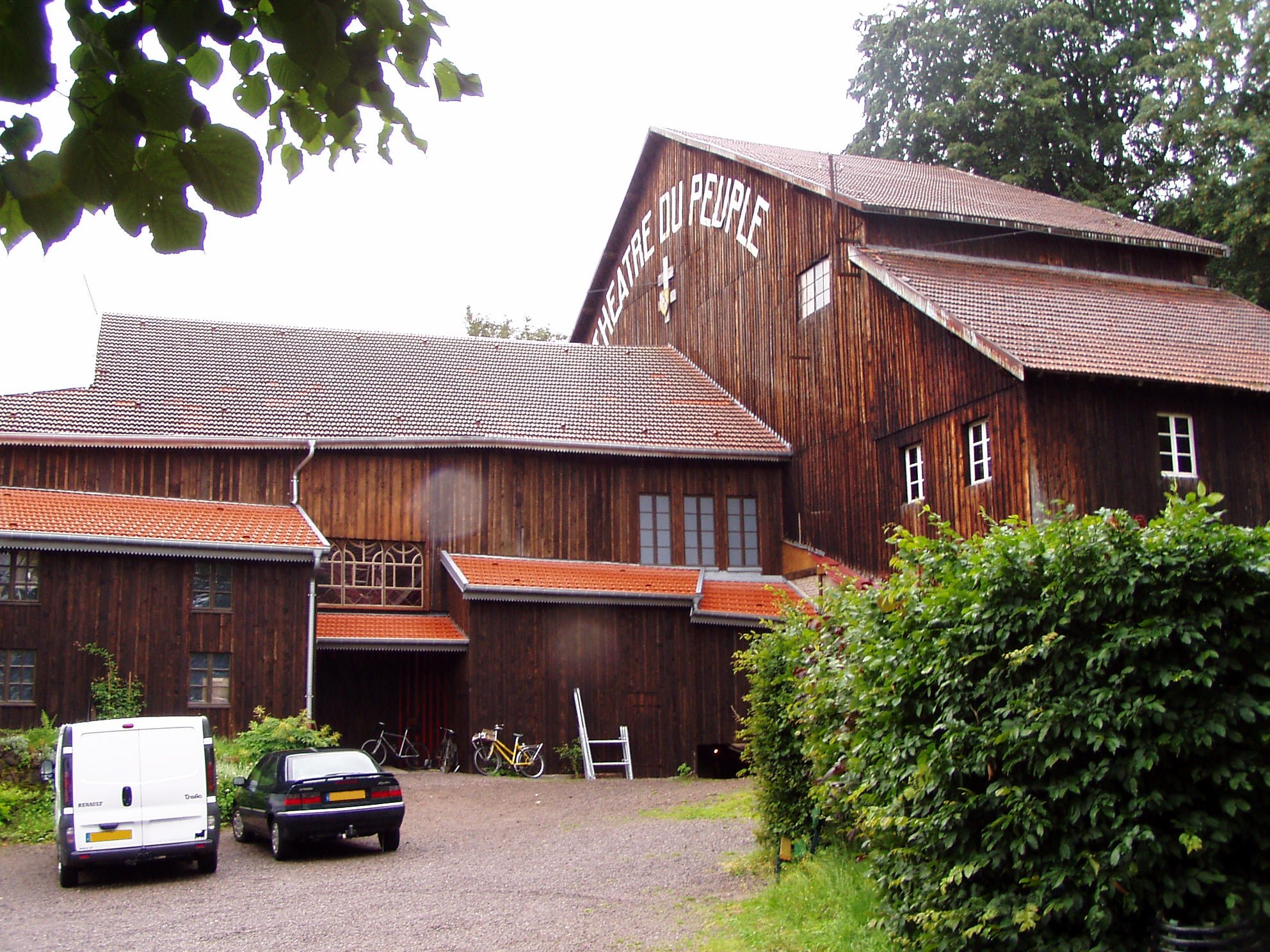
Théâtre du Peuple

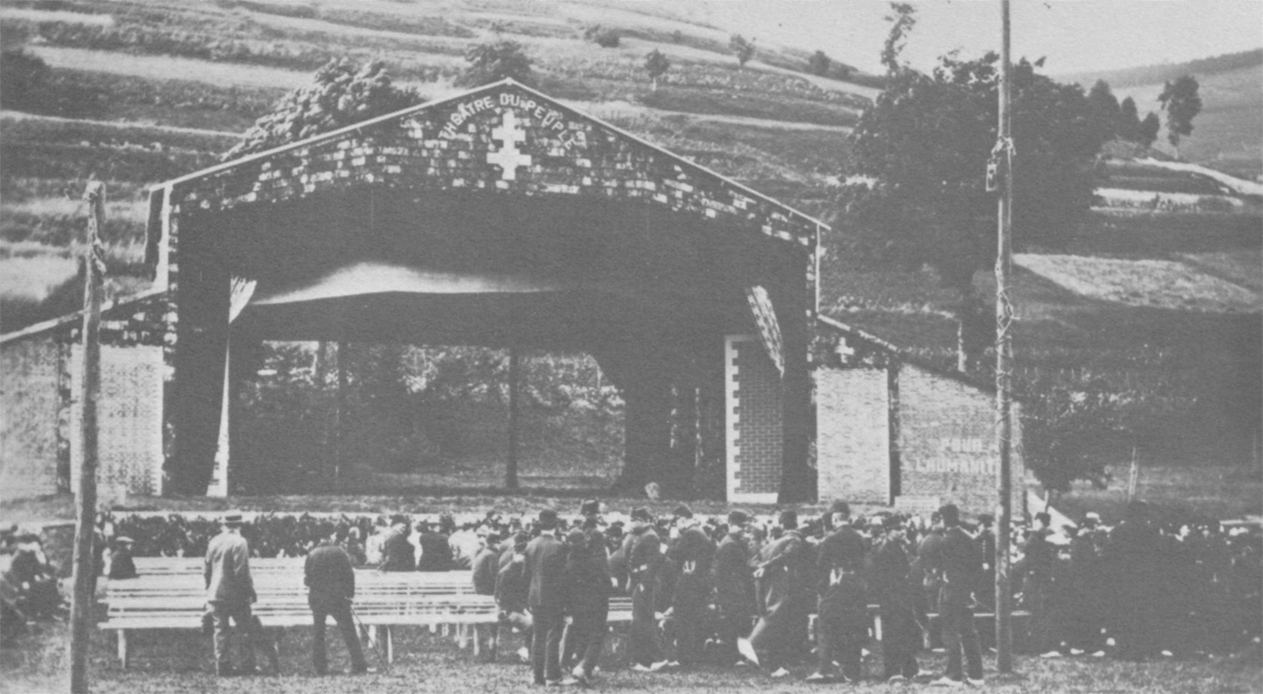
The Théâtre du peuple at Bussang in 1895.

The Théâtre du peuple is a theater located in Bussang, France, built in 1895 by Maurice Pottecher.

The theatre was added to the list of historical monuments in 1975 and is always in activity, putting on a new performance each year. Performances take place on every Sunday of July and August.

The Théâtre du peuple is constructed entirely of wood and can seat up to 1,200 people.

The Théâtre du peuple was the first people's theatre to be established in France after the Revolution. Originally it was an open-air theatre, in which Pottecher staged folk and morality plays, often performed by locals in dialect. Its low costs, low ticket prices and the offer of a free performance per season proved a successful formula for Sunday-afternoon theatre. Pottecher used his success as a platform to launch a people's theatre campaign (soon taken up by Nobel-prize winner Romain Rolland). The proscenium arch of the theatre bore the motto "Through Art for Humanity". Pottecher worked at the Théâtre du Peuple until his death in 1960, after which members of his family continued the tradition. Its current director is Pierre Guillois.

== Works cited ==
- Bradby, David, and John McCormick. 1978. People's Theatre. London: Croom Helm and Totowa, NJ: Rowman and Littlefield. ISBN 0-8476-6073-7.
