= Jacob Rees =

Jacob Rees may refer to:

- Jacob Rees-Mogg, British politician
- Jacob Rees (architect), British architect
