= Art competitions at the 1912 Summer Olympics =

Art competitions at the Olympics

Art competitions at the Games of the V Olympiad
- Art competitions pictogram
- Venue: Karlavägen 10, Stockholm
- Dates: 5 May – 27 July 1912
- No. of events: 5
- Competitors: 34 from 10 nations

Art competitions were held as part of the 1912 Summer Olympics in Stockholm, Sweden. It was the first time that art competitions were part of the Olympic program. Medals were awarded in five categories (architecture, literature, music, painting, and sculpture), for works inspired by sport-related themes.

Art competitions were part of the Olympic program from 1912 to 1948, but were discontinued due to concerns about amateurism and professionalism. Since 1952, a non-competitive art and cultural festival has been associated with each Games.

== Medal summary ==
Category	Gold	Silver	Bronze
Architecture	Eugène-Edouard Monod and Alphonse Laverrière (SUI); Building plan of a modern stadium	none awarded	none awarded
Literature	Georges Hohrod & Martin Eschbath (GER) (Note: Pierre de Coubertin's entry, Ode to sport in Literature, was submitted by the pseudonym of "Georges Hohrod" and "Martin Eschbach" from Germany, even though he is French. Despite the subsequent resolving of his identity, the gold medal is officially still awarded and attributed to Germany, according to the pseudonym and the country under which the work was submitted.) "Ode to Sport"	none awarded	none awarded
Music	Riccardo Barthelemy (ITA) "Olympic Triumphal March"	none awarded	none awarded
Painting	Carlo Pellegrini (ITA); Three connected friezes representing "Winter Sports"	none awarded	none awarded
Sculpture	Walter Winans (USA); Bronze statuette "An American trotter"	Georges Dubois (FRA); Model of the entrance to a modern stadium	none awarded

== Medal table ==
In 1952, art competition medals were removed from the official national medal counts. However, at least since June 2021, the art competitions medals are again taken into account by the International Olympic Committee (IOC) in the medal tables for the relevant Olympics.

Rank	NOC	Gold	Silver	Bronze	Total
1	Italy	2	0	0	2
2	Germany	1	0	0	1
2	Switzerland	1	0	0	1
2	United States	1	0	0	1
5	France	0	1	0	1
Totals (5 entries)		5	1	0	6

== Events summary ==
=== Architecture ===
The following architects took part:

Rank	Name	Country
1	Alphonse Laverrière, Eugène-Édouard Monod	Switzerland
AC	A. Laffen	Unknown
AC	André Collin	France
AC	Frantz Jourdain	France
AC	Fritz Eccard	Unknown
AC	Guillaume Fatio	Switzerland
AC	Jacob Rees	Great Britain
AC	Julius Skarba-Wallraf	Germany
AC	Konrad Hippenmeier	Switzerland

=== Literature ===
The following writers took part:

Rank	Name	Country
1	Georges Hohrod & Martin Eschbach	Germany
AC	Gabriele D'Annunzio	Italy
AC	Marcel Boulenger	France
AC	Maurice Pottecher	France
AC	Gabriel Letainturier-Fradin	France
AC	Paul Adam	France
AC	René Morax	Switzerland

=== Music ===
The following composers took part:

Rank	Name	Country
1	Riccardo Barthelemy	Italy
AC	Ethel Barnard	Great Britain
AC	Gustave Doret	Switzerland
AC	Max d'Ollone	France
AC	Émile Jaques-Dalcroze	France

=== Painting ===
The following painters took part:

Rank	Name	Country
1	Carlo Pellegrini	Italy
AC	Ernest Townsend	Great Britain
AC	Ferdinand Gueldry	France
AC	Jean François Raffaëlli	France

=== Sculpture ===
The following sculptors took part:

Rank	Name	Country
1	Walter Winans	United States
2	Georges Dubois	France
AC	Otakar Španiel	Bohemia
AC	Tait McKenzie	Canada
AC	Rembrandt Bugatti	Italy
AC	Victor Segoffin	France
AC	Paolo, Prince Trubetskoy	Russia
AC	Antoni Wiwulski	Congress Poland

== Sources ==
- Bergvall, Erik, ed. (December 1913). The Olympic Games of Stockholm 1912 Official Report (PDF). Stockholm: Wahlström and Widstrand. pp. 806–811. Archived (PDF) from the original on 10 April 2008.
- Wagner, Juergen. "Olympic Art Competition 1912". Olympic Games Museum. Archived from the original on 17 April 2008.
- Kramer, Bernhard (May 2004). "In Search of the Lost Champions of the Olympic Art Contests" (PDF). Journal of Olympic History. 12 (2): 29–34. Archived (PDF) from the original on 10 April 2008.
- "Stockholm 1912: Did you know?". International Olympic Committee. Archived from the original on 8 April 2008.
