= Konrad Hippenmeier =

Swiss architect

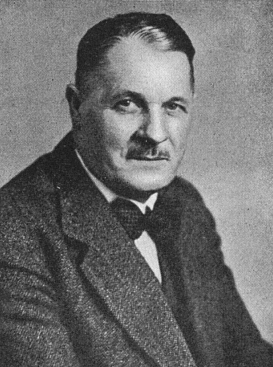
- Born: 5 June 1880
- Died: 10 April 1940 (aged 59); Zürich, Switzerland
- Occupation: Architect

Konrad Hippenmeier (5 June 1880 – 10 April 1940) was a Swiss architect. His work was part of the architecture event in the art competition at the 1912 Summer Olympics.
