= Parc de Milan =

Public park in Lausanne, Switzerland

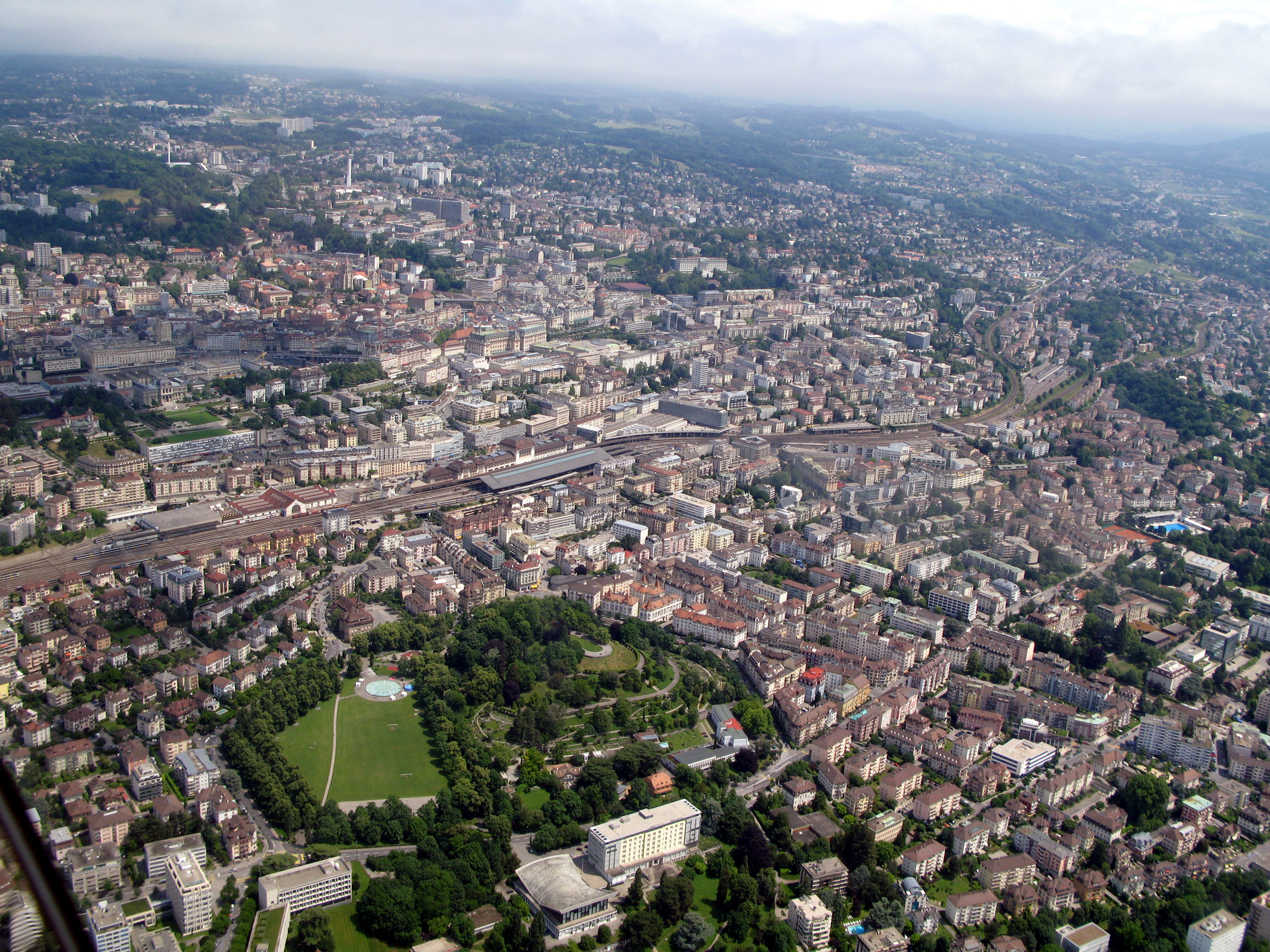
- View of Lausanne. The Parc de Milan and the Cantonal Botanical Museum and Gardens are at bottom, left of center.

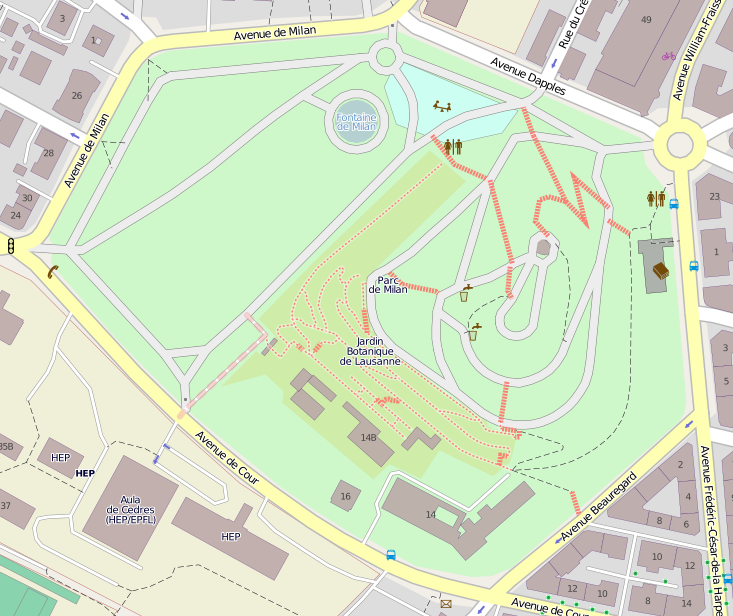
- Location: Lausanne, Switzerland
- Coordinates: 46°30′50″N 6°37′23″E
- Website: www.lausanne.ch

The Parc de Milan is a public park of the city of Lausanne, Switzerland.

The Parc de Milan and the Cantonal Botanical Museum and Gardens form a vast park located between Lausanne railway station and Lake Léman.
