= Ferdinand Gueldry =

French painter (1858–1945)

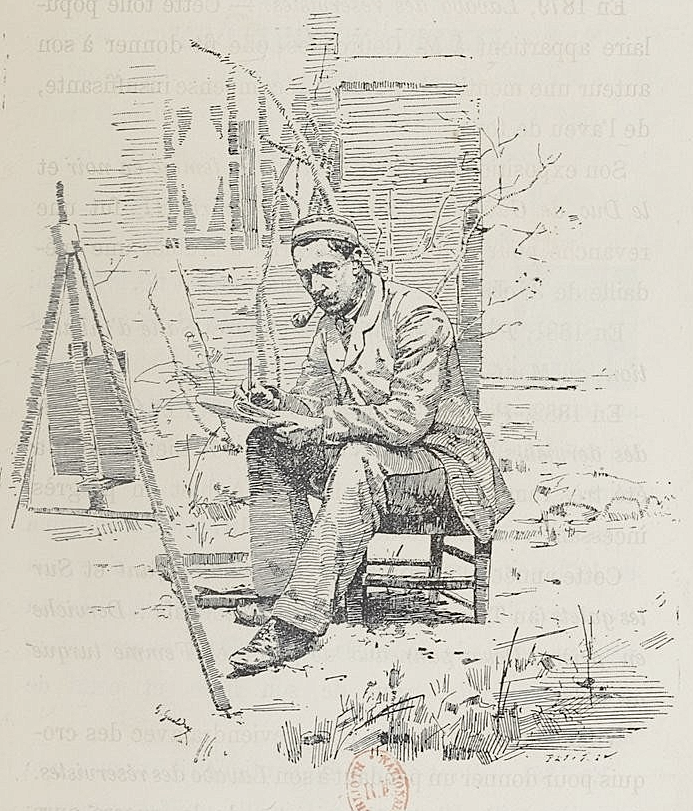
- Gueldry: self-portrait, 1883
- Born: 21 May 1858; Paris, France
- Died: 17 February 1945 (aged 86); Lausanne, Switzerland
- Occupation: Painter
- Style: 19th Century European, Victorian and British Impressionist Art

Joseph Ferdinand Gueldry (21 May 1858 – 17 February 1945) was a French painter. He studied under Jean-Léon Gérôme at École des Beaux-Arts in Paris. Gueldry debuted his artwork at 20 years old in 1878 at the yearly Paris Salon exhibit, and continued to be featured there regularly until 1933. That same year he was also awarded the Chevalier de la Légion d'Honneur. His work was part of the painting event in the art competition at the 1912 Summer Olympics. As a founding member of the Nautical Society at Marne in Joinville-le-Pont (Société Nautique de Marne) and an avid rower his paintings often depict rowing, regattas and maritime themes. His work is still relevant, with the painting Launching the boat sold for US$150,731 in 2017.
