= Guillaume Fatio =

Swiss architect

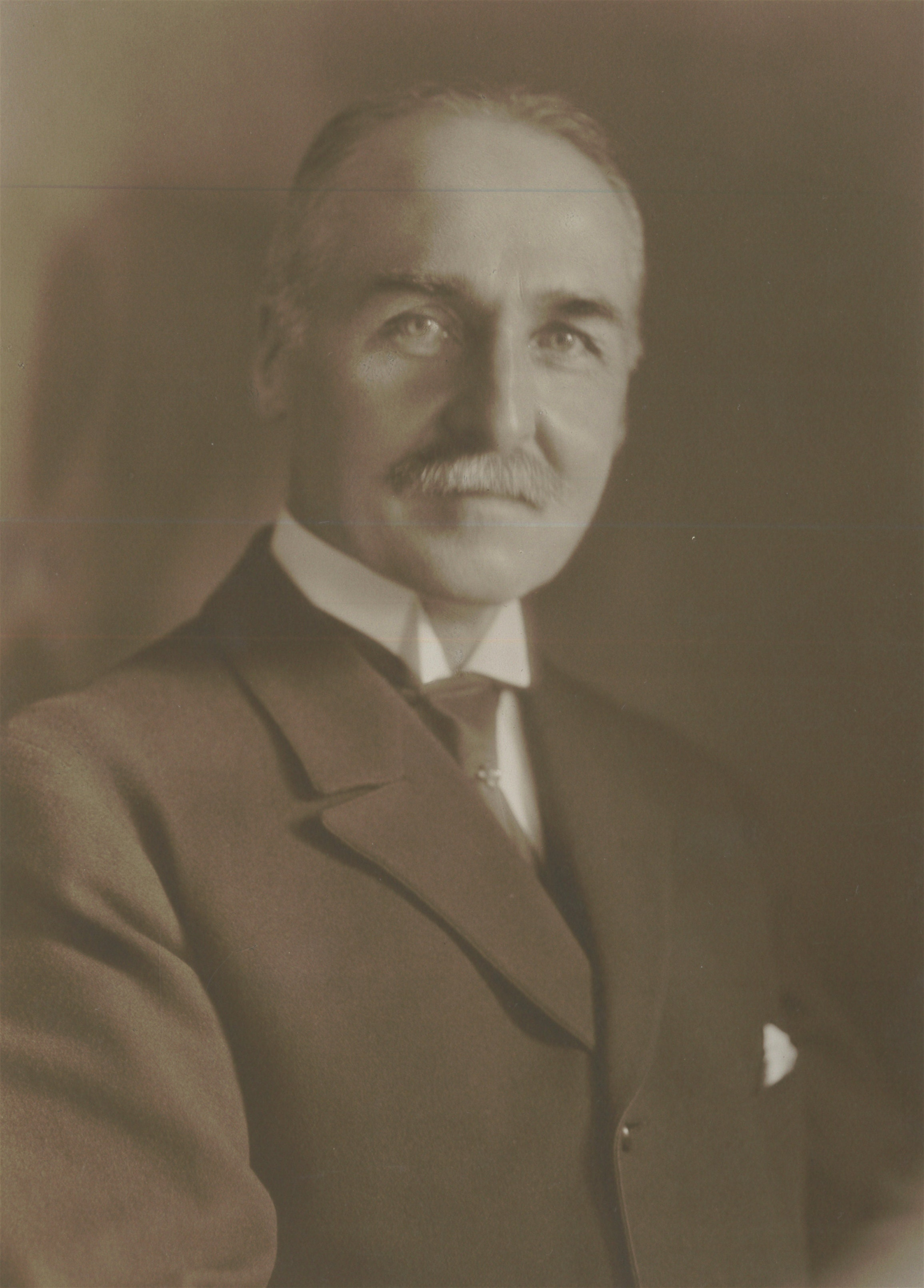
- Guillaume Fatio in 1955
- Born: 11 September 1865; Geneva, Switzerland
- Died: 4 June 1958 (aged 92); Genthod, Switzerland
- Occupation: Architect

Guillaume Fatio (11 September 1865 – 4 June 1958) was a Swiss architect. His work was part of the architecture event in the art competition at the 1912 Summer Olympics.
