= Carlo Pellegrini (19th-century painter) =

Italian painter (1866–1937)

- Born: 25 October 1866; Albese con Cassano, Italy
- Died: 5 September 1937 (aged 70); Albese con Cassano, Italy
- Occupation: Painter

Olympic medal record

Art competitions
Gold medal – first place	1912 Stockholm	Painting

Carlo Pellegrini (25 October 1866 – 5 September 1937) was an Italian painter. He won a gold medal at the 1912 Summer Olympics in the mixed painting section of the art competitions.
