= Julius Skarba-Wallraf =

German architect

- Born: 22 February 1883; Budapest, Austria-Hungary
- Died: 2 February 1943 (aged 59); Munich, Germany
- Occupation: Architect

Julius Skarba-Wallraf (22 February 1883 – 2 February 1943) was a German architect. His work was part of the architecture event in the art competition at the 1912 Summer Olympics.
