= Noyon Cathedral =

Roman Catholic church in Noyon, France

Noyon Cathedral Cathédrale Notre-Dame de Noyon
- Picard: Cathédrale Noter-Danme ed Noéyon
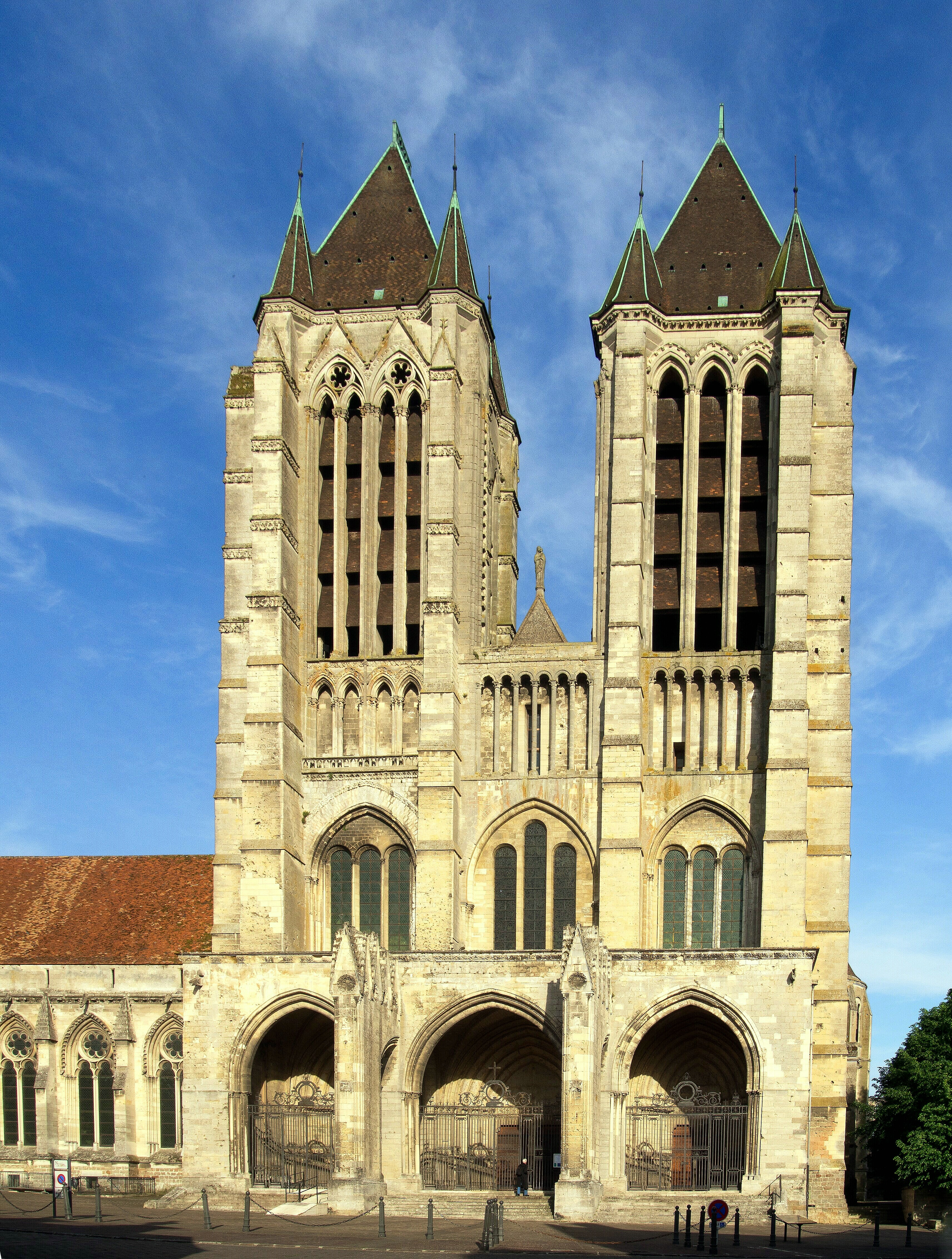
- Noyon Cathedral
- Noyon Cathedral; Cathédrale Notre-Dame de Noyon
- 49°34′56″N 3°0′2″E
- Location: Noyon, France
- Denomination: Roman Catholic Church
- Churchmanship: Roman

History
- Status: Former Cathedral

Architecture
- Functional status: Suppressed in 1790
- Architectural type: Church
- Style: Gothic, Gothic Revival
- Groundbreaking: 1145; 881 years ago
- Completed: 1230; 796 years ago

Specifications
- Height: 66 m (216 ft 6 in)
- Materials: Stone

Administration
- Province: Beauvais

Monument historique
- Official name: Cathédrale Notre-Dame de Noyon
- Type: Classé
- Designated: 1840
- Reference no.: PA00114786

Noyon Cathedral (French: Cathédrale Notre-Dame de Noyon; Picard: Cathédrale Noter-Danme ed Noéyon) is a Roman Catholic church and former cathedral, located in Noyon, France. It was formerly the seat of the Bishopric of Noyon, which was abolished by the Concordat of 1801 and merged into the Diocese of Beauvais. Constructed between 1145-1230, the Noyon Cathedral is considered to be one of the earliest true Gothic cathedrals built in France and has been listed as a Monument historique since 1840. The cathedral hosted a number of royal coronations, including Charlemagne and Hugh Capet, and later became the baptismal church of the Protestant reformer John Calvin. In the 19th and early 20th centuries, its architectural significance attracted the attention of prominent French artists and architects such as Eugène Viollet-le-Duc, and Auguste Rodin.

== History ==
=== Early History ===
The origins of the cathedral date as early as the 5th century, when Bishop Medardus moved his diocese seat from Vermand to Noyon to avoid conflicts between the Merovingian Franks and Burgundians, and constructed a small wooden chapel in the fortified Roman castrum. The church survived Germanic raids coinciding with the Fall of the Western Roman Empire in 476, but was left neglected for over 200 years following the transition to Merovingian power. Destroyed by fire in 676, the church was rebuilt and upgraded relatively quickly in Romanesque style and would later host the crowning of Charlemagne in 768. Following a second looting and destruction by Normans in 859, the cathedral was rebuilt and extended again as a Carolingian basilica in 882, according to Flodoard, and would host the crowning of Hugh Capet in 987 as the first Capetian monarch.

=== Middle ages-17th century ===
The Carolingian church was destroyed by fire in 1131, and construction of the current Gothic cathedral was ordered by Simon of Vermandois and Bishop Baudouin II, likely beginning shortly afterwards in 1145, as concluded by Ludovic Vitet and Eugène Viollet-le-Duc. Chronologically, it is the third Gothic cathedral built in France, after Sens Cathedral and Laon. Although funding was significantly reduced due to the diocese of Noyon becoming separated from Tournai, construction and planning were initiated relatively quickly. The moving of relics of Saint Godeberta and Saint Eligius into the unfinished building and the finishing of the radiating chapels in 1157 and 1167 helped raise funds for further construction, and by 1185, parts of the transept, bishop’s chapel, chevet, transept, and the eastern bays of the nave were completed. The plan of the choir was reproduced almost exactly to Saint-Germain-des-Prés and Saint-Denis, and the other features of the choir became influential for the development of other cathedrals around France, such as Notre-Dame de Paris. In 1230, the cloister was completed, followed shortly afterwards with the chapel house, marking the completion of the cathedral and allowing for its consecration in 1235. In 1293, a major fire broke out in the city, spreading to and severely damaging the cathedral. Reconstruction included extensive modifications such as the addition of new chapels on the north side, the construction of a west front porch, and the insertion of flying buttresses to support the tall choir. In addition, the original sexpartite rib vault was rebuilt in the prevailing quadripartite vault style, with additional soundproofing modifications. Unlike many other cathedrals in France, Noyon Cathedral was spared from complete destruction during the Hundred Years' War, but neglect during the conflict and labor shortages due to the Black Death pandemic necessitated major repairs until the late 15th century.

In the second half of the 15th century, a reconstruction campaign aimed at updating the cathedral with the prevailing Flamboyant Gothic and Renaissance architectural styles was initiated. Work first commenced on restoring the north tower of the apse, followed by the pillars of the choir bays, and the vaults of two bays of the south transept. In addition to these repairs, several vaults of the nave, the north tower of the facade and some flying buttresses were also repaired, and a half-timbered library and courthouse were built adjacent to the church. In 1509, Protestant reformer John Calvin, who was born across the street, was baptized inside the cathedral. Although Calvin would later become one of the leading figures of the Protestant Reformation, at the time of his baptism the cathedral was an important center of Catholicism in Picardy. During the Italian War of 1551–1559, Noyon was overrun by Spanish troops under Philip II, and the cathedral was left desecrated but not destroyed, allowing for repairs to commence shortly afterwards. In the early 18th century, a final restoration campaign between 1747 and 1753 modified the apse and the chancel, although one of the original episcopal chapels on the south side of the building damaged by fire in 1728 was left in its ruined state.

=== 18th-20th century ===
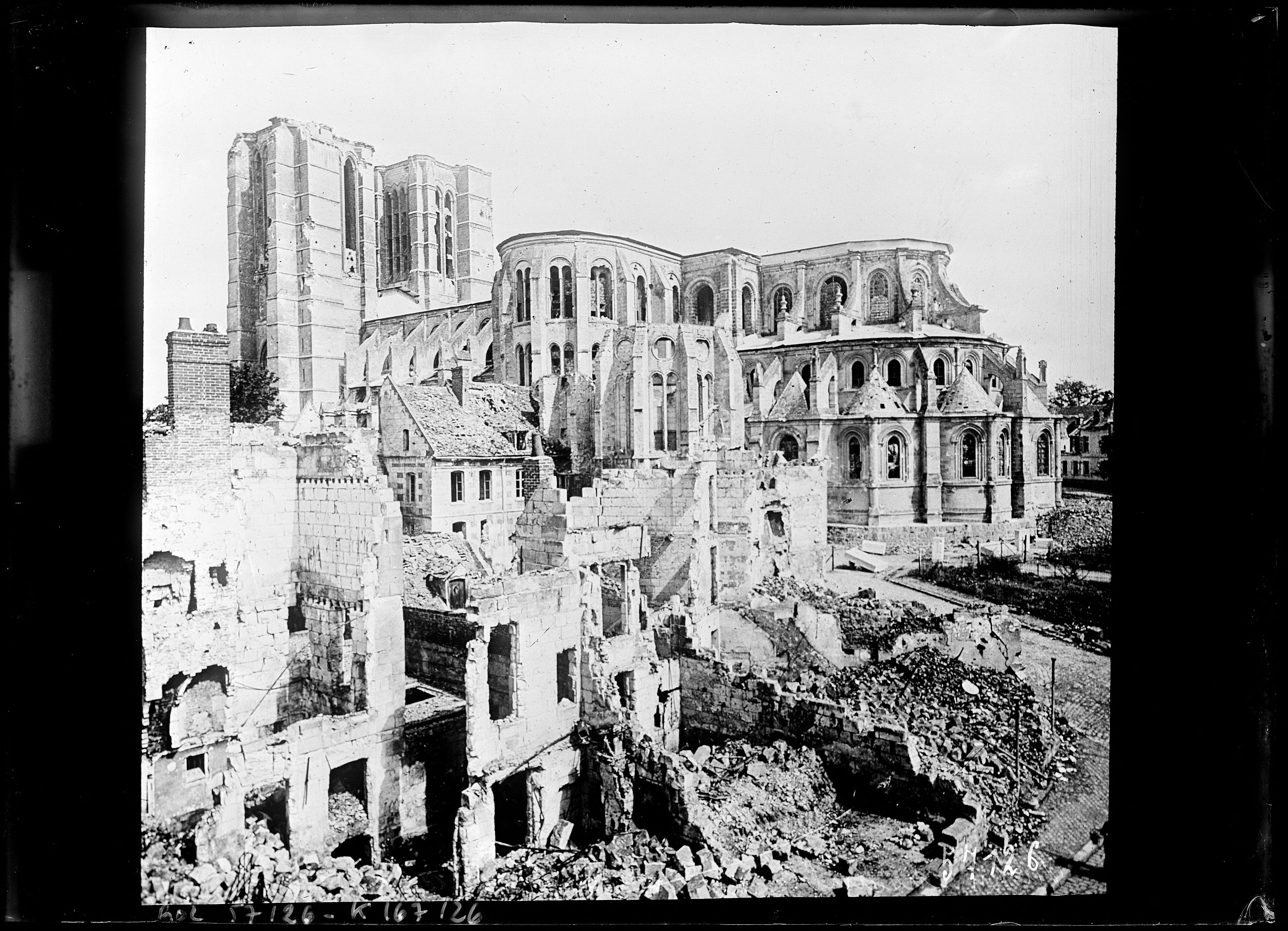
Photograph taken after World War I, showing the severe damage to the cathedral

The cathedral suffered heavy damage during the French Revolution in 1789, with most of the original statues, tympanum, furniture, and bishops' tombs desecrated or destroyed by revolutionary mobs. Following the Revolution, the bishopric was suppressed in 1790, and the cathedral was closed and ordered to be sold, a change associated with the Concordat of 1801. However, the price was later deemed too high for selling or converting into a Temple of Reason, and the building was instead turned into a mixed-use venue. During this time, the building was used as a barn, granary, stable, and dance hall, but in 1840 after being rediscovered and studied by numerous architects including Eugène Viollet-le-Duc, the cathedral received official protection as a Monument historique and underwent several campaigns aimed at restoring the structure to its original appearance. The first phase of work began in 1843, followed by a second phase between 1860 and 1872, which involved the rebuilding of the entire exterior of the apse and modification of the clerestory windows. The third phase, beginning in 1884, completely rebuilt the south transept and included additional historical protective listings that covered the cloister, chapter house and library. Around this same period, Scottish writer Robert Louis Stevenson visited Noyon and later mentioned the town and the cathedral in his novel, An Inland Voyage. In addition to repairs on the main building, the ruins of the chapel damaged by fire in 1728 were briefly restored by architect Paul Selmersheim to preserve a 17th century wine cellar beneath the building. During the early 20th century, the cathedral gained attention from prominent visiting artists and architects such as Auguste Rodin, who described the cathedral as "the most harmonious cathedral in the country".

Both the town and the cathedral suffered considerable damage from bombardment during World War I, intensifying in late 1917 during the German retreat to the Hindenburg Line. On April 1, 1918, a German bomb hit the cathedral, causing a fire that completely destroyed the wooden timber roof and apse vault. Although the towers did not collapse, most of the interior furniture, 17th century organ, and original remaining stained glass windows were destroyed. Shelling continued under the Hundred Days Offensive, further weakening the structure. Following the end of the war, restoration commenced under architect André Collin and lasted for 20 years until September 1938. Modifications included updating the building to fire code standards, such as replacing the former wooden beamed roof with a concrete structure, and rebuilding the vaulted nave and chapels, as well as the installation of a British memorial tablet inside the main building. During World War II, Noyon was severely damaged by Allied bombing, damaging the nearby birthplace home of Calvin, but remarkably sparing the cathedral. By 1956, significant postwar restoration was completed, making the building fully secure and functional for regular worship and allowing for its reopening.

== Features ==
=== Exterior ===
Noyon Cathedral is an example of a church constructed in the Second Stage Gothic style, which developed between 1130 and 1150. Construction took place before and after the change in Gothic style, resulting in a unique transitional building between Romanesque and Gothic architecture. The cathedral footprint is designed in the traditional form of a Latin cross, with a total length from east to west of about 105 m, as studied by Columbia University in 2016. The west front has a porch, added in the 14th century, and two unfinished towers, their upper portions dating from the 13th century; their decorations have been left mutilated since the French Revolution. The flying buttresses were restored in the 19th century in Neo-Gothic style. The cathedral is of an average size for its period, larger than Senlis Cathedral, but around the same dimensions of Laon Cathedral. During the 19th century, architect Eugène Viollet-le-Duc suggested that due to its proximity to Paris and similarities in architecture, the church may have been built by workmen reassigned after the completion of St. Denis Cathedral. With the exception of a few sculptures and carvings saved after the French Revolution and sold to collectors, very little of the original carvings on the tympanum and portal created by the Naumburg Master survive today. Two notable sculptures from the cathedral façade currently reside in the Metropolitan Museum of Art in New York City.

=== Interior ===
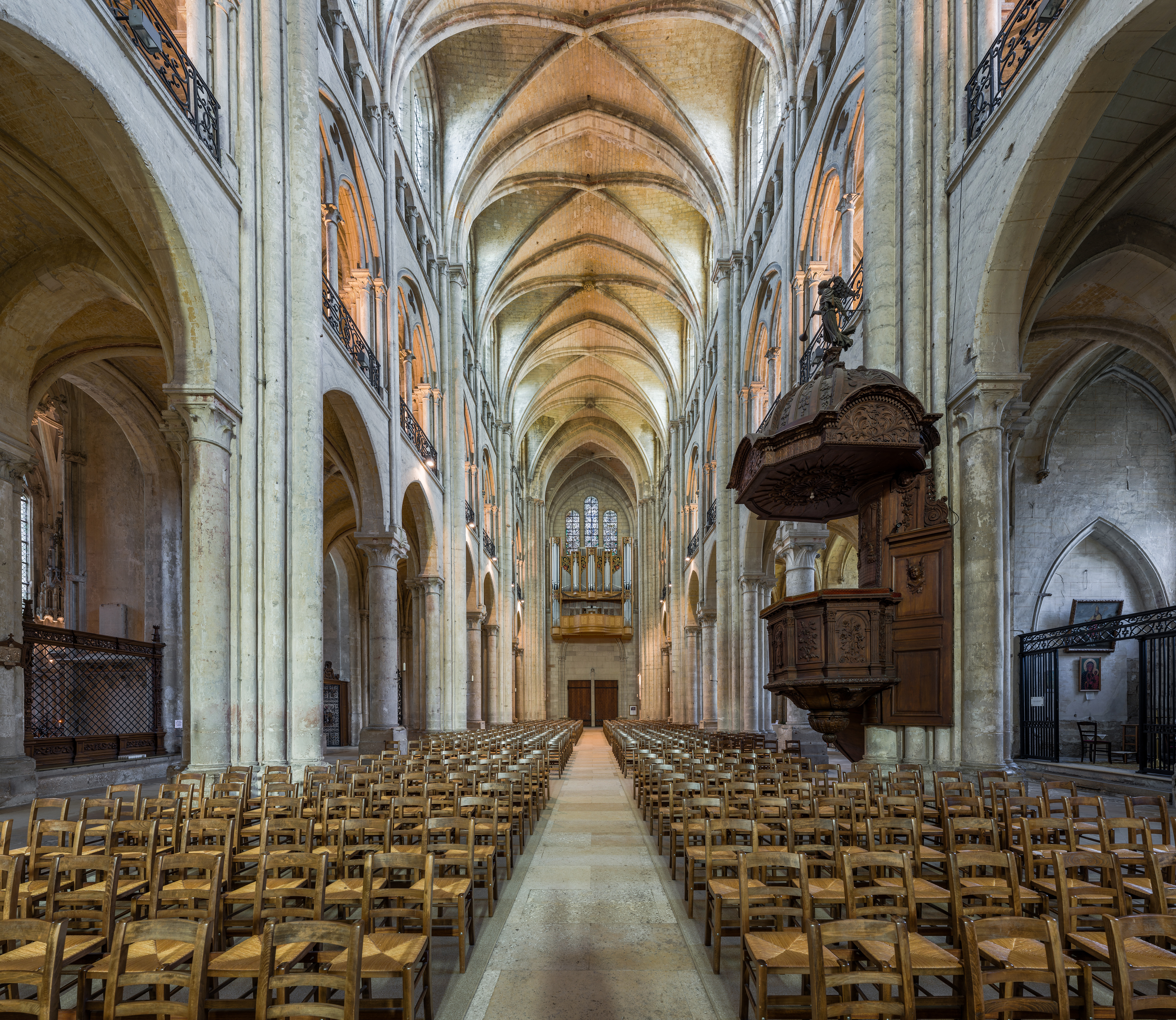
Nave of the Cathedral

The interior of the cathedral features a soaring quadripartite ribbed vaulted ceiling and sound-reflecting vault below the crossing of the cathedral's arms. Noyon was one of the first cathedrals constructed with four stories: an aisle arcade, gallery arcade, blind triforium, and clerestory. The cathedral's chevet features five radiating chapels of semi-circular design, each pierced by two windows and covered by five-ribbed vaults. These are preceded by four quadrangular chapels and served by an ambulatory that follows the contours of the sanctuary. While this elevation aligns with those of Saint-Germer-de-Fly Abbey and Laon Cathedral, the ground plan, conversely, serves as a direct reference to the chevet of Saint-Germain-des-Prés. The overall elevation also closely resembles that of Tournai Cathedral, with arches springing from columns in the nave. This is altered in the transepts, where there is an aisle arcade, blind triforium, and lower and upper clerestories, and the line of the respond extends all the way to the floor. The nave consists of eleven bays, including those of the west front, which, in the interior, forms a kind of transept, similar to some narthexes of English churches like Durham Cathedral. The windows of the aisles, arches of the triforium gallery, and the windows of the clerestory use round-headed arches, but double pointed arches appear in the lower gallery and in the vaults of the nave and aisles. The transepts have apsidal, semicircular terminations, and radiating side chapels were added in the north aisle in the 14th century and in the south aisle in the 15th and 16th centuries. A Pulpit was also added during the 16th century, and survives in the nave today. With the exception of two panels from the vestry depicting the life of Saint Pantaleon and smaller fragments incorporated into modern windows, none of the original medieval stained-glass windows survived the severe damage caused by historical conflicts, including the French Revolution and World War I. The 17th century organ was also destroyed in 1918 but was rebuilt in 1971. Similar to restorations done at Reims Cathedral and Chartres, the roof was reconstructed using fireproof materials after World War I, in this case, concrete, to replace the lost wooden structure. Shrapnel damage is still visible on the lower walls of the structure. Between 641 and 660, Noyon was evangelized by Saint Eligius, the Bishop of Noyon, who is currently buried under the altar.

=== Cloister ===
From the northwest corner of the nave runs the western gallery of a large Gothic cloister erected in 1230, complete with rib vaulting and a chapter house. Both the cloister and surrounding buildings survived the historical conflicts that repeatedly destroyed the main cathedral, including the French Revolution and World War I, although several sections of the original open-air arcades of the cloister were walled off in the 17th century.

== See also ==
- Early Gothic architecture
- List of Gothic cathedrals in Europe
