= Jean-François Raffaëlli =

French painter

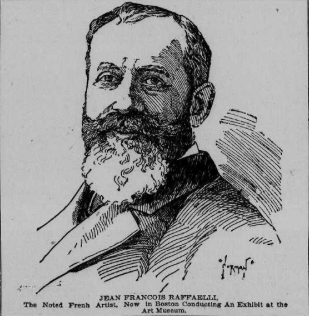
Portrait of Jean Francois Raffaelli in 1895

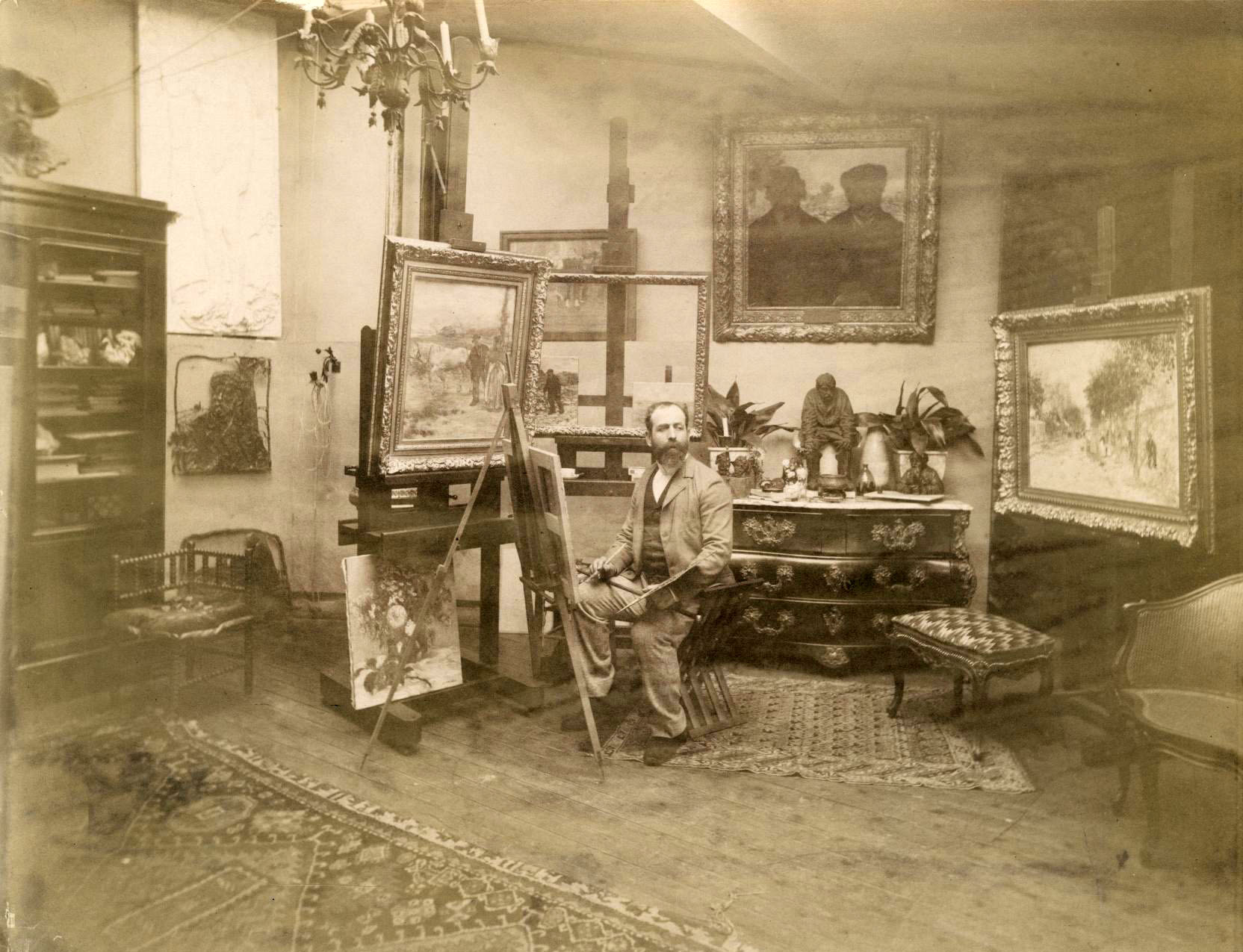
Jean-François Raffaëlli in his Paris studio.

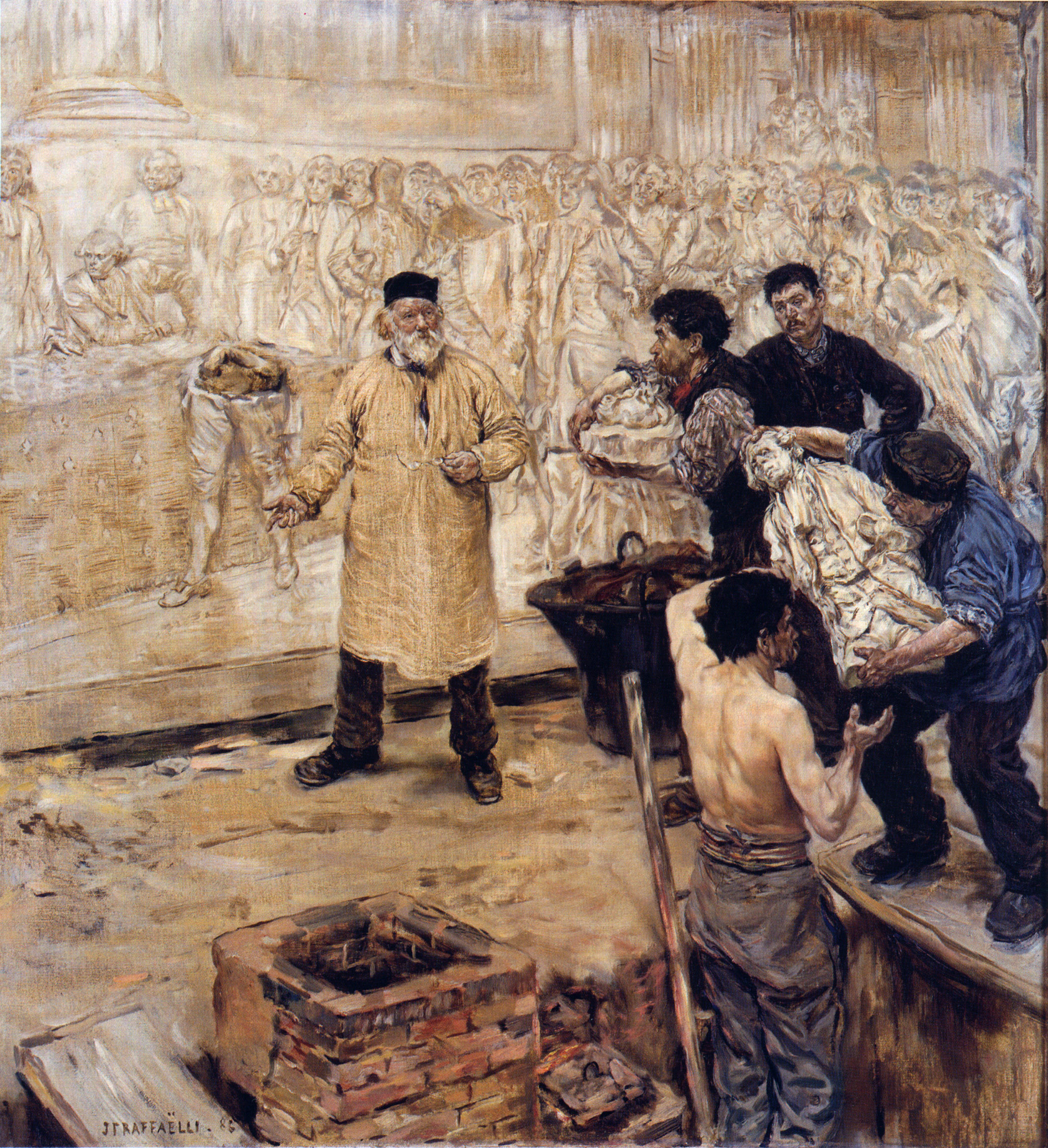
Jean-François Raffaëlli, At the caster's, 1886, oil on canvas, 128 x 116 cm, Musée des Beaux-Arts, Lyon

Jean-François Raffaëlli (April 20, 1850 – February 11, 1924) was a French realist painter, sculptor, and printmaker who exhibited with the Impressionists. He was also active as an actor and writer.

== Biography ==
Born in Paris, he was of Tuscan descent through his paternal grandparents. He showed an interest in music and theatre before becoming a painter in 1870. One of his landscape paintings was accepted for exhibition at the Salon in that same year. In October 1871 he began three months of study under Jean-Léon Gérôme at the École des Beaux-Arts in Paris; he had no other formal training.

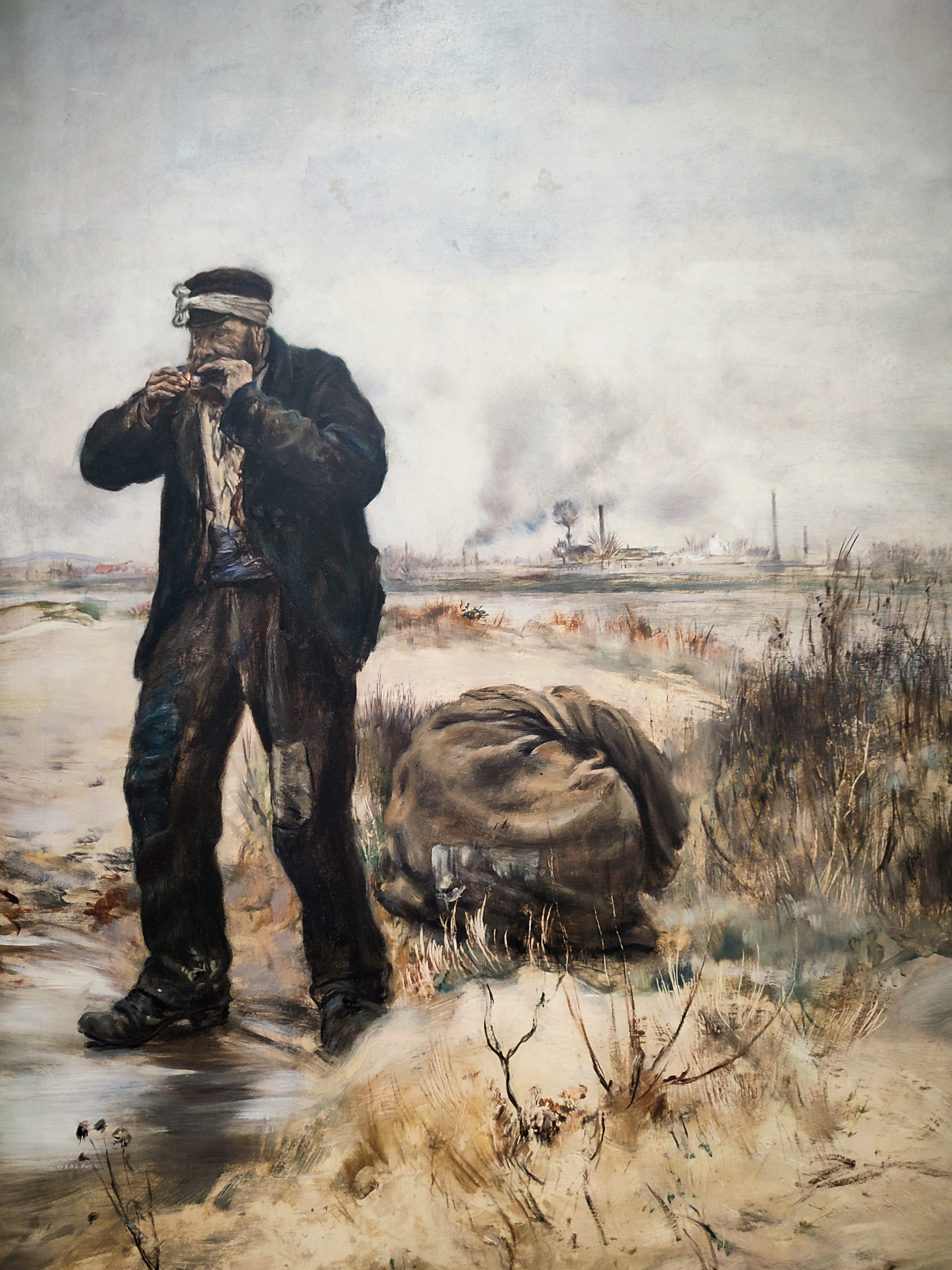
Painting by Jean-Francois Raffaëlli entitled A Ragman Lighting His Pipe

Raffaëlli produced primarily costume pictures until 1876, when he began to depict the people of his time—particularly peasants, workers, and ragpickers seen in the suburbs of Paris—in a realistic style. His new work was championed by influential critics such as J.-K. Huysmans, as well as by Edgar Degas.

The ragpicker became for Raffaëlli a symbol of the alienation of the individual in modern society. Art historian Barbara S. Fields has written of Raffaëlli's interest in the positivist philosophy of Hippolyte-Adolphe Taine, which:

led him to articulate a theory of realism that he christened caractérisme. He hoped to set himself apart from those unthinking, so-called realist artists whose art provided the viewer with only a literal depiction of nature. His careful observation of man in his milieu paralleled the anti-aesthetic, anti-romantic approach of the literary Naturalists, such as Zola and Huysmans.

Degas invited Raffaëlli to participate in the Impressionist exhibitions of 1880 and 1881, an action that bitterly divided the group; not only was Raffaëlli not an Impressionist, but he threatened to dominate the 1880 exhibition with his outsized display of 37 works. Monet, resentful of Degas's insistence on expanding the Impressionist exhibitions by including several realists, chose not to exhibit, complaining, "The little chapel has become a commonplace school which opens its doors to the first dauber to come along." An example of Raffaëlli's work from this period is Les buveurs d'absinthe (1881, in the California Palace of Legion of Honor Art Museum in San Francisco). Originally titled Les déclassés, the painting was widely praised at the 1881 exhibit.

After winning the Légion d'honneur in 1889, Raffaëlli shifted his attention from the suburbs of Paris to city itself, and the street scenes that resulted were well received by the public and the critics. He made a number of sculptures, but these are known today only through photographs. His work was also part of the painting event in the art competition at the 1912 Summer Olympics. In the later years of his life, he concentrated on color printmaking. Raffaëlli died in Paris on February 11, 1924.
