= Riccardo Barthelemy =

Italian composer and pianist

Olympic medal record

Art competitions
Gold medal – first place	1912 Stockholm	Music

Riccardo Barthelemy, also Richard Barthélemy (2 November 1869 – 23 January 1955), was an Italian composer and pianist.

== Biography ==
He was born in İzmir, Ottoman Empire. Barthelemy studied in San Pietro a Majella conservatory in Naples. His compositions included songs and stage works. He worked for 14 years as a répétiteur and piano accompanist with famous opera singer Enrico Caruso. In 1912 he won a gold medal in the art competitions of the Olympic Games for his "Marcia trionfale olimpica" ("Olympic Triumphal March").

== Works (musical) ==
- Caressing butterfly
- Love's wilfulness
- Adorables tourments
- Triste ritorno
- Chi se nne scorda cchiù?
- Pesca d'ammore
- Sérénade Coquette

== Works (literary) ==
- Memories of Caruso, translated by Constance S. Camner, with introduction by James Camner. Plainsboro, N.J.: La Scala Autographs, c1979
