= André Collin =

French architect (1875–1966)

- Born: 27 July 1875; Paris, France
- Died: 27 October 1966 (aged 91)
- Occupation: Architect

André Collin (27 July 1875 – 27 October 1966) was a French architect. He was Architecte en chef des Monuments historiques (1906–1944) and Inspecteur général des Monuments historiques (1938–1944) until his retirement in 1944.

In his work for Monuments Historiques, he was initially in charge of the areas of Doubs, La Haute-Saône, Landes, Gers and Basses-Pyrénées. From 1918 he was responsible for l'Oise and then Seine-Maritime from 1920. Collin's major restorations were for the Cathedral of Noyon (1919–39) and abbeys in Prémontré and Laon. His work was part of the architecture event in the art competition at the 1912 Summer Olympics. He is buried at the Père Lachaise Cemetery in Paris.
