= Eugène Monod =

Swiss architect (1871–1929)

- Born: Eugène-Édouard Monod; 16 June 1871; Morges, Switzerland
- Died: 9 November 1929 (aged 58)
- Occupation: Architect
- Design: Reformation Wall
- Sports career
Medal record
Art competitions
| Gold medal – first place | 1912 Stockholm | Architecture |

Eugène-Édouard Monod (16 June 1871 – 9 November 1929) was a Swiss architect.

In 1912 he won a gold medal together with Alphonse Laverrière in the art competitions of the Olympic Games. They created a "Building plan of a modern stadium". He was part of the architects team whose design for the Reformation Wall was chosen in 1908.
