= Musée et jardins botaniques cantonaux =

Botanical gardens and museum in Switzerland

Coordinates: 46.5134°N 6.6236°E

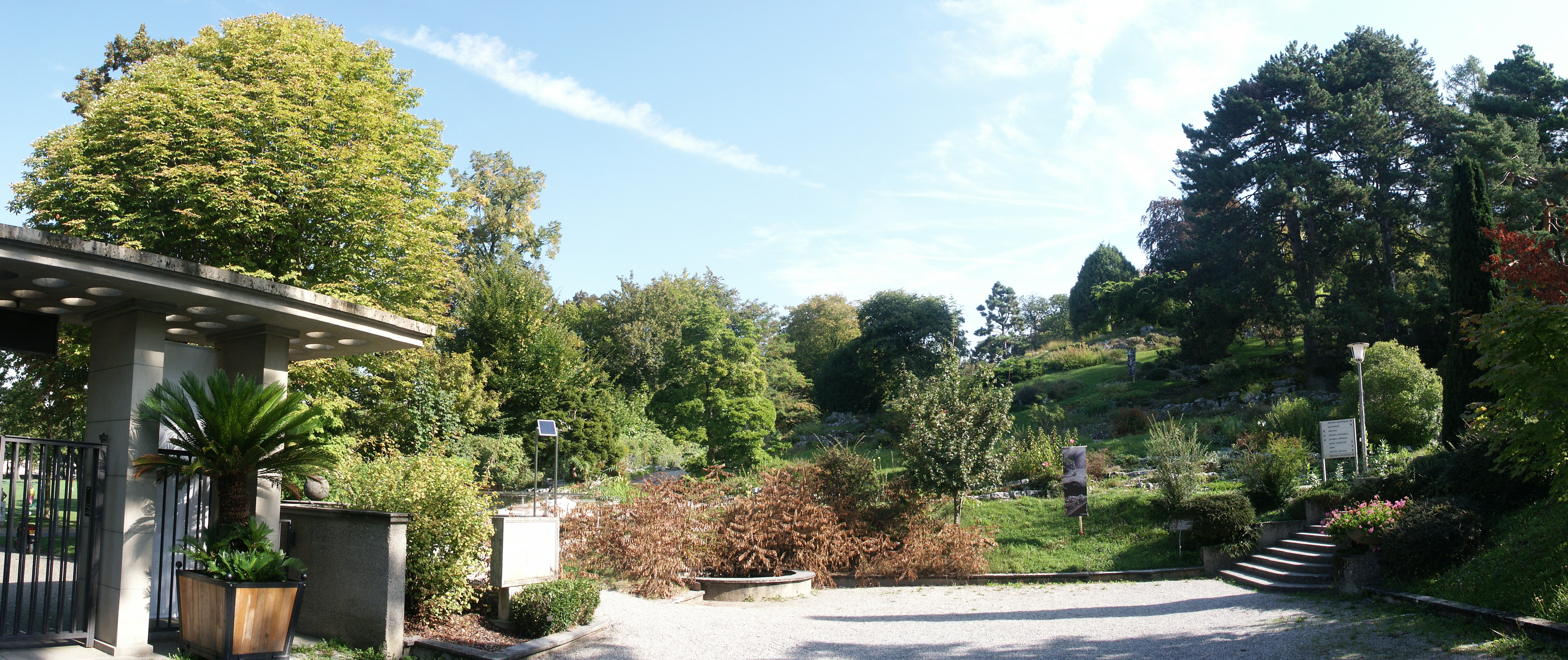
The entrance to the Cantonal Botanical Museum and Gardens

On January 1, 2023, the cantonal botanical gardens and museum merged to become a department of the Naturéum, Switzerland's natural science museum located in Lausanne, Vaud. The botanical department includes the museum and botanical garden in Lausanne, as well as the botanical garden, La Thomasia, in the Alps near the town of Bex. Administered under the Service of cultural affairs of Vaud, the botanic department engage in the study and protection of local flora, as well as in promoting public awareness in biodiversity and nature education in general.

The museum, as well as the two botanical gardens are listed as cultural assets of national importance.

== The botanical garden in Lausanne ==
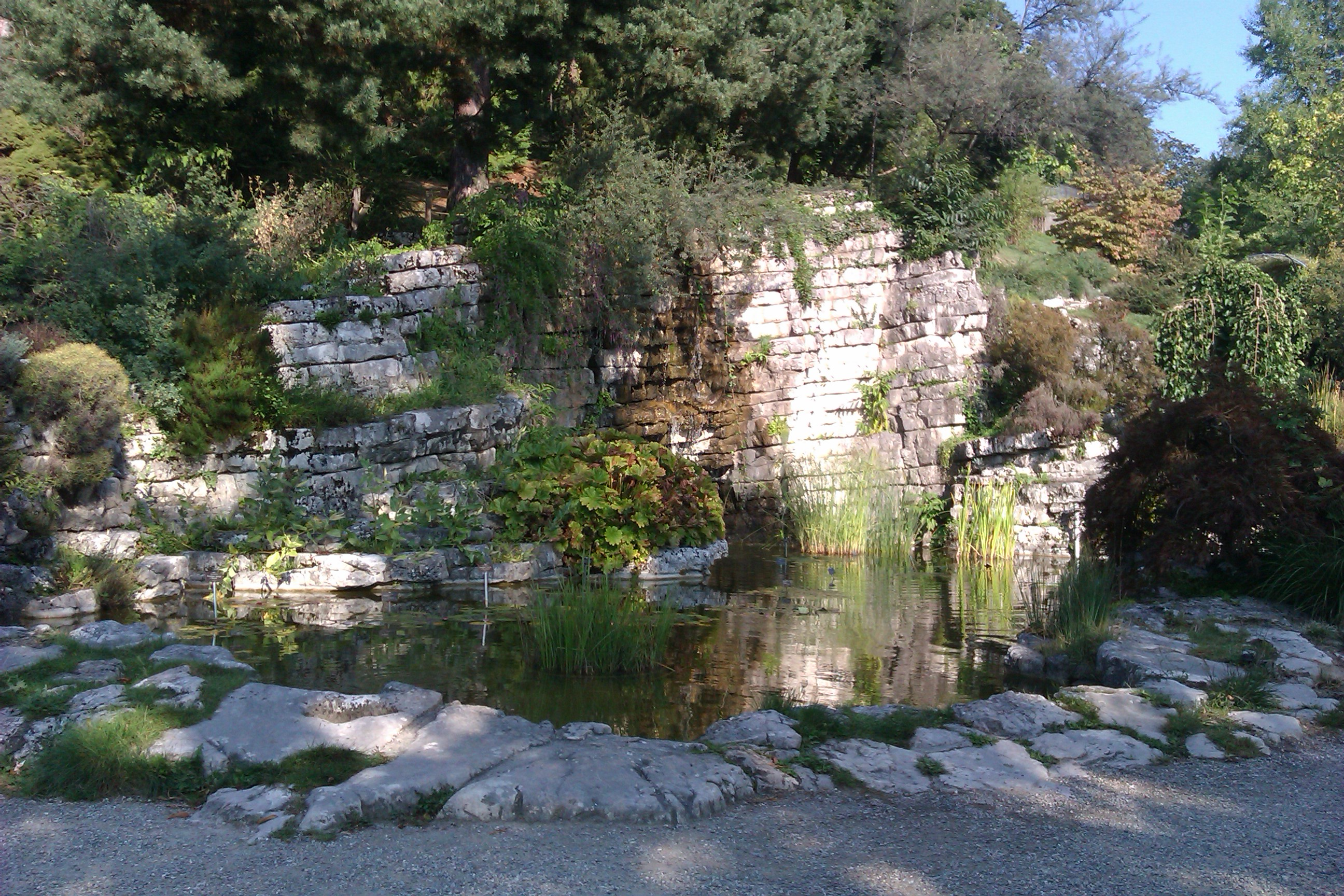
Cliff made of strata of rock and a cascade designed by Alphonse Laverrière

Although the first recorded private botanical garden in Lausanne dates from the end of the seventeenth century, the first cantonal botanical garden had its origin in the donation by Baron Albert de Büren of his collection of 1700 plants to the state in 1873. This was to serve as the basis for the creation of a botanical garden by the canton. At first, there was a temporary placement at Champ-de-l 'Air near what is now the University Hospital of Lausanne. In 1890, the collection was moved to the site of the newly constituted University of Lausanne, below the Faculty of Chemistry and Physics, rue de Couvaloup, where it was essentially used for the teaching of pharmacy and visited mainly by students.

In 1946, the garden was moved to its actual location, Avenue de Cour 14, on the south slope of Montriond-le-Crêt, a hill in the Parc de Milan, between the Lausanne train station and Lake Léman.

The design and creation of this new garden was the fruit of the close collaboration between the architect, Alphonse Laverrière, the professor Florian Cosandey, and the gardener, Charles Lardet. The plan for this new site included alpine rock gardens and a pool dominated by a cliff made of strata of rock and a cascade falling into the basin. The stone came from the Jura Mountains above Bière but the quarrying and assembly were made more difficult than custom by the strict requirements of the job. No marks of tools or broken fragments were allowed to be seen in the finished work, which must appear natural and as if part of the original hill site.

The garden today counts more than 6,000 plants, both local and from around the world, set in sectors dedicated to alpine, aquatic, medicinal and utilitarian plants, as well as greenhouses with tropical, succulent, and carnivorous specimens, and a small arboretum .

== The alpine garden, La Thomasia ==
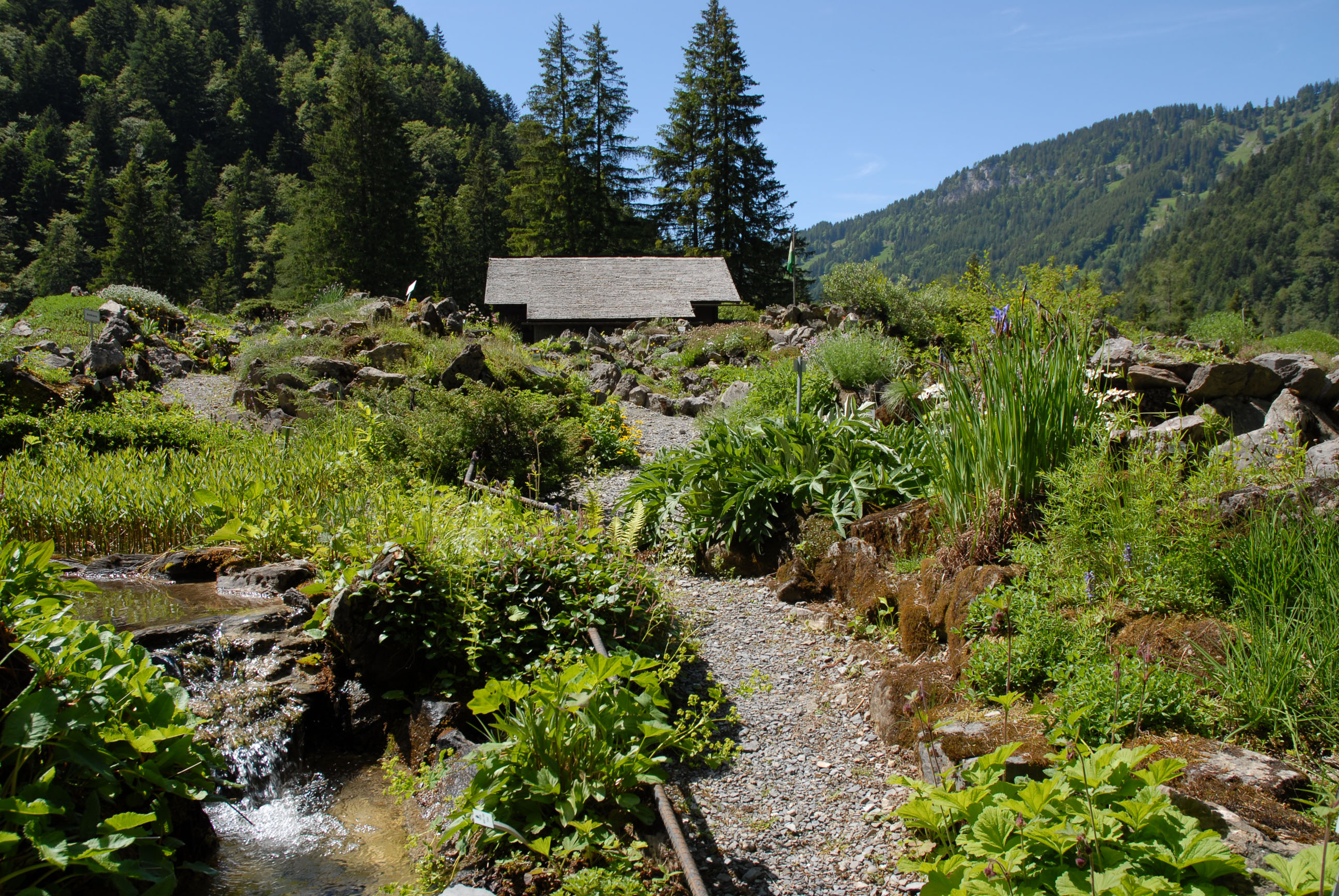
View of the alpine garden, La Thomasia, near Bex, Switzerland

La Thomasia, is located near the town of Bex, Canton Vaud, in the calcareous Swiss Alps. In spite of the relative low altitude, 1260 meters, its situation at the entrance of the Vallon de Nant, a small glacier valley, induces a subalpine climate to the garden. The valley is managed as a nature reserve since 1970.

La Thomasia was created in 1891, by the initiative of the city of Bex, and is the oldest continuously active alpine garden of Switzerland. By 1895, under Ernest Wilczek, director of the botanical garden in Lausanne, the collection counted already some 2000 species.

The garden takes its name from the family Thomas that gave four generations of botanists. The first was Pierre Thomas, who began his work under the direction of Albrecht von Haller, the author of the first flora of Switzerland. The family later made a business of collecting alpine plants in the mountains surrounding Bex and selling them to foreign collectors and gardens.

The garden is dedicated to alpine flora from all parts of the world. Over 3000 plant species are presented in the 70 rock gardens, covering over one hectare, and grouped according to geographical origin representing all the alpine and related regions of the world. The European Alps sector includes a large focus on local flora.

The surface of the garden is basically flat but covered with small artificial hills, which allow cultivation on different exposures and in a variety of habitats. Several ponds as well as a stream have been created and on the Eastern part, there is a spontaneous forest of European Spruce with large rocks, ferns and mosses.

An ecological area dedicated to spontaneous fauna was recently created. It consists of a small oligotrophic lake for amphibians, as well as reconstituted habitats for insects and small mammals with dead trees and alpine fellfields.

In the nursery, plants are cultivated for the botanical garden or for experimental research. The alpine garden is open daily from May through October, depending on snowfall and road conditions.

== The botanical museum ==
The museum is the repository of botanical collections for the Canton of Vaud. Beginning as a dependence of the Natural History Museum in 1824, the herbarium collection was given a distinct curator, Louis-Edouard Chavannes, 20 years later. He was succeeded by Rodolphe Blanchet, Jean-Balthazar Schnetzler, Louis Favrat, Ernest Wilczek, Arthur Maillefer, Florian Cosandey, Peter Villaret and Gino Müller. The current director of the museum and the gardens is François Felber.

In 1860, the botanical museum became an independent entity. At first, the herbarium collection occupied one room at the cure Dutoit. In 1874, it was transferred to the "Moravian House", rue Saint-Etienne below the cathedral, and in 1905, to the newly constructed Palais de Rumine along with all of the natural history collections of the canton. The herbarium collection was finally given its own home in 1964 with the construction of the current museum in the botanical garden of Lausanne.

Today the museum counts a herbarium collection of approximately one million herbarium sheets covering nearly 2,000 meters of shelving. The main collection is divided into three sections: 300,000 samples exclusively from the Canton of Vaud; 250,000 samples from other Swiss cantons; and a general herbarium collection of over 350,000 samples from the entire world. In addition to these the museum houses other historical herbarium collections including those of Jean-François Gaudin (1766–1833) and Johann-Christoph Schleicher (1770–1834), as well as specialized collections of lichens, mosses, algae and fungi, myxomycetes (Myxogastria), and samples of seeds and pollen.

Another noteworthy collection of the botanical museum is that of botanical illustration, and in particular, painted herbariums (Herbiers peints), dating from the late 18th century to the present day. Works by botanical illustrators include those by Rosalie de Constant (1758–1834), Marie Mousson (1805–1895), Mary Grierson (born 1912).

The museum also houses a collection of portraits of botanists and an archive which conserves essentially the correspondence and documents concerning notable botanists from the Canton of Vaud and the rest of Switzerland.

The museum’s library dates from the beginning of the museum in 1824. It currently contains approximately 35,000 books and over 800 periodicals of which 122 are still published. The collection covers all aspects of plant biology. Although it consists mainly of specialized works and focuses primarily on the acquisition of floras and monographs in systematic botany, books destined for the amateur can also found. The library conserves a collection of 3375 ancient books, floras and other works dating from 1531 to 1901, including works by Linné, Augustin Pyramus de Candolle, Albrecht von Haller, Johann Jakob Scheuchzer, Dominique Villars, Lamarck, Joseph Pitton de Tournefort, and others. The library is open to the public by appointment only.

== Activities of the botanical department ==
The department in its role of furthering public awareness and education in nature in general engages in various activities. Since 1994 and the creation of a multipurpose room, the Cantonal Museum and Botanical Gardens regularly mount botany-related exhibitions that often extend into the grounds of the two gardens, Lausanne and the alpine garden. Recent shows include: Diaspora, about fruit and seed dispersal; The painted herbarium of Rosalie de Constant; Au Rendez-vous des Arbres, photos of remarkable trees; and Wild flowers in the city.

The Museum and Botanical Gardens cantonal also organize animations for young persons and the general public, as well as conferences and botanical excursions, with the assistance of local botany associations.

== See also ==
- List of botanical gardens
- List of museums in Switzerland
- Natureum

== Bibliography ==
- M.-C. Robert, G. Muller, J.-L. Moret (1996), Le Jardin Botanique à Lausanne, Hier Aujourd’hui. Lausanne: Musée et jardins botaniques cantonaux
- G. Muller, J.-L. Moret et al (2001), Le Vallon de Nant. Bex, Switzerland: Fondation La Thomasia et Office du Tourisme de Bex.
- J. Magnin-Gonze, G. Muller, J.-L. Moret (1998), Le Musée botanique cantonal. Lausanne: Musée et jardins botaniques cantonaux
