= Alphonse Laverrière =

Swiss architect

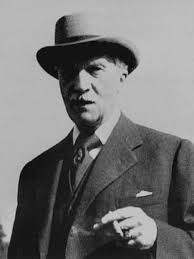
- Born: May 16, 1872
- Died: March 11, 1954 (aged 81)
- Resting place: Bois-de-Vaux Cemetery
- Education: École nationale supérieure des beaux-arts; École Supérieure des Beaux-Arts, Genève
- Occupation: Architect

Olympic medal record

Art competitions
Gold medal – first place	1912 Stockholm	Architecture

Alphonse Laverrière (16 May 1872 – 11 March 1954) was a Swiss architect.

He studied at the École Supérieure des Beaux-Arts, Genève and later at the École nationale supérieure des beaux-arts and was professor at the Swiss Federal Institute of Technology in Zurich.

In 1912, he won a gold medal in architecture with Eugène-Edouard Monod in the art competitions of the Olympic Games for their "Building Plan of a Modern Stadium".

Between 1922 and 1951, Laverrière designed the Bois-de-Vaux Cemetery at Lausanne and is buried there.

== Works ==
- Lausanne railway station
- Federal Supreme Court of Switzerland
- Cantonal Botanical Museum and Gardens
- Orbe penitentiary complex
