= Georges Dubois (sculptor) =

French sculptor

Personal information
- Nationality: French
- Born: 18 March 1865 Paris, France
- Died: 17 May 1934 (aged 69) Paris, France
- Occupation: Sculptor
Medal record
Representing FRA
Sculpture
Summer Olympic Games
Silver medal – second place	1912 Stockholm	Mixed sculpturing

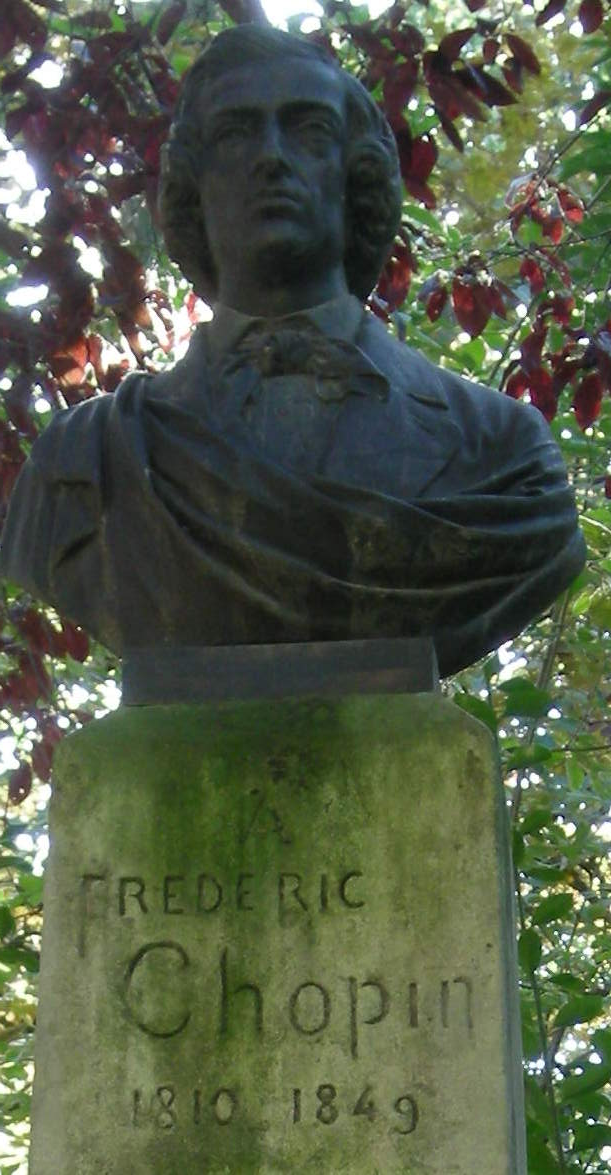
Replica of the bust Frédéric Chopin created by Dubois, in the Jardin du Luxembourg in Paris.

Georges Dubois (18 March 1865 – 17 May 1934) was a French sculptor who produced a bust of Frédéric Chopin for a memorial in the Jardin du Luxembourg in Paris. He won a silver medal in the mixed sculpturing event at the 1912 Summer Olympics.

== Career ==
In 1900, Dubois produced a bust of Frédéric Chopin for a memorial in the Jardin du Luxembourg in Paris. The bust had been requested the year before, to commemorate the 50th anniversary of Chopin's death, by Jules Massenet. The bust was removed from the Jardin du Luxembourg in 1942, and in 1999, it was replaced by a replica made by Bolesław Syrewicz.

In 1906, Dubois met with the Olympic Committee to discuss adding art competitions to the Summer Olympic Games. Dubois was a speaker at the event, and also produced a fencing display. He entered a plaster model of the doors of a gymnasium, entitled Model of the entrance to a modern stadium, into the mixed sculpturing event at the 1912 Summer Olympics in Stockholm, Sweden. He was awarded a silver medal.

== Works ==
- Dubois, Georges, Le point d'honneur et le duel, dispositions spéciales d'après-guerre (The point of honour and the duel, special post-war arrangements), 1909
- Dubois, Georges, L'escrime au théâtre (Fencing in the theatre), 1910
