= Maurice Pottecher =

French writer

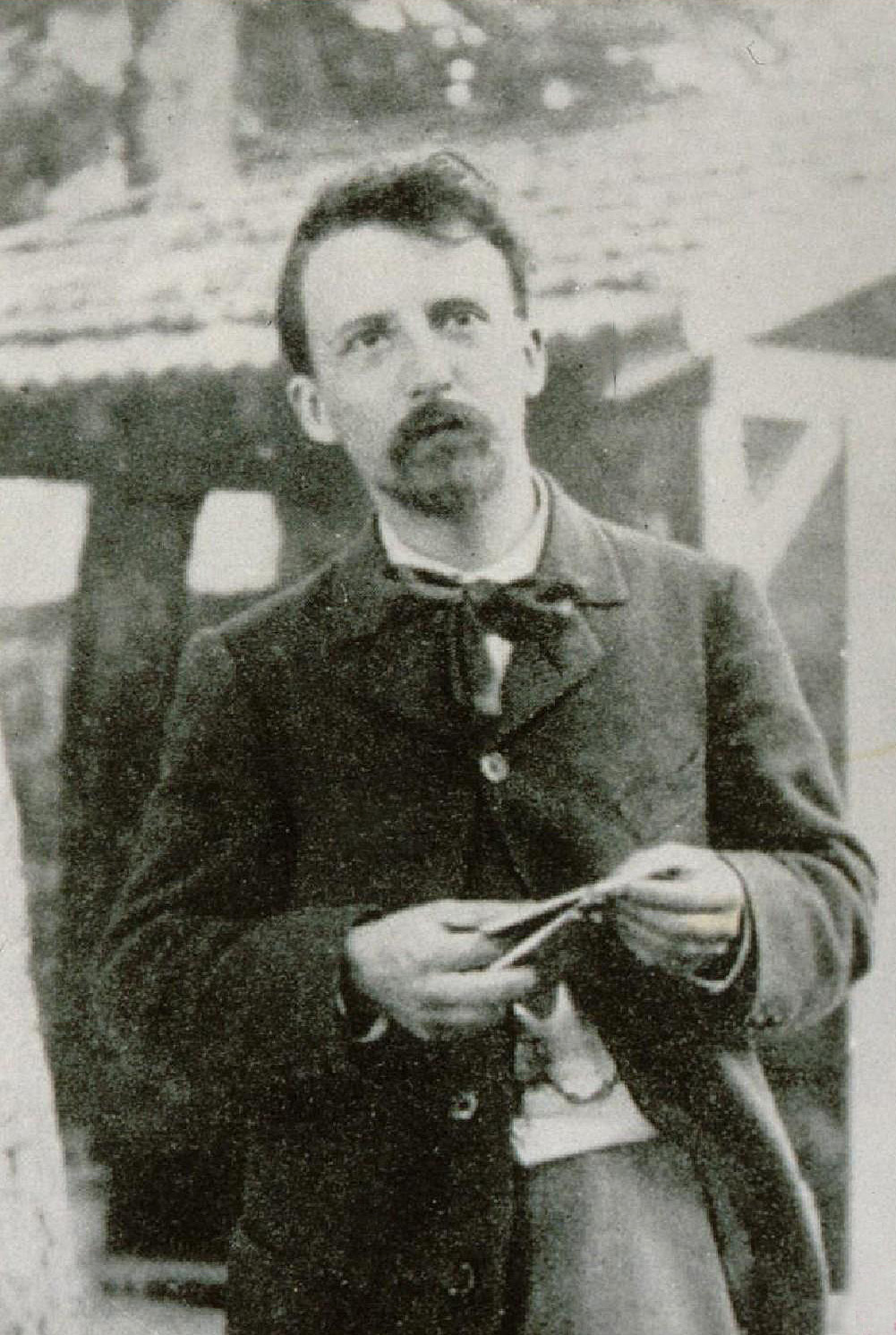
- Maurice Pottecher in 1895
- Born: 19 October 1867; Bussang, France
- Died: 16 April 1960 (aged 92); Fontenay-sous-Bois, France
- Occupation: Writer

Maurice Pottecher (19 October 1867 – 16 April 1960) was a French writer, and the creator and for many years the director of the Théâtre du Peuple in Bussang, his place of birth. His work was part of the literature event in the art competition at the 1912 Summer Olympics.

== Bibliography ==
- Georgette Jeanclaude, Un poète précurseur: Maurice Pottecher et le Théâtre du peuple, SPC, Chateaudin, 1960, 270 pp.
- Marie-José Pottecher-Onderet, Catherine Foki and Christine Devallois, L'aventure du théâtre populaire: une idée, le théâtre populaire: trois lieux, Bussang 1895, Théâtre national populaire 1920, Avignon 1947: trois hommes, Pottecher (1867-1960), Gemier (1869-1933), Vilar (1912-1971), Conseil général des Vosges, Épinal, 1992, 53 pp. (teaching dossier)

== Filmography ==
- Maurice Pottecher: l'aventure du Théâtre populaire, produced by Isabelle Clarke and Maïté Demoulin, Centre national de la cinématographie, Paris, 2003, 48 min (VHS)
