= Jacob Rees (architect) =

British architect (1844–1933)

- Born: 15 October 1844; Merthyr Tydfil, Wales
- Died: 16 October 1933 (aged 89); Barry, Wales
- Occupation: Architect

Jacob Rees (15 October 1844 – 16 October 1933) was a British architect. His work was part of the architecture event in the art competition at the 1912 Summer Olympics.
