= Georges-Pierre Dubois =

Swiss architect (1911–1983)

Georges-Pierre Dubois (6 February 1911, Locle – 7 January 1983, Zurich) was a Swiss architect known for his industrial buildings and Brutalist architecture. He ran a joint office with Jakob Eschenmoser from 1941 to 1953.

== Biography ==
After studying at the ETH Zurich under William Dunkel and Otto R. Salvisberg, from which he graduated in 1936, he undertook an extended study trip to Greece and Turkey from 1936 to 1937. He then worked in Le Corbusier's office until 1940. After returning to Switzerland, he worked for Salvisberg. After Salvisberg's sudden death at the end of 1940, Dubois joined forces with Jakob Eschenmoser, whom he had met there, and set up his own business. Dubois carried out a commission for a villa near Lausanne together with a long-established office in western Switzerland. Dubois and Eschenmoser received their first major commissions from Dubois's brother Albert, who was then general manager at Saurer, a machinery company, which became one of the largest employers in Eastern Switzerland in the 1950s. Among other projects, Dubois was planning their office building, an auto repair workshop, and a cafeteria.

In the late 1950s, the Dubois and Eschenmoser constructed a Unité d'Habitation for Saurer AG in the style of Le Corbusier, and a decade later, they built two more units in Zurich-Affoltern.

Dubois also built a fruit processing factory in Thurgau. In the 1960s, they added more industrial buildings, including the Portescap watch factory, a Brutalist-style exposed concrete building, and facilities for the Cardinal Brewery in Freiburg.

== Selected works ==
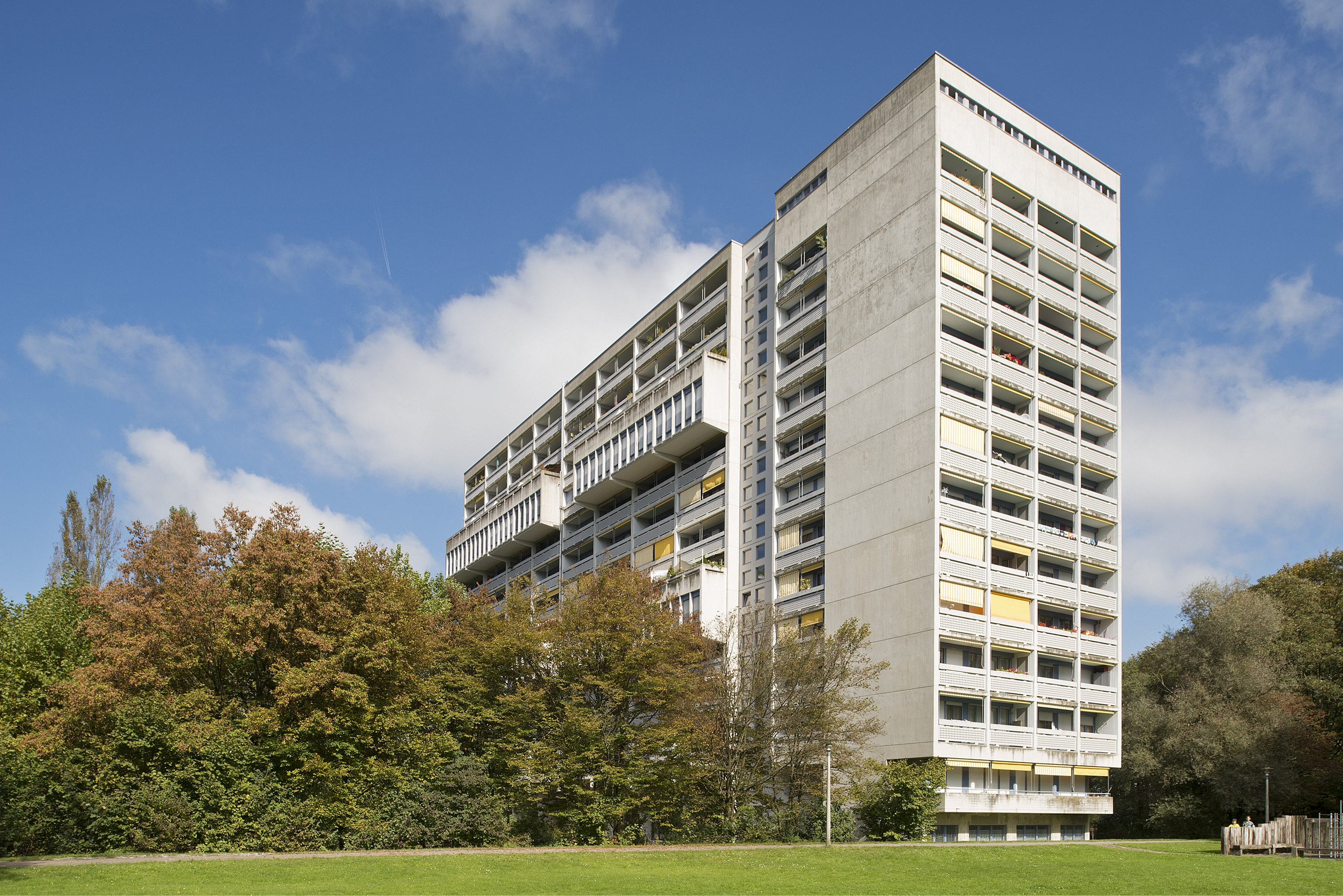
Unteraffoltern II

- Villa, Prilly 1941 (with Perrelet and Stalé, Lausanne)
- Villa Täuber-Boveri, Baden, 1958
- Cardinal Brewery, Freiburg 1962–65
- Villa Dominik von Streng, Hitzligen, Mauensee, 1963–64
- Portescap factory building, La Chaux-de-Fonds 1963
- Castle renovation, Mauensee 1960
- Villa Wenger, Saint-Rémy-la-Rame 1970
- Unteraffoltern II housing estate, Affoltern (Zürich) 1970
- Bürogebäude, Saurer AG, Arbon 1942–43
- Obstverwertungsanlage, Unipektin, Eschenz 1944–45
- Kantine, Saurer AG, Arbon 1945
- Heizungszentrale, Saurer AG, Arbon 1945
- Reparaturwerkstätte, Saurer AG, Arbon 1946–47
- Villa Keller, Küsnacht 1952
- Wohngebäude, Saurer AG, Arbon 1959–60

== Literature ==
- Sylvain Malfroy: Dubois, Georges-Pierre In: Isabelle Rucki und Dorothee Huber (Hrsg.): . Birkhäuser, Basel 1998, ISBN 3-7643-5261-2, S. 150.
