= May Garrettson Evans =

American news reporter

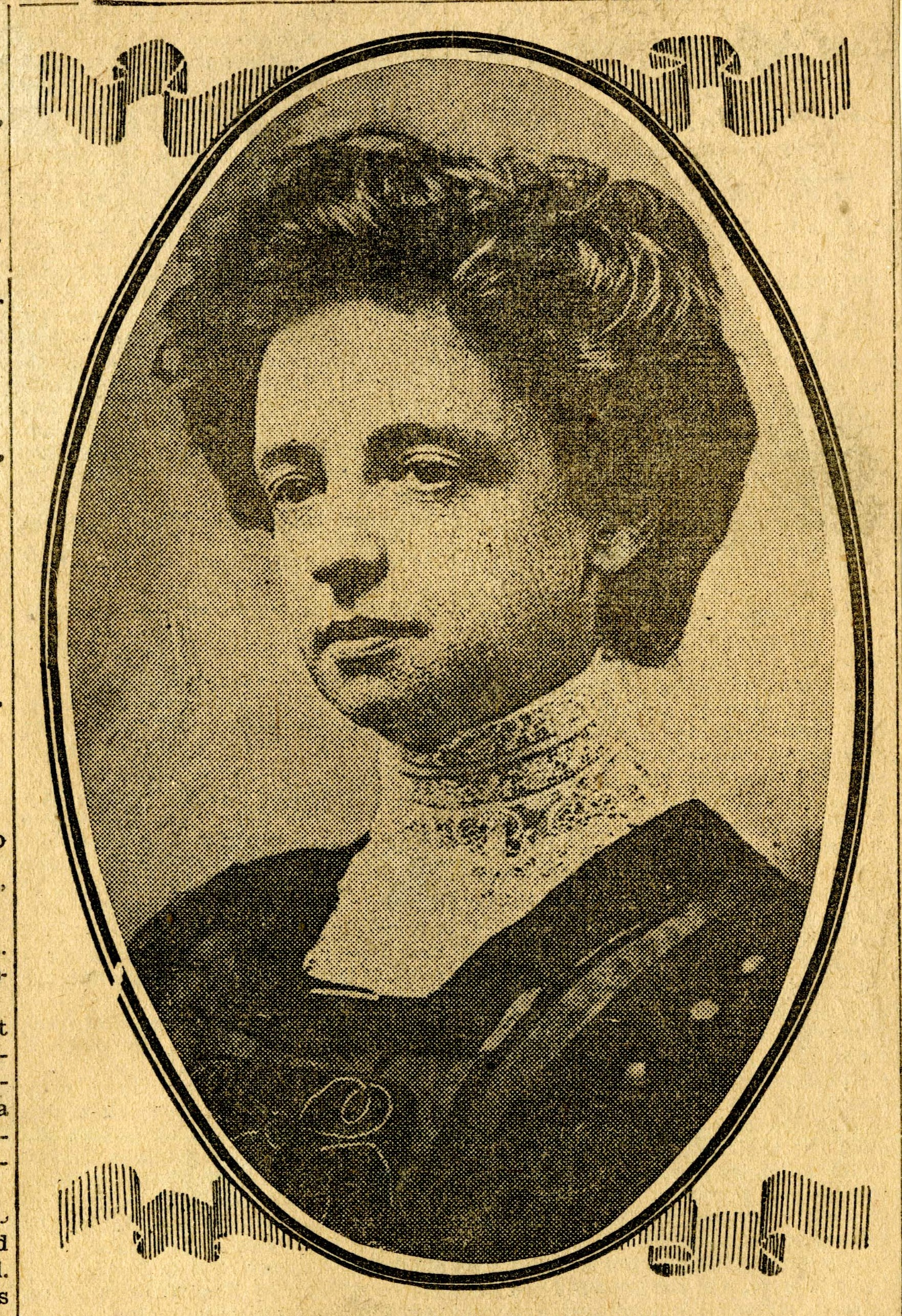
- Born: 1866
- Died: 1947

May Garrettson Evans (October 28, 1866-January 12, 1947) was the first female reporter for the Baltimore Sun. She founded and directed the preparatory school of the Peabody Conservatory for over 30 years. An Edgar Allan Poe scholar, she made several important discoveries regarding Poe in Baltimore.

== Early life ==
May Garrettson Evans was one of eight children of Henry Cotheal Evans and Mary Elizabeth Garrettson. She was educated at the Georgetown Convent of the Visitation and studied violin at the Peabody Conservatory from 1886 to 1889.

== Baltimore Sun ==
Evans started her journalism career assisting her brother, Baltimore Sun reporter Henry Ridgely Evans. Evans joined the Baltimore Sun in 1888 as a reporter and music and drama critic. Assigned to the night shift, Evans was initially chaperoned by her mother, but soon went to work alone with a stiletto for protection.

Evans worked for the Sun from 1888 to 1895. She said decades later "My adventure into the newspaper field created a commotion. At first I was more interviewed than interviewing. I had to explain myself everywhere."

Evans was the first female reporter for the Sun, but it is sometimes said that Evans was the first female reporter in Baltimore. Louise Malloy began working for the Baltimore American in 1886.

== Peabody Preparatory ==
While working on a Sun story, Evans spoke to Peabody Conservatory director Asger Hamerik about a preparatory school for the Peabody. While Hamerik liked the idea, the Peabody Institute did not act on it, so Evans and her sister Marion did it themselves, founding the Peabody Graduates' Preparatory and High School of Music themselves in 1894. They rented a house on Centre Street and had 300 applicants the first year, far exceeding their expectations. Evans left the Sun the next year to focus on the school.

The preparatory school was incorporated into the Peabody Institute in 1898 under Hamerik's successor Harold Randolph. It became the Peabody Preparatory Department with Evans as superintendent and her sister as associate superintendent. Over the years, the school expanded to offer classes in dance and music appreciation and started a community singing program. The preparatory school moved into Leakin Hall in 1926.

In 1928, Evans and her sisters Marion and Bessie visited New Mexico to study Navajo and Pueblo dance. They offered programming in Native American Dance at the preparatory school and May and Bessie Evans published American Indian Dance Steps in 1931.

When May and Marion Evans retired from the Peabody in 1929, the school had grown to over 75 faculty and 2000 students.

== Edgar Allan Poe ==
Evans was a scholar of Baltimore poet Edgar Allan Poe and shared her research with members of Woman's Literary Club of Baltimore and later the Edgar Allan Poe Society. She was a founding member of the Poe Society in 1924 and served as president from 1935 to 1938. In 1939 she published the book Music and Edgar Allan Poe: a Bibliographical Study. Evans made two important discoveries regarding Poe in Baltimore. She discovered that the marker indicating the site of Poe's original burial was in the wrong location and published an extensive article on the subject in the Sun in 1920. The marker was moved to the correct place the next year. When urban renewal threatened to raze the area containing Poe's Amity Street home in 1938, Evans' research was able to pinpoint the exact house Poe had lived in and it was preserved by the Poe Society as the Edgar Allan Poe House and Museum.

== Death and legacy ==
May Garrettson Evans died on January 13, 1947.
