= Pollyanna (1960 film) =

1960 film by David Swift

- Theatrical release poster
- Directed by: David Swift
- Screenplay by: David Swift
- Based on: Pollyanna by Eleanor Porter
- Produced by: Walt Disney
- Starring: Jane Wyman; Richard Egan; Karl Malden; Nancy Olson; Adolphe Menjou; Donald Crisp; Agnes Moorehead; Kevin Corcoran; Hayley Mills
- Cinematography: Russell Harlan
- Edited by: Frank Gross
- Music by: Paul Smith
- Production company: Walt Disney Productions
- Distributed by: Buena Vista Distribution
- Release date: May 19, 1960
- Running time: 134 minutes
- Country: United States
- Language: English
- Budget: $2.5 million
- Box office: $3.75 million (US and Canadian rentals)

Pollyanna is a 1960 American comedy-drama film starring Hayley Mills, Jane Wyman, Karl Malden, and Richard Egan in a story about a cheerful orphan changing the outlook of a small town. The film was written and directed by David Swift, based on the 1913 novel Pollyanna by Eleanor H. Porter. The film won Hayley Mills an Academy Juvenile Award. It was the last film of actor Adolphe Menjou.

Pollyanna was Hayley Mills' first of six films for Disney and the directorial debut of David Swift.

== Plot ==
Pollyanna, the 11-year-old orphaned daughter of missionaries, arrives in the small town of Harrington to live with her rich and strict aunt Polly Harrington in the 1910s. Pollyanna is a very cheerful, talkative, and radically optimistic youngster who focuses on the goodness of life and always finds something to be glad about, regardless of what the situation is. In doing so, Pollyanna's positive outlook on everything results in her making a wide variety of friends in the community, including the hypochondriac and grouchy Mrs. Snow and the acidic recluse Mr. Pendergast.

Aunt Polly's wealth controls most of the town. When the citizens want a derelict orphanage razed and rebuilt, Aunt Polly opposes the idea, arguing that her father donated the building to the town, and it is an important landmark as such. The townspeople defy her by planning a carnival to raise funds for a new structure. Many people feel reluctant to show their support because Aunt Polly asserts control over every facet of the town.

A group of citizens led by Aunt Polly's ex-boyfriend Dr. Edmond Chilton tries to persuade the town's minister, Rev. Ford, to publicly declare his support for the bazaar by reminding him that "nobody owns a church". Pollyanna delivers a note from Aunt Polly with recommendations for his sermon content, reminding Rev. Ford of the truth of that statement. This lesson is reinforced when Pollyanna shows Ford a locket from her late father, inscribed with a quote from Abraham Lincoln reading, "When you look for the bad in mankind expecting to find it, you surely will."

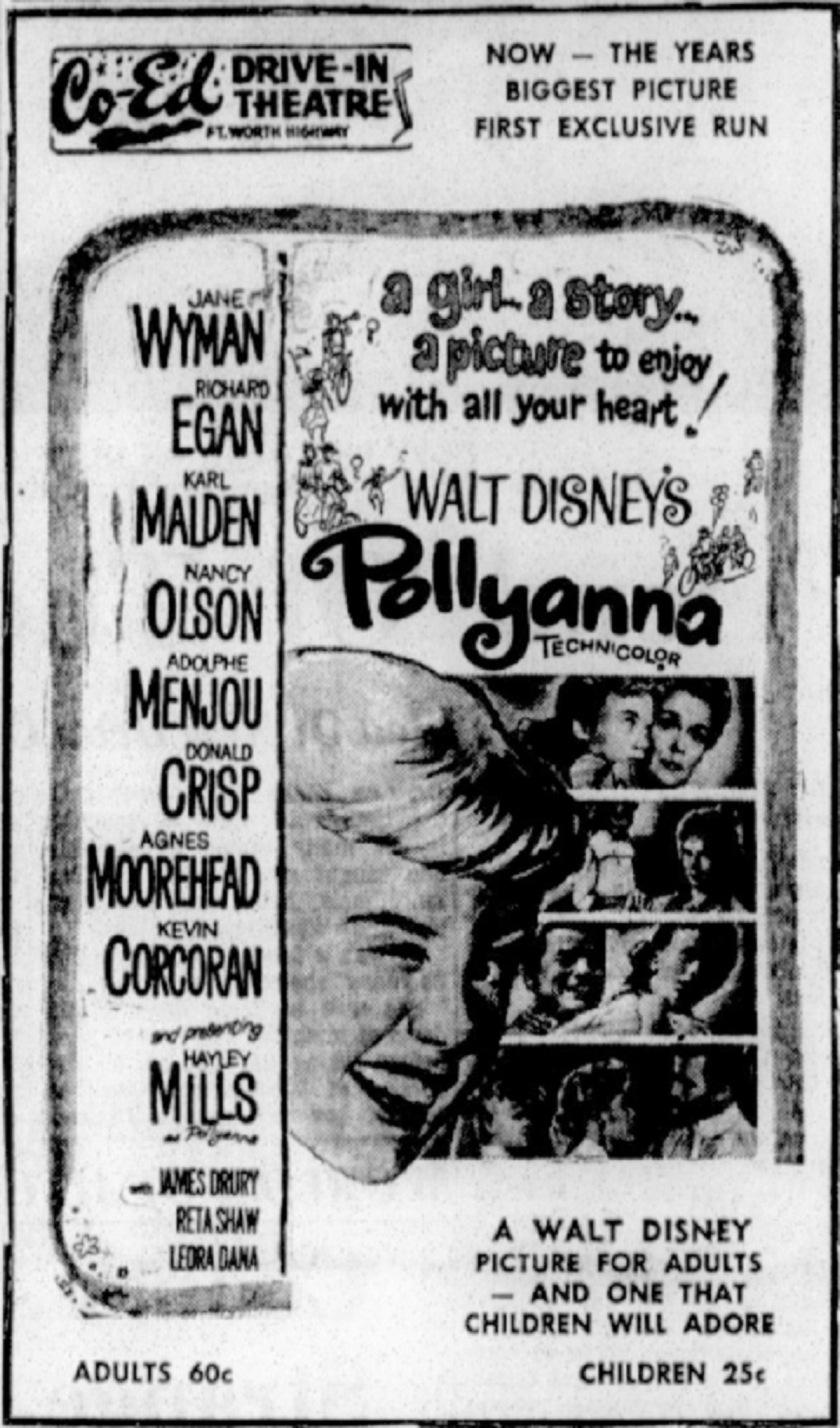
Drive-in advertisement from 1960

First, Rev. Ford reads one of the so-called "Glad Passages" of the Bible at church the following Sunday, stating that a young member of the congregation pointed out how many such passages there are, having gained the gumption to defy Aunt Polly. He intends to read one a week from this time on and then declares his support for the bazaar and encourages all to attend. Aunt Polly becomes furious about their audacity, forbidding Pollyanna to participate. On the evening of the carnival, Pollyanna is locked in her attic bedroom by Aunt Polly but is "rescued" by playmate and fellow orphan Jimmy Bean, who reminds her that she will lead "America the Beautiful" at the high point of the event. She slips away with Jimmy's help and has a wonderful time at the carnival, winning her first-ever doll.

Upon returning home, Pollyanna avoids Aunt Polly by climbing a tree to her attic bedroom. When trying to reach her bedroom window, she drops her new doll; Pollyanna then falls off the window ledge screaming and is knocked unconscious before being discovered by Aunt Polly and her maids.

After realizing her legs are paralyzed and that she may not ever walk again, Pollyanna develops severe depression, jeopardizing her chance of recovery. Meanwhile, Aunt Polly feels extreme guilt when she realizes how her behavior has isolated her from the town and Pollyanna. While talking to Dr. Chilton, she admits that her niece needed love, and it was something she never gave her. Dr. Chilton tells Aunt Polly that they can give Pollyanna the love together and help mend the isolation she put on the townsfolk.

When the townspeople learn of Pollyanna's accident, they arrive at Aunt Polly's house with outpourings of love. Dr. Chilton carries the reluctant girl downstairs where the neighbors wish her health one by one. Pollyanna's spirit gradually returns to its usual hopefulness and love of life, and she also learns that Jimmy has been adopted by Mr. Pendergast. Pollyanna is embraced by her aunt before they leave Harrington with Dr. Chilton for an operation in Baltimore, which would correct her injury and help her walk again. She also found that the town adopted a nickname, Gladtown.

== Cast ==
- Hayley Mills as Pollyanna Whittier
- Jane Wyman as Polly Harrington, Pollyanna's maternal aunt
- Richard Egan as Dr. Edmond Chilton, Polly Harrington's ex-boyfriend
- Karl Malden as Reverend Ford, the church minister
- Nancy Olson as Nancy Furman, the downstairs maid and Pollyanna's new best friend
- Adolphe Menjou as Mr. Pendergast, a recluse who eventually opens his heart and adopts Jimmy
- Donald Crisp as Mayor Karl Warren, Dr. Chilton's uncle
- Agnes Moorehead as Mrs. Snow, a hypochondriac
- Kevin Corcoran as Jimmy Bean, an orphan who is eventually adopted by Mr. Pendergast
- James Drury as George Dodds, Nancy's boyfriend
- Reta Shaw as Tillie Lagerlof, the cook
- Anne Seymour as Amelia Tarbell
- Edward Platt as Ben Tarbell, Amelia Tarbell's husband
- Mary Grace Canfield as Angelica, the upstairs maid
- Jenny Egan as Mildred Snow, Mrs. Snow's daughter
- Gage Clarke as Mr. Cory Murg, the town mortician
- Ian Wolfe as Mr. Neely
- Nolan Leary as Mr. Thomas
- Edgar Dearing as Mr. Gorman

Director David Swift cameos as a fireman in an early scene.

== Production ==
=== Development ===
The novel had been filmed before, notably with Mary Pickford, in 1920. The book continued to sell 35,000 copies per year by the late 1950s. Disney announced in June 1959 that he would make the film with Hayley Mills, Jane Wyman, and Karl Malden, and David Swift as screenwriter and director.

Swift was best known at the time for his work in television. He said: "It was the first time anyone would take a $2.5 million chance on me. Trust Disney to do it."

=== Casting ===
Disney put Mills into the cast after seeing her in the British film Tiger Bay. He watched the film to see the most recent performance by her father, John Mills, who was to star in the studio's Swiss Family Robinson. Disney then offered Miss Mills the lead in Pollyanna. Her accent was explained by turning Pollyanna's parents into missionaries from the British West Indies.

Disney said the cast was the most important in the studio's history, including names such as Wyman, Malden, and Richard Egan.

Swift commented on casting: "The cast scared me. Veterans of scores of movies, some of them. I was afraid they'd say 'TV man, go home'. But they didn't. It was a happy set; everybody worked his head off for me."

=== Script ===
Swift said in working on the script that, to work against the "saccharine" nature of the material, he would spend a few hours every day first working on a horror play called The Deadly. He would then work on Pollyanna.

Swift said, "In the book, Pollyanna was so filled with happiness and light that I wanted to kick her. In the old days, she came on like Betty Hutton. Now, she is shy. We have an adult drag advice out of her."

Swift also decided to remove a key plot point of the book, where Pollyanna was hit by a car and had to learn how to walk. He called this "Too coincidental. Too pat."

Swift added that "instead of making her the 'glad girl' of the book, we've simmered her cheerfulness down to merely emphasize the things-could-be-worse attitude."

=== Shooting ===
Pollyanna began filming in August 1959.

The film was shot in Santa Rosa, California, with the Mableton Mansion at 1015 McDonald Avenue in Santa Rosa serving as the exterior and grounds of Aunt Polly's house. Other California locations included Napa Valley and Petaluma. Interiors were filmed at the Walt Disney Studios in Burbank, California. The book sets the town of Harrington in Vermont, but the film places Harrington in Maryland; Baltimore is mentioned several times throughout the script. Aunt Polly and Pollyanna take the train to Baltimore at the end of the film, possibly headed to Johns Hopkins Hospital due to the delicacy of the operation needed (Johns Hopkins opened in 1889, and the story takes place in the 1910s).

== Reception ==
Rotten Tomatoes rated the film 86%.

=== Box office ===
Disney reported in 1960 that the film made a profit "but not nearly what we expected".

Jerry Griswold wrote in The New York Times on October 25, 1987:

An attempt was made to resuscitate Pollyanna in 1960 when Walt Disney released a movie based on the book. Time, Newsweek, and other major reviewers agreed that such an enterprise promised to be a disaster – a tearjerker of a story presented by the master of schmaltz; what surprised the critics (their opinions were unanimous) was that it was his best live-action film ever. But few had reckoned the curse of the book's by-then-saccharine reputation. When the movie failed to bring in half of the $6 million that was expected, Disney opined, "I think the picture would have done better with a different title. Girls and women went to it, but men tended to stay away because it sounded sweet and sticky".

The film has continued to be popular on television and home media. It is available to stream on Disney+.

== Awards and honors ==
Hayley Mills won the 1960 Academy Juvenile Award for her performance and also received a BAFTA nomination for Best Actress.

== Merchandise ==
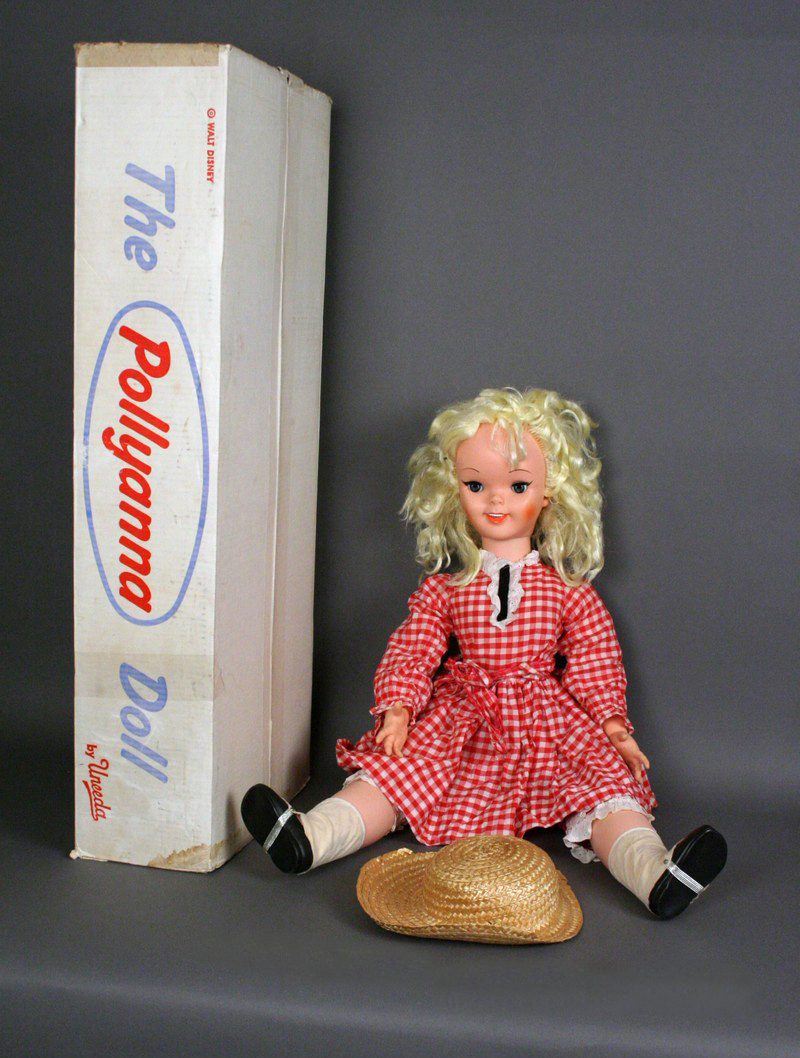
A doll used to promote the film

The film generated a trickle of juvenile merchandise, including a Dell comic book, a paper-doll collection, an LP recording, an illustrated Little Golden Book, and a 30" Uneeda character doll in a red and white gingham dress, pantaloons, and boots. Disney was selling photo lockets as part of a merchandise promotion, with the quote claiming to be from Abraham Lincoln on them: "If you look for the bad in mankind expecting to find it, you surely will". Director and screenwriter David Swift discovered the necklace in a gift shop while on vacation with his family and called the studio to have the item recalled immediately, as it was not a quote from Lincoln, but actually a paraphrasing of a line from Eleanor Porter's original 1913 novel written for the film.

== See also ==
- List of American films of 1960
