= Sallie Webster Dorsey =

American librarian

- Born: April 5, 1860; Baltimore, Maryland
- Died: August 5, 1937
- Occupation: Librarian
- Known for: Maryland State Librarian, 1912 to 1916
- Relatives: Hester Dorsey Richardson (sister)

Sallie Webster Dorsey (April 5, 1860 – August 5, 1937) was an American librarian and clubwoman. She was Maryland State Librarian from 1912 to 1916.

== Early life ==
Sallie Webster Dorsey was born in Baltimore, Maryland, the daughter of James Levin Dorsey and Sarah Ann Webster Richardson Dorsey. Her father was a grain broker. Her sister Hester Dorsey Richardson was a clubwoman and local historian in Maryland.

== Career ==
Dorsey wrote for newspapers, and was one of the original members of the Woman's Literary Club of Baltimore. She was president of the Cambridge Woman's Club, and hosted literary gatherings in her home in Cambridge. From 1912 to 1916 she was Maryland State Librarian, based in Annapolis, and a member of the Maryland Public Library Commission. She was appointed by Governor Phillips Lee Goldsborough, who was also her neighbor and a family friend. She attended the annual meeting of the National Association of State Libraries in Washington, D.C., in 1914.

Dorsey raised money to provide an organ and community service items for the Old Church, a Protestant Episcopal parish in Dorchester County, Maryland. She supported public playgrounds and gardens. She was also an active member of the Baltimore chapter of the Daughters of the American Revolution. During World War I, she chaired the Volunteer Motor Messenger Service of the Women's Section of the Council of Defense in Baltimore.

== Personal life and legacy ==
Dorsey lived with her older sisters Elizabeth and Mary in Dorchester County. She died in 1937, aged 77 years. A duster-style linen coat worn and mended by Dorsey is in the collection of the Maryland Center for History and Culture.
