= Visitation Academy =

Visitation Academy may refer to:

- Visitation Academy of St. Louis, a parochial all-girls Roman Catholic school in Town and Country, Missouri
- Visitation Academy of Frederick, a former Catholic school in Frederick County, Maryland
- Academy of the Visitation in Dubuque, Iowa attended by film actress Margaret Lindsay
- Convent and Academy of the Visitation in Mobile, Alabama
- Mount de Chantal Visitation Academy in Wheelning, West Virginia
- Georgetown Visitation Preparatory School in Washington, D.C.
- Villa Maria Academy of the Visitation founded by John W. Johnston in Abingdon in 1867
- Baltimore Academy of the Visitation attended by Louise Malloy

== See also ==
- Order of the Visitation of Holy Mary
- Visitation (Christianity)
