= Hester Dorsey Richardson =

American author (1862–1933)

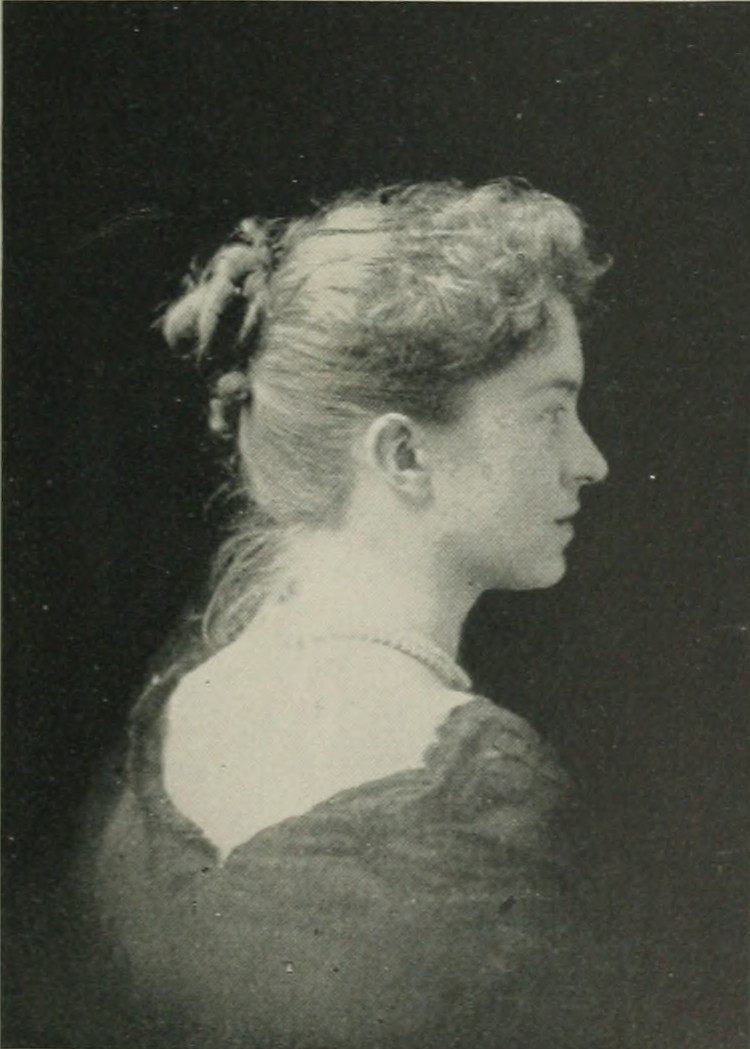
- Photo in A Woman of the Century
- Born: Hester Crawford Dorsey; January 9, 1862; Baltimore, Maryland, U.S.
- Died: December 10, 1933 (aged 71); Baltimore
- Resting place: Old Trinity Church Cemetery, Dorchester County, Maryland, U.S.
- Occupations: author; historian; genealogist; clubwoman
- Spouse: Albert Levin Richardson (m. 1891; died 1925)
- Children: 1 known child
- Parents: James L. Dorsey; Sarah A. W. Dorsey
- Writing career
- Pen name: Selene
- Language: English
- Genre: History
- Notable works: Side-lights on Maryland History; With Sketches of Early Maryland Families (1913)

Hester Dorsey Richardson (née Dorsey; pen name, Selene; January 9, 1862 – December 10, 1933) was an American author of several historical studies of Maryland, as well as a genealogist and clubwoman. Among her publications were The Origin and Customs of English Manors: With an Account of Feudal Rights and Privileges in the American Colonies (1912; 1913) and Side-lights on Maryland History; With Sketches of Early Maryland Families (1913). Her work was commended in England as well as in the U.S.

== Early life ==
Hester Crawford Dorsey was born in Baltimore, Maryland on January 9, 1862. She was the daughter of James L. Dorsey and Sarah A. W. Dorsey, both representatives of Maryland's old colonial families. Her siblings included librarian Sallie Webster Dorsey, Mary, and Charles.

== Career ==
Hester, the best known of three literary sisters, made her first appearance in the Sunday papers of her native city. She wrote in verse a year or more, before turning her attention to prose writings. Not a few of her poems attracted favorable comment and found their way into various exchanges. In 1886, she wrote "Dethroned," a poem narrating the fate of Maximilian I of Mexico, a copy of which, handsomely engrossed, was presented to Franz Joseph I of Austria, to whom it was dedicated. The emperor accepted the dedication in a letter of thanks to the author. Then Hester, at the request of the Baltimore American, began a series of articles on ethical and sociological subjects, to which she signed the pen name "Selene". Those "Selene Letters" at once attracted wide attention and excited controversy in literary circles. Her prose writings did much toward improving the hospital service in Baltimore, and a pungent letter from her pen helped to rescue the Mercantile Library from an untimely end.

She was a benefactor to the women of Baltimore. In co-founding the Woman's Literary Club of Baltimore, 1891, she laid the firm foundation of a controlling force in the intellectual and social life of her native city. The club had more than 100 members, including many of the best known writers of the day. Richardson resigned the first vice-presidency of the club upon her removal to New York, where she lived since her marriage, holding an honorary membership. She continued to devote herself wholly to literary work. She appeared several times in Lippincott's Magazine, writing short stories, and also contributed to The Philadelphia Press, The Baltimore American, and the Baltimore Sunday Sun. She was the author of The Origin and Customs of English Manors: With an Account of Feudal Rights and Privileges in the American Colonies (1912, as Mrs. Albert Levin Richardson; 1913 edition, as Hester Dorsey Richardson) and Side-lights on Maryland History: With Sketches of Early Maryland Families (1913).

Richardson served as Special Executive Historian to represent Maryland in historic work at the Jamestown Exposition, 1907; and was the historical director, Maryland commission, Panama–Pacific International Exposition, San Francisco, 1915. She was the founder and president of The Order of Colonial Lords of Manors in America; president, Public Records Commission of Maryland, 1904–8; vice-president, Maryland Original Research Society; historian, Baltimore Chapter, Daughters of the American Revolution; and was a fellow of The Manorial Society of England. She was a member of the American Historical Association, the Maryland Historical Society, as well as a life member, Societe Academique d'Histoire Internationale, Paris.

== Personal life ==
In January 1891, she married the journalist, Albert Levin Richardson. They had at least one child, a son, Dorsey.

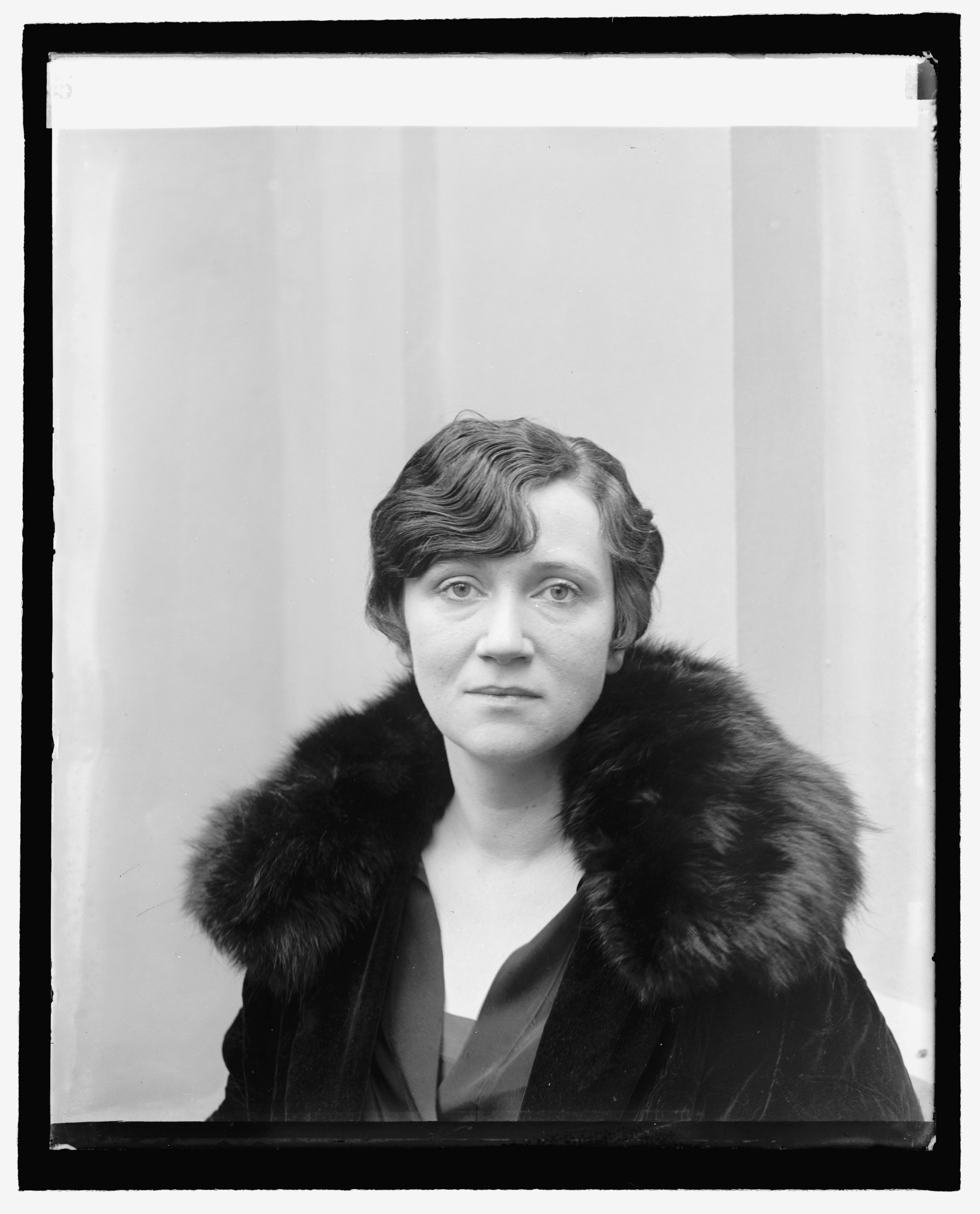

Hester Dorsey Richardson died at her home in Baltimore, December 10, 1933. Burial was at the Old Trinity Church Cemetery, Dorchester County, Maryland.

== Selected works ==
- The Origin and Customs of English Manors: With an Account of Feudal Rights and Privileges in the American Colonies (1912; 1913)
- Side-lights on Maryland History; With Sketches of Early Maryland Families (1913)
