= The Story of Pollyanna, Girl of Love =

Japanese anime television series

- Cover of the first volume of the DVD release by Bandai, featuring Pollyanna
- 愛少女ポリアンナ物語
- Genre: Historical drama
- Based on: Pollyanna and Pollyanna Grows Up by Eleanor H. Porter
- Written by: Chisako Kuki; Akae Kunihiro
- Directed by: Kōzō Kusuba
- Music by: Reijirō Koroku
- Country of origin: Japan
- Original language: Japanese
- No. of episodes: 51

Production
- Executive producer: Koichi Motohashi
- Producers: Junzō Nakajima (Nippon Animation); Taihei Ishikawa (Fuji TV)
- Production companies: Nippon Animation; Fuji Television

Original release
- Network: FNS (Fuji TV)
- Release: 5 January – 28 December 1986

The Story of Pollyanna, Girl of Love (愛少女ポリアンナ物語, Ai Shōjo Porianna Monogatari) is a Japanese anime series by Nippon Animation, and part of the World Masterpiece Theater series. It consists of 51 episodes. Premiering across Fuji TV from 5 January to 28 December 1986, it has rerun across Japan on Animax from February 2007. It was dubbed in other languages for some regions of the world outside Japan including Portugal, France, Italy, Spain, Germany, Ukraine, Thailand, the Arab World, and the Philippines.

It was based on the 1913 novel Pollyanna and its 1915 sequel Pollyanna Grows Up by Eleanor H. Porter.

== Synopsis ==
Set in the United States between 1920 and 1921, primarily in the fictional town of Beldingsville and the city of Boston, the series follows Pollyanna Whittier, an optimistic orphan whose unwavering belief in "finding the good" transforms the lives of those around her.

After the death of her father, the Reverend John Whittier, Pollyanna is sent to live with her strict and emotionally distant aunt, Polly Harrington, in Beldingsville. Despite her aunt's cold demeanor, Pollyanna gradually wins the affection of the townspeople through her cheerful outlook and the "finding the good" game, a philosophy taught to her by her father that encourages finding something positive in every situation. Among those whose lives she influences are the reclusive millionaire John Pendleton, the homeless boy Jimmy Bean, and the chronically ill Mrs. Snow.

Pollyanna's happiness is shattered when she is struck by an automobile, leaving her unable to walk. Initially unable to apply her own philosophy to her circumstances, she eventually regains hope after learning that a risky operation in Boston may restore her ability to walk. Accompanied by Aunt Polly, she undergoes the dangerous surgery and begins a lengthy rehabilitation. During her stay in Boston, Pollyanna also helps reconcile Aunt Polly with Dr. Thomas Chilton, her former fiancé.

While recovering, Pollyanna moves into the home of the wealthy Carew family. There she learns of Mr. Carew's long search for his missing nephew, Jamie Kent, and becomes determined to help reunite them. During her search, she befriends children from different walks of life, including the newspaper boy Mickey, and comes to believe that a wheelchair-bound boy she meets may be the missing Jamie.

After completing her rehabilitation, Pollyanna returns to Beldingsville. Soon afterward, tragedy strikes when Dr. Chilton dies in an accident, leaving Aunt Polly devastated. As Pollyanna attempts to restore her aunt's happiness, new revelations emerge concerning Jimmy Bean's past and his true identity, bringing resolution to long-standing family mysteries.

Throughout the series, Pollyanna's philosophy of "finding the good" serves as its central theme. Although she briefly loses faith in it following her accident, she ultimately rediscovers its value, inspiring those around her to face hardship with hope and optimism. The philosophy also finds a parallel in Jamie's "Book of Joy", a notebook in which he records the positive moments of each day, reinforcing the series' message of resilience and gratitude.

== Characters ==
- Narrator: Taeko Nakanishi

=== Whittier Harrington and Chilton families ===
Pollyanna Whittier (ポリアンナ・フィティア, Porian'na Fitia)
Voiced by: Mitsuko Horie
The main character, she is the 8 year old daughter of Pastor John and Jennie Whittier, and niece of Polly Harrington. She lost her mother when she was 4 years old, and lost her father and became an orphan when she was 8 years old. Her principle is "seeking a good", and she often says that "I'm fond of (something)".
John Whittier (ジョン・フィティア, Jon Fitia)
Voiced by: Hideyuki Tanaka
Pollyanna's father and a pastor who taught his daughter Pollyanna to "seeking a good". When Polyanna was eight years old, he died of illness at the age of 38.
Jennie Harrington Whittier (ジェニー・ハリントン ・フィティア, Jenī Harinton Fitia)
Voiced by: Naoko Watanabe (default voice)
Pollyanna's mother, Pastor John Whittier's wife and Polly Harrington's older sister.
Polly Harrington Chilton (パレー・ハリントン ・チルトン, Parē Harinton Chiruton)
Voiced by: Masako Nozawa (default voice), Sanae Miyuki
Pollyanna's aunt and Jennie's younger sister, she is cold and drove Pollyanna into the attic.
Dr. Thomas Chilton (トーマス・チルトン博士, Tōmasu Chiruton Hakase)
Voiced by: Hideyuki Tanaka

=== Harrington family's allies ===
Nancy Hartley (ナンシー・ハートリー, Nanshī Hātorī)
Voiced by: Keiko Han
A maid of Harrington family.
Tom Peyson (トム・ペイスン, Tomu Peisun)
Voiced by: Ken'ichi Ogata
Timothy Peyson (ティモシー・ペイスン, Timoshī Peisun)
Voiced by: Hideyuki Hori
Durgin Peyson (ダージン・ペイスン, Dājin Peisun)
Voiced by: Takako Kondō

=== The Pendletons ===
John Pendleton (ジョン・ペンデルトン, Jon Penderuton)
Voiced by: Banjō Ginga
Jimmy Bean Pendleton / Jamie Kent (ジミー・ビーン・ペンデルトン /ジェイミー・ケント, Jimī Bīn Penderuton / Jeimī Kento)
Voiced by: Eiko Yamada
A Pollyanna's friend and an orphan boy. After a while, it was taken over by John Pendleton.

=== Small Midwestern town ===
Hephzibah White (ヘプジバ・ホワイト, Hepujiba Howaito)
Voiced by: Nobuko Terashima
Karen (カレン, Karen)
Voiced by: Yūki Kudō
Jeremiah White (ジェレミア・ホワイト, Jeremia Howaito)
Voiced by: Osamu Saka
Mrs. Lewis (ルイスさん, Ruisu-san)
Voiced by: Hiroko Takahashi

=== Beldingsville, Vermont ===
Mildred "Milly" Snow (ミリー・スノー, Mirī Sunō)
Voiced by: Mayumi Shō
Mrs. Snow (スノーさん, Sunō-san)
Voiced by: Taeko Nakanishi
Harold (ハロルド, Harorudo)
Voiced by: Akio Nojima
Dr. Warren (ウォーレン博士, Wōren Hakase)
Voiced by: Mahito Tsujimura
Dr. Mead (ミード博士, Mīdo Hakase)
Voiced by: Kouji Totani
Mr. Willis (ウィリスさん, Wirisu-san)
Voiced by: Tomomichi Nishimura

=== Boston, Massachusetts ===
Dr. Charlie Ames (チャーリー・エームズ博士, Chārī Ēmuzu Hakase)
Voiced by: Yasuo Muramatsu
Jamie "Young Lord James" Murphy (ジェイミー・マーフィー, Jeimī Māfī)
Voiced by: Naoko Watanabe
Mickey Murphy (ミッキー・マーフィー, Mikkī Māfī)
Voiced by: Kyouko Tonguu
Sadie Dean (サディ・ディーン, Sadi Dīn)
Voiced by: Rei Sakuma
Beth (ベス, Besu)
Voiced by: Sanae Takagi
Betty Murphy (ベティ・マーフィー, Beti Māfī)
Voiced by: Tomie Kataoka

=== Wetherby Carew and Kent families ===
Della Wetherby (デラ・ウェザビー, Dera Wezabī)
Voiced by: Rihoko Yoshida
Ruth Wetherby Carew (ルース・ウェザビー・カリウ, Rūsu Wezabī Kariu)
Voiced by: Masako Ikeda
Doris Wetherby Kent (ドリス・ウェザビー・ケント, Dorisu Wezabī Kento)
Voiced by: Arima Mizuka
Edward Kent (エドワード・ケント, Edowādo Kento)
Voiced by: Masaharu Satō

=== Wetherby family's allies ===
Mary (メアリー, Mearī)
Voiced by: Shinobu Adachi
Susy (スージー, Sūjī)
Voiced by: Yumi Takada
Bridget (ブリジット, Burijitto)
Voiced by: Natsumi Sakuma
Perkins (パーキンス, Pākinsu)
Voiced by: Keaton Yamada

== Staff ==
- Director: Kōzō Kusuba
- Character design: Yoshiharu Satō
- Music: Reijirō Koroku
- Sound director: Etsuji Yamada
- Art director: Ken Kawai
- Planning: Shōji Satō (Nippon Animation), Eiichi Kubota (Fuji TV)
- Producer: Junzō Nakajima (Nippon Animation), Taihei Ishikawa (Fuji TV)
- Production manager: Mitsuru Takakuwa

== Episodes ==
No.	Title	Original release date
1	"The Little Church Girl"; Transliteration: "Kyōkai no Chiisana Musume" (Japanese: 教会の小さな娘)	5 January 1986
Pollyanna is introduced, a nature-loving, chatty and energetic girl. Her father always advises her to be & to do right by the others, while he himself is slowly becoming morbidly sick.
2	"Don't Die, Father!"; Transliteration: "Shinanaide, Tōsan!" (Japanese: 死なないで父さん)	12 January 1986
Pollyanna starts taking care of her father, even to the point of getting strawberries from bear-infested forest. But even after all that her father passes away, before which he arranges someplace for pollyanna to be sent to.
3	"The Hymn on Top of the Hill"; Transliteration: "Okano ueno Sanbi-ka" (Japanese: 丘の上の讃美歌)	19 January 1986
It has been arranged that aunt poly from vermont will take orphan pollyanna in and pollyanna accepts.
4	"Heading to the Unknown Town"; Transliteration: "Mishiranu Machi e" (Japanese: 見知らぬ町へ)	26 January 1986
The cheerful pollyanna has arrived in beldingsville, very enthusiastic to meet her aunt polly. But that enthusiasm gets extinguished when she is told to be cooped in an attic room.
5	"Nancy's Promise"; Transliteration: "Nanshī No Yakusoku" (Japanese: ナンシーの約束)	2 February 1986
Nancy sees her crying and after cajoling her and also learning about her glad game concept, she decides to make sure her stay in this place will remain at the very least in a pleasant way.
6	"The Commotion with New Clothes"; Transliteration: "Atarashii Fuku Sodō" (Japanese: 新しい服騒動)	9 February 1986
After crying herself to sleep in her new lonely room for the very first night in there, pollyanna wakes up and gets taken to the shopping market to acquire some new clothes for her. And then at night, in the intense heat of the room, as aunt polly instructed her not to open any window to stop the flies from getting in, she rather finds another window in another room, climbs down through it to the top of the sun parlor & sleeps there for cool breeze there. Unbeknownst to her, aunt polly had heard the thumping and now thinks that robbers have attacked her domicile.
7	"Happy Punishment"; Transliteration: "Ureshii Oshioki" (Japanese: うれしいおしおき)	16 February 1986
Aunt polly is surprised to see her niece there, even more so, when she's happy to be with her aunt for the remainder of the night as a punishment. Come next morning, pollyanna had to busy from 9 am to 2 pm to do sewing, reading, piano practices and what not. So, no sooner the clock hot 2:01 pm, than she darted out the house to live as she would say it, from 2 to 6 pm. While out there, she first meets Jimmy.
8	"The Mysterious Gentleman"; Transliteration: "Fushigina Shinshi" (Japanese: 不思議な紳士)	23 February 1986
In her one of her daily noon time outings, pollyanna meets John Pendleton, the town grump, with a lot of fortune to his side and also sometimes, Jimmy, the town urchin. But it's the interactions with the latter, that got her the attention from the house-servants who tell her the whole affair of the guy named John Pendleton and why avoiding said guy would be a good idea.
9	"I Can't Leave You Alone!"; Transliteration: "Hōtte Okenaiwa" (Japanese: 放っておけないわ)	2 March 1986
This time pollyanna takes it upon herself to enliven the spirits of sickly and grumbly mrs. white and then decides to give jimmy bean, an orphan just like herself a place to work and live.
10	"I Have to Do Something!"; Transliteration: "Nantoka Shinakutcha!" (Japanese: 何とかしなくちゃ!)	9 March 1986
Back home, aunt polly straight up rejects pollyanna's pleas. Pollyanna then tries to make the local Ladies' aid agency to look into the matter, but they didn't care enough. So, she decides to build jimmy makeshift home, until a permanent domicile is arranged for him.
11	"In Pendleton Woods"; Transliteration: "Pendoruton no Mori de" (Japanese: ペンデルトンの森で)	16 March 1986
While doing that, the two find tarim, mr. pendleton's dog barking at them to follow him. Only pollyanna does and finds that mr. pendleton is hurt and needs assistance. As per his instructions, pollyanna calls the doctor mr. chilton, who reminds her of her father. After arriving at the spot, he takes mr. pendleton to the infirmatory.
12	"A Surprise for Mrs. Snow"; Transliteration: "Sunō Fujin no Odoroki" (Japanese: スノー夫人の驚き)	23 March 1986
After helping jimmy with his forest cottage building, pollyanna goes to mrs. snow to fully enliven her spirits, which works. But then she gets late for piano classes and almost gets scolded. After which, crisis strikes, her chipmunk goes missing.
13	"Aunt Polly's Pity"; Transliteration: "Obasama wa Okinodoku" (Japanese: おば様はお気の毒)	30 March 1986
Chipmunk has been found and appears to be ill. A vet gives it a medication, but Pollyanna can't take it back to her as aunt Polly forbids it. So, after some while, through the kind maid, aunt Polly finally relents in letting poor child have its pet inside the house.
14	"Memories of the Hand Mirror"; Transliteration: "Tekagami no Omoide" (Japanese: 手鏡の思い出)	6 April 1986
After seeing an old mirror & having a flashback, aunt polly decides to finally let pollyanna stay in the room next to hers. Then she decides to take some food to the injured mr. Pendleton. But only on the condition from aunt Polly that he must not know about pollyanna's true parentage.
15	"The Mysterious Tonic?"; Transliteration: "Fushigina Tokkōyaku?" (Japanese: 不思議な特効薬?)	13 April 1986
Even though promised, pollyanna lets it slip about who's she related to & that causes mr. Pendleton to get agitated, so she leaves.
16	"Don't Be Angry, Aunt Polly"; Transliteration: "Okoranaide Obasama" (Japanese: 怒らないで!おば様)	20 April 1986
When mr. pendleton sends dr. Chilton to get pollyanna, it was then that aunt polly saw the doctor & then feeling angry & shy she just left the instance, leaving pollyanna incomplete with her hairstyling.
17	"I Really Love Dr. Chilton!"; Transliteration: "Chiruton Sensei Daisuki!" (Japanese: チルトン先生大好き!)	27 April 1986
Back at the pendleton mansiom, the guy tells pollyanna how much she reminded her of a terrible memory, but now he feels like, pollyanna is needed to make a psychological recovery, which moves pollyanna.
18	"The Mystery of Mr. Pendleton"; Transliteration: "Pendoruton no Nazo" (Japanese: ペンデルトンの謎)	4 May 1986
After pollyanna fell ill in the aftermath of completing Jimmy's shabby cabin, she had to confide to nancy what mr. Pendleton told her. But nancy deduces from that that, aunt polly & mr. Pendleton might have had a relationship before having an affair-ending argument.
19	"The Surprising Secret"; Transliteration: "Odorokubeki Himitsu" (Japanese: 驚くべき秘密)	11 May 1986
Mr. Pendleton asks pollyanna to live with him as he would like to adopt her. The reason Being that his lonely house needs a cheerful & mothering woman. So, pollyanna suggests that aunt polly should also live with her as she was assumed to be mr. Pendleton's lover. But that troubles the fellow. He later says that it was actually pollyanna's mother he was bethowed to.
20	"Watch Out, Pollyanna!"; Transliteration: "Abunai, Porian'na!" (Japanese: 危ない! ポリアンナ)	18 May 1986
Pollyanna can't do that as she knows that aunt polly & her have mutually grown on each other. So, he decides to convince jimmy bean to get adopted by mr. Pendleton. But for that jimmy needs to get an unopened mail from his father in the Orphanage, which is supposed to get him clues about his lineage. Unfortunately, before they can proceed in that direction, pollyanna gets hit by an automobile, rendering her gravely injured.
21	"A Horrible Prognosis"; Transliteration: "Osoroshii Senkoku" (Japanese: 恐ろしい宣告)	25 May 1986
Even though, it was tried, pollyanna overhears the details of the terrible prognosis, which is the possibility that she will be paralyed from waist down forever.
22	"My Legs Can't Move!"; Transliteration: "Ashi ga Ugokanai!!" (Japanese: 足が動かない!!)	1 June 1986
Pollyanna is beyond devastated, she doesn't want to any eat anything anymore & no attempt from anyone to cheer her up is successful.
23	"I Can't Find Something To Be Glad About!"; Transliteration: "Yokatta ga Sagasenai!" (Japanese: よかったが探せない!)	8 June 1986
Hearing the news, every one in the town at the receiving head of her cheery smile & upbeat personality come to express their greeting and comfort to aunt polly. Mr. Pendleton decides to finally adopt jimmy & gets jimmy agree to it as that would please Pollyanna. Lastly aunt polly finally goes to her to learn about the glad game so she can appreciate how well raised she was by her sister & her husband.
24	"I Want To Walk Again!"; Transliteration: "Mō Ichido Arukitai!" (Japanese: もう一度歩きたい!)	15 June 1986
Dr. Chilton has figured how to heal pollyanna, but for that to work pollyanna would need to have a preliminary diagnosis by dr. chilton, for which he would need to get the permission of aunt polly. As aunt polly and dr. chilton had a terrible disagreement some years ago centering around pollyanna's mother Jenny marrying John Whittier, he doesn't she has forgiven him yet for that. Jimmy overhears it and convinces aunt polly to do just that.
25	"A Dangerous Operation"; Transliteration: "Kiken'na Shujyutsu" (Japanese: 危険な手術)	22 June 1986
Dr. Chilton and Aunt polly arrive at the boston infirmary where the attending doctor tells pollyanna that she has 20% of succeeding in the operation and also of dying. Aunt polly doesn't want that to happen, upon hearing pollyanna agrees to proceed with the operation.
26	"Don't Die, Pollyanna!"; Transliteration: "Shinanaide, Porian'na" (Japanese: 死なないでポリアンナ)	29 June 1986
During the 5 hours that the operation took to be successful, aunt polly and everyone kept praying and remembering how pollyanna became dear to them. Pollyanna, on the other hand, was delighted to see dr. chilton and aunt polly by her side after waking up.
27	"Ending of the First Part: I'll Become Your Love!"; Transliteration: "Dai Ichibu Kan: Ai ni Naritai" (Japanese: 第1部 完 愛になりたい)	6 July 1986
With pollyanna on the road to recovery, aunt polly and dr. chilton rekindle their relationship and agree to marriage.
28	"The Hidden Shadow"; Transliteration: "Shinobiyoru Kagei" (Japanese: 忍びよる影)	13 July 1986
Pollyanna has come back after becoming a little better which has taken 6 months. But she still has to go to boston to get her preiodic checkup. That and also, helping her husband in the clinic, is straining aunt polly's health.
29	"Goodbye, Beldingsville!"; Transliteration: "Sayonara, Beldingsville!" (Japanese: さよなら! ベルディングスビル)	20 July 1986
Seeing the strain on aunt polly and hearing from nurse delia back at the infirmatory that a lady named mrs. carew would like to have pollyanna as a companion, she agrees to go to ease up on aunt polly's burden.
30	"Life in the Big City of Boston"; Transliteration: "Daitokai Boston no Seikatsu" (Japanese: 大都会ボストンの生活)	27 July 1986
Pollyanna with nurse delia has arrived at the big city of boston where she will be living at the luxurious mansion of mrs. carew. Although mrs. carew was kind of averse to this idea of having an unknown girl live with her to enliven her spirits, she starts to get intrigued with pollyanna's sunny attitude.
31	"Chipmunk Has Gone Missing!"; Transliteration: "Chipmunk ga Inai!" (Japanese: チップマックがいない!)	3 August 1986
Chipmunk was supposed to stay outside mrs. carew's house, but come next morning pollyanna can't find her per. So, she tried looking for it in the nearby park and loses her way in the big city.
32	"Lost Pollyanna"; Transliteration: "Maigo no Pollyanna" (Japanese: 迷子のポリアンナ)	17 August 1986
After wandering for some time, pollyanna is helped by an honest newspaper boy to be returned to her home. Later, she goes out again with the assistance of some housemaid, except she does find her chipmunk, who seemed to have taken a liking to a boy in a wheelchair named james.
33	"Where is Chipmunk?"; Transliteration: "Chipmunk wa doko?" (Japanese: チップマックはどこ?)	24 August 1986
Pollyanna befriends James, who seems to have a glad game just like hers, except in his case it's a glad diary. James also seems to be family with the boy that saved pollyanna from being a few days ago, who introduces himself as Micky. Together, they hit off a lovely amicable relationship.
34	"Mrs. Carew's Sad Secret"; Transliteration: "Carew-fujin no Kanashī Himitsu" (Japanese: カリウ夫人の悲しい秘密)	31 August 1986
Mrs. Carew finally reveals to Pollyanna the reason of her isolation day-by-day. Years ago, she had a niece, not from delia, but from another sister. After she died, the boy named James was supposed to inherit all her property, but the father of that child took him away, as he objected to all this luxurious living. For six long years, she had failing to find this child of hers and overall becoming more depressed for not getting to her goal. Hearing this, pollyanna takes it upon herself to amend this pain.
35	"Young Lord James"; Transliteration: "Wakagimi James" (Japanese: 若君ジェームス)	7 September 1986
After talking to james for some time, pollyanna becomes sure that he very much could be lord james kent. So, she takes mrs. carew with her to where james lives, accompanied by micky, after getting informed by pollyanna about her suppositions about wheelcahired boy james.
36	"The Angel in the Alley"; Transliteration: "Rojiura no Tenshi" (Japanese: 路地裏の天使)	14 September 1986
Mrs. Carew does meet the paralyzed jimmy in his destitute partment, but she's not if this child is even her lost nephew. But she does make sure the residence facilities of the tenenments are upgraded, as she's the owner of those buildings. Then pollyanna tries appeal to her better nature to adopt little jamie, but is outright rejected.
37	"I Want the Real Jamie!"; Transliteration: "Hontō no Jamie ga Hoshī!!" (Japanese: 本当のジェミーが欲しい!!)	21 September 1986
Mrs. Carew goes again to jamie's place to ascertain his true origin & comes back with empty hands, with even more unsurety. After much thinking and pondering, she decides to adopt Jamie anyway, but this time, the kid himself, knowing this cause rejects the action, as if she must take him not for who she thniks he is, but for who he always claimed, a jolly boy in a wheelchair. This left Mrs. Carew in even more troubled space and she leaves slightly enraged.
38	"Why Can't I Be Happy?"; Transliteration: "Dōshite Siawaseni Narenaino?" (Japanese: どうして幸福になれないの?)	28 September 1986
After that mrs. carew seemes upset and not wanting to talk to anyone. Because of that, even though, pollyanna is cured as declared by the doctor, she doesn't wanna leave her feeling her stay was at least half successful. So, delia, the nurse, goes to her and tells her to take a hold of herself and at least be happy enough to bid pollyanna farewell. She agrees and decides to throw a farewell and also a citywide stroll throughout Boston.
39	"The Trouble at The Farewell Party"; Transliteration: "Sayonara party Jiken" (Japanese: さよならパーティ事件)	5 October 1986
Mrs. Carew is troubled to see pollyanna inviting jamie and micky, who have brought with them all the kids they know to the party. And they perform a smashing dance sequence. Pollyanna and sadie, who later started considering jamie as a good company, urged mrs. carew to have jamie in the citywide car ride they were going to go tomorrow.
40	"The Fun of Sightseeing around Boston"; Transliteration: "Tanoshī Boston Kenbutsu" (Japanese: たのしいボストン見物)	12 October 1986
Mrs. Carew grows quite affectionate of Jamie on this trip and decides to adopt Jamie for who he is, to which Jamie accepts. Back at Beldingsville, Pollyanna finds a begrudging Jimmy who has just about had it with her always mentioning Jamie. The reason being that he used to have that name, until his father, a farmhand at that changed it, on a whim.
41	"The Beginning of the Storm"; Transliteration: "Arashi no Hajimari" (Japanese: 嵐のはじまり)	19 October 1986
Pollyanna shares her experience in Boston with all of the family. At night, pollyann's uncle, Mr. Chilton arranges feast for not just the immediate friend but also the maid-servants in the house, much to the amazement of them.
42	"The Road of No Return"; Transliteration: "Ushinawareta Kaerimichi" (Japanese: 失われた帰り道)	26 October 1986
Duty called at the time of their merriment and Mr. Chilton left the party to go for a visitation to someone. While returning, he had an accident in the lighting storm and became injured remaining in a ditch.
43	"Don't Die, Dr. Chilton!"; Transliteration: "Shinanaide Chilton Sensei!" (Japanese: 死なないでチルトン先生!)	2 November 1986
Old gardener tom and his son timothy do find Mr. Chilton in that ditch, but he died shortly after arriving in his domicile, devastating everyone, specially aunt polly and Pollyanna. Getting the news about Mrs. Carew and Jamie declare that they will be arriving in Beldingsville.
44	"Overcoming Sadness"; Transliteration: "Kanashimi o norikoete" (Japanese: 悲しみをのりこえて)	9 November 1986
Aunt Polly since then has become lethargic and in total depressive mood. She doesn't eat or sleep properly. Pollyanna doesn't know how she could receive the two of them with her in this stage.
45	"The Ruined Garden"; Transliteration: "Areta Hanazono" (Japanese: 荒れた花園)	16 November 1986
Aunt Polly does receive them but in a cold manner. Later, Pollyanna was going to show Jamie all the flowers in the garden but she sees that all the roses have withered away. Because along with aunt polly, the gardener old tom also became really inattentive to his duties. But Jimmy Pendleton comes to the rescue and shakes him out of his slumber.
46	"The Mystery of Jaime Kent"; Transliteration: "Jamie Kent no Nazo" (Japanese: ジェミー・ケントの謎)	23 November 1986
Aunt Polly gets her mood changed when Mrs. Carew finds her again in the old chamber of her deceased husband and they share how she was once just like her and it wouldn't be fair for her to stay like this when Pollyanna is also mimicking her actions of abstaining from food. Hearing this, her situation changes for the better a bit. Then they both, greet Mr. Pendleton and Jimmy pendelton. Seeing the latter, Mrs. Carew can't put the finger on a distant memory.
47	"Dangerous Playtime"; Transliteration: "Kiken'na asobi" (Japanese: 危険な遊び)	30 November 1986
After arriving Jimmy Pendleton finally meets Jamie and the two, with always adored inclusion of Pollyanna hit it off around the place. Sadie, from Boston, also joins them. But then unfortunately, Pollyanna gets into an accident where she's about fall into a deep ravine to get some flowers for sadie and jamie. With them not being useful helps, she yells out to Jimmy who was to get horses.
48	"Save me, Jimmy!"; Transliteration: "Tasukete! Jamie" (Japanese: 助けて!ジェミー)	7 December 1986
Jimmy comes in the nick of time and save her. Jamie laments the fact that he couldn't be any help and sets his eyes tight on getting leg operation successful. Pollyanna sees this and becomes empathetic of his situation. Back the house, Mrs. Carew has gotten key details about possibly proving that Jimmy Pendleton could be her lost Jamie Kent.
49	"The Past Explained"; Transliteration: "Tokiakasareta Kako" (Japanese: 解きあかされた過去)	14 December 1986
One night left until Sadie, Jamie and Ms. Carew with her Delia, the nurse wil go back to boston. Before that she chats about some details regarding Jimmy Pendleton to Pollyanna and becomes sure almost that this Jimmy is her long lost Jamie. Deeply perturbed, Pollyanna thinking that this would ruin Jamie's chances of walking, she runs to Aunt Polly and tells her everything. Aunt Polly with her goes to Mr. Pendleton and communicates the situation to him. There Jimmy, finally unpacks the document that he had gotten from his father, Edward kent. The contents prove that he was the lost jamie all along. Mr. Pendleton wants to tell Ms. Carew about it, but Pollyanna objects and put the matter of the paralyzed boy Jamie upfront.
50	"I'm Jaime!"; Transliteration: "Boku ga Jamie da!" (Japanese: ボクがジェミーだ!)	21 December 1986
All things considered, it is decided, that Ms. Carew would know Jamie's true identity but she would not have him as Mr. Pendleton adopted him when he was a no one. That does get put to her and she accepts it, even though it was a hard pill to swallow. Then she decides that the true state of events would told to Jamie when he is older. But at that moment, Jamie comes in and suspects his fears became true.
51	"Happiness Nearby"; Transliteration: "Shiawase wa sugu sobani" (Japanese: 幸福はすぐそばに)	28 December 1986
Before any sombre event could follow, Mr. Pendleton comes in with the save of a generation and says the reason for all this gathering was so that he could propose to Ruth Carew. After he gets relived, events unfold quickly. Delia does depart for the city. But, all others decide to go to a mountain retreat where Mrs. Carew accepts the proposal and then she indirectly tells Jamie not to worry about him belonging or not. Some time later, Jamie would be seen playing with his old friends, with 2 of his legs working. With this all the matter being settled, Pollyanna ends the series with a monologue of always facing life's adversaries with a brave and cheery attitude.

== Theme songs ==
Opening theme

1. Happy Carnival (しあわせカーニバル, Shiawase Kānibaru) (eps 01–27)
  - Singer: Yūki Kudō
  - Lyricist: Yūho Iwasato
  - Composer: Hiroaki Serizawa
  - Arranger: Kazuya Izumi
2. I Want to See Smiling You (微笑むあなたに会いたい, Hohoemu Anata ni Aitai) (eps 28–51)
  - Singer: Yūki Kudō
  - Lyricist: Jun Asami
  - Composer: Kisaburō Suzuki
  - Arranger: Tatsumi Yano

Ending theme

1. I Want to Become Love (愛になりたい, Ai ni Naritai) (eps 01–27)
  - Singer: Yūki Kudō
  - Lyricist: Yūho Iwasato
  - Composer: Hiroaki Serizawa
  - Arranger: Kazuya Izumi
2. Happiness (幸福, Shiawase) (eps 28–51)
  - Singer: Yūki Kudō
  - Lyricist: Noriko Miura
  - Composer: Yasuo Kosugi
  - Arranger: Tatsumi Yano

Insertion song

1. Chandelier of Stardust (星屑のシャンデリア, Hoshikuzu no Shanderia) (ep 27)
  - Singer: Mitsuko Horie
  - Lyricist, composer and arranger: Akiko Kosaka
2. Dream-Colored Angel (夢色天使, Yumeiro Tenshi) (ep 51)
  - Singer: Mitsuko Horie
  - Lyricist, composer and arranger: Akiko Kosaka

Notes

Yūki Kudō has appeared in both the main story and theme songs, and played Karen in the main story.

== See also ==
- Pollyanna principle
- My Daddy Long Legs
- Jeanie with the Light Brown Hair (TV series)
