= Georgina Terry =

British actress and psychotherapist

- Born: 11 September 1990
- Occupation(s): Actress, psychotherapist
- Years active: 2003-2005
- Known for: Pollyanna, William and Mary
- Children: 1

Georgina Terry (born 11 September 1990) is a British actress and psychotherapist. She is best known for her role as the title role in the 2003 ITV production of Pollyanna, which is based upon the novel by Eleanor H. Porter. She was twelve years old when she won the role of Pollyanna, after succeeding through five auditions and despite having little professional acting experience. From 2003-2005 she also portrayed Julia Shawcross in the ITV series William and Mary.

Terry attended Cambridge University and has one daughter.
