= Freya Stephan-Kühn =

Freya Stephan-Kühn (September 25, 1943 in Ragnit, East Prussia; January 10, 2001) was a German teacher and author who became known primarily for her historical books for young people.

== Life ==
Freya Stephan-Kühn studied history and Latin philology as a teacher until 1968. After her state examination, she received her doctorate in history. From 1971, she initially worked as a history and Latin teacher, later also as head of history in teacher training. In 1986, she became head teacher at the Krefeld Ricarda-Huch Gymnasium. She also held teaching positions at the University of Düsseldorf.

Since 1974, Freya Stephan-Kühn has published numerous didactic essays and was involved in the conception of textbooks such as the history work Zeiten und Menschen and the Latin work Orbis Romanus. She also headed the North Rhine-Westphalian State Association of History Teachers.

In addition, she was interested in all kinds of historical literature for young people and its historical source value for schools and a young readership. She herself had an extensive collection of historical literature for young people, which she made accessible to the public in several exhibitions.

She herself wrote numerous historical non-fiction books with which she wanted to give children a lively and creative approach to history. Her first work, Have fun with the Romans! (1982), published by Arena-Verlag in Würzburg, was so successful that she has since also edited the Arena-Kinderbuch-Klassik series for the publisher. In the following years, she also prepared the history of ancient Egypt, Europe, the Middle Ages and the Biedermeier period for her young readers in a similar way. In 1985, she was included in the honorary list of the European Youth Book Prize in Padua. She also wrote stories and tales for various holidays.

In 1997, the Landesverband Nordrhein-Westfälischer Geschichtslehrer e.V. awarded the Freya-Stephan-Kühn-Preis for the first time. Since then, it has been awarded every two years.

Freya Stephan-Kühn died of a serious illness on January 10, 2001, at the age of only 57.

== Works (selection) ==
- 1976 Martial - Epigramme. Text selection and explanations by Freya Stephen-Kühn, Paderborn: Schöningh, ISBN 3-506-10713-5
- 1982 Viel Spaß mit den Römern, Würzburg: Arena, ISBN 3-401-04000-6
- 1984 Viel Spaß im Mittelalter, Würzburg: Arena, ISBN 3-401-04089-8
- 1988 Viel Spaß im Biedermeier, Würzburg:Arena, ISBN 3-401-04254-8
- 1990 Viel Spaß mit den alten Ägyptern, Würzburg: Arena, ISBN 3-401-04309-9
- 1991 Ritter, Burgen und Turniere, Ravensburg: Ravensburger, ISBN 3-473-35632-8
- 1992 Was in den Höhlen begann... Die Geschichte Europas in Geschichten, Würzburg: Arena, ISBN 3-401-04411-7
- 1993 Klassiker aus den Kinderzimmern Europas (exhibition at the Ricarda-Huch-Gymnasium in Krefeld), Mönchengladbach 1993.
- 1994 Das will ich wissen: The Knights, Würzburg: Arena, ISBN 3-401-04541-5
- 1994 Tannenduft und Lichterglanz. Das nostalgische Weihnachtsbuch, Würzburg; Arena, ISBN 3-401-04537-7
- 1995 Revision: Pollyanna by Eleanor Hodgman Porter, Würzburg: Arena, ISBN 3-401-04610-1
- 1996 Frühlingsstrauß und Osternest, Würzburg: Arena, ISBN 3-401-04619-5
- 1996 Auf goldenen Schwingen zur Erde herab. Ein nostalgisches Engelbuch, Würzburg: Arena, ISBN 3-401-04703-5
- 1997 Teddy, lieber Teddy, Würzburg: Arena, ISBN 3-401-04786-8
- 1997 Ich, König von Siam / I, King of Siam, bilingual edition, Zurich: KoFa Verlag, ISBN 3-906588-02-5
- 2003 Menschen, die Europa bauten, Würzburg:Arena, ISBN 3-401-02865-0 (posthumously published)
