= Harriet Lummis Smith =

American novelist

- Born: November 29, 1866; Auburndale, Massachusetts
- Died: May 9, 1947 (aged 80); Philadelphia, Pennsylvania
- Occupation: Writer (novelist)
- Spouse: William M. Smith (m. 1905)
- Writing career
- Period: 20th century
- Genres: Romance, Pollyanna

Harriet Lummis Smith (November 29, 1866 – May 9, 1947) was an American novelist.

== Early life and education ==
Harriet Lummis was born in Auburndale, Massachusetts, on November 29, 1866. Her father, Henry Lummis, was a clergyman. Her mother was Jennie Brewster. Smith had a half-brother, Charles Fletcher Lummis, by a previous marriage of her father. Her parents moved to Sheboygan, Wisconsin, where her father accepted a teaching post at Lawrence College. She attended the University of Wisconsin and graduated in 1889.

== Career ==
Lummis Smith began her career as a high school teacher. She published her first short story, "Matilda's Good Impression," in Youth's Companion in 1906 and began writing full time after a publisher said she was "wasting her time teaching." Her stories were published in national magazines and widely distributed through newspaper syndicates. Her first novel, Peggy Raymond's Success; or the Girls of Friendly Terrace (1912) became a popular series and led to her being tapped to continue the Pollyanna series by Eleanor Porter after Porter's death in 1920.

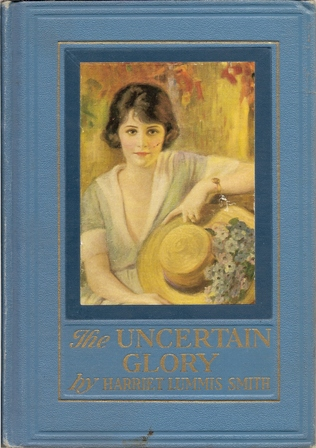
Harriet Lummis Smith: The Uncertain Glory, cover by Horace Weston Taylor, published in Boston, 1926

She was a member of the Woman's Literary Club of Baltimore and was made president in 1915. She married William M. Smith in 1905. She lived in Chicago, Baltimore and eventually Philadelphia, where she died in 1947.

== Works ==
- Peggy Raymond's Success; or, The Girls Of Friendly Terrace (1912)
- Peggy Raymond's Vacation; or, Friendly Terrace Transplanted (1913)
- Polly and the Milk Route (1913)
- Peggy Raymond's School Days; or, Old Girls And New (1916)
- Other People's Business: The Romantic Career of the Practical Miss Dale (1916)
- Peggy Raymond At 'The Poplars' (1920)
- The Friendly Terrace Quartette (1920)
- Agatha's Aunt (1920)
- Peggy Raymond's Way; or, Blossom Time At Friendly Terrace (1922)
- Pollyanna Of The Orange Blossoms (1924)
- Pollyanna's Jewels (1925)
- The Uncertain Glory (1926)
- Pollyanna's Debt Of Honor (1927)
- Pat And Pal (1928)
- Pollyanna's Western Adventure (1929)
