= Pollyanna =

1913 children's novel by Eleanor H. Porter

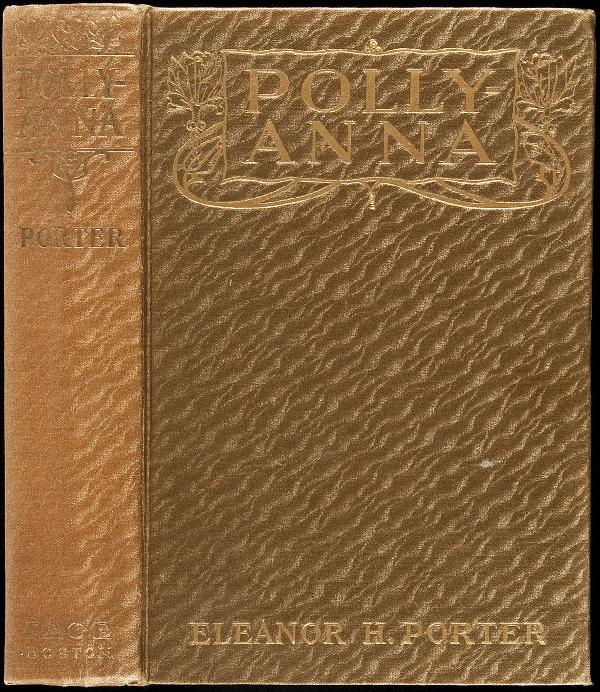
- First edition
- Author: Eleanor H. Porter
- Language: English
- Genre: Children's literature
- Publisher: L.C. Page
- Publication date: 1913; 113 years ago
- Publication place: United States
- Media type: Print (hardcover)
- Pages: 285
- ISBN: 1-55748-660-3
- OCLC: 33897078
- Followed by: Pollyanna Grows Up
- Text: Pollyanna at Wikisource

Pollyanna is a 1913 novel by American author Eleanor H. Porter, considered a classic of children's literature. The book's success led to Porter soon writing a sequel, Pollyanna Grows Up (1915). Eleven more Pollyanna sequels, known as "Glad Books", were later published, most of them written by Elizabeth Borton or Harriet Lummis Smith. Further sequels followed, including Pollyanna Plays the Game by Colleen L. Reece, published in 1997.

Due to the book's fame, "Pollyanna" has become a byword for someone who, like the title character, has an unfailingly optimistic outlook; a subconscious bias towards the positive is often described as the Pollyanna principle. Despite the use of the term to mean "excessively cheerful", in the context of the novel it means to always see the good side of the situation.

Pollyanna has been adapted for film several times. Some of the best known are the 1920 version starring Mary Pickford, and Disney's 1960 version starring child actress Hayley Mills, who won a special Oscar for the role.

== Plot ==
The title character is Pollyanna Whittier, an eleven-year-old orphan who goes to live in the fictional town of Beldingsville, Vermont, with her wealthy but stern and cold spinster Aunt Polly Harrington, who does not want to take in Pollyanna but feels it is her duty to her late sister Jennie. Pollyanna's philosophy of life centers on what she calls "The Glad Game", an optimistic and positive attitude she learned from her father. The game consists of finding something to be glad about in every situation, no matter how bleak it may be. It originated in an incident one Christmas when Pollyanna, who was hoping for a doll in the missionary barrel, found only a pair of crutches inside. Making the game up on the spot, Pollyanna's father taught her to look at the good side of things—in this case, to be glad about the crutches because she did not need to use them.

This philosophy, coupled with her own sunny personality, allows Pollyanna to reimagine her aunt's dispirited New England town in a brighter, more cheerful way. The Glad Game shields her from her aunt's more stern attitude: when Aunt Polly puts her in a stuffy attic room without carpets or pictures, she finds solace in the beautiful view from the high window; when Aunt Polly tries to "punish" her niece for being late to dinner by sentencing her to a meal of bread and milk in the kitchen with the servant Nancy, Pollyanna thanks her rapturously because she likes bread and milk, and she likes Nancy.

Soon Pollyanna teaches some of Beldingsville's most troubled inhabitants to "play the game" as well, from Mrs. Snow, a querulous invalid, to Mr. Pendleton, a miserly bachelor who lives all alone in a cluttered mansion. Aunt Polly, too—finding herself helpless before Pollyanna's buoyant refusal to be downcast—gradually begins to thaw, although she resists the Glad Game longer than anyone else.

Eventually, however, even Pollyanna's robust optimism is put to the test when she is struck by a car and loses the use of her legs. At first, she does not realize the seriousness of her injury, but her spirits plummet when she learns she will probably never walk again. After that, she lies in bed, unable to find anything to be glad about. Then the townspeople begin calling at Aunt Polly's house, eager to let Pollyanna know how much her encouragement has improved their lives; and Pollyanna decides she can still be glad that she at least had her legs. The novel ends with Aunt Polly marrying her former lover Dr. Chilton and Pollyanna being sent to a specialist in spinal injuries, where she learns to walk again and is able to appreciate the use of her legs far more as a result of being temporarily disabled and unable to walk well.

== Characters ==
- Pollyanna Whittier – The title character, who moves from the West to New England.
- Polly Harrington – Pollyanna's aunt.
- Nancy – the maid at Polly Harrington's house.
- Thomas "Old Tom" Durgan – the elderly gardener at Miss Polly's.
- Timothy Durgan – Thomas Durgan's son.
- Mr. John Pendleton – an angry, unsociable old miser, and former suitor of Pollyanna's mother.
- Dr. Thomas Chilton – a lonely physician, and former suitor to Miss Polly.
- Mrs. Snow – a fretful invalid.
- Millie Snow – Mrs. Snow's daughter.
- Jimmy Bean – an orphan boy, who is later adopted by Mr. Pendleton.
- Rev. Paul Ford – the town clergyman.

== Influence ==
As a result of the novel's success, the adjective "Pollyannaish" and the noun "Pollyannaism" became popular terms for a personality type characterised by irrepressible optimism evident in the face of even the most adverse or discouraging of circumstances. It is sometimes used pejoratively, referring to someone whose optimism is excessive to the point of naïveté or refusing to accept the facts of an unfortunate situation. This pejorative use can be heard in the introduction of the 1930 George and Ira Gershwin song "But Not For Me": "I never want to hear from any cheerful pollyannas/who tell me fate supplies a mate/that's all bananas" (performed by Judy Garland in the 1943 movie Girl Crazy).

The word "pollyanna" may also be used colloquially to denote a holiday gift exchange more typically known as Secret Santa, especially in Philadelphia and the surrounding areas.

At the height of her popularity, Pollyanna was known as "The Glad Girl", and Parker Brothers even created The Glad Game, a board game. The Glad Game, a type of Parcheesi, was made and sold from 1915 to 1967 in various versions, similar to the popular UK board game Ludo. The board game was later licensed by Parker Brothers but has been discontinued for many years. A Broadway adaptation was mounted in 1916 titled Pollyanna Whittier, The Glad Girl. Helen Hayes was the star.

Author Jerome (Jerry) Griswold analysed Pollyanna together with juvenile 'heroes' in several well-known children's books, e.g., Little Lord Fauntleroy, Rebecca of Sunnybrook Farm (both also portrayed by Pickford on film) and The Secret Garden from the era known as the Golden Age of Children's Books (approximately the American Civil War to World War I). With reference to the Theory of the Three Lives of the Child Hero, he posits that, in Pollyanna, clear oedipal tensions exist, albeit in disguised or projected forms, in the relationships between the child, her Aunt and the principal male adult characters, which are only resolved by the Aunt marrying Dr. Chilton at the end of the story. He calls Pollyanna 'a complex novel replete with disguises' and sees Pollyanna, not as a naïve child but, rather, as a gifted individual with the ability to direct her extreme optimism and good-naturedness (for the good) towards the manipulating of the negative, worldly, cynical or disillusioned emotions of the adults that inhabit her life.

"Glad Clubs" appear to have been popular for a while; however, it is questionable if they were ever more than a publicity gimmick. Glad Clubs may have been simply a means to popularize The Glad Game as a method for coping with the vicissitudes of life such as loss, disappointment, and distress. Nevertheless, at least one "glad club" existed as recently as 2008, in Denver, Colorado.

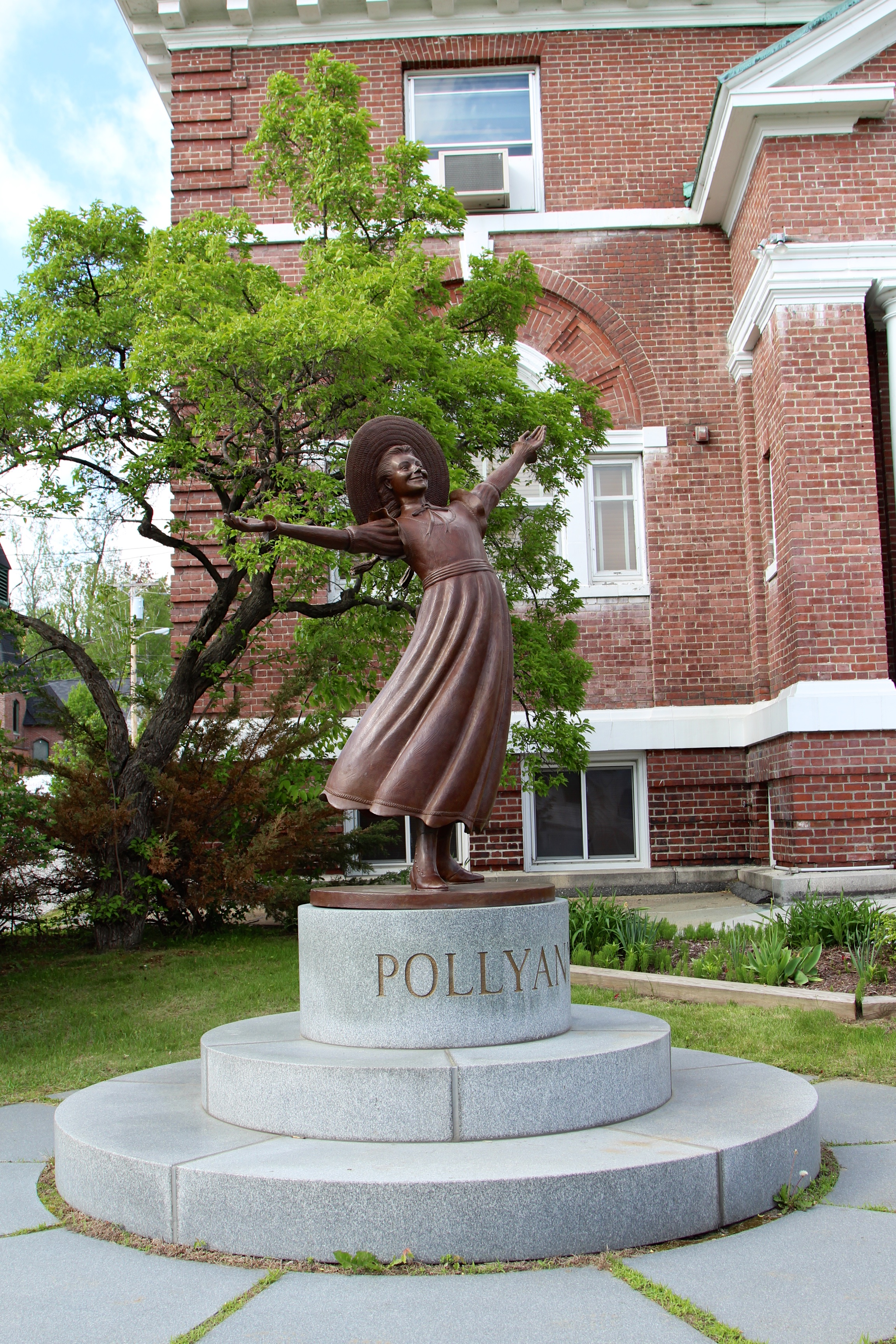
Pollyanna statue in front of the public library in Littleton, New Hampshire

In 2002 the citizens of Littleton, New Hampshire unveiled a bronze statue in honor of Eleanor H. Porter, author of the Pollyanna books and one of the town's most famous residents. The statue depicts a smiling Pollyanna, arms flung wide in greeting. Littleton also hosts a festival known as "The Official Pollyanna Glad Day" every summer.

The celebrated American science fiction writer Ray Bradbury described himself as "Janus, the two-faced god who is half Pollyanna and half Cassandra, warning of the future and perhaps living too much in the past—a combination of both".

In a 1973 State of the Union message to Congress Richard M. Nixon wrote, "I believe there is always a sensible middle ground between the Cassandras and the Pollyannas. We must take our stand upon that ground."

The video game series Mother (known in the U.S. as EarthBound) has consistently featured variations of a certain song, which in its first incarnation was called Pollyanna. The title is a reference to the novel, and a lyrical version released on the game's official arranged soundtrack CD is told from the perspective of a woman who would gladly be "called Pollyanna", or otherwise be considered foolish in her unyielding optimism.

Green Day released a song called "Pollyanna" in 2021. The song title refers to excessive optimism, and also refers to the main protagonist of the novel.

== List of Pollyanna books ==
=== Glad Books ===
- Eleanor Porter
  - Pollyanna: The First Glad Book
  - Pollyanna Grows Up: The Second Glad Book
- Harriet Lummis Smith
  - Pollyanna of the Orange Blossoms: The Third Glad Book
  - Pollyanna's Jewels: The Fourth Glad Book
  - Pollyanna's Debt of Honor: The Fifth Glad Book
  - Pollyanna's Western Adventure: The Sixth Glad Book
- Elizabeth Borton
  - Pollyanna in Hollywood: The Seventh Glad Book
  - Pollyanna's Castle in Mexico: The Eighth Glad Book
  - Pollyanna's Door to Happiness: The Ninth Glad Book (1937)
  - Pollyanna's Golden Horseshoe: The Tenth Glad Book
- Margaret Piper Chalmers
  - Pollyanna's Protegee: The Eleventh Glad Book
- Virginia May Moffitt
  - Pollyanna at Six Star Ranch: The Twelfth Glad Book
  - Pollyanna of Magic Valley: The Thirteenth Glad Book
- Elizabeth Borton
  - Pollyanna and the Secret Mission: The Fourteenth Glad Book

=== Further sequels ===
- Reece, Colleen L.
  - Pollyanna Comes Home
  - Pollyanna Plays the Game

== Adaptations ==
=== 1915 play ===
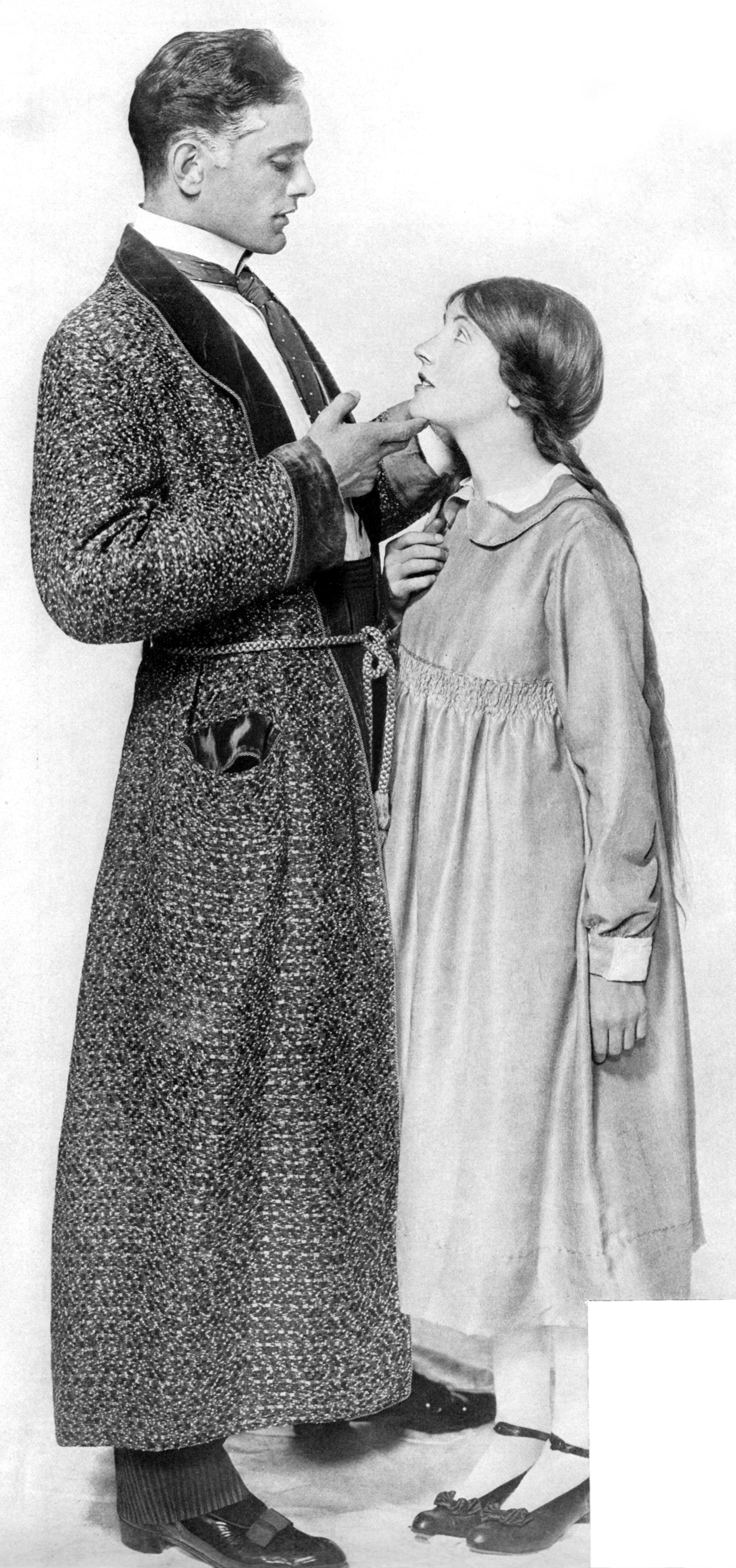
Philip Merivale and Patricia Collinge in the Broadway production of Pollyanna (1916)

In 1915, Catherine Chisholm Cushing published Pollyanna: The Glad Girl, a four-act comedy which was produced with great success in Philadelphia starring Patricia Collinge as Pollyanna. A critic at the time wrote that: "Mrs. Cushing has slashed and sliced and revised and twisted the story of Pollyanna and her infectious gladness until it has become swift-moving, intensely dramatic and very real." In 1918 and 1919 the play toured the U.S. and Canada with 19-year-old Viola Harper (née Harpman) in the title role.

=== 1920 film ===
The 1920 American silent melodrama/comedy film Pollyanna starred Mary Pickford and was directed by Paul Powell. It was Pickford's first motion picture for United Artists. It became a major success and would be regarded as one of Pickford's most defining pictures. The film grossed $1.1 million (approximately $17,679,000 today).

=== 1954 telenovela ===
Brazilian soap opera produced by Rede Tupi, in 1954 with 12 chapters shown twice a week, adapted by Tatiana Belincky.

=== 1958 telenovela ===
Remake Brazilian produced by TV Tupi, in 1958 with 60 chapters, adapted by Tatiana Belincky and starring Verinha Darcy again as the protagonist.

=== 1960 film ===
A Walt Disney film, Pollyanna, was released in 1960, starring English actress Hayley Mills in the title role (which made her a Hollywood star and led to a Disney contract). It was directed by David Swift. The film was a major hit for the Disney Studios. It also marked the last film appearance of Hollywood actor Adolphe Menjou, who played the reclusive Mr. Pendergast.

=== 1971 film ===
The Turkish musical drama comedy film Hayat Sevince Güzel (literally: "Loving makes life beautiful"), is loosely based on Pollyanna. The film stars Turkish actress Zeynep Degirmencioglu.

=== 1973 serial ===
The BBC produced a six-part TV serial in 1973 starring Colyton Grammar School pupil Elizabeth Archard as Pollyanna and Elaine Stritch as Aunt Polly. This ran in the Sunday tea-time slot, which often featured reasonably faithful adaptations of classic novels aimed at a family audience, although in this instance it followed the Disney film (and not the original novel) by having Pollyanna injured in a fall from a tree.

=== 1982 TV movie ===
The Adventures of Pollyanna aired on The Magical World of Disney, starring Patsy Kensit as Pollyanna and Shirley Jones as Aunt Polly.

=== 1986 TV series ===
Nippon Animation of Japan released Ai Shoujo Pollyanna Monogatari (The Story of Pollyanna, Girl of Love), a fifty-one episode anime television series that made up the 1986 installment of the studio's World Masterpiece Theater, and had famous singer Mitsuko Horie playing the role of Pollyanna.

=== 1989 film ===
Polly is a 1989 American made-for-television musical film featuring an African-American cast. It was directed and choreographed by Debbie Allen, starring Keshia Knight Pulliam, Phylicia Rashad and featured the final performance of Butterfly McQueen. Polly was originally broadcast on NBC on November 12, 1989. It also had a sequel, Polly: Coming Home in 1990.

=== 2003 film ===
A 2003 Carlton Television TV film version of Pollyanna starring Amanda Burton as Aunt Polly and Georgina Terry uses the original characterizations and storylines, but takes place in an English village rather than Vermont (only the scenery and accents show this—the town is still called Beldingsville). Like the book, it ends with Aunt Polly and Dr. Chilton married and Pollyanna walking, but the scene is the actual wedding with Pollyanna back for a visit rather than a letter as in the book.

=== 2018 telenovela ===
A 2018 Brazilian telenovela new version of "Pollyanna" called As Aventuras de Poliana (The Adventures of Pollyanna) premiered on SBT on May 16. The telenovela stars Sophia Valverde as Pollyanna. It is directed by Reynaldo Boury.

== See also ==
- Candide, a 1759 anti-religious satire which parodies Leibnizian optimism.
