= David Swift (director) =

American filmmaker (1919–2001)

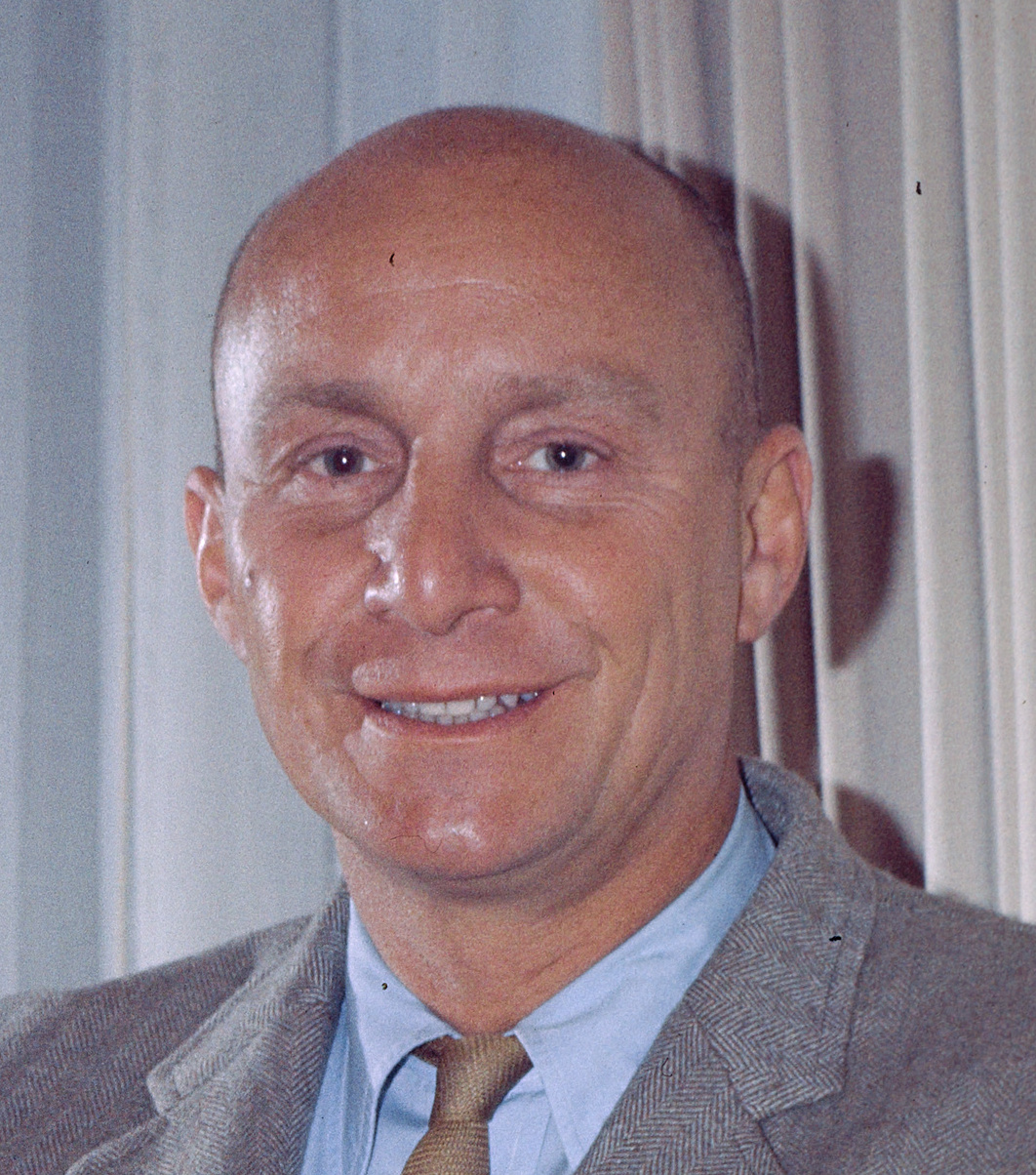
- Swift in 1964
- Born: July 27, 1919; Minneapolis, Minnesota, U.S.
- Died: December 31, 2001 (aged 82); Santa Monica, California, U.S.
- Other names: Bud Swift; Dave Swift
- Education: Hollywood High School
- Occupations: Screenwriter; director; producer; animator; actor
- Years active: 1937–1998
- Spouse(s): Maggie McNamara (m. 1951–1957) Micheline Swift (m. 1957–2001)
- Children: 2

David "Dave" Swift (July 27, 1919 – December 31, 2001) was an American screenwriter, animator, director, and producer. Swift began his career as an animator and filmmaker at The Walt Disney Studios, and adapted the story of Pollyanna for a 1960 film adaptation while working there. He later wrote and directed The Parent Trap (1961) as well as How to Succeed in Business Without Really Trying (1967).

== Life and career ==
Born in Minneapolis, Swift's father owned a factory that made sausage casings. After the depression, he dropped out of school at the age of 17 and boarded a freight train to California to pursue his goal of working for Walt Disney. After arriving in Los Angeles, Swift worked several odd jobs to earn money including working as an usher at the Warner Bros. theatre. In between work, he attended art school and also attended Hollywood High School at night. He began his career at The Walt Disney Studio as an office boy and rose to be an assistant animator under Ward Kimball in 1938.

After serving with the 8th Air Force during World War II, Swift became a radio and television writer. He attracted acclaim as the creator of Mister Peepers. Swift re-joined Disney as the writer, director and producer of Pollyanna (1960), followed by The Parent Trap (1961). After making Love Is a Ball, Swift was then contracted to Columbia Pictures for The Interns, Under the Yum Yum Tree and Good Neighbor Sam, the latter two with Jack Lemmon. He also created the TV shows Grindl, Camp Runamuck, and Arnie. Swift returned to Disney to write Candleshoe in 1977.

During the 1980s, he worked as a writer and director for television. His final project was the screenplay for the 1998 remake of The Parent Trap, starring Lindsay Lohan, Natasha Richardson and Dennis Quaid.

== Personal life ==
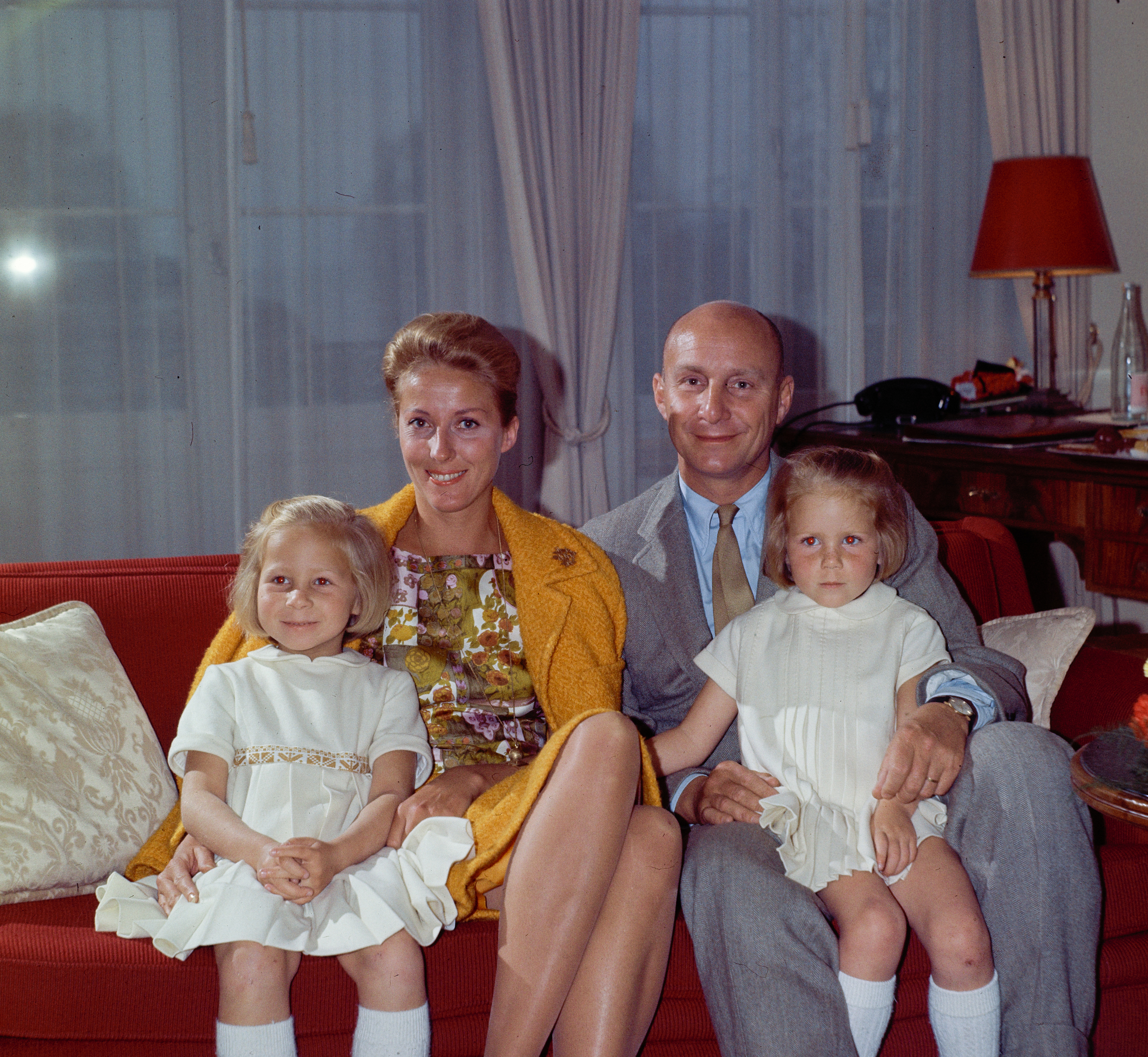
David Swift with his family. Wife Micheline Swift and their two daughters Michele and Wendon (1964)

In 1951, Swift married actress Maggie McNamara. They later divorced. He married model Micheline Swift in 1957 to whom he remained married until his death. The couple had two daughters, Michelle and Wendon.

== Death ==
On December 31, 2001, Swift died of heart failure at St. John's Health Center in Santa Monica, California, at the age of 82.
