= Pollyanna Grows Up =

1915 book by Eleanor H. Porter

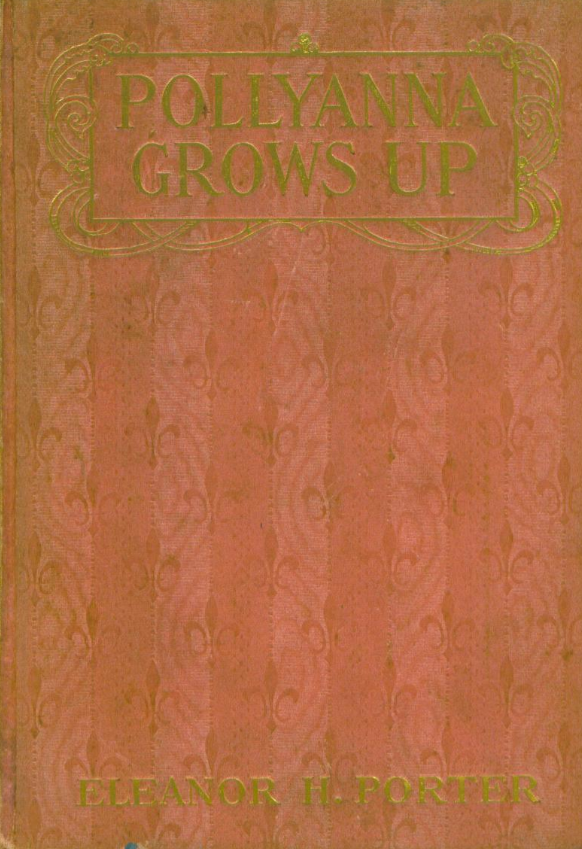
- Author: Eleanor H. Porter
- Illustrator: H. Weston Taylor
- Language: English
- Series: The Glad Books
- Genre: Romance, Young adult literature, Children's literature
- Publisher: The Page Company
- Publication date: March 27, 1915
- Publication place: United States
- Media type: Print (hardcover)
- Pages: 308
- Preceded by: Pollyanna
- Followed by: Pollyanna of the Orange Blossoms
- Text: Pollyanna Grows Up at Wikisource

Pollyanna Grows Up is a 1915 children's novel by Eleanor H. Porter. It is the first of many sequels to Porter's best-selling Pollyanna (1913), but is the only one written by Porter herself; the numerous later additions to the Pollyanna franchise were the work of other authors.

== Plot introduction ==
Pollyanna is sent to Boston by her aunt to cheer up Mrs. Carew (née Ruth Weatherby), an old friend of Dr. Ames, who had cured Pollyanna's crippling spinal injury. Unaware of her role as a "happiness medicine", Pollyanna quickly charms the servants in Mrs. Carew's household, although Mrs. Carew herself remains unhappy. The root cause of Mrs. Carew's unhappiness is that her estranged brother-in-law had vanished with her nephew, Jamie, who had become the darling of the Weatherby family. While Mrs. Carew coops herself in the house, Pollyanna explores Boston, meeting new friends Sadie Dean and "Sir James". Sir James is a delicate literary genius whose withered legs compel him to rely on a wheelchair and crutches, something Pollyanna immediately empathizes with. When she learns that Sir James' real name is Jamie, and that he is an orphan, Pollyanna persuades Mrs. Carew to see Jamie. Mrs. Carew is unable to confirm if Jamie is her nephew, but on seeing that Jamie's adoptive family live in abject poverty and under Pollyanna's influence, she uses her wealth to improve their living conditions. Eventually, she adopts Jamie and treats him as her nephew, transforming both her and Jamie's lives.

The latter part of the book is set eight years later. Now twenty, Pollyanna and her aunt fall upon hard times after the death of Dr. Chilton. Needing the money, Pollyanna and her aunt take in the friends Pollyanna made eight years earlier as summer boarders. The summer vacation changes their lives, as the Carews quickly befriend Pollyanna's neighbours, the Pendletons. Friendship blossoms into love as Sadie Dean & Jamie, John Pendleton & Mrs. Carew, and Pollyanna & Jimmy Bean (now Jimmy Pendleton) fall in love with one another. Aunt Polly at first refuses to sanction Pollyanna's marriage to Jimmy Bean, but after it is revealed that Jimmy is Mrs. Carew's missing nephew, she changes her mind. Fears that Mrs. Carew might disown Jamie prove unfounded. The novel ends with Pollyanna declaring how glad she is for everything, and Jimmy telling her, "God grant, little girl, that always it may be so—with you."

== Characters ==
- Pollyanna Whittier—relentlessly positive orphaned girl, born in a “faraway western town”, moved to rural Vermont at age eleven and gradually wins over her aunt Polly.
- (Aunt) Polly (Harrington) Chilton—Pollyanna’s custodial maternal aunt who is gradually won over by her lively niece
- (Dr.) Thomas Chilton—Polly (Harrington) Chilton’s husband
- John Pendleton—Affluent Vermont bachelor, previously rejected as a suitor by Pollyanna’s late mother Jennie
- Jamie "Jimmy Bean" Kent—orphaned son of John Kent and Doris (Wetherby) Kent, lived with his father after his mother’s death, alone in an orphanage after his father’s death, and adopted by John Pendleton after fleeing the orphanage, known as Jimmy Bean before adoption by John Pendleton, known as Jimmy Pendleton after adoption by John Pendleton
- "Jamie"—friend to Pollyanna in Boston, last name not known, referred to as "Sir James" by Jerry Murphy, originally a wheelchair user and cared for by "Mumsey" and Jerry Murphy, later adopted by Ruth Carew and able to walk with crutches, incorrectly suspected of actually being Jamie Kent
- William Wetherby—father to Della Wetherby, Ruth (Wetherby) Carew, and Doris (Wetherby) Kent
- Della Wetherby—nurse working at the sanatorium, involved in Pollyanna’s care
- Ruth (Wetherby) Carew—wealthy dowager, widowed after a year of marriage to an older unnamed husband, with whom she’d had a son who died within a year after her husband’s death
- Doris (Wetherby) Kent—deceased sister of Ruth and Della
- John Kent—deceased widower of Doris (Wetherby) Kent
- Jerry Murphy—Boston newspaper hawker and friend to "Jamie"
- "Mumsey"—surrogate mother to "Jamie", suffers from rheumatoid arthritis
- Sadie Dean—Boston salesgirl
- "Sir Lancelot", "Lady Rowena", "Guinevere"—squirrels fed by "Jamie" and Pollyanna in Boston Public Garden
- "The Professor"—deceased father to “Jamie”, actual name not known
- Mary—maid who works for Ruth (Wetherby) Carew
- Charlie Ames—colleague to Della Wetherby at the Boston sanatorium
- Susie Smith—child from Honolulu, casual acquaintance to Pollyanna
- Henry Dodge—property manager employed by Ruth Carew, makes her into an unknowing slumlord
- Tommy Dolan, Jenny Dolan—neighbors to Jamie Kent, "Mumsey" and Jerry Murphy
- “Old” Tom Durgin, Timothy Durgin, Nancy Durgin, Mary Durgin—charged with the care of the Chilton household in Vermont during the family's absence
- Milly Snow—freelance typist in Vermont
- Nellie Mahoney, Mrs. Tibbits—community members in Vermont
- Mrs. Jones, Mrs. Peck—twin sisters and Ladies' Aiders in a "faraway western town"

== Reception ==
The Morning Union wrote that it is "good as it can be" and that it "will come as a real joy" to those who had enjoyed the first novel.

== Adaptation ==
In 1986, Nippon Animation produced the 51-episode anime The Story of Pollyanna, Girl of Love as part of the World Masterpiece Theater series. Episodes 28 to 51 are based on the second novel, with one major difference: the time skip is omitted and Pollyanna remains a child throughout the story; consequently, the romantic element is absent.
