= Just David =

1916 novel by Eleanor H. Porter

- 1916 Cover
- Author: Eleanor H. Porter
- Language: English
- Genre: Children's literature
- Publisher: Houghton Mifflin Co
- Publication date: March 1916
- Publication place: United States
- Media type: Print (Hardcover)
- Pages: 324
- ISBN: 1-888692-05-7

Just David is a 1916 children's novel by Eleanor H. Porter. It was among the top six bestsellers in cities across the United States in 1916, and in July 1916 it was the second bestselling novel.

Originally published by Houghton Mifflin, it tells the story of a young boy, David, who must learn to adapt to living with others after the death of his reclusive father; along the way, the villagers and his adoptive parents adapt as much or more to him. Though criticized by reviewers as "mush" and "too perfectly lovely," the novel was very popular in the early half of the twentieth century in middle and high schools, and has recently seen a number of reprints. The novel was transcribed in Braille in 1922, and translated in Chinese (1959), Russian (2005), Italian (2019) and Vietnamese (2019)

== Plot ==
David is a ten-year-old boy who plays the violin and does not know his last name. He leads an idyllic life in the mountains with his father, until his father becomes gravely ill, forcing them to go down into the valley. With his father's health worsening, they spend the night in a barn. Just before he dies, the father gives David a large number of gold coins, telling him to hide them until they are needed. David plays the violin to soothe his "sleeping father" and is found by Simeon Holly and his wife. Realizing the man is dead, they try to figure out who David is, but all he can tell them is that he is "just David."

David is unable to tell them his last name, his father's name, or if he has any relatives. They find some letters on the dead man, but the signature on it is illegible. The couple reluctantly let him stay with them as he reminds them of their own son, John, whom they no longer speak with. David learns to adjust to live in the village, taking one of his two violins with him wherever he goes and "playing" the world around him, such as playing "the sunset" and "the flowers," and using his music to express his feelings. His innocence and musical skills charm the villagers and change several of their lives, uniting in marriage two childhood sweethearts who had grown apart. He also changes the Hollys, healing Simeon's heart enough that he reconnects with his son and allows him to come visit with his new wife and child.

During the visit, they learn that David's violins are quite valuable. His own is an Amati and his father's, which he had loaned to a blind friend, a Stradivarius. Reading the old letter from David's father, John recognizes the signature and realizes that David's father was a world-famous violinist who had disappeared with his son after his wife's death. David is sent to be reunited with his relatives and to study the violin. He becomes famous and wealthy, but continues to visit the Hollys every year to play for them.

== Themes ==
David, who barely understands death, is raised in an environment that has prevented him from learning sin or evil, in what critics have called a "glad book." The overall optimism of the book was noted in the 1917 American Library Annual, which applied to it the generic term of "the pleasant story." The widespread theme of the orphan in American literature is central in the main character of Just David, who through his extraordinary talent restores order to the community and heals broken relationships.

== Reception ==
Just David was the second in a string of four bestsellers for Porter between 1913 and 1918. According to The Bookman, in 1916-1917 Just David was among the top six bestsellers in cities across the United States, and in July 1916 it was the second bestselling novel of 1916. Publishers Weekly printed similar numbers. According to The American Library Annual (using information compiled from Publishers Weekly), Just David was the number three book of the year.

Its critical reception was less positive. The Bookman reviewer James L. Ford referred to the novel as "mush". A New York Times reviewer felt the novel was predictable, stating "of course, at the end [David's] identity was discovered, all the good people were rewarded, and everything was just too perfectly lovely for words."

Studies did, however, establish that the novel remained popular with young readers, especially, according to The School Review, among girls. Various studies by The English Journal on the reading habits of junior high students indicated that many of them read and had enjoyed the novel. In the 1920s, it was even transcribed into Braille, but by the 1930s, its popularity in the United States had waned. Chinese and Russian translations appeared in 1959 and 2005, respectively.

More recently, critics have found other matters of interest in the sentimental literature of the period; Just David has been studied for its main character's status as an orphan in a study of fictional orphans' roles in restoring social and personal harmony in their community.

== Editions and translations ==
=== In English ===
- Porter, Eleanor Hodgman; Helen Mason Grose (ills.) (1916). Just David. Houghton Mifflin Company, Riverside Press.
- Porter, Eleanor H. (2007). Just David. Fairfield: 1st World Library-Literary Society. ISBN 978-1-4218-9427-0.

=== In Chinese ===
- Porter, Eleanor H. (1959). 神祕的大衞 / Shen mi de Dawei. Baozhen Li (trans.). Xianggang: Xianggang wan li shu dian. OCLC 36436210.

=== In Russian ===
- Porter, Eleanor H. (2005). Просто Давид / Prosto David. Alekseĭ Selich (trans.). Kremenchug: Khristianskai︠a︡ Zari︠a︡. ISBN 978-966-8031-46-5.

=== In Turkish ===
- Porter, Eleanor H. (1952). Küçük Kemancı. Nebil Otman (trans.). İstanbul: Ahmet Halit Yaşaroğlu Kitapçılık ve Kağıtçılık. p. 160.
- Porter, Eleanor H. (1982). Küçük Kemancı. Gülten Suveren (trans.). İstanbul: Altın Çocuk Kitapları. p. 203.

=== In Italian ===
- Porter, Eleanor H. (2019). Solo David. Elizabeth Harrowell (trans.). Roma: flower-ed. ISBN 978-88-85628-61-8.

=== In Kurdish ===
- Porter, Eleanor H. (2021). Kemanjenê piçûk. Aynur Ilı trans.). Istanbul: Rêdûr Dîjle. ISBN 978-975-8242-23-8.

=== In Vietnamese ===
- Porter, Eleanor H. (2019). David - Cây vĩ cầm biết nói. Đặng Việt Vân Hà (trans.). Hanoi: Lao Động. ISBN 978-604-9831-21-8.
