= William and Mary (TV series) =

British television programme

- Genre: Romantic dramedy
- Starring: Julie Graham; Martin Clunes
- Country of origin: United Kingdom
- Original language: English
- No. of series: 3
- No. of episodes: 18

Production
- Running time: 48 minutes
- Production company: Meridian Television

Original release
- Network: ITV
- Release: 23 March 2003 – 22 May 2005

William and Mary is an ITV romantic drama set in London, starring Martin Clunes as William Shawcross, an undertaker, and Julie Graham as Mary Gilcrest, a midwife. Its title refers to its two principal characters and is a cultural reference to the reign of the British monarchs William III and Mary II. It was shown in three six-part series between 23 March 2003 and 22 May 2005. It was also screened in Australia on 7TWO.

== Main cast ==
- Martin Clunes - William Shawcross (18 episodes, 2003–2005)
- Julie Graham - Mary Gilcrest (18 episodes, 2003–2005)
- Cheryl Campbell - Molly Gilcrest Straud (18 episodes, 2003–2005)
- Michael Begley - Rick Straud (18 episodes, 2003–2005)
- Claire Hackett - Doris (18 episodes, 2003–2005)
- Peta Cornish - Kate Shawcross (18 episodes, 2003–2005)
- Ricci McLeod - Brendan Gilcrest (18 episodes, 2003–2005)
- Dominick Baron - Terence Gilcrest (18 episodes, 2003–2005)
- Georgina Terry - Julia Shawcross (18 episodes, 2003–2005)
- James Greene - Arnold McKinnon (17 episodes, 2003–2005)
- June Watson - Mrs. Ball (16 episodes, 2003–2005)
- Catherine Terris - Jane Spalding (15 episodes, 2003–2005)
- David Kennedy - Billy Two Hats (14 episodes, 2003–2005)
- The Emerald Dogs - The Band (11 episodes, 2003–2005)
- Paterson Joseph - Reuben (10 episodes, 2003–2005)
- Max and Harvey Mills as Thomas (6 episodes, 2005)
- Peter Pacey - Nicholas (3 episodes, 2003–2004)

== Plot ==
The story revolves around William Shawcross and Mary Gilcrest, along with William's two daughters Kate and Julia, Mary's two sons Brendan and Terence, William’s business associates Arnold and Jane, his housekeeper Mrs Ball, his bandleader Billy Two Hats, his cousin and solicitor Nicholas, Mary’s mother Molly, her ex husband Reuben, her ex boyfriend Rick, and her midwife associate Doris. William is an undertaker and Mary a midwife; according to Mary, they “complete the circle … I see them into the world and you see them out”. Subplots regularly involve their work with clients. William is also an avid musician, singing in a choir and playing in a band, and music figures prominently in the story and the production.

All episodes are written by Mick Ford and produced by Trevor Hopkins.

== Episodes ==
Series	Episodes	Originally released	
Series	Episodes	First released	Last released
1	6	23 March 2003	27 April 2003
2	6	7 March 2004	11 April 2004
3	6	17 April 2005	22 May 2005

=== Series 1 (2003) ===
No. overall	No. in series	Directed by	Written by	Original release date	Viewers (millions)
1	1	Jean Stewart	Mick Ford	23 March 2003	8.62
William and Mary meet through a computerized introduction service. On their disastrous first date, Mary stipulates that work is a “banned topic”. When it turns out they have a client in common, she discovers what line of work William is in.
2	2	Jean Stewart	Mick Ford	30 March 2003	8.59
William realizes that concealing his occupation has broken trust with Mary, and at the urging of an elderly client, writes to her to try to patch things up. Molly intercepts his letter. William follows up with a note, leading Mary to investigate. When Mary discovers Molly purloined the letter, she demands Molly move out, and decides to give William a second chance. Meanwhile Mary must cope with a truant Terence.
3	3	Matthew Evans	Mick Ford	6 April 2003	7.95
William and Mary panic when a scheduling snafu brings their daughters and sons together without benefit of their introductions. When Julia disappears, William knows where to find her. Mary saves a baby’s life and is disciplined for her risk taking. William's latest funeral service sparks fireworks. Featured music: Jerusalem by William Blake and Sir Hubert Parry.
4	4	Matthew Evans	Mick Ford	13 April 2003	8.01
Brendan and Kate want to go to a party with some acquaintances, who then are killed in a car accident. Now homeless Molly turns to Mary’s ex boyfriend Rick for shelter and solace. Featured music: "My Very Good Friend, the Milkman" by Harold Spina and Johnny Burke, performed by Fats Waller, and Why Does It Always Rain on Me? by Travis.
5	5	Stuart Orme	Mick Ford	20 April 2003	7.50
William’s mother’s death devastates William when he learns she had pressured him into becoming an undertaker under false pretenses. William tells Mary that he loves her, but her response falls short. Rick breaks the news to Mary that he's dating her mother.
6	6	Stuart Orme	Mick Ford	27 April 2003	9.56
Mary’s ex, Reuben, resurfaces, throwing William and Mary’s relationship into turmoil. As Kate and Brendan pursue clandestine sexual experimentation, Brendan overhears Reuben offering to disappear for cash. Overcome with jealousy and freed from his family obligation to be an undertaker, William decides not only to break it off with Mary, but sell the business and leave the country. When Mary discovers this, she declares her love for William and asks him to marry her; insisting that he remain an undertaker.

=== Series 2 (2004) ===
No. overall	No. in series	Directed by	Written by	Original release date	Viewers (millions)
7	1	Matthew Evans	Mick Ford	7 March 2004	9.06
Mary has persuaded William to remain an undertaker and to keep his business, but William’s cousin and solicitor Nicholas arrives to inform him it’s too late, it’s gone. He will have to start over. Now that William and Mary are engaged, to Mary’s dismay, Rick and Molly announce their engagement.
8	2	Matthew Evans	Mick Ford	14 March 2004	8.48
With the name Shawcross and Sons sold with the business, Arnold and Jane become William’s new partners and supply the new name as well; McKinnon and Spalding. Mary learns she is pregnant. William holds a traditional Chinese funeral while Mary tends to a couple enduring a stillborn birth. William surprises Mary with a fixer upper that will accommodate their combined families.
9	3	Nick Laughland	Mick Ford	21 March 2004	8.18
Mary considers becoming an independent midwife, taking the head of the firm as her latest client. William’s clients put him, Arnold and Jane between two violent feuding families, and they take refuge in Mary’s old flat. William plays for an Elvis night. Julia fears she’s losing her family. Kate loses her virginity to a married man.
10	4	Nick Laughland	Mick Ford	28 March 2004	8.04
Mary’s snooty private clients help seal her doubts about becoming an independent midwife. William struggles to get Reuben out of his life. Construction at the fixer upper reveals it to be unstable and may have to be condemned. William and Mary schedule dinner with Nicholas to discuss whether their potential loss is insured. As they press Nicholas for a straight answer, Nicholas equivocates, and suddenly dies.
12	5	Coky Giedroyc	Mick Ford	4 April 2004	8.54
William conducts a funeral for a man whose wife didn’t know he wore dresses, and it falls to him to inform her when he worries the conservative woman will find out when his dress wearing friends show up at the funeral. A former client of Mary’s takes her own life along with those of her three children. Featuring: Emma Handy as Tracy Mellor and Jeff Rawle as George Emerson.
12	6	Coky Giedroyc	Mick Ford	11 April 2004	8.40
Molly invites Mary’s father, Ally, to William’s and Mary’s wedding, but changes her mind when he falls “off the wagon”. Rick struggles to keep a determined Ally away. Just when everything appears settled, Reuben brings the vows to an abrupt halt, claiming she is still married to him. Mary flees, then goes into labor in London while William searches for her in Paris. He arrives back in London just as their baby is born. Featuring: Maurice Roëves as Ally.

=== Series 3 (2005) ===
No. overall	No. in series	Directed by	Written by	Original release date	Viewers (millions)
13	1	Matthew Evans	Mick Ford	17 April 2005	7.61
Baby Thomas is now a toddler. Molly is diagnosed with non-Hodgkin’s lymphoma. William steps in to perform the service for a vicar's daughter when the vicar is unable to complete it. Mary and Doris run interference for a blind couple set on a home birth.
14	2	Matthew Evans	Mick Ford	24 April 2005	7.42
William and Mary meet Kate at Oxford, where Kate hopes to be accepted. Terence gets involved in gang graffiti. Molly grows fascinated with entering contests. Doris begins dating Eamon.
15	3	Hettie Macdonald	Mick Ford	1 May 2005	6.19
Billy and Eamon come to blows at William and Mary's dinner party. Mary and Doris attend to a difficult birth, while William sorts out a missing body with Nicholas’s ex, also a solicitor who has taken over Nicholas’s practice. The new father aggressively propositions Mary, while Nicholas’s ex does likewise with William.
16	4	Hettie Macdonald	Mick Ford	8 May 2005	6.31
William and Rick are asked to celebrate a biker's funeral by putting him on a high speed bike run. When Terence is viciously slashed by gang members, William and Reuben decide he should go to stay with Reuben until things calm down. Mary is furious and turns cold towards William. Featured music: Catch a Falling Star
17	5	Sandy Johnson	Mick Ford	15 May 2005	6.65
Molly and Rick squabble over how to cope with her cancer battle. William arranges a service for a man lost at sea. Mary remains frosty towards William and begins to fantasize about a handsome client, a doctor, and her ex.
18	6	Sandy Johnson	Mick Ford	22 May 2005	7.51
Jane threatens to leave the firm as she finds Arnold's relationship with Mrs Ball difficult to cope with. The twin brother of William’s latest client puts a fright into staff by showing up unexpectedly at McKinnon & Spalding. William hits on a plan to get Terence back … a new home in another neighborhood. Molly wins a prize contest. After a grueling course of cancer treatment, Molly is finally given the all clear, prompting her to spend her prize winnings on travel for the grandkids and a party. At the celebration, William and Mary flirt with another attempt at marriage, but ultimately decide they’re happy with their lives just the way they are.

== Reception ==
=== Ratings ===
Series	Episode	Air date	Viewers	Rank	Ref(s)
Series 1	1	23 March 2003	8,620,000	13	
Series 1	2	30 March 2003	8,590,000	14	
Series 1	3	6 April 2003	7,950,000	14	
Series 1	4	13 April 2003	8,010,000	15	
Series 1	5	20 April 2003	7,500,000	15	
Series 1	6	27 April 2003	9,560,000	9	
Series 2	1	7 March 2004	9,060,000	13	
Series 2	2	14 March 2004	8,479,000	16	
Series 2	3	21 March 2004	8,184,000	15	
Series 2	4	28 March 2004	8,042,000	14	
Series 2	5	4 April 2004	8,544,000	12	
Series 2	6	11 April 2004	8,400,000	11	
Series 3	1	17 April 2005	7,609,000	13	
Series 3	2	24 April 2005	7,422,000	15	
Series 3	3	1 May 2005	6,194,000	16	
Series 3	4	8 May 2005	6,311,000	16	
Series 3	5	15 May 2005	6,650,000	14	
Series 3	6	22 May 2005	7,505,000	13	

=== Awards and nominations ===
- BAFTA Awards

2004 Nominated, BAFTA TV Award Best Drama Series Trevor Hopkins, Stuart Orme, Mick Ford

- British Comedy Awards

2003 Nominated, British Comedy Award Best TV Comedy Actor Martin Clunes Also for The Booze Cruise.

- National Television Awards, UK

2005 Nominated, National Television Award Most Popular Actor Martin Clunes Also for Doc Martin

2003 Nominated, National Television Award Most Popular Actor Martin Clunes

== DVD releases ==
William and Mary has been released in its entirety on DVD in individual and complete sets. In the United States and Canada (Region 1), the series was never released in any singular series sets, however it was released in a set comprising the first two series, via Image Entertainment, before a complete collection set was made available from Acorn Media. In the UK (Region 2), it was initially released by VCI (Video Collection International) for its first series, before going out-of-print, and the rights were subsequently acquired by ITV DVD who re-released the first series, alongside the debut release of the second series in both individual sets and a collected box set. This was followed by the release of the third series and the complete series the following month. In Australia and New Zealand (Region 4), distribution rights were initially held by Shock Records, who released all three series individually and in a complete collection set. All series, including the complete series box set, was later made available by Roadshow Entertainment. As of 2024, distribution rights are held by Madman Entertainment, who have re-released the complete series set, but no individual sets.

Series	Release date		
Series	Region 1	Region 2	Region 4
Series 1	—N/a	15 March 2004	3 December 2007
Series 2	—N/a	9 May 2005	1 March 2008
Series 1 & 2	17 July 2007	9 May 2005	—N/a
Series 3	—N/a	6 June 2005	31 May 2008
Series 1–3	25 March 2014	6 June 2005	25 September 2009
Series 1 (re-release)	—N/a	9 May 2005	30 January 2013
Series 2 (re-release)	—N/a	—N/a	30 January 2013
Series 3 (re-release)	—N/a	—N/a	6 March 2013
Series 1–3 (re-release)	—N/a	—N/a	3 April 2013; 3 January 2024
