= Louise Malloy =

American journalist and social activist (1858–1947)

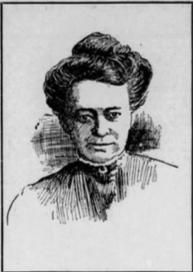
- Born: December 12, 1858; Baltimore
- Died: February 25, 1947; Baltimore
- Occupations: Journalist, playwright, social activist, poet, humorist
- Employer: Baltimore American

Louise Malloy (December 12, 1858 – February 25, 1947) was an American journalist, writer and social activist. She was probably the first woman to work as a newspaper journalist in Baltimore, Maryland, and spent three decades writing for the Baltimore American. She also became a playwright and two of her plays were performed on Broadway.

== Early life ==
She was born Maria Louisa Malloy on December 12, 1858, in Baltimore, Maryland, the eldest of three children of John and Frances (Fannie) Sollers Malloy. She attended the Baltimore Academy of the Visitation, a Catholic school, and was a devout Catholic her entire life.

== Baltimore American ==
In 1886, a family friend, theatre manager John T. Ford (of Ford's Theatre fame) persuaded American publisher Felix Angus to hire Malloy. Angus gave Malloy a test of the type often used to weed out women applicants for journalism work: go to a busy Baltimore street and write about what she saw, who no further specific instructions. Despairing what to write about, Malloy recalled an incident that became the centerpiece of her story.

...she had seen a woman, in her eagerness to cross a crowded thoroughfare, walk straight through the procession of wagons and cars, looking neither of the right nor the left, and walk to the opposite side of the street. Every vehicle had stopped to allow the woman to pass unheeding and to all appearances unheeded.

Apparently she passed the test, as Angus told her to "look around and make a place for yourself". She promptly created a woman's department at the American called "Facts and Fancies". She started a humor column, "Notes and Notions", under the penname Josh Wink at a time when few women were humorists. She scored a number of high-profile interviews, including First Lady of Maryland Mary Ridgely Preston Brown and Baltimore mayor E. Clay Timanus. She also became the paper's drama critic. Producer David Belasco called Malloy "the greatest dramatic critic of her day upon whose every word we hung. Opening in Baltimore and rating her praise we inevitably went on to Broadway success."

Malloy also wrote editorials for the American advocating for the reform of the Baltimore City Fire Department and the juvenile justice system. She advocated for increasing the size of fire department and purchasing new firefighting equipment, and her interest intensified after the devastating Great Baltimore Fire of 1904. She also wrote extensively against the practice of imprisoning children and is credited with generating support for the establishment of Baltimore's juvenile court system. She often wrote about Catholic faith. In 1920, she attended the canonization of Joan of Arc in Rome. She wrote a pamphlet titled The Life Story of Mother Seton (1924), in which she hoped that Elizabeth Ann Seaton would become the first American-born Catholic saint. (She did; Seaton was canonized in 1975.)

Malloy was a founding member of the Women's Literary Club of Baltimore in 1890. She was president of the Baltimore branch of the National League of American Pen Women from 1926 to 1928.

Following her retirement from the American, she continued to write as a freelance journalist and playwright. She also wrote more than two dozen short stories, all apparently unpublished, wrote a song that was performed on the radio, and taught English at Calvert Business College.

== Drama ==
Malloy's first play was staged in Baltimore in 1894. She wrote at least fifteen works for the stage.

She wrote the plays The Woman at War with Felix Angus and The Ragged Cavalier with Creston Clarke. She also wrote The Free Willer, about indentured servants.

Her plays The Player's Maid and The Boy Lincoln (1940) were both staged on Broadway.

== Death ==
Louise Malloy died on February 25, 1947, in Baltimore.
