= Woman's Literary Club of Baltimore =

Women's club in Maryland (1890–1941)

- Parole Féminine (English: Women's speech)

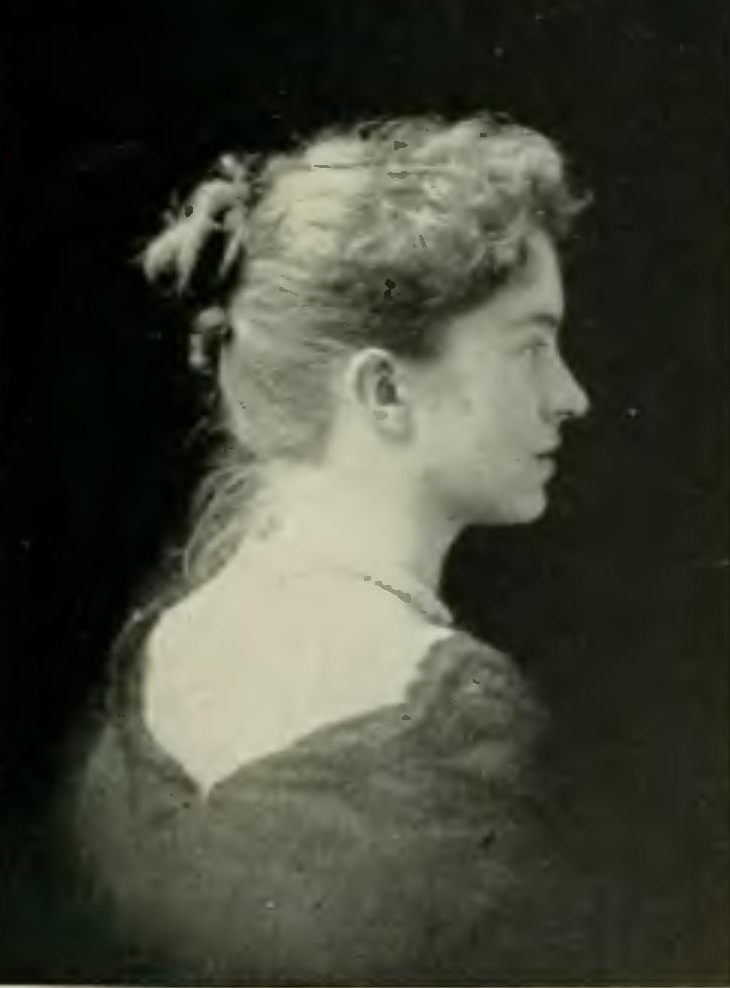
- Hester Crawford Dorsey Richardson, founding member of the Woman's Literary Club of Baltimore, c. 1892.

The Woman’s Literary Club of Baltimore (1890–1941) grew out of the tradition of women’s clubs that flourished in late nineteenth-century America. A number of literary societies founded throughout the country during this time provided women a chance to read and discuss literature in a supportive setting. These clubs originated to fill a void left by the limited educational opportunities for girls. The Women's Literary Club of Baltimore differed from the majority of women's clubs, however, in focusing on getting their work published. The group provided mutual support for one another, not just in their study of literature but to support each other’s efforts in pursuing literary careers. Over the course of its existence, hundreds of works by Club members were published in magazines, newspapers, and by major book publishers.

The Woman’s Literary Club of Baltimore was founded in March 1890, and was the idea of two young writers, Louisa C.Osburne Haughton and Hester Crawford Dorsey, who issued an invitation to discuss founding a club “to further greater intellectual development of the women of Baltimore and to promote social relations among those of similar tastes.” Nearly 40 women responded. One of the first orders of business at the initial meeting was the selection of a name. The inclusion of Woman in the club’s title was significant. Not only did it identify the membership; it also announced the belief that women writers were different from their male counterparts. Club members took as their motto “Parole Femine” (womanly words), a phrase from the Maryland state motto. They believed that women writers brought a different sensibility to their work and could raise the standards of literature.

The club founders were serious in purpose and set out a formal structure through which to achieve their goals. Their Constitution enumerated the duties and responsibilities of officers and members. The club was run by elected officers, who formed the club's board of managers. Membership in the club was limited at first to women “who had a sufficient interest in literature to have devoted some time and thought to original work for either newspapers or magazines or of a more lasting nature”; all eleven of the club’s founding members were published authors. The requirement that members be published authors eventually eased, and women interested in literary pursuits were offered membership. At its 30th anniversary, it was noted that the club had been eager to recognize and foster young talent. Publication, however, remained an important goal for the club, and the president’s remarks often praised the publication successes of its members. Some of the best-known writers affiliated with the club included Lizette Woodworth Reese, Margaret Sutton Briscoe, Louise Malloy, and Harriet Lummis Smith.

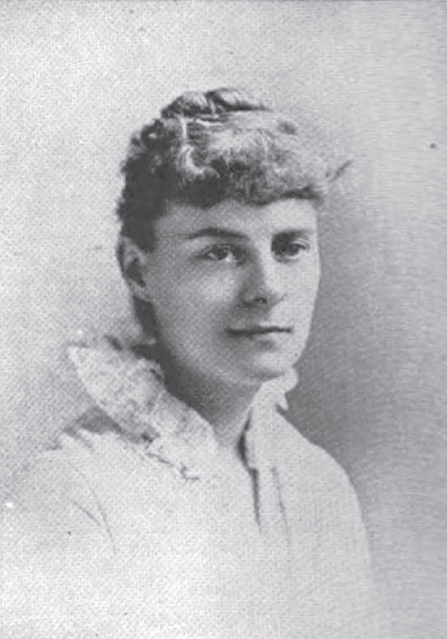
Lizette Woodworth Reese, founding member of the Woman's Literary Club of Baltimore. American Women: Fifteen Hundred Biographies Vol II (1897), ed. Frances E. Willard.

The club met weekly, on Tuesday afternoons, between October and the first week in June, leaving the summer months free for members to escape the city heat in travel or stays at summer homes. The club never owned a clubhouse, as was common for clubs at this time. They remained a fairly small group, capping their membership at 100, and while this allowed them funds for their activities, it would not support the purchase and maintenance of a building. Instead, the group affiliated with the Maryland Academy of Sciences in 1891 as associate members, and were allowed to establish their meeting room in the academy’s building. The academy moved several times in the club’s early years, but when they finally moved to 105 West Franklin Street, the former mansion of Maryland governor Thomas Swann, the club was provided with a comfortable meeting space until 1921, when they began meeting in a room at the Arundell Club at 1000 N. Charles Street.

The heart of the Woman’s Literary Club of Baltimore was its committees, where the members tested their literary works to be presented at the weekly meetings. Each member was required to belong to at least one committee, but it was recommended they not belong to more than two so as to have time to give adequate attention to the committee work. The committee chair selected the topics and organized the discussions, debates and critical analysis of members’ work. The committee setting was where the members presented their work and received, as one member put it, “a baptism of friendly criticism.” In committee sessions some members shared poems, short stories, book chapters, translations, or an act from a play. Others wrote papers on artistic movements, music and musicians, or historical events. After thorough vetting by the committee, papers deemed ready for wider hearing were selected by the committee chair and presented at a weekly meeting of the club. The committees, and their plans of work, varied from year to year depending on the chair. The committees that presented programs to the club most often were those dealing with literature: Fiction, Modern Poetry, Drama, Essays, Current Criticism and Translation. Three long-standing committees were Art, Music, and Education. American history was of great interest to the members, supporting committees in Colonial and Revolutionary History, Letters and Autographs, and “Unfamiliar Records.” Archaeology, the specialty of longtime Club president Letitia Yonge Wrenshall, was a long-standing committee.

In addition to weekly meetings, the Woman's Literary Club of Baltimore held salons, which were social events with a musical program and refreshments. Members were permitted to invite guests, male or female, to attend. The Home Committee was in charge of decorating the rooms and providing the refreshments. To provide inspiration for members, the club maintained a library of books written by themselves as well as their fellow Maryland authors.

Each January beginning in 1902, the club held an annual Twelfth Night Celebration, an elaborate dinner with a musical program and a Christmas cake baked with souvenirs that was paraded through the gathering. On All Souls’ Day, November 2, the club members decorated the graves of authors and artists buried in Maryland. Among those honored were Edgar Allan Poe, Junius Brutus Booth, John Pendleton Kennedy, Sidney Lanier, Col. Richard Malcolm Johnston, William H. Rinehart, and former Club member Mary Spear Tiernan. In 1907, members of the WLCB organized the Edgar Allan Poe Memorial Association in advance of the centennial of his birth in 1909.

The Club did not admit black members, though at least one Jewish woman belonged (Henrietta Szold, who later founded the Zionist women's organization Hadassah); and while some of its members strongly supported suffrage, no mention of the club's participation in suffrage activities is recorded.

The Woman’s Literary Club of Baltimore completed its final season in May 1941. Louisa C. Osburne Haughton, one of the originators of the club, served as president for its final 23 years. Notices of meetings and events published in the Baltimore Sun indicate that the club stayed true to its mission of supporting women writers and their literary pursuits.
