= Eleanor H. Porter =

American novelist known for writing Pollyanna and Just David

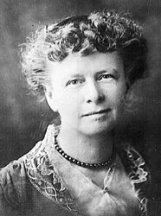
- Porter, c. 1890–1900
- Born: Eleanor Emily Hodgman; December 19, 1868 Littleton, New Hampshire, U.S.
- Died: May 21, 1920 (aged 51) Cambridge, Massachusetts, U.S.
- Occupation: Novelist
- Years active: 1901–1920
- Notable works: Pollyanna (1913)
- Spouse: John Lyman Porter (m. 1892)

Eleanor Emily Hodgman Porter (December 19, 1868 – May 21, 1920) was an American novelist. She was best known as the creator of the Pollyanna series of books, starting with Pollyanna (1913), which were a popular phenomenon.

== Biography ==
Eleanor Emily Hodgman was born in Littleton, New Hampshire, on December 19, 1868, the daughter of Llewella French (née Woolson) and Francis Fletcher Hodgman. She was trained as a singer, attending the New England Conservatory for several years. In 1892 she married John Lyman Porter and relocated to Massachusetts, after which she began writing and publishing her short stories and, later, novels. She died at her home in Cambridge, Massachusetts, on May 21, 1920, and was buried at Mount Auburn Cemetery.

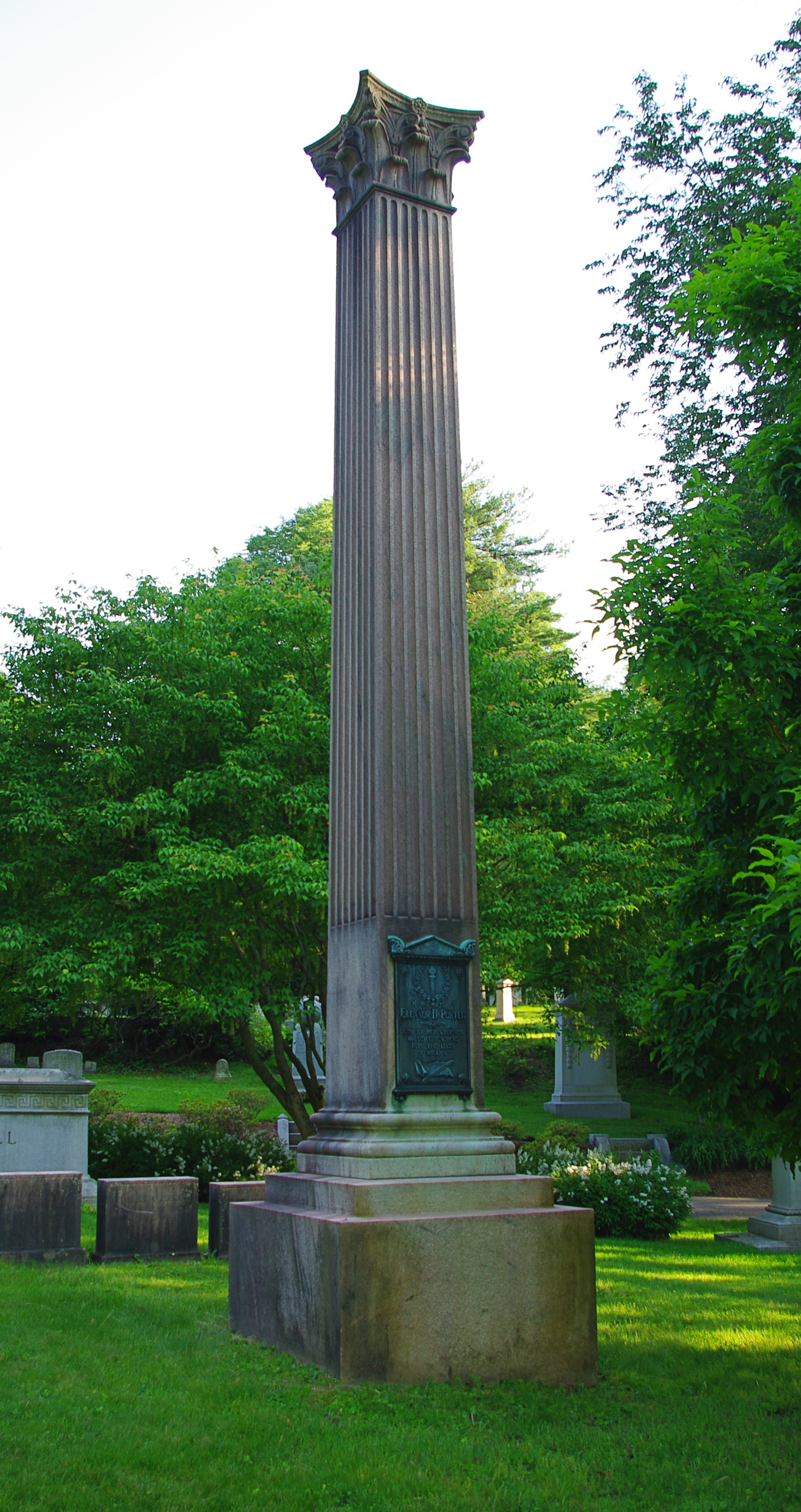
Grave of Eleanor H. Porter, Mount Auburn Cemetery

== Works ==
Porter wrote mainly children's literature, adventure stories, and romance fiction. Her most famous novel is Pollyanna (1913), followed by a sequel, Pollyanna Grows Up (1915).

Her adult novels include The Turn of the Tide (1908), The Road to Understanding (1917), Oh Money! Money! (1918), Dawn (1919), Keith's Dark Tower (1919), Mary Marie (1920) and Sister Sue (1921); her short-story collections include Across the Years (c. 1919), Money, Love and Kate (1923), and Little Pardner (1926).

Porter achieved considerable commercial success: Pollyanna ranked eighth among best-selling novels in the United States during 1913, second during 1914, and fourth during 1915 (with 47 printings between 1915 and 1920); Just David ranked third in 1916; The Road to Understanding ranked fourth in 1917; and Oh Money! Money! ranked fifth in 1918.

== Bibliography ==
=== Short stories ===
- A Delayed Heritage
- A Four-Footed Faith and a Two
- A Matter of System
- A Mushroom of Collingsville
- A Patron of Art
- Angelus
- Crumbs
- Millionaire Mike's Thanksgiving
- That Angel Boy
- The Apple of Her Eye
- The Daltons and the Legacy
- The Elephant's Board and Keep
- The Folly of Wisdom
- The Glory and the Sacrifice
- The Indivisible Five
- The Lady in Black
- The Letter
- The Saving of Dad
- When Mother Fell Ill
- When Polly Ann Played Santa Claus
- Women in Black

=== Novels ===
- Cross Currents (1907)
- The Turn of the Tide (1908)
- The Story of Marco (1911)
- Miss Billy (1911)
- Miss Billy's Decision (1912)
- Pollyanna (1913)
- The Sunbridge Girls at Six Star Ranch (1913)
- Miss Billy Married (1914)
- Pollyanna Grows Up (1915)
- Just David (1916)
- The Road to Understanding (1917)
- Oh, Money! Money! (1918)
- The Tangled Threads (1919)
- Dawn (1919)
- Mary Marie (1920)
