= 1900s =

Decade of the Gregorian calendar (1900–1909)

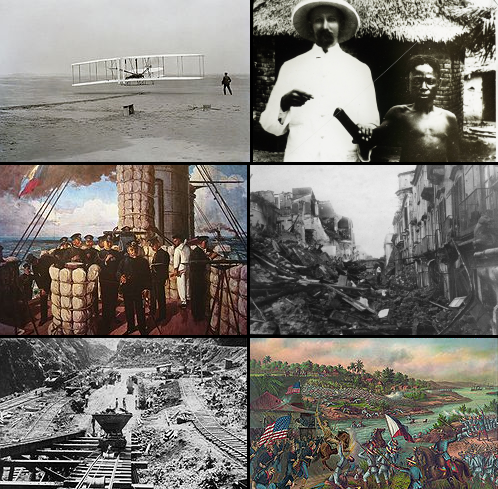
From left, clockwise: The Wright brothers achieve the first manned flight with a motorized airplane, in Kitty Hawk in 1903; A missionary points to the severed hand of a Congolese villager, symbolic of Belgian atrocities in the Congo Free State, which ended in 1908; The 1908 Messina earthquake kills 75,000–82,000 people and becomes the most destructive earthquake ever to strike Europe; The United States gains control over the Philippines in 1902, after the Philippine–American War; Rock being moved to construct the Panama Canal in 1907; Admiral Togo before the Battle of Tsushima in 1905, part of the Russo-Japanese War, leading to Japanese victory and their establishment as a great power, while Russia's defeat eventually led to the 1905 Revolution.

The 1900s (pronounced "nineteen-hundreds") was the decade that began on January 1, 1900, and ended on December 31, 1909. The Edwardian era (1901–1910) covers a similar span of time. The term "nineteen-hundreds" is sometimes also used to mean the entire century from January 1, 1900, to December 31, 1999 (the years beginning with "19").

The Scramble for Africa continued, with the Orange Free State, South African Republic, Ashanti Empire, Aro Confederacy, Sokoto Caliphate and Kano Emirate being conquered by the British Empire, alongside the French Empire conquering Borno, the German Empire conquering the Adamawa Emirate, and the Portuguese Empire conquering the Ovambo. Atrocities in the Congo Free State were committed by private companies and the Force Publique, with a resultant population decline (Note: "I suggest that it is impossible to separate deaths caused by massacre and starvation from those due to the pandemic of sleeping sickness (trypanosomiasis) which decimated central Africa at the time." - Neal Ascherson (1999)) of 1 to 15 million. From 1904 to 1908, German colonial forces in South West Africa led a campaign of ethnic extermination and collective punishment, killing 24,000 to 100,000 Hereros and 10,000 Nama. The First Moroccan and Bosnian crises led to worsened tensions in Europe that would ultimately lead to World War I in the next decade. Cuba, Bulgaria, and Norway became independent.

The deadliest conventional war of this decade was the Russo-Japanese War, fought over rival imperial ambitions in Manchuria and the Korean Empire. Russia suffered a humiliating defeat in this conflict, contributing to a growing domestic unrest which culminated in the Russian Revolution of 1905. Unconventional wars of similar scale include insurrections in the Philippines (1899–1913), China (1899–1901), and Colombia (1899–1902). Lesser conflicts include interstate wars such as the Second Boer War (1899–1902), the Kuwaiti–Rashidi war (1900–1901), and the Saudi–Rashidi War (1903–1907), as well as failed uprisings and revolutions in Portuguese Angola (1902–1904), Rumelia (1903), Ottoman Eastern Anatolia (1904), Uruguay (1904), French Madagascar (1905–1906), Argentina (1905), Persia (1905–1911), German East Africa (1905–1907), and Romania (1907). A major famine took place in China from 1906 to 1907, possibly leading to 20–25 million deaths. This famine was directly caused by the 1906 China floods (April–October 1906), which hit the Huai River particularly hard and destroyed both the summer and autumn harvest. The 1908 Messina earthquake caused 75,000–82,000 deaths.

First-wave feminism made advances, with universities being opened for women in Japan, Bulgaria, Cuba, Russia, and Peru. In 1906, Finland granted women the right to vote, the first European country to do so. The foundation of the Women's Social and Political Union by Emmeline Pankhurst in 1903 led to the rise of the Suffragettes in Great Britain and Ireland. In 1908, a revolution took place in the Ottoman Empire, where the Young Turks movement restored the Ottoman constitution of 1876, establishing the Second Constitutional Era. Subsequently, ethnic tensions rose, and in 1909, up to 30,000 mainly Armenian civilians in Adana were slain by Turkish civilians.

The decade saw the widespread application of the internal combustion engine including mass production of the automobile, as well as the introduction of the typewriter. The Wright Flyer performed the first recorded controlled, powered, sustained heavier than air flight on December 17, 1903. Reginald Fessenden of East Bolton, Quebec, Canada made what appeared to be the first audio radio broadcasts of entertainment and music ever made to a general audience. The first huge success of American cinema, as well as the largest experimental achievement to this point, was the 1903 film The Great Train Robbery, directed by Edwin S. Porter, while the world's first feature film, The Story of the Kelly Gang, was released on December 26, 1906, in Melbourne, Australia. Popular books of this decade included The Tale of Peter Rabbit (1902) and Anne of Green Gables (1908), which sold 45 million and 50 million copies respectively. Popular songs of this decade include "Lift Every Voice and Sing" and "What Are They Doing in Heaven?", which have been featured in 42 and 16 hymnals respectively.

During the decade, the world population increased from 1.60 to 1.75 billion, with approximately 580 million births and 450 million deaths in total. As of November 2026, the only remaining living person born in this decade is Ethel Caterham, born August 21, 1909. The last living man from this decade was Juan Vicente Pérez (May 27, 1909 – April 2, 2024).

== Pronunciation varieties ==
There are several main varieties of how individual years of the decade are pronounced. Using 1906 as an example, they are "nineteen-oh-six", "nineteen-six", and "nineteen-aught-six". Which variety is most prominent depends somewhat on global region and generation. "Nineteen-oh-six" is the most common; "nineteen-six" is less common. In American English, "nineteen-aught-six" is also recognized but not much used.

== Demographics ==
Estimates for the world population by 1900 vary from 1.563 to 1.710 billion.

| PRB (1973–2016) | UN (2015) | Maddison (2008) | HYDE (2010) | Tanton (1994) | Biraben (1980) | McEvedy & Jones (1978) | Thomlinson (1975) | Durand (1974) | Clark (1967) |
|---|---|---|---|---|---|---|---|---|---|
| 1,656M | 1,650M | 1,563M | 1,654M | 1,600M | 1,633M | 1,625M | 1,600M | 1,650–1,710M | 1,668M |

== Politics and wars ==
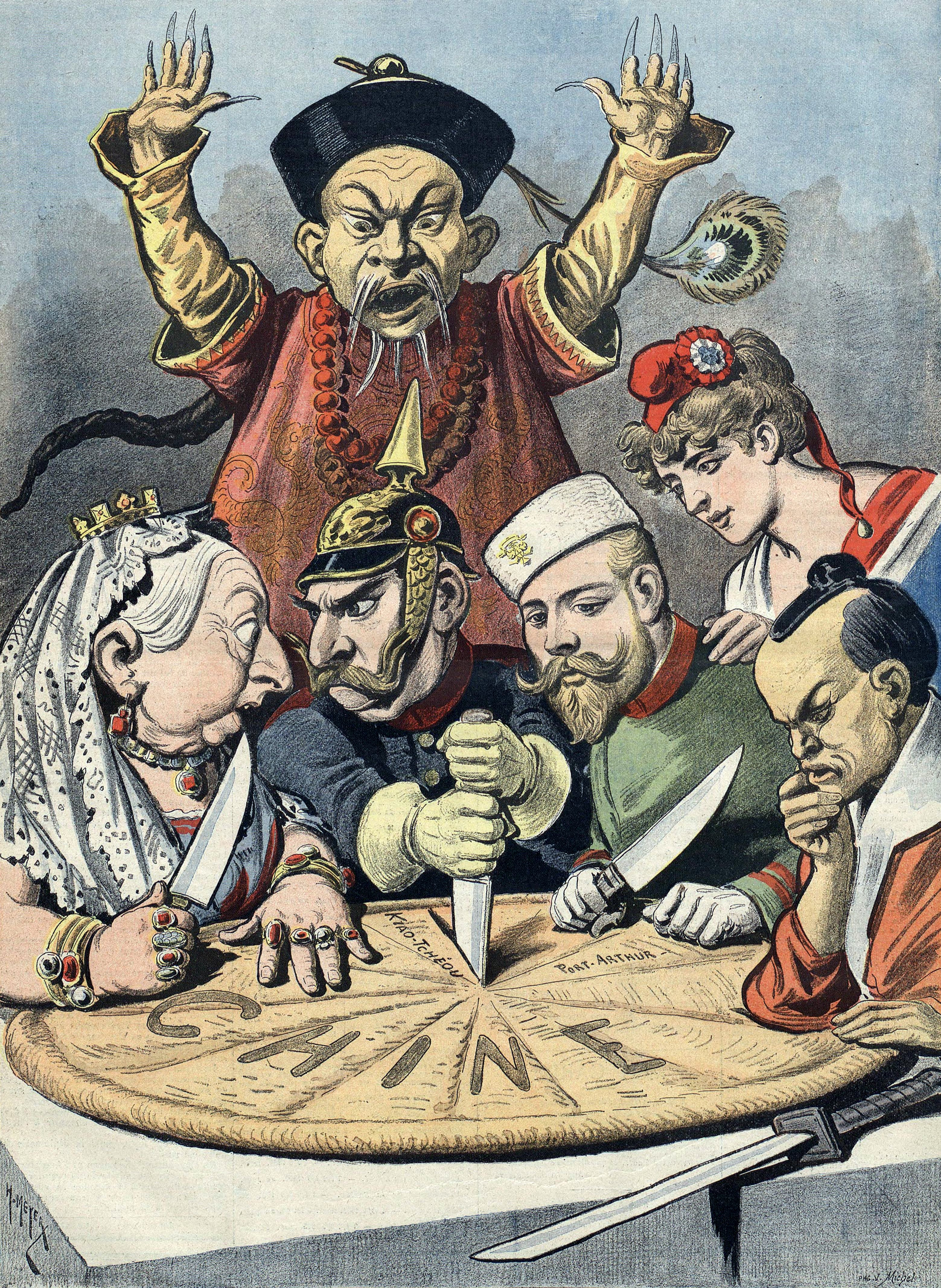
A shocked mandarin in Manchu robe in the back, with Queen Victoria (British Empire), Wilhelm II (German Empire), Nicholas II (Imperial Russia), Marianne (French Third Republic), and a samurai (Empire of Japan) stabbing into a king cake with Chine ("China" in French) written on it. A portrayal of New Imperialism and its effects on China.

=== Major political changes ===
- New Imperialism
- The United Kingdom of Great Britain and Ireland and the French Third Republic sign Entente Cordiale

=== Wars ===
- Second Boer War ends.
- Philippine–American War takes place (1899–1902).
- The Kuwaiti–Rashidi war takes place (1900–1901).
- Battle of Riyadh was a minor battle of the Unification of Saudi Arabia (1902).
- Russo-Japanese War establishes the Empire of Japan as a world power (1904–1905).
- The Ottomans invade Persia and capture a strip of territory (1906).
- Battle of Dilam was a major battle of the Unification War between Rashidi and Saudi rebels (1903–1907).
- First Saudi–Rashidi War was engaged between the Saudi loyal forces of the newborn Emirate of Riyadh versus the Emirate of Ha'il (1903–1907).

=== Internal conflicts ===
- The Boxer Rebellion ends.
- The Russian Revolution of 1905.
- The Mesopotamia uprising of 1906.
- Demand for Home Rule for Ireland.
- Herero and Namaqua genocide in German South-West Africa (modern Namibia).
- Kurdish uprising in Bitlis against the Ottoman Empire in 1907.

=== Colonization ===
- January 1, 1901, British colonies in Australia federate, forming the Commonwealth of Australia.

=== Decolonization ===
- May 20, 1902 – Cuba gains independence from the United States
- June 7, 1905 – The Norwegian Parliament declares the union with Sweden dissolved, and Norway achieves full independence.
- October 5, 1908 – Bulgaria declares its independence from the Ottoman Empire.

=== Prominent political events ===
- January 22, 1901, the death of Queen Victoria.
- August 9, 1902, the coronation of Edward VII and Alexandra, as king and queen of the United Kingdom and the British Dominions.

== Disasters ==
=== Natural disasters ===
June 30, 1908: The Tunguska event

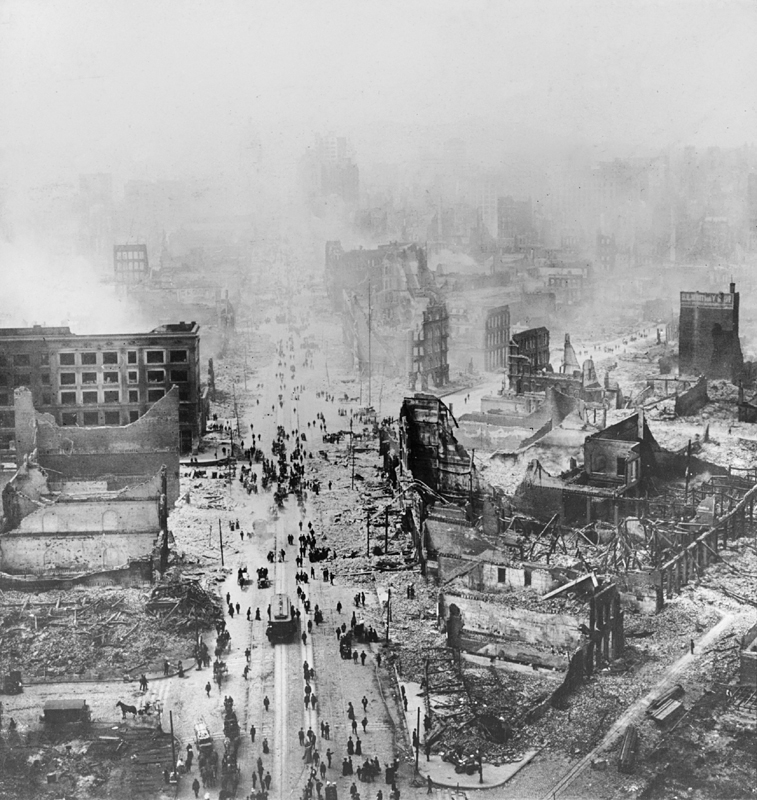
Ruins from the 1906 San Francisco earthquake, remembered as one of the worst natural disasters in United States history

- August 7, 1900 – A 40-foot-tall tornado struck New Rochelle, New York, US, killing an unknown number of people.
- September 8, 1900 – A powerful hurricane hits Galveston, Texas, US, killing about 8,000.
- April 19, 1902 – A magnitude 7.5 earthquake rocks Guatemala, killing 2,000.
- May 8, 1902 – In Martinique, Mount Pelée erupts, destroying the town of Saint-Pierre and killing over 30,000.
- October 24–25, 1902 – The Santa María volcano erupts in Guatemala, one of the three largest eruptions of the 20th century, killing an estimated 6,000 people.
- December 25, 1902 – A large hurricane struck the countries of Sweden and Denmark, leading to the deaths of 50 people.
- February 26–27, 1903 – A large extratropical cyclone known as Storm Ulysses swept through the British Isles and led to the deaths of 30 people.
- April 7, 1906 – Mount Vesuvius erupts and devastates Naples.
- April 18, 1906 – The 1906 San Francisco earthquake (estimated magnitude 7.8) on the San Andreas Fault destroys much of San Francisco, US, killing at least 3,000, with 225,000–300,000 left homeless, and $350 million in damages.
- September 18, 1906 – A typhoon and tsunami kill an estimated 10,000 in Hong Kong.
- January 14, 1907 – An earthquake in Kingston, Jamaica kills more than 1,000.
- June 30, 1908 – The Tunguska event or "Russian explosion" near the Podkamennaya Tunguska River in Krasnoyarsk Krai, Siberia, Russian Empire occurs resulting in the flattening 2,000 km^{2} (770 sq mi) of forest. It is believed to have been caused by the air burst of a large meteoroid or comet fragment, at an altitude of 5–10 kilometres (3–6 mi) above the Earth's surface.
- December 28, 1908 – An earthquake and tsunami destroys Messina, Sicily and Calabria, killing over 80,000 people.

=== Non-natural disasters ===
- April 26, 1900 – The Great Lumber Fire of Ottawa–Hull kills 7 and leaves 15,000 homeless.
- May 1, 1900 – The Scofield Mine disaster in Scofield, Utah, caused by explosion killing at least 200 men.
- June 30, 1900 – Hoboken Docks Fire: The German passenger ships Saale, Main, Bremen, and Kaiser William der Grosse, all owned by the North German Lloyd Steamship line, catch fire at the docks in Hoboken, New Jersey, US. The fire began on a wharf and spread to the adjacent piers, warehouses, and smaller craft, killing 326 people.
- May 3, 1901 – The Great Fire of 1901 begins in Jacksonville, Florida, US.
- July 10, 1902 – The Rolling Mill Mine disaster in Johnstown, Pennsylvania, US, kills 112 miners.
- August 10, 1903 – Paris Métro train fire.
- December 30, 1903 – A fire at the Iroquois Theater in Chicago, US, kills 600.
- February 7, 1904 – The Great Baltimore Fire in Baltimore, US, destroys over 1,500 buildings in 30 hours.
- June 15, 1904 – A fire aboard the steamboat General Slocum in New York City's East River kills 1,021.
- June 28, 1904 – The Danish ocean liner SS Norge runs aground and sinks close to Rockall, killing 635, including 225 Norwegian emigrants.
- January 22, 1906 – The SS Valencia strikes a reef off Vancouver Island, Canada, killing over 100 (officially 136) in the ensuing disaster.

== Assassinations and attempts ==
Prominent assassinations, targeted killings, and assassination attempts include:

| Year | Date | Name | Position | Culprits | Country | Description | Image |
|---|---|---|---|---|---|---|---|
| 1900 | February 3 | William Goebel | governor of Kentucky | unknown | United States | Either five or six shots were fired from the nearby State Building, one striking Goebel in the chest, seriously wounding him. | |
| 1900 | July 29 | Umberto I | King | Gaetano Bresci | Italy | Assassinated by anarchist Gaetano Bresci. | |
| 1901 | March 6 | Wilhelm II | Kaiser | Deidrich Weiland | Germany | Attempted assassination in Bremen by Deidrich Weiland. | |
| 1901 | September 6 | William McKinley | President | Leon Czolgosz | United States | Dies 8 days after being shot at the Pan-American Exposition in Buffalo, New York, by American anarchist Leon Czolgosz. | |
| 1902 | April 15 | Dmitry Sipyagin | Russian Interior Minister | Stepan Balmashov | Russian Empire | Sipyagin was assassinated in the Mariinsky Palace by Socialist-Revolutionary Stepan Balmashov. | |
| 1902 | September 29 | Émile Zola | novelist and journalist | unknown | France | Zola was killed by carbon monoxide poisoning caused by an improperly ventilated chimney. | |
| 1902 | November 4 | Hale Johnson | Mayor of Newton, Illinois | Harry Harris | United States | Hale was Killed while attempting to collect a debt owed to him by Harry Harris who shot him. | |
| 1903 | March 31 | Grigoriy Shcherbina | Russian consul | an unknown Albanian Ottoman officer | Ottoman Empire | According to Durham. A year later, the 35-year-old Consul died of bullet wounds sustained in the assassination attempt by an Albanian soldier. | |
| 1903 | June 11 | Aleksandar Obrenović, and Draga Mašin | King of Serbia, and Queen Consort | Army officers led by Dragutin Dimitrijević | Serbia | Killed in the royal palace as part of the May Overthrow. | |
| 1903 | June 11 | Lazar Petrović | Adjutant to King Aleksandar Obrenović | unknown assassin | Kingdom of Serbia | Killed as part of the May Overthrow. | |
| 1903 | June 11 | Dimitrije Cincar-Marković | Prime Minister of Serbia | rioters from the May Coup | Serbia | Markovic was killed in the May Coup. | |
| 1904 | November 26 | José Francisco Chaves | Superintendent of Public Instruction (former congressman and territory politician) | unknown | United States | Jose was shot by an unknown assassin in Pinoswells, New Mexico. | |
| 1904 | June 16 | Nikolai Bobrikov | Governor-General | Eugen Schauman | Finland | Assassinated by nationalist nobleman Eugen Schauman. | |
| 1904 | July 28 | Vyacheslav von Plehve | Russian Interior Minister | Yegor Sazonov | Russia | Plehve was Killed by a bomb thrown by a member of the SR Combat Organization | |
| 1905 | February 6 | Eliel Soisalon-Soininen | Chancellor of Justice | Lennart Hohenthal | Finland | Assassinated in his apartment in Helsinki by Lennart Hohenthal. | |
| 1905 | February 17 | Grand Duke Sergei Alexandrovich of Russia | Governor-General of Moscow | Ivan Kalyayev | Russian Empire | Alexandrovich was killed in a by a bomb Organized by the SR Combat Organization. | |
| 1905 | April 24 | John McPherson Pinckney | Texas Representative | J. N. Brown | United States | John was Killed during riot instigated by opponents of alcohol prohibition. | |
| 1905 | June 13 | Theodoros Deligiannis | Prime Minister | Antonios Gherakaris | Greece | Killed by gambler Antonios Gherakaris, reportedly for measures taken against gambling places. | |
| 1905 | October 21 | Tomasso Petto | New York mobster | unknown assassin | United States | The New York mobster and leading hitman in the Morello crime family was shot multiple times while walking to his home in Browntown. | |
| 1905 | December 30 | Frank Steunenberg | Governor of Idaho | Harry Orchard | United States | The fourth governor of the State of Idaho was shot by a former miner after Frank left his office. | |
| 1907 | March 8 | Marinos Antypas | socialist politician | Kyriakou | Greece | A group of farmers paid 30,000 drachmas to a supervisor named Kyriakou to kill Antypas, which he did on March 8, 1907. Kyriakou was never convicted for the crime. | |
| 1907 | March 11 | Dimitar Petkov | Prime Minister | Aleksandar Petrov | Bulgaria | Killed by an anarchist. | |
| 1907 | August 31 | Amin al-Soltan | Prime Minister | unknown assassin | Iran | Killed in front of the Parliament. | |
| 1908 | February 1 | Carlos I | King | Alfredo Luís da Costa and Manuel Buíça | Portugal | Assassinated in Lisbon, Portugal. | |
| 1909 | October 26 | Itō Hirobumi | Prime Minister | An Jung-geun | Japan | Also Resident-General of Korea, assassinated by Ahn Jung-geun at the Harbin train station in Manchuria, for many grievances against Japan, including the assassination of Empress Myeongseong of Korea. | |
| 1909 | November 14 | Ramón Lorenzo Falcón | Chief of Police | Simón Radowitzky | Argentina | Falcon was killed when a bomb was planted on his carriage by Simón Radowitzky | |

== Economics ==
- The gold standard was the dominant international monetary system in the 1900s, with all major industrial powers operating under its rules and exchange rates between major currencies remaining fixed.
- Colonial economic relationships significantly shaped global economic patterns, with European powers establishing colonies in Africa, Asia, and the Americas, extracting resources such as cotton, rubber, ivory, gold, and diamonds, and imposing trade policies designed to benefit the colonizers at the expense of the colonized populations.
- The Panic of 1901 was the first New York Stock Exchange stock market crash. The crisis was short-lived but harmed many small American investors.
- Germany's industrial growth was quick during this period. From 1895 to 1907, the number of workers in machine building doubled from slightly more than half a million to well over a million. German steel production, which had exceeded Britain's in 1893, continued to grow, and by the end of the decade Germany dominated all major Continental markets except France.
- Russia experienced rapid economic growth from 1900 to 1905, with the economy expanding at 4 percent annually. However, in 1905, the Russian economy went into a severe slump following an unprecedented wave of worker strikes, peasant protests, and military defeat in the Russo-Japanese War.
- The United Kingdom's economic dominance was increasingly challenged during this decade. While Britain remained the world's largest capital exporter and shipping power, both the United States and Germany surpassed Britain in industrial production, particularly in steel manufacturing.
- The Panic of 1907, also known as the 1907 Bankers' Panic, was a significant financial crisis that occurred in the United States when the stock market fell close to 50% from its peak the previous year. The crisis spread to other countries and was eventually resolved through interventions led by J.P. Morgan.
- France was a major capital exporter during this period, lending substantial portions of GDP to developing economies. The country implemented significant labor reforms, including the introduction of a mandatory weekly rest day in 1906 and the creation of the Ministry of Labour the same year.
- In Japan, the victory in the Russo-Japanese War (1904–1905) accelerated industrial development. Under the leadership of Prime Minister Katsura Tarō, Japan expanded its heavy industry, particularly in shipbuilding and armaments, and strengthened its position as an emerging economic power in Asia. However this growth was coupled with a surge in labour disputes.
- Germany's urbanization accelerated rapidly, with only 40 percent of Germans living in rural areas by 1910, compared to 67 percent at the birth of the empire. Cities of more than 100,000 inhabitants accounted for one-fifth of the population by the end of the decade.
- Italy's economy during this decade was characterized by the growing industrialization in the north, while the southern regions remained predominantly agricultural. Prime Minister Giovanni Giolitti's economic policies encouraged industrial growth, particularly in the automotive and textile sectors.
- Russia's economy began growing again from 1909 following the political and economic crisis of 1905–1907. This recovery continued until the outbreak of World War I, though Russia remained the poorest of the great powers.
- The cost of an American postage stamp was 1 cent in 1909.

== Science and technology ==
=== Science ===
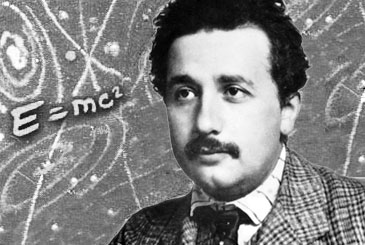
During 1905 the physicist Albert Einstein published four articles – each revolutionary and groundbreaking in its field.

- 1900 – Planck's law of black-body radiation
- 1900 – Quantum Hypothesis by Max Planck
- 1900 – Seismographs built in the University of California, Berkeley
- 1902 – Practical air conditioner designed by Willis Carrier
- March 17, 1905 – Annus Mirabilis papers – Albert Einstein publishes his paper "On a heuristic viewpoint concerning the production and transformation of light", in which he explains the photoelectric effect, using the notion of light quanta. For this paper Einstein received the Nobel Prize for Physics in 1921.
- May 11, 1905 – Annus Mirabilis papers – Albert Einstein submits his doctoral dissertation "On the Motion of Small Particles...", in which he explains Brownian motion.
- June 30, 1905 – Annus Mirabilis papers – Albert Einstein publishes the article "On the Electrodynamics of Moving Bodies", where he reveals his theory of special relativity.
- September 27, 1905 – Annus Mirabilis papers – Albert Einstein submits his paper "Does the Inertia of a Body Depend Upon Its Energy Content?", in which he develops an argument for the equation E = mc^{2}.
- 1908 – the Geiger counter (measures radioactivity) is invented by Hans Geiger
- Pierre and Marie Curie discover the elements radium and polonium, they coin the term radioactivity. In 1901, Harriet Brooks and Ernest Rutherford build on their work and contribute to the discovery of the element radon.
- The Bacillus Calmette-Guérin (BCG) immunization for tuberculosis is first developed.

=== Technology ===
- Widespread application of the internal combustion engine including mass production of the automobile. Rudolf Diesel demonstrated the diesel engine in the 1900 Exposition Universelle (World's Fair) in Paris using peanut oil fuel (see biodiesel). The Diesel engine takes the Grand Prix. The exposition was attended by 50 million people. The same year Wilhelm Maybach designed an engine built at Daimler Motoren Gesellschaft—following the specifications of Emil Jellinek—who required the engine to be named Daimler-Mercedes after his daughter, Mercédès Jellinek. In 1902, the Mercedes 35 hp automobiles with that engine were put into production by DMG.
- Wide popularity of home phonograph. "The market for home machines was created through technological innovation and pricing: Phonographs, gramophones, and graphophones were cleverly adapted to run by spring-motors (you wound them up), rather than by messy batteries or treadle mechanisms, while the musical records were adapted to reproduce loudly through a horn attachment. The cheap home machines sold as the $10 Eagle graphophone and the $40 (later $30) Home phonograph in 1896, the $20 Zon-o-phone in 1898, the $3 Victor Toy in 1900, and so on. Records sold because their fidelity improved, mass production processes were soon developed, advertising worked, and prices dropped from one and two dollars to around 35 cents.". In 1907, a Victor Records recording of Enrico Caruso singing Ruggero Leoncavallo's "Vesti la giubba" becomes the first to sell a million copies.
- 1899–1900 – Thomas Alva Edison of Milan, Ohio, invents the nickel-alkaline storage battery. On May 27, 1901, Edison establishes the Edison Storage Battery Company to develop and manufacture them. "It proved to be Edison's most difficult project, taking ten years to develop a practical alkaline battery. By the time Edison introduced his new alkaline battery, the gasoline powered car had so improved that electric vehicles were becoming increasingly less common, being used mainly as delivery vehicles in cities. However, the Edison alkaline battery proved useful for lighting railway cars and signals, maritime buoys, and miners lamps. Unlike iron ore mining with the Edison Ore-Milling Company, the heavy investment Edison made over ten years was repaid handsomely, and the storage battery eventually became Edison's most profitable product. Further, Edison's work paved the way for the modern alkaline battery."
- 1900 – The Brownie camera is invented; this was the beginning of the Eastman Kodak company. The Brownie popularized low-cost photography and introduced the concept of the snapshot. The first Brownie was introduced in February 1900,

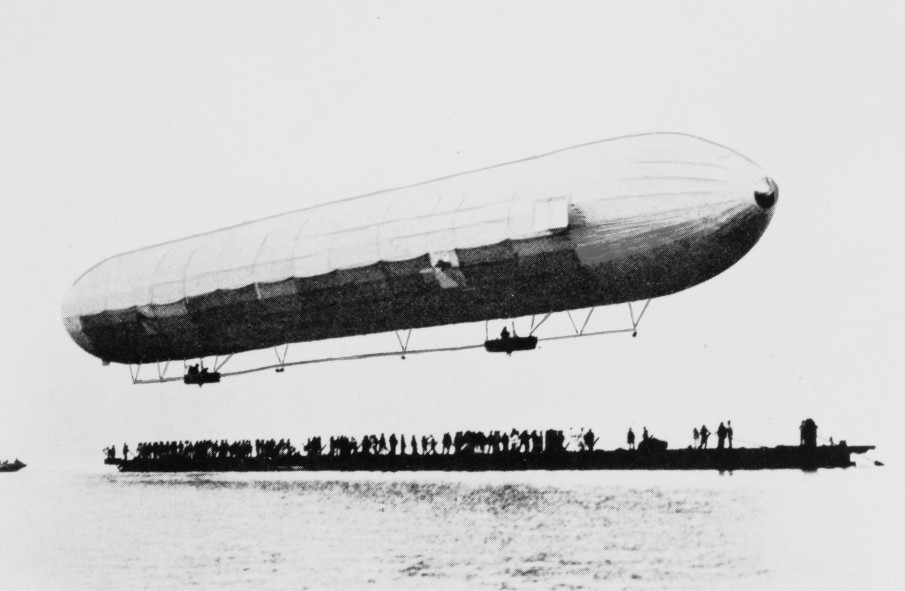
The first ascent of LZ1 over Lake Constance (the Bodensee) in 1900.

- 1900 – The first zeppelin flight occurs over Lake Constance near Friedrichshafen, Germany on July 2, 1900.

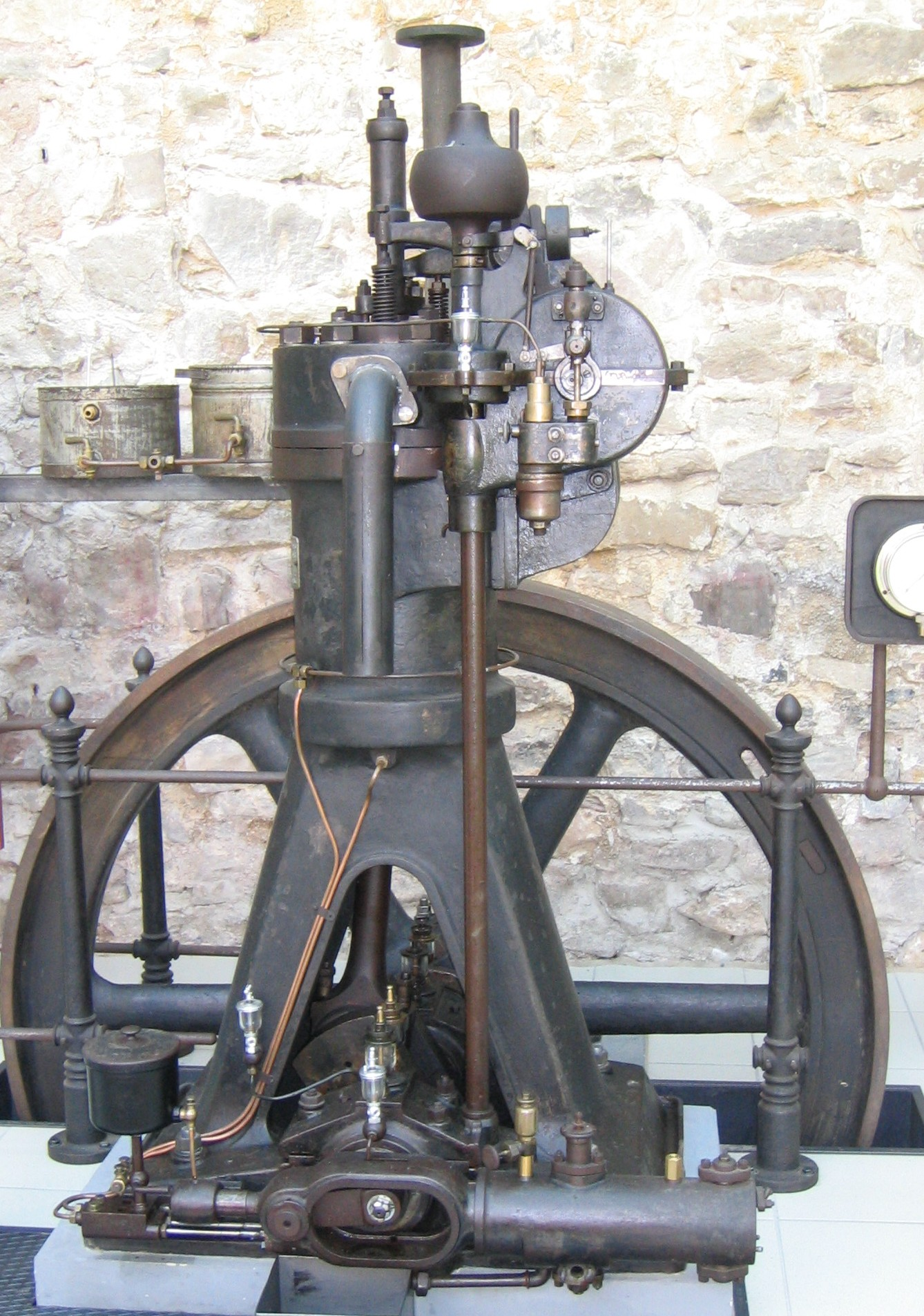
A diesel engine built by MAN AG in 1906

- 1901 – First electric typewriter is invented by George Canfield Blickensderfer of Erie, Pennsylvania. It was part of a line of Blickensderfer typewriters, known for its portability.
- 1901 – Wilhelm Kress of Saint Petersburg, Russia creates his Kress Drachenflieger in Austria-Hungary. Power was provided by a Daimler petrol engine driving two large auger-style two-bladed propellers, the first attempt to use an internal combustion engine to power a heavier-than-air aircraft.
- 1901 – The first radio receiver (successfully received a radio transmission). This receiver was developed by Guglielmo Marconi. Marconi established a wireless transmitting station at Marconi House, Rosslare Strand, County Wexford, Ireland in 1901 to act as a link between Poldhu in Cornwall and Clifden in County Galway. He soon made the announcement that on December 12, 1901, using a 500-foot (150 m) kite-supported antenna for reception, the message was received at Signal Hill in St John's, Newfoundland (now part of Canada), signals transmitted by the company's new high-power station at Poldhu, Cornwall. The distance between the two points was about 2,200 miles (3,500 km).
  Heralded as a great scientific advance, there was—and continues to be—some skepticism about this claim, partly because the signals had been heard faintly and sporadically. There was no independent confirmation of the reported reception, and the transmissions, consisting of the Morse code letter S sent repeatedly, were difficult to distinguish from atmospheric noise. (A detailed technical review of Marconi's early transatlantic work appears in John S. Belrose's work of 1995.) The Poldhu transmitter was a two-stage circuit. The first stage operated at a lower voltage and provided the energy for the second stage to spark at a higher voltage.
- 1902 – Willis Carrier of Angola, New York, invented the first indoor air conditioning. "He designed his spray driven air conditioning system which controlled both temperature and humidity using a nozzle originally designed to spray insecticide. He built his "Apparatus for Treating Air" (U.S. Pat. #808897) which was patented in 1906 and using chilled coils which not only controlled heat but could lower the humidity to as low as 55%. The device was even able to adjust the humidity level to the desired setting creating what would become the framework for the modern air conditioner. By adjusting the air movement and temperature level to the refrigeration coils he was able to determine the size and capacity of the unit to match the need of his customers. While Carrier was not the first to design a system like this his was much more stable, successful and safer than other versions and took air conditioning out of the Dark Ages and into the realm of science."
- 1902/1906/1908 – Sir James Mackenzie of Scone, Scotland, invented an early lie detector or polygraph. MacKenzie's polygraph "could be used to monitor the cardiovascular responses of his patients by taking their pulse and blood pressure. He had developed an early version of his device in the 1890s, but had Sebastian Shaw, a Lancashire watchmaker, improve it further. "This instrument used a clockwork mechanism for the paper-rolling and time-marker movements and it produced ink recordings of physiological functions that were easier to acquire and to interpret. It has been written that the modern polygraph is really a modification of Dr. Mackenzie's clinical ink polygraph." A more modern and effective polygraph machine would be invented by John Larson in 1921.
- 1902 – Georges Claude invented the neon lamp. He applied an electrical discharge to a sealed tube of neon gas, resulting in a red glow. Claudes started working on neon tubes which could be put to use as ordinary light bulbs. His first public display of a neon lamp took place on December 11, 1910, in Paris. In 1912, Claude's associate began selling neon discharge tubes as advertising signs. They were introduced to the United States in 1923 when two large neon signs were bought by a Los Angeles Packard car dealership. The glow and arresting red color made neon advertising completely different from the competition.
- 1902 – Teasmade, a device for making tea automatically, is patented on April 7, 1902, by gunsmith Frank Clarke of Birmingham, England. He called it "An Apparatus Whereby a Cup of Tea or Coffee is Automatically Made" and it was later marketed as "A Clock That Makes Tea!". However, his original machine and all rights to it had been purchased from its actual inventor Albert E. Richardson, a clockmaker from Ashton-under-Lyne. The device was commercially available by 1904.

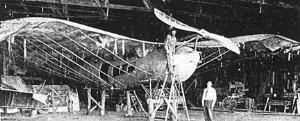
Gilmore's second, larger plane

- 1902 – Lyman Gilmore of Washington, United States is awarded a patent for a steam engine, intended for use in aerial vehicles. At the time he was living in Red Bluff, California. At a later date, Gilmore claimed to have incorporated his engine in "a monoplane with a 32-foot wingspan" and to have performed his debut flight in May 1902. While occasionally credited with the first powered flight in aviation history, there is no supporting evidence for his account. While Gilmore was probably working on aeronautical experiments since the late 1890s and reportedly had correspondence with Samuel Pierpont Langley, there exists no photo of his creations earlier than 1908.
- 1902 – The Wright brothers of Ohio, United States create the 1902 version of the Wright Glider. It was the third free-flight glider built by them and tested at Kitty Hawk, North Carolina. This was the first of the brothers' gliders to incorporate yaw control, and its design led directly to the 1903 Wright Flyer. The brothers designed the 1902 glider during the winter of 1901–1902 at their home in Dayton, Ohio. They designed the wing based on data from extensive airfoil tests conducted on a homemade wind tunnel. They built many of the components of the glider in Dayton, but they completed assembly at their Kitty Hawk camp in September 1902. They began testing on September 19. Over the next five weeks, they made between 700 and 1000 glide flights (as estimated by the brothers, who did not keep detailed records of these tests). The longest of these was 622.5 ft (189.7 m) in 26 seconds. "In its final form, the 1902 Wright glider was the world's first fully controllable aircraft."

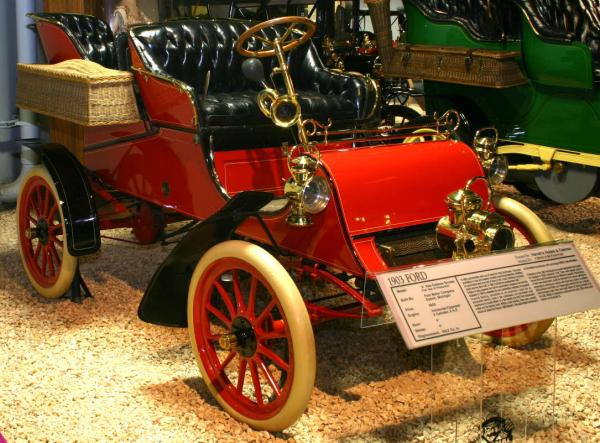
Ford Model A was the first car produced by Ford Motor Company beginning production in 1903.

- 1903 – Ford Motor Company produces its first car – the Ford Model A.

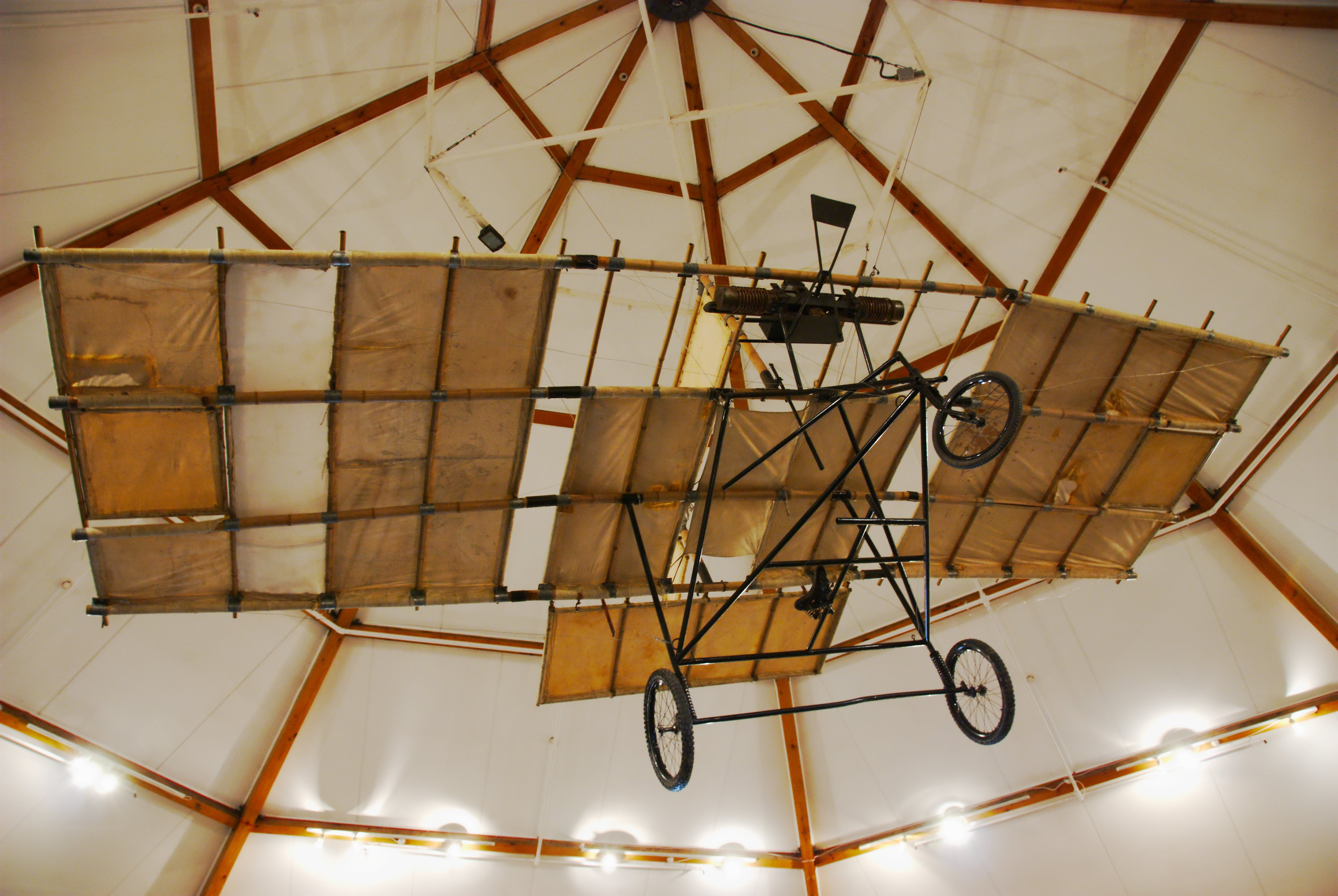
A replica of Pearse's monoplane

- 1903 – Richard Pearse of New Zealand supposedly successfully flew and landed a powered heavier-than-air machine on March 31, 1903 Verifiable eyewitnesses describe Pearse crashing into a hedge on two separate occasions during 1903. His monoplane must have risen to a height of at least three metres on each occasion. Good evidence exists that on March 31, 1903, Pearse achieved a powered, though poorly controlled, flight of several hundred metres. Pearse himself said that he had made a powered takeoff, "but at too low a speed for [his] controls to work". However, he remained airborne until he crashed into the hedge at the end of the field.
- 1903 – Karl Jatho of Germany performs a series of flights at Vahrenwalder Heide, near Hanover, between August and November 1903. Using first a pusher triplane, then a biplane. "His longest flight, however, was only 60 meters at 3–4 meters altitude." He then quit his efforts, noting his motor was too weak to make longer or higher flights. The plane was equipped with a single-cylinder 10 hp (7.5 kW) Buchet engine driving a two-bladed pusher propeller and made hops of up to 200 ft (61 m), flying up to 10 ft (3.0 m) high. In comparison, Orville Wright's first controlled flight four months later was of 36 m (118 ft) in 12 seconds although Wilbur flew 59 seconds and 852 ft (260 m) later that same day. Either way Jatho managed to fly a powered heavier-than-air machine earlier than his American counterparts.
- 1903 – Mary Anderson invented windshield wipers. In November 1903 Anderson was granted her first patent for an automatic car window cleaning device controlled inside the car, called the windshield wiper. Her device consisted of a lever and a swinging arm with a rubber blade. The lever could be operated from inside a vehicle to cause the spring-loaded arm to move back and forth across the windshield. Similar devices had been made earlier, but Anderson's was the first to be effective.

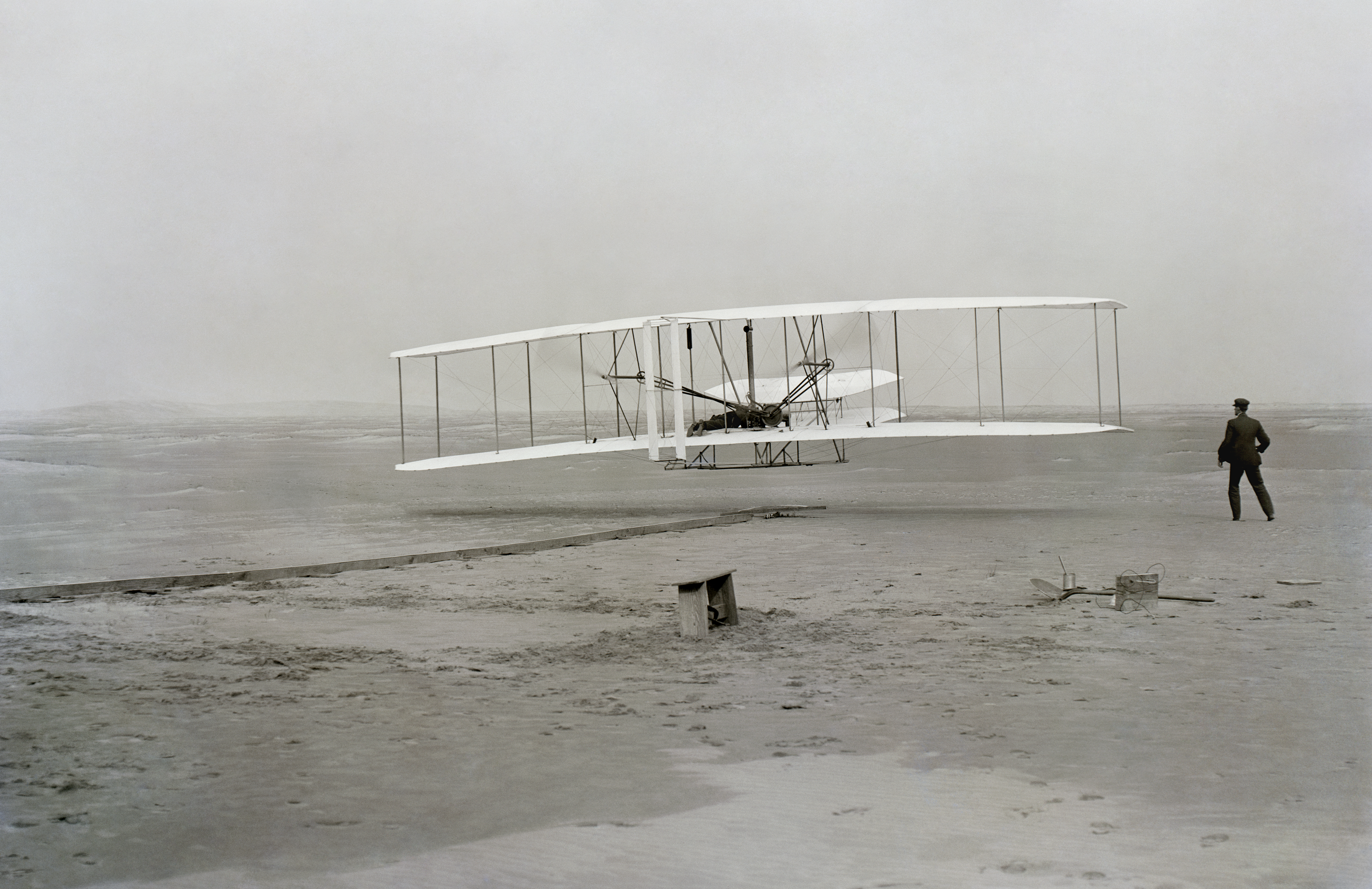
The first flight by Orville Wright made on December 17, 1903.

- 1903 – The Wright brothers fly at Kitty Hawk, North Carolina. Their airplane, the Wright Flyer, performed the first recorded controlled, powered, sustained heavier than air flight on December 17, 1903. In the day's fourth flight, Wilbur Wright flew 279 meters (915 feet) in 59 seconds. First three flights were approximately 120, 175, and 200 ft (61 m), respectively. The Wrights laid particular stress on fully and accurately describing all the requirements for controlled, powered flight and put them into use in an aircraft which took off from a level launching rail, with the aid of a headwind to achieve sufficient airspeed before reaching the end of the rail. It is one of the various candidates regarded as the first flying machine.
- 1904 – SS Haimun sends its first news story on March 15, 1904. It was a Chinese steamer ship commanded by war correspondent Lionel James in 1904 during the Russo-Japanese War for The Times. It is the first known instance of a "press boat" dedicated to war correspondence during naval battles. The recent advent of wireless telegraphy meant that reporters were no longer limited to submitting their stories from land-based offices, and The Times spent 74 days outfitting and equipping the ship, installing a De Forest transmitter aboard the ship.

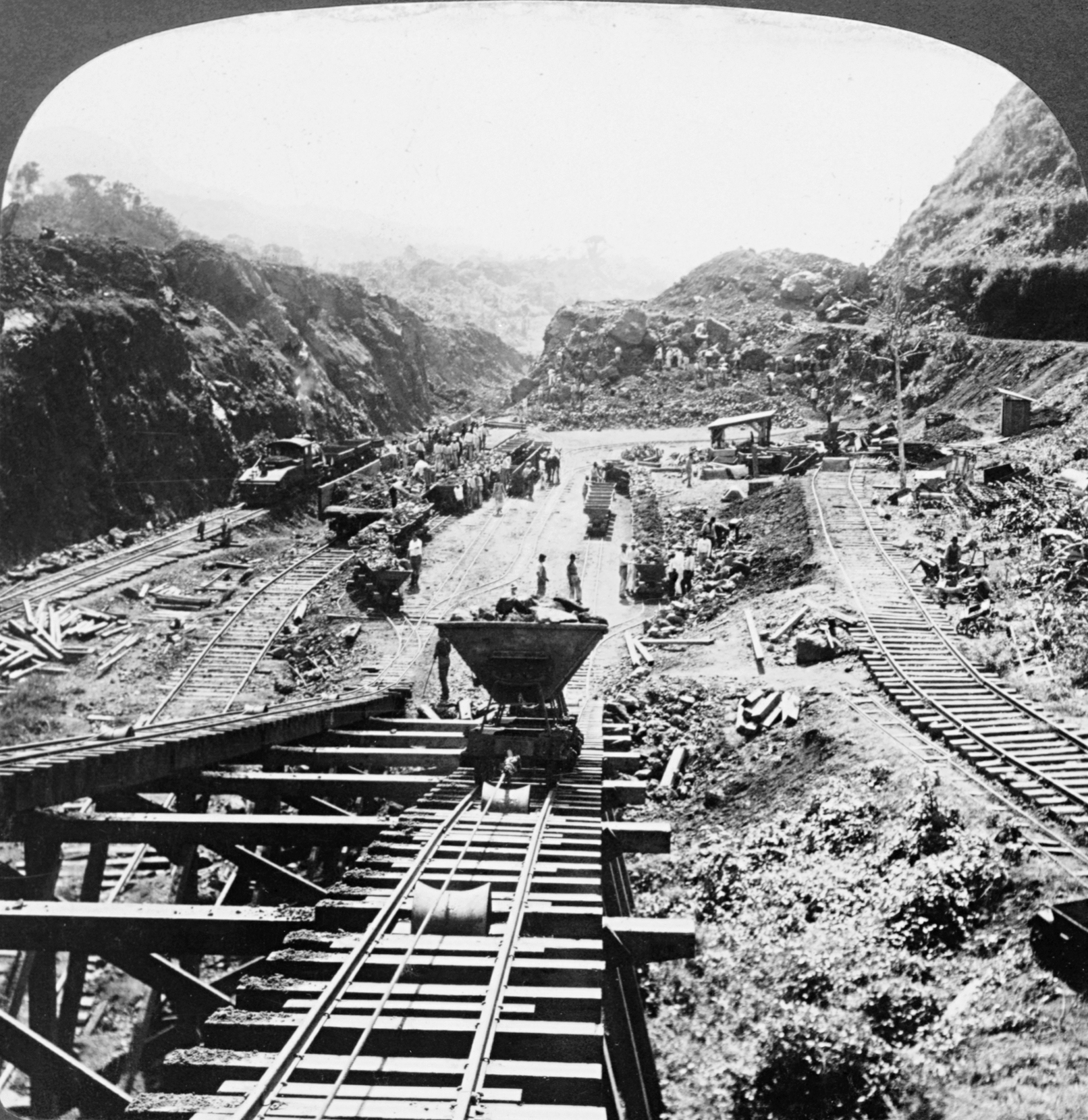
Construction work on the Gaillard Cut is shown in this photograph from 1907

- 1904–1914 – The Panama Canal constructed by the United States in the territory of Panama, which had just gained independence from Colombia. The Canal is a 77 km (48 mi) ship canal that joins the Atlantic Ocean and the Pacific Ocean and a key conduit for international maritime trade. One of the largest and most difficult engineering projects ever undertaken, the canal had an enormous impact on shipping between the two oceans, replacing the long and treacherous route via the Drake Passage and Cape Horn at the southernmost tip of South America. A ship sailing from New York to San Francisco via the canal travels 9,500 km (5,900 mi), well under half the 22,500 km (14,000 mi) route around Cape Horn. The project starts on May 4, 1904, known as Acquisition Day. The United States government purchased all Canal properties on the Isthmus of Panama from the New Panama Canal Company, except the Panama Railroad. The project begun under the administration of Theodore Roosevelt, continued in that of William Howard Taft and completed in that of Woodrow Wilson. The Chief engineers were John Frank Stevens and George Washington Goethals
- 1904 – The Welte-Mignon reproducing piano is created by Edwin Welte and Karl Bockisch. Both employed by the "Michael Welte und Söhne" firm of Freiburg im Breisgau, Germany. "It automatically replayed the tempo, phrasing, dynamics and pedalling of a particular performance, and not just the notes of the music, as was the case with other player pianos of the time." In September 1904, the Mignon was demonstrated in the Leipzig Trade Fair. In March 1905 it became better known when showcased "at the showrooms of Hugo Popper, a manufacturer of roll-operated orchestrions". By 1906, the Mignon was also exported to the United States, installed to pianos by the firms Feurich and Steinway & Sons.
- 1904 – Benjamin Holt of the Holt Manufacturing Company invents one of the first practical continuous tracks for use in tractors. While the date of invention was reportedly November 24, 1904, Holt would not receive a patent until December 1907.
- 1905 – John Joseph Montgomery of California, United States designs tandem-wing gliders. His pilot Daniel Maloney performs a number of public exhibitions of high altitude flights in March and April 1905 in the Santa Clara, California, area. These flights received national media attention and demonstrated superior control of the design, with launches as high as 4,000 feet (1,200 m) and landings made at predetermined locations. The gliders were launched from balloons.
- 1905 – The Wright Brothers introduce their Wright Flyer III. On October 5, 1905, Wilbur flew 24 miles (39 km) in 39 minutes 23 seconds, longer than the total duration of all the flights of 1903 and 1904. Ending with a safe landing when the fuel ran out. The flight was seen by a number of people, including several invited friends, their father Milton, and neighboring farmers. Four days later, they wrote to the United States Secretary of War William Howard Taft, offering to sell the world's first practical fixed-wing aircraft.
- 1906 – The Gabel Automatic Entertainer, an early jukebox-like machine, is invented by John Gabel. It is the first such device to play a series of gramophone records. "The Automatic Entertainer with 24 selections, was produced and patented by the John Gabel owned company in Chicago. The first model (constructed in 1905) was produced in 1906 with an exposed 40 inch horn (102 cm) on top, and it is today often considered the real father of the modern multi-selection disc-playing phonographs. John Gabel and his company did in fact receive a special prize at the Pan-Pacific Exposition for the Automatic Entertainer."

Alberto Santos-Dumont realizes the first official flight, October 23, 1906, Bagatelle field.

- 1906 – The Victor Talking Machine Company releases the Victrola, the most popular gramophone model until the late 1920s. The Victrola is also the first playback machine containing an internal horn. Victor also erects the world's largest illuminated billboard at the time, on Broadway in New York City, to advertise the company's records.
- 1906 – Traian Vuia of Romania takes off with his "Traian Vuia 1", an early monoplane. His flight was performed in Montesson near Paris and was about 12 meters long.
- 1906 – Jacob Ellehammer of Denmark constructs the Ellehammer semi-biplane. In this machine, he made a tethered flight on September 12, 1906, becoming the second European to make a powered flight.
- 1906 – Alberto Santos-Dumont and his Santos-Dumont 14-bis make the first public flight of an airplane on October 23, 1906, in Paris. The flying machine was the first fixed-wing aircraft officially witnessed to take off, fly, and land. Santos Dumont is considered the "Father of Aviation" in his country of birth, Brazil. His flight is the first to have been certified by the Aéro-Club de France and the Fédération Aéronautique Internationale (FAI). On November 12, 1906, Santos Dumont succeeded in setting the first world record recognized by the Aero-Club De France by flying 220 metres in less than 22 seconds.
- 1906 – Sound radio broadcasting was invented by Reginald Fessenden and Lee De Forest. Fessenden and Ernst Alexanderson developed a high-frequency alternator-transmitters, an improvement on an already existing device. The improved model operated at a transmitting frequency of approximately 50 kHz, although with far less power than Fessenden's rotary-spark transmitters. The alternator-transmitter achieved the goal of transmitting quality audio signals, but the lack of any way to amplify the signals meant they were somewhat weak. On December 21, 1906, Fessenden made an extensive demonstration of the new alternator-transmitter at Brant Rock, showing its utility for point-to-point wireless telephony, including interconnecting his stations to the wire telephone network. A detailed review of this demonstration appeared in The American Telephone Journal. Meanwhile, De Forest had developed the Audion tube an electronic amplifier device. He received a patent in January 1907. "DeForest's audion vacuum tube was the key component of all radio, telephone, radar, television, and computer systems before the invention of the transistor in 1947."
- 1906 – Reginald Fessenden of East Bolton, Quebec, Canada made what appear to be the first audio radio broadcasts of entertainment and music ever made to a general audience. (Beginning in 1904, the United States Navy had broadcast daily time signals and weather reports, but these employed spark-gap transmitters, transmitting in Morse code). On the evening of December 24, 1906 (Christmas Eve), Fessenden used the alternator-transmitter to send out a short program from Brant Rock, Plymouth County, Massachusetts. It included a phonograph record of Ombra mai fù (Largo) by George Frideric Handel, followed by Fessenden himself playing the song O Holy Night on the violin. Finishing with reading a passage from the Bible: 'Glory to God in the highest and on earth peace to men of good will' (Gospel of Luke 2:14). On December 31, New Year's Eve, a second short program was broadcast. The main audience for both these transmissions was an unknown number of shipboard radio operators along the East Coast of the United States. Fessenden claimed that the Christmas Eve broadcast had been heard "as far down" as Norfolk, Virginia, while the New Year Eve's broadcast had reached places in the Caribbean. Although now seen as a landmark, these two broadcasts were barely noticed at the time and soon forgotten— the only first-hand account appears to be a letter Fessenden wrote on January 29, 1932, to his former associate, Samuel M. Kinter.

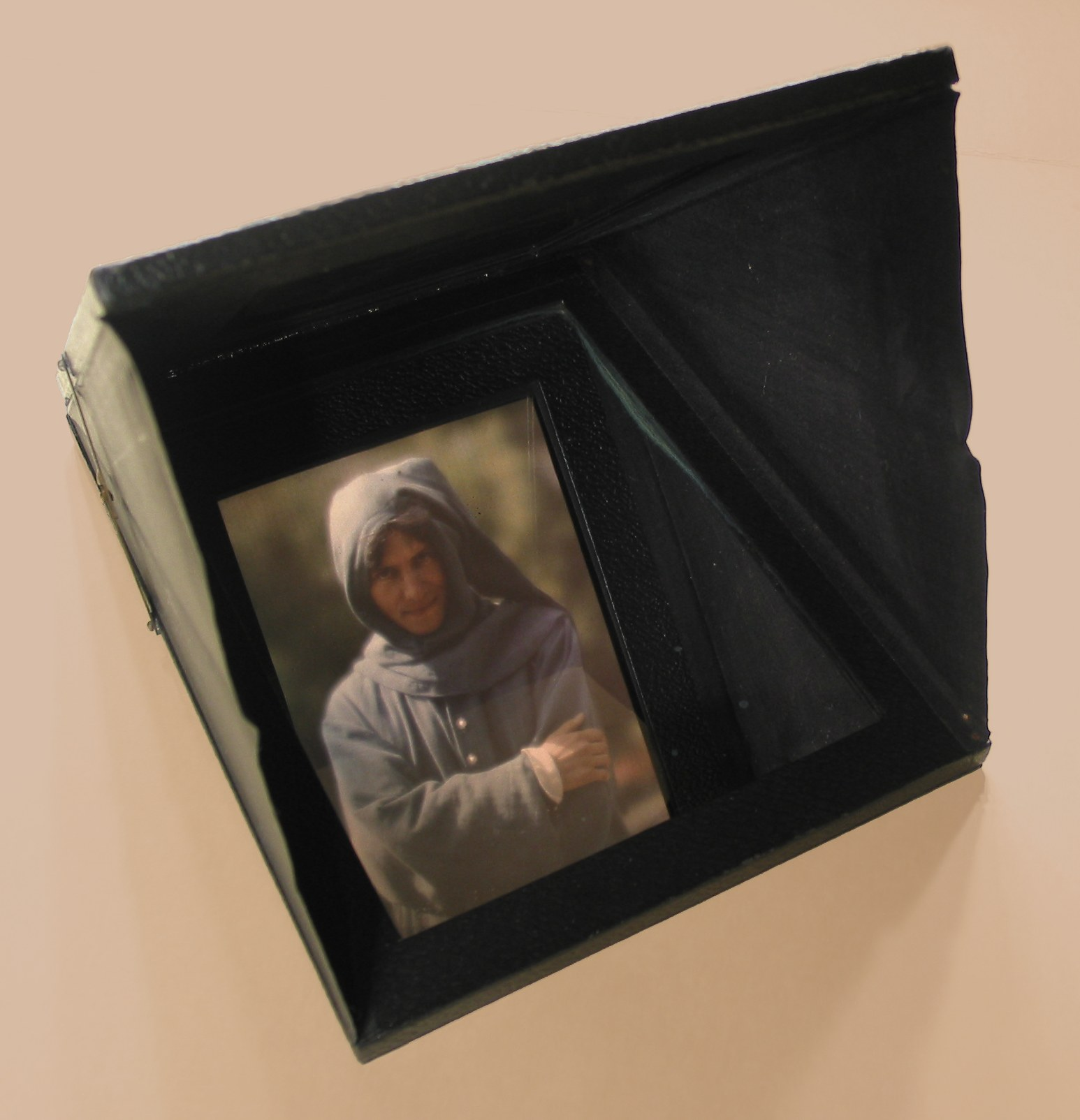
The Autochrome Lumière becomes the first commercial color photography process.

- 1907 – The Autochrome Lumière which was patented in 1903 becomes the first commercial color photography process.
- 1907 – Thomas Edison invented the "Universal Electric Motor" which made it possible to operate dictation machines, etc. on all lighting circuits.
- 1907 – The Photostat machine begins the modern era of document imaging. The Photostat machine was invented in Kansas City, Kansas, United States by Oscar Gregory in 1907, and the Photostat Corporation was incorporated in Rhode Island in 1911. "Rectigraph and Photostat machines (Plates 40–42) combined a large camera and a developing machine and used sensitized paper furnished in 350-foot rolls. "The prints are made direct on sensitized paper, no negative, plate or film intervening. The usual exposure is ten seconds. After the exposure has been made the paper is cut off and carried underneath the exposure chamber to the developing bath, where it remains for 35 seconds, and is then drawn into a fixing bath. While one print is being developed or fixed, another exposure can be made. When the copies are removed from the fixing bath, they are allowed to dry by exposure to the air, or may be run through a drying machine. The first print taken from the original is a 'black' print; the whites in the original are black and the blacks, white. (Plate 43) A white 'positive' print of the original is made by rephotographing the black print. As many positives as required may be made by continuing to photograph the black print." (The American Digest of Business Machines, 1924.) Du Pont Co. files include black prints of graphs dating from 1909, and the company acquired a Photostat machine in 1912. ... A 1914 Rectigraph ad stated that the US government had been using Rectigraphs for four years and stated that the machines were being used by insurance companies and abstract and title companies. ... In 1911, a Photostat machine was $500."

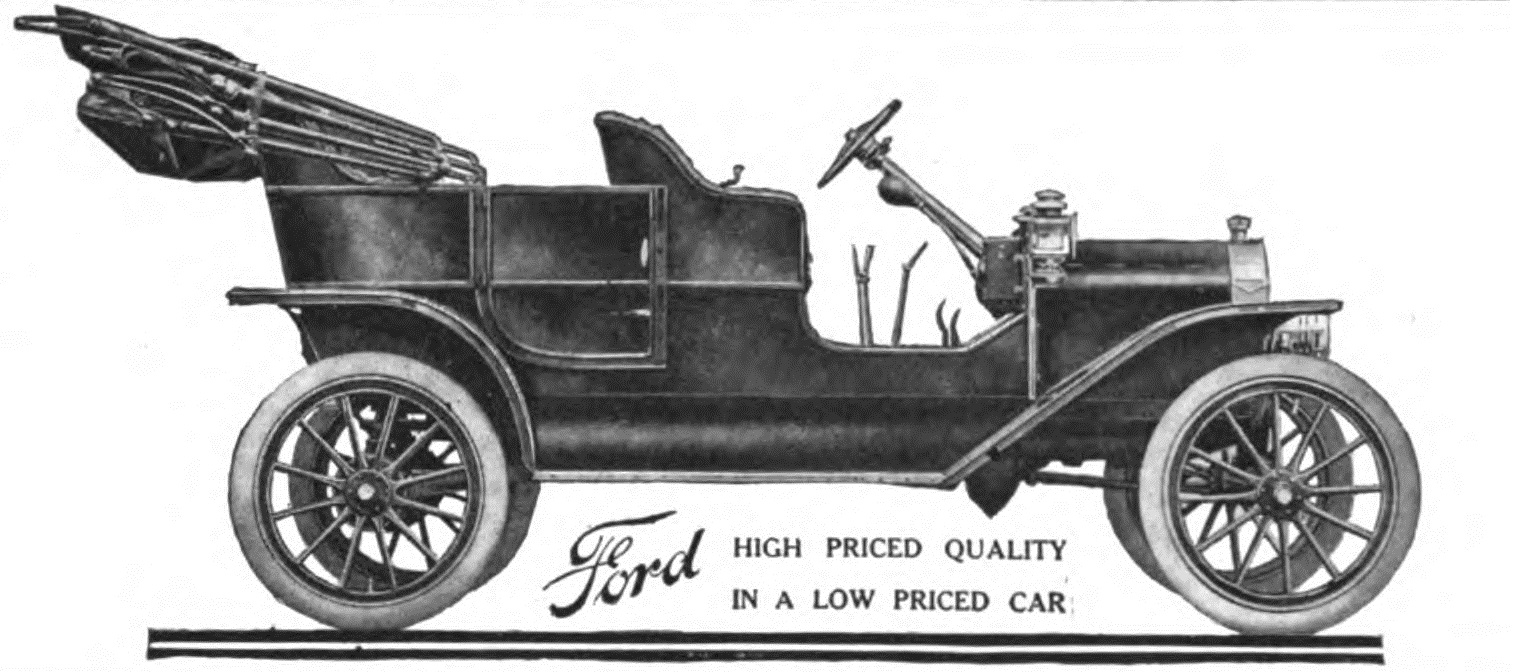
Ford Model T set 1908 as the historic year that the automobile came into popular usage as it is generally regarded as the first affordable automobile.

- 1908 – Henry Ford of the Ford Motor Company introduces the Ford Model T. The first production Model T was built on September 27, 1908, at the Ford Piquette Avenue Plant in Detroit. It is generally regarded as the first affordable automobile, the car that "put America on wheels"; some of this was because of Ford's innovations, including assembly line production instead of individual hand crafting, as well as the concept of paying the workers a wage proportionate to the cost of the car, so that they would provide a ready made market.
- 1909 – Leo Baekeland of Sint-Martens-Latem, Belgium officially announces his creation of Bakelite. The announcement was made at the February 1909 meeting of the New York section of the American Chemical Society. Bakelite is an inexpensive, nonflammable, versatile, and popular plastic.

== Popular culture ==
=== Literature ===
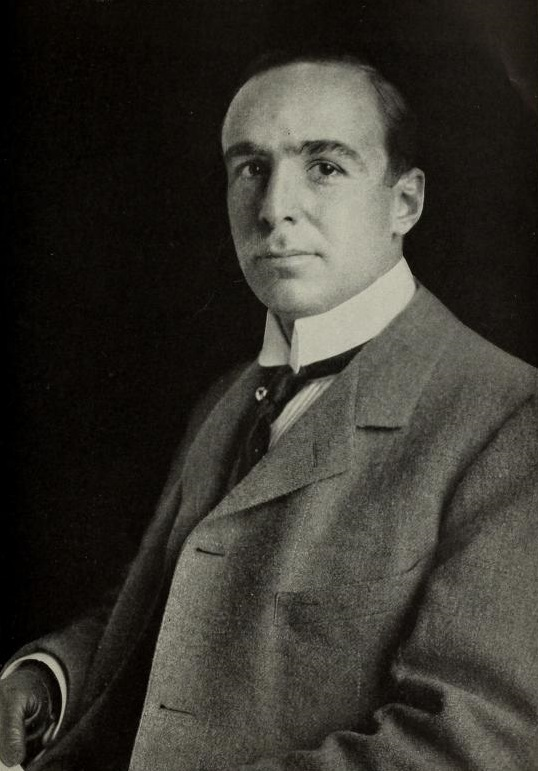
4 out of 10 best-selling American books in the 1900s were written by Winston Churchill (1871 – 1947)

The best selling books of the decade were Anne of Green Gables (1908) and The Tale of Peter Rabbit (1902), which sold 50 million and 45 million copies respectively. Serbian writers used the Belgrade literary style, an Ekavian writing form which set basis for the later standardization of the Serbian language. Theodor Herzl, the founder of political Zionism, published The Old New Land in 1902, outlining Herzl's vision for a Jewish state in the Land of Israel.

Below are the best-selling books in the United States of each year, as determined by Publishers Weekly.

- 1900: To Have and to Hold by Mary Johnston
- 1901: The Crisis by Winston Churchill
- 1902: The Virginian by Owen Wister
- 1903: Lady Rose's Daughter by Mary Augusta Ward
- 1904: The Crossing by Winston Churchill
- 1905: The Marriage of William Ashe by Mary Augusta Ward
- 1906: Coniston by Winston Churchill
- 1907: The Lady of the Decoration by Frances Little
- 1908: Mr. Crewe's Career by Winston Churchill
- 1909: The Inner Shrine by Anonymous (Basil King)

=== Art ===
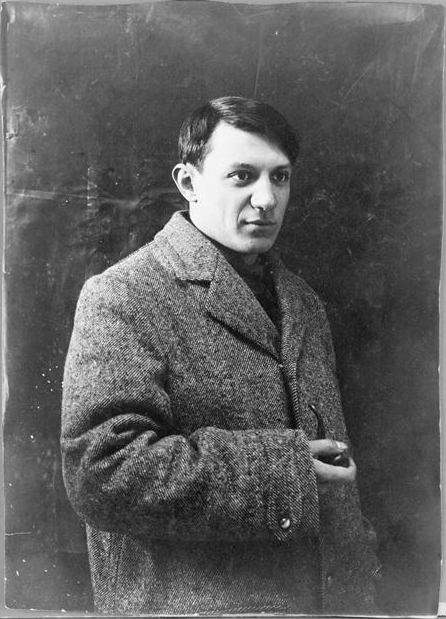
Pablo Picasso in 1908, who, along with Henri Matisse, was considered a leader in modern art

- Pablo Picasso paints Les Demoiselles d'Avignon, considered by some to be the birth of modern art.
- Art Nouveau art movement peaked in popularity at the turn of the 20th century (1890–1905).
- Cubism art movement peaked in popularity in France between 1907 and 1911.
- Fauvism art movement peaked in popularity between 1905 and 1907.

=== Film ===
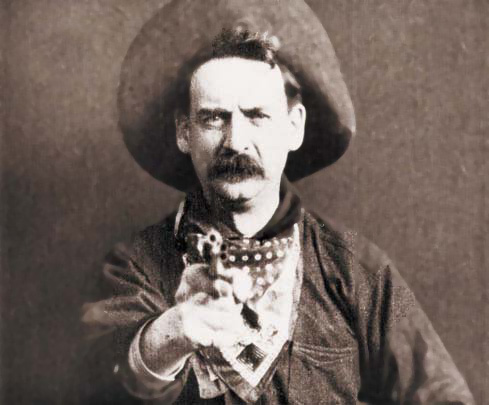
Justus D. Barnes in Edwin Porter's film The Great Train Robbery, 1903

- September 18, 1900 – Robert W. Paul releases a short movie called Army Life; or, How Soldiers Are Made: Mounted Infantry.
- April 2, 1902 – Electric Theatre, the first movie theater in the United States, opens in Los Angeles.
- The first huge success of American cinema, as well as the largest experimental achievement to this point, was the 1903 film The Great Train Robbery, directed by Edwin S. Porter.
- December 26, 1906 – The world's first feature film, The Story of the Kelly Gang is released on December 26, 1906, in Melbourne, Australia.
- May 12, 1909 – Mr. Flip is released, the first film to feature someone being hit in the face with a pie.

=== Music ===
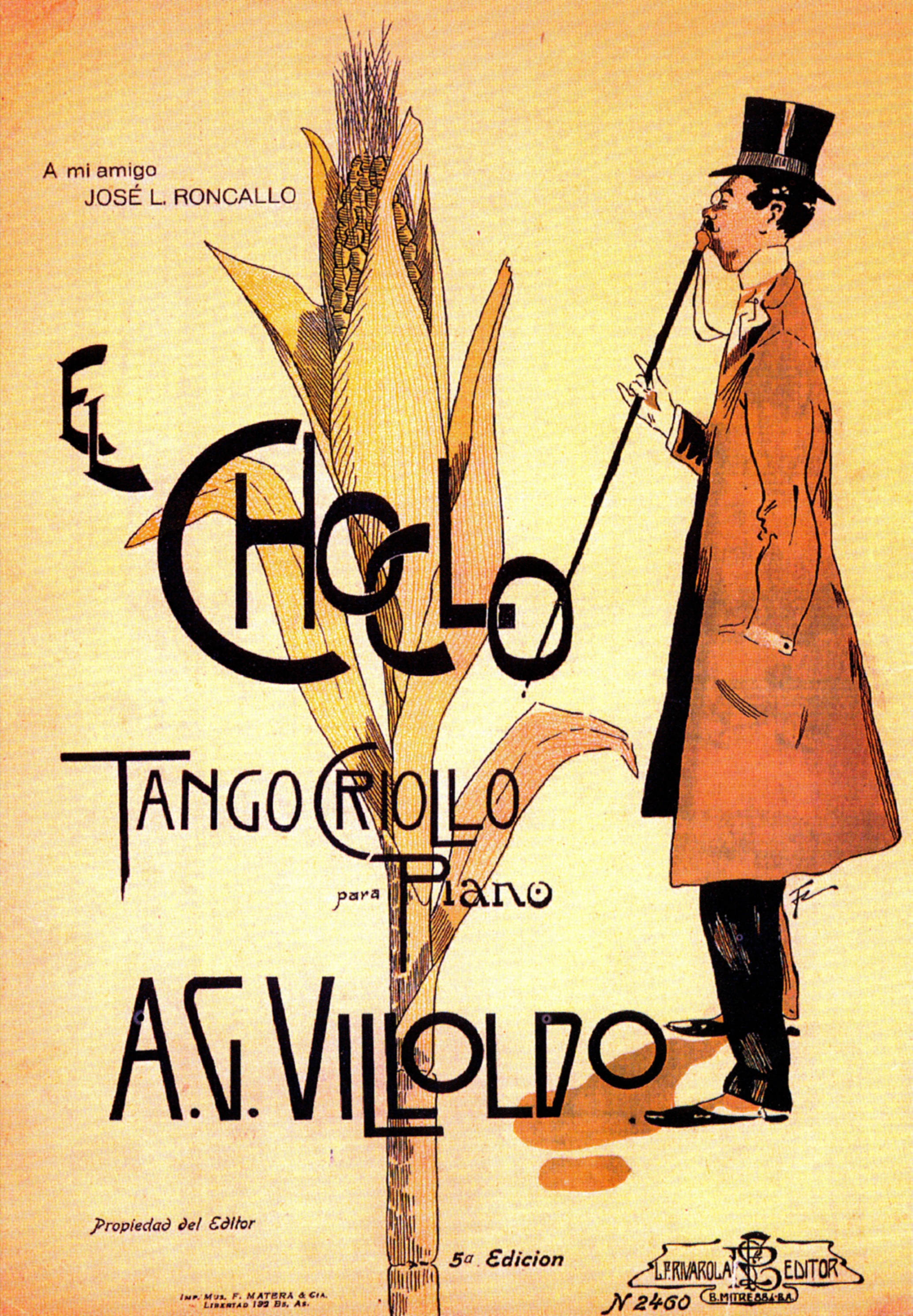
El Choclo by Ángel Villoldo

Popular songs of the 1900s include "Lift Every Voice and Sing" and "What Are They Doing in Heaven?", which have been featured in 42 and 16 hymnals respectively.

  - January 23, 1900 - The Pittsburgh Symphony Orchestra makes its Carnegie Hall debut with Victor Herbert conducting.
  - February 3, 1900 – Adonais, overture by George Whitefield Chadwick is premiered by the Boston Symphony Orchestra.
  - December 15, 1900 – The second and third movements of Concerto No.2 in C Minor for Piano by Sergei Rachmaninov receive their world premiere in Moscow, with Rachmaninov playing the solo part.
  - March 29, 1901 - Jean de Reszke's final performance of the season with the Metropolitan Opera turns into his farewell performance with that company as he sings the title role in Wagner's Lohengrin.
  - October 27, 1901 – Claude Debussy's Trois Nocturnes is given in its first complete performance as Camille Chevillard conducts the Lamoureux Orchestra in Paris.
  - November 9, 1901 - First complete performance of Sergei Rachmaninoff's Piano Concerto no. 2 in C minor in Moscow with Rachmaninoff playing the solo part.
  - December 16, 1902 - Scott Joplin's signature rag, "The Entertainer", is released.
  - 1903 - El Choclo one of the most popular tangos of all time, composed by Ángel Villoldo is premiered.
  - October 18, 1904 – Gustav Mahler's Symphony No. 5 is premiered by the Gürzenich Orchestra Cologne with Mahler conducting.
  - 1905 - La Morocha, the first successful sung tango by Ángel Villoldo and Enrique Saborido is published.
  - 1905 - Claude Debussy releases his masterpiece and signature song, "Clair de Lune".
  - January 27, 1907 – Executives of the Metropolitan Opera removes Richard Strauss's Salome from the repertoire following protests that the opera was indecent.
  - January 26, 1908 – Sergei Rachmaninoff's Symphony No. 2 receives its première.
  - March 15, 1908 – Maurice Ravel's Rapsodie espagnole receives its première in Paris.
  - April 11, 1908 – Spyridon Samaras's opera Rhea is premiered in Florence (Teatro Verdi)
  - September 19, 1908 – Première of Gustav Mahler's Symphony No. 7 in Prague.
  - January 25, 1909 – Richard Strauss's opera Elektra receives its debut performance at the Dresden State Opera
  - February 19, 1909 – First production Bedřich Smetana's opera Prodaná nevěsta (The Bartered Bride) in the USA v Metropolitan Opera, conducted by Gustav Mahler with Ema Destinová in the titular role.
  - February 22, 1909 – Thomas Beecham conducts the first concert with his newly established Beecham Symphony Orchestra in the UK.
  - November 8, 1909 – Boston Opera House in the United States opens with a performance of La Gioconda starring Lillian Nordica and Louise Homer.
  - November 28, 1909 – Sergei Rachmaninoff's Piano Concerto No. 3 is premièred in New York City.
  - December 18, 1909 – George Enescu's Octet for Strings and Piano Quartet No. 1 in D Major are premiered together on a program also featuring his Sept chansons de Clement Marot, Op. 15, at the Salle des agriculteurs in Paris, as part of the "Soirées d'Art" concert series.

=== Historic events ===
- Agustín Lizárraga discovers Machu Picchu on July 14, 1902.

=== Sports ===
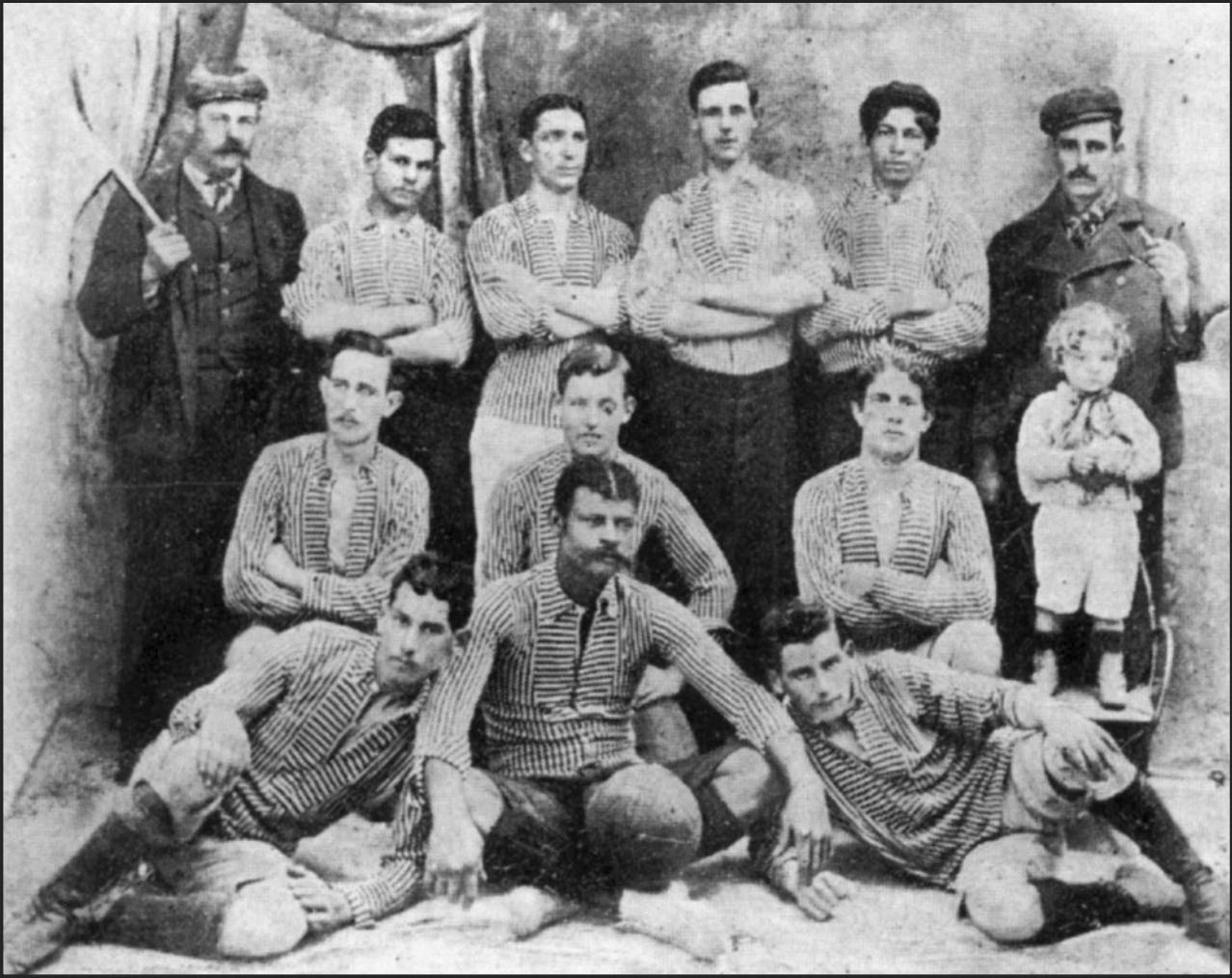
The first recorded photo of Boca Juniors taken in 1906, after winning the Liga Central championship.

- Club Atlético River Plate is founded in 1901.
- Real Madrid CF is founded in 1902.
- The Tour de France starts for the first time in 1903.
- Racing Club de Avellaneda is founded in 1903.
- Club Atlético Independiente is founded in 1905.
- Club Atlético Boca Juniors is founded in 1905.

=== Food ===
- New Haven, Connecticut Louis Lassen of Louis' Lunch makes the first modern-day hamburger sandwich. According to family legend, one day in 1900 a local businessman dashed into the small New Haven lunch wagon and pleaded for a lunch to go. According to the Lassen family, the customer, Gary Widmore, exclaimed "Louie! I'm in a rush, slap a meatpuck between two planks and step on it!". Louis Lassen, the establishment's owner, placed his own blend of ground steak trimmings between two slices of toast and sent the gentleman on his way, so the story goes, with America's alleged first hamburger being served.

== People ==
=== Modern artists ===
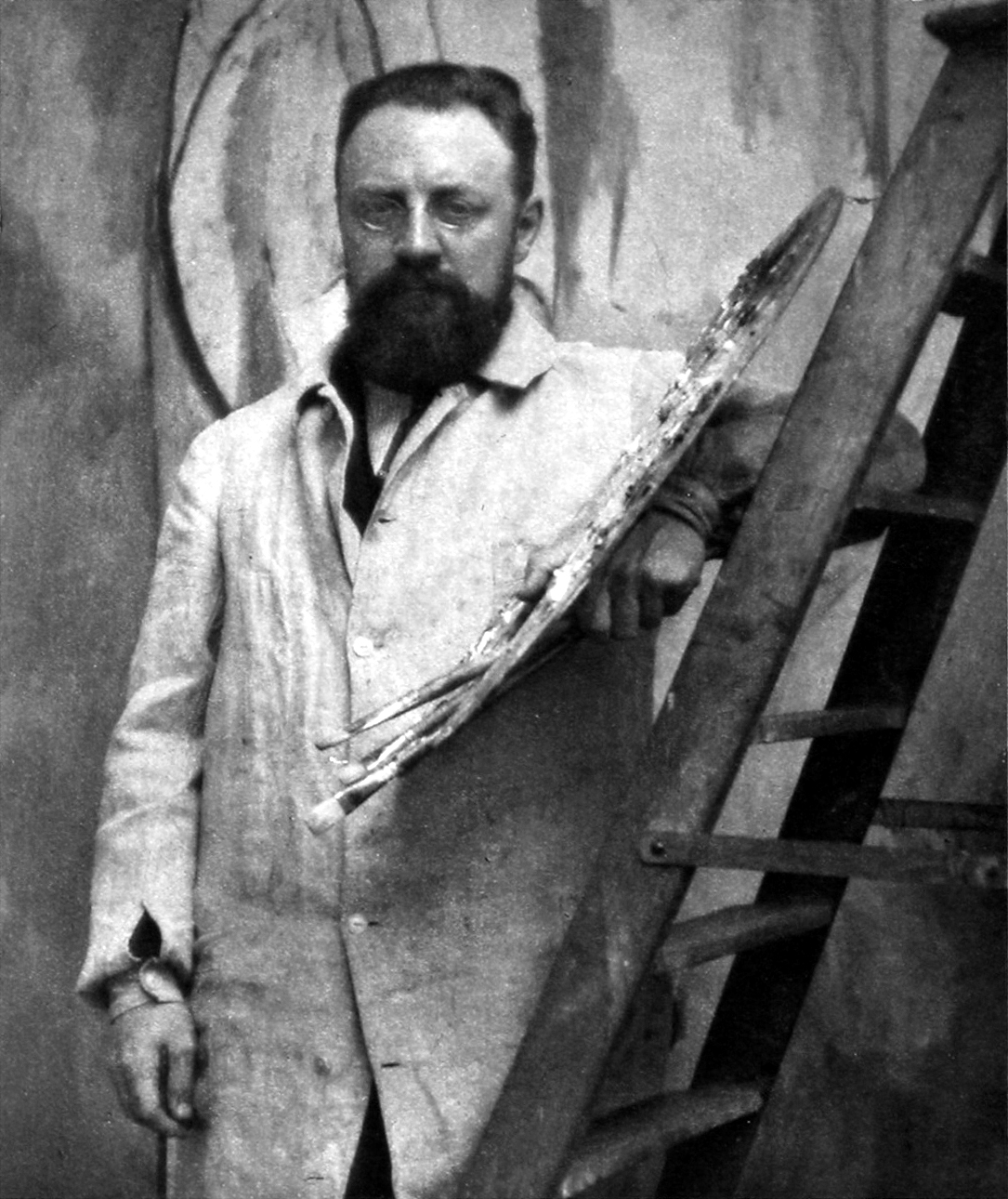
Henri Matisse

- Umberto Boccioni
- Pierre Bonnard
- Georges Braque
- Paul Cézanne
- Marc Chagall
- Edgar Degas
- André Derain
- Raoul Dufy
- Paul Gauguin
- Juan Gris
- Wassily Kandinsky
- Gustav Klimt
- Fernand Léger
- Kazimir Malevich
- Henri Matisse
- Amedeo Modigliani
- Claude Monet
- Pablo Picasso
- Pierre-Auguste Renoir
- Auguste Rodin
- Georges Rouault
- Henri Rousseau
- Albert Pinkham Ryder
- Egon Schiele
- Gino Severini
- Paul Signac
- Henri Toulouse-Lautrec
- Suzanne Valadon
- Maurice de Vlaminck
- Gustave Caillebotte
- Édouard Manet
- Camille Pissarro
- Georges Seurat
- Alfred Sisley

=== Other notable people ===
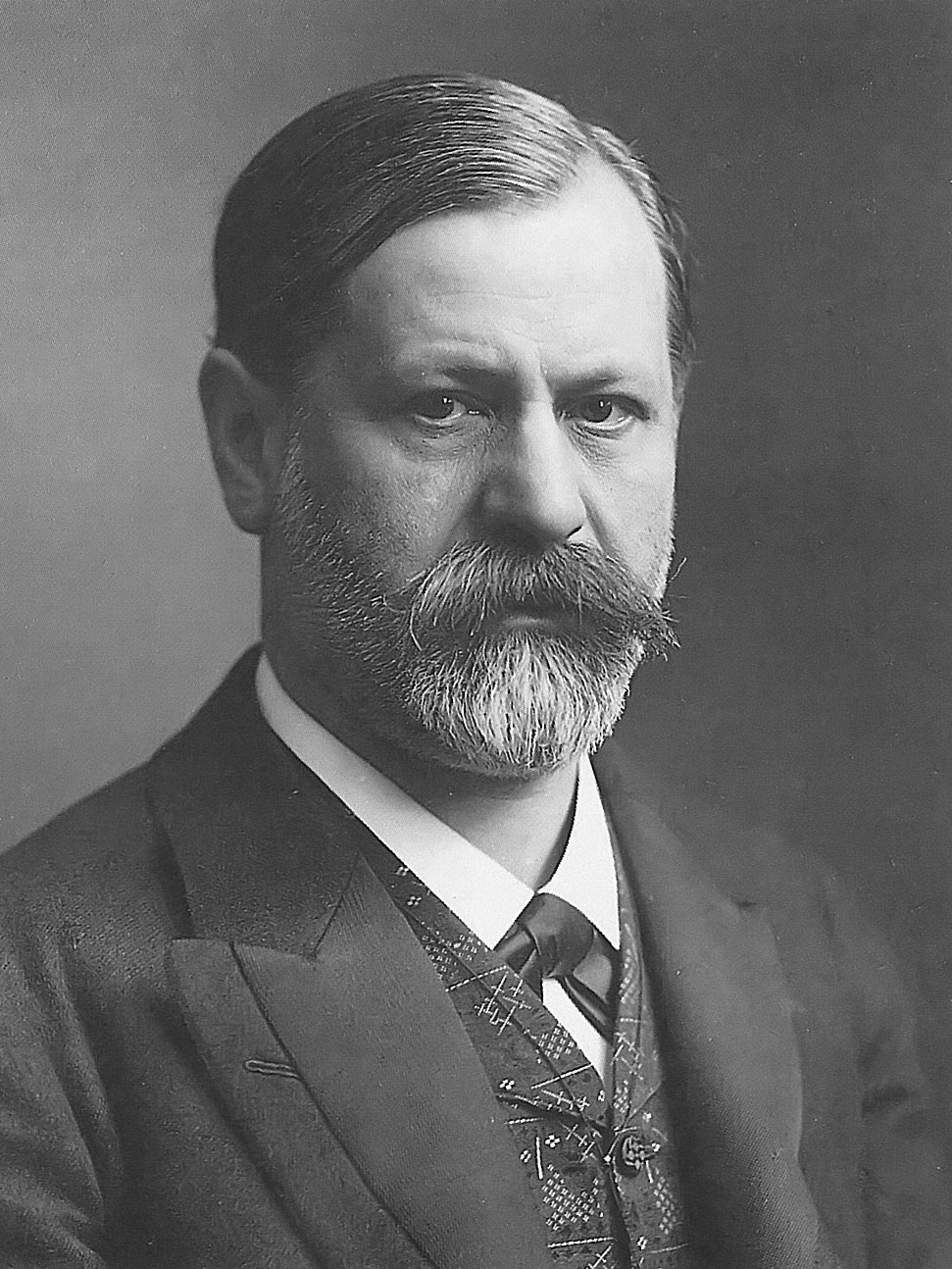
Sigmund Freud, 1905

- Agustín Lizárraga
- Eugen d'Albert
- Hugo Alfvén
- Egbert Van Alstyne
- Broncho Billy Anderson
- Fatty Arbuckle
- Louis Daniel Armstrong
- Kurt Atterberg
- Béla Bartók
- Nora Bayes
- Jagdish Chandra Bose
- Irving Berlin
- Francis Boggs
- Frank Bridge
- Alfred Bryan
- Vincent P. Bryan
- Ferruccio Busoni
- Enrico Caruso
- Gustave Charpentier
- Thurland Chattaway
- Francesco Cilea
- Will D. Cobb
- Bob Cole
- Frederick Converse
- Henry Creamer
- Henry Walford Davies
- Peter Dawson
- Claude Debussy
- Frederick Delius
- Paul Dresser
- Antonín Dvořák
- Gus Edwards
- Edward Elgar
- August Enna
- Manuel de Falla
- Geraldine Farrar
- Fred Fisher
- Paul Le Flem
- Sigmund Freud
- Rudolf Friml
- Julius Fučík
- Amelita Galli-Curci
- Mary Garden
- Edward German
- Alexander Glazunov
- Emilio de Gogorza
- Percy Grainger
- Enrique Granados
- D. W. Griffith
- Guy d'Hardelot
- Hamilton Harty
- The Haydn Quartet
- Anna Held
- Victor Herbert
- Max Hoffmann
- Gustav Holst
- Abe Holzmann
- David Horsley
- Harry Houdini
- Mississippi John Hurt
- Jenö Huszka
- Mikhail Ippolitov-Ivanov
- Carrie Jacobs-Bond
- Alfred Jarry
- William Jerome
- J. Rosamond Johnson
- James Weldon Johnson
- Scott Joplin
- Gus Kahn
- Jerome Kern
- Rudyard Kipling
- Carl Laemmle
- Harry Lauder
- Lead Belly
- Franz Lehár
- Ruggiero Leoncavallo
- Paul Lincke
- Gustav Mahler
- Arthur Marshall
- Jules Massenet
- Nikolai Karlovich Medtner
- Nellie Melba
- Georges Méliès
- Kerry Mills
- Billy Murray
- Evelyn Nesbit
- Ethelbert Woodbridge Nevin
- Carl Nielsen
- Jack Norworth
- Vítězslav Novák
- Maude Nugent
- Sidney Olcott
- Charles Pathé
- Edwin S. Porter
- Giacomo Puccini
- Sergei Rachmaninoff
- Maurice Ravel
- Ottorino Respighi
- Nikolai Rimsky-Korsakov
- Landon Ronald
- Paul Sarebresole
- Erik Satie
- Arnold Schoenberg
- Jean Schwartz
- James Scott
- Alexander Scriabin
- William Selig
- Chris Smith
- Harry B. Smith
- Ethel Smyth
- John Philip Sousa
- George Kirke Spoor
- Charles Villiers Stanford
- Andrew B. Sterling
- Oscar Strauss
- Harry Von Tilzer
- Tom Turpin
- Edgard Varèse
- Vesta Victoria
- Anton Webern
- Percy Wenrich
- Bert Williams
- Harry Williams
- Ermanno Wolf-Ferrari
- Amy Woodforde-Finden
- Israel Zangwill
- Ferdinand von Zeppelin
- Charles A. Zimmerman

=== Sports figures ===
==== Baseball ====
- Chief Bender
- 3-Finger Brown
- Jack Chesbro
- Ty Cobb
- Pud Galvin
- Addie Joss
- Nap Lajoie
- Sam Leever
- Christy Mathewson
- John McGraw
- Kid Nichols
- Eddie Plank
- Tris Speaker
- Rube Waddell
- Honus Wagner
- Big Ed Walsh
- Cy Young

==== Boxing ====
- Tommy Burns
- Marvin Hart (boxing)
- James J. Jeffries (boxing)
- Jack Johnson (boxing)
- Kid McCoy (boxing)

==== Cricket ====
- Warwick Armstrong
- Sydney Barnes
- Colin Blythe
- Len Braund
- Aubrey Faulkner
- Tip Foster
- C.B. Fry
- Dick Lilley
- Tom Hayward
- Clem Hill
- George Hirst
- Monty Noble
- K.S. Ranjitsinhji
- Wilfred Rhodes
- Percy Sherwell
- George Thompson (cricketer)
- Victor Trumper
- Johnny Tyldesley
- Bert Vogler

=== Last survivors ===
Since the deaths of Okagi Hayashi of Japan on April 26, 2025, and Inah Canabarro Lucas of Brazil on April 30, 2025, there is one remaining verified living person born in the 1900s decade, Ethel Caterham (born August 21, 1909) of the United Kingdom. The last surviving man born during this decade was Juan Vicente Pérez of Venezuela (May 27, 1909 – April 2, 2024).

== See also ==
- List of decades, centuries, and millennia
- Edwardian era
- Progressive Era
- List of years in literature § 1900s
- Victorians, the last people to mature in the 19th century in the year 1900
- Lost Generation, the generation whose older members became adults in the 1900s

=== Timeline ===
The following articles contain brief timelines which list the most prominent events of the decade:

1900 • 1901 • 1902 • 1903 • 1904 • 1905 • 1906 • 1907 • 1908 • 1909
