= Ivan Kulikov =

Russian painter (1875–1941)

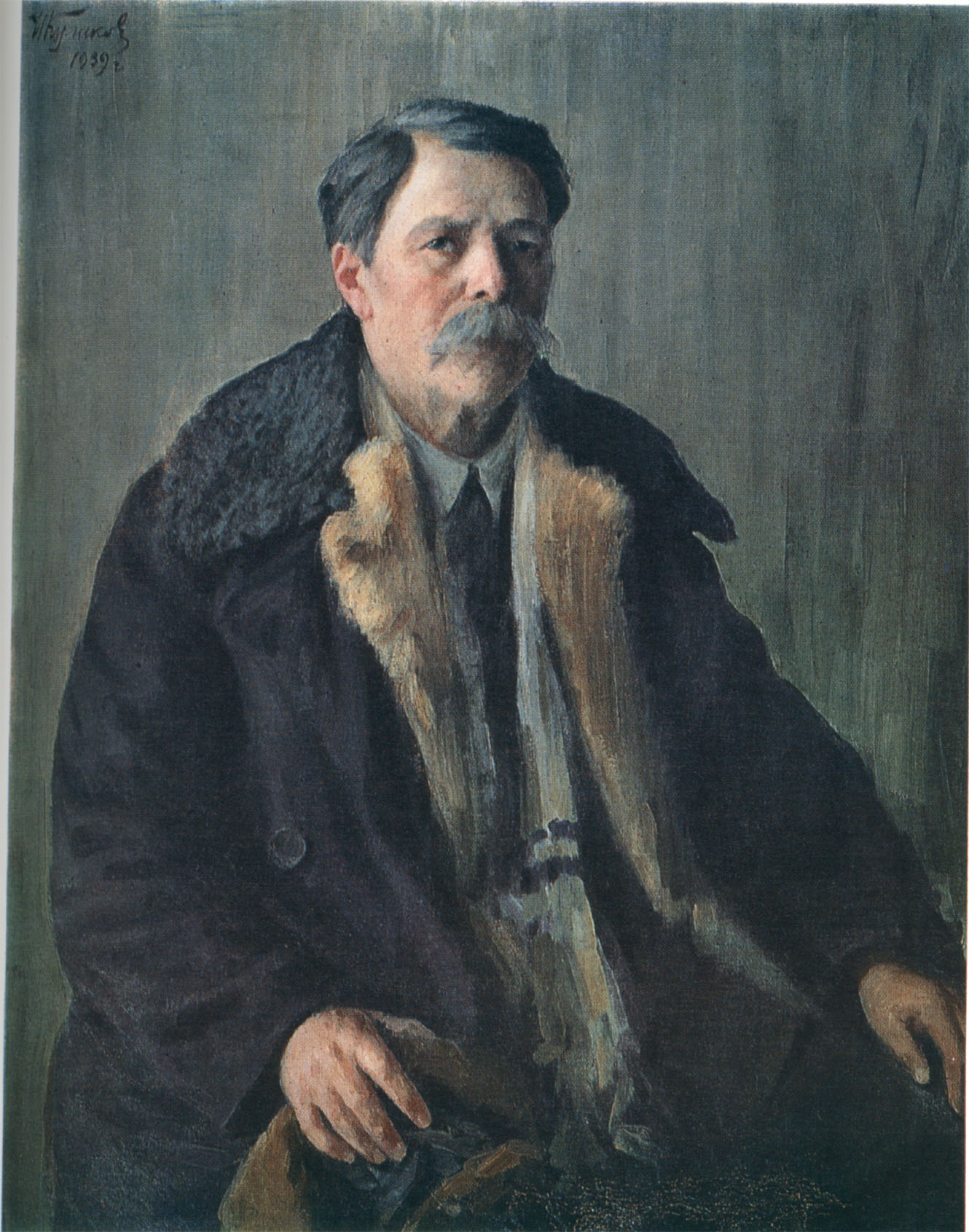
Self-portrait (1939)

Ivan Semyonovich Kulikov (Russian: Иван Семёнович Куликов; 13 April 1875 in Murom – 15 December 1941 in Murom) was a Russian painter, primarily of portraits and genre scenes.

== Biography ==
He was born to a peasant family that had recently moved to Murom from a rural village. His father was a roofer and house painter who headed a small cooperative that built and repaired numerous structures there.

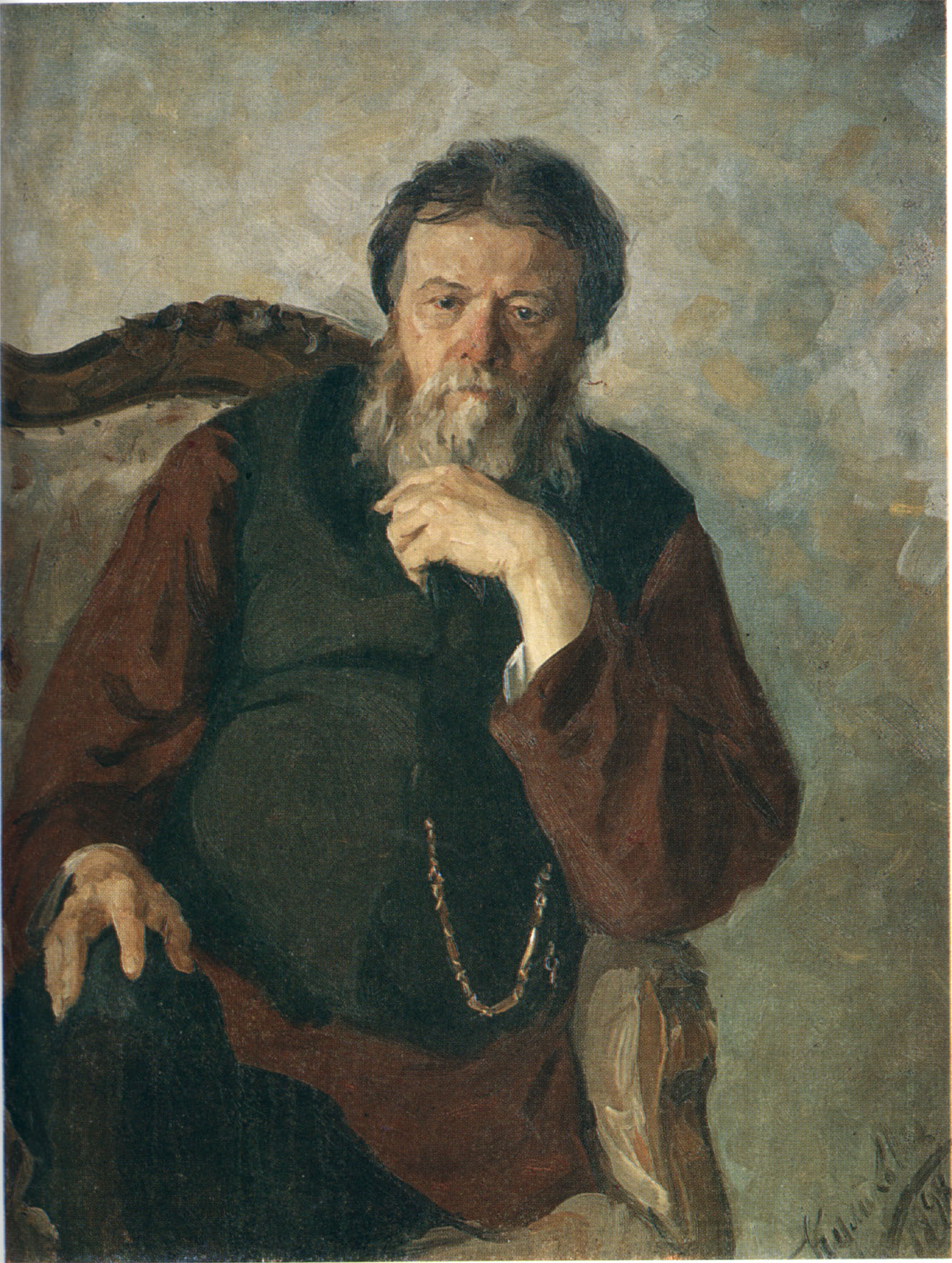
Portrait of his Father

In 1893, a local teacher became impressed with his drawing skills an introduced him to Alexander Morozov, who spent the summers painting in Murom. Morozov was impressed as well and advised his parents to enroll him in the drawing school at the Imperial Society for the Encouragement of the Arts.

He departed later that year, stopping in Moscow on the way to visit the Tretyakov Gallery and the Rumyantsev Museum.

When he arrived in Saint Petersburg, he took a position as an assistant in Morozov's studio. The following year, he enrolled at the drawing school, where his instructors included Aleksey Afanas'ev and Ernst Liphart. In 1896, he began auditing classes at the Imperial Academy of Arts; briefly with Vladimir Makovsky, then with Ilya Repin. In 1898, upon Repin's recommendation, he became a regular student there.

From 1901 to 1902, he and Boris Kustodiev helped Repin paint his monumental work (app.13 x 29 feet) "Ceremonial Sitting of the State Council on 7 May 1901 Marking the Centenary of its Foundation" for the Mariinsky Palace; providing sketches for most of the portraits. During that same period, he created illustrations for Twenty-six Men and a Girl and Konovalov, both by Maxim Gorky.

He graduated from the Academy in 1902 with a gold medal, the title of "Free Artist" and a stipend to study abroad. From 1903 to 1905, he used that stipend to visit Italy and France. When he returned, he won awards at several exhibitions, was offered employment as Director of the Kharkov art school in 1912 (although the offer was ultimately rejected) and was named an "Academician" in 1915.

In 1919, he helped to establish the "Murom History and Art Museum" and headed the art department for many years. In that capacity, he worked vigorously to collect, not only art objects, but documents, books and various historical relics from buildings that were abandoned or due to be demolished; as well as items that were looted during the war. Among the most notable things he saved was a collection of Paleolithic objects gathered by Aleksey Uvarov and left at his estate near Murom.

In 1932, he became a member of the Gorky branch of the USSR Union of Artists. In his later years, he created numerous canvases and drawings on military subjects. In 1947, following his wishes, his family opened a museum at his home. It was in operation until 2007, when the local authorities closed it and transferred the collection to the History and Art Museum.

== Selected paintings ==
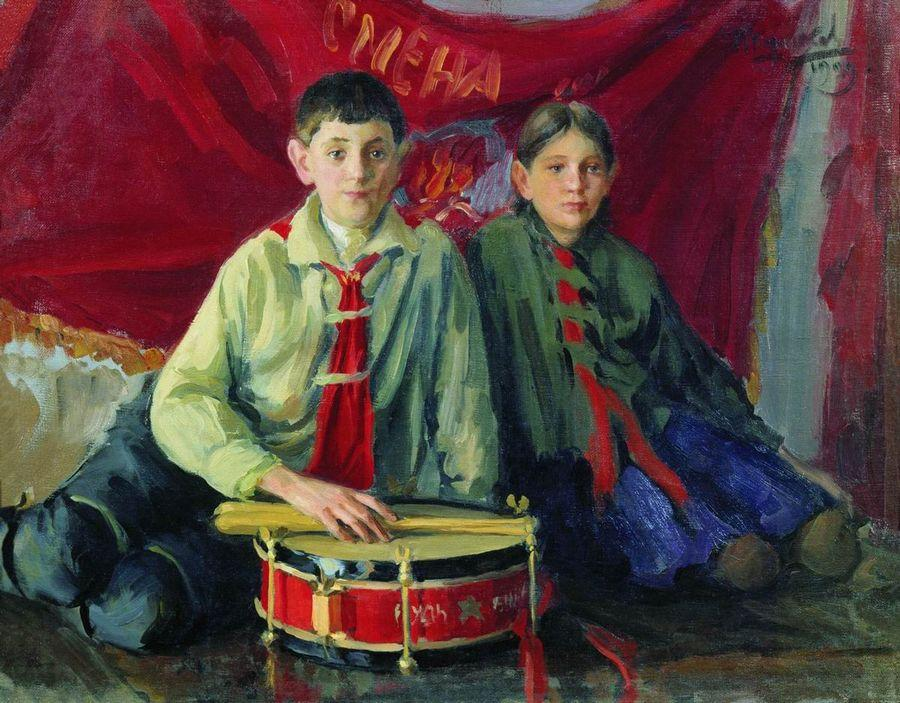
Young Pioneers

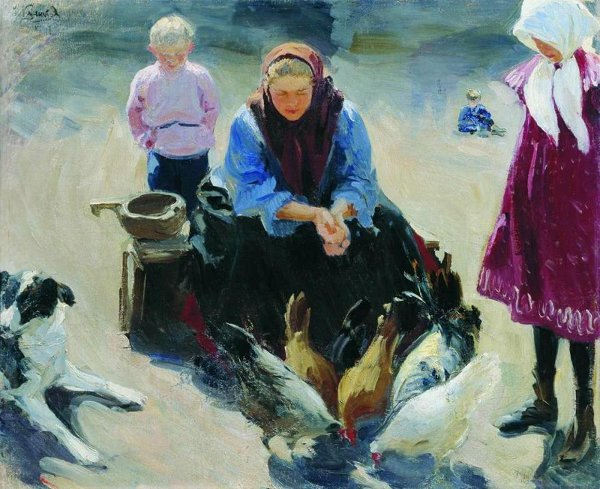
Feeding the Chickens

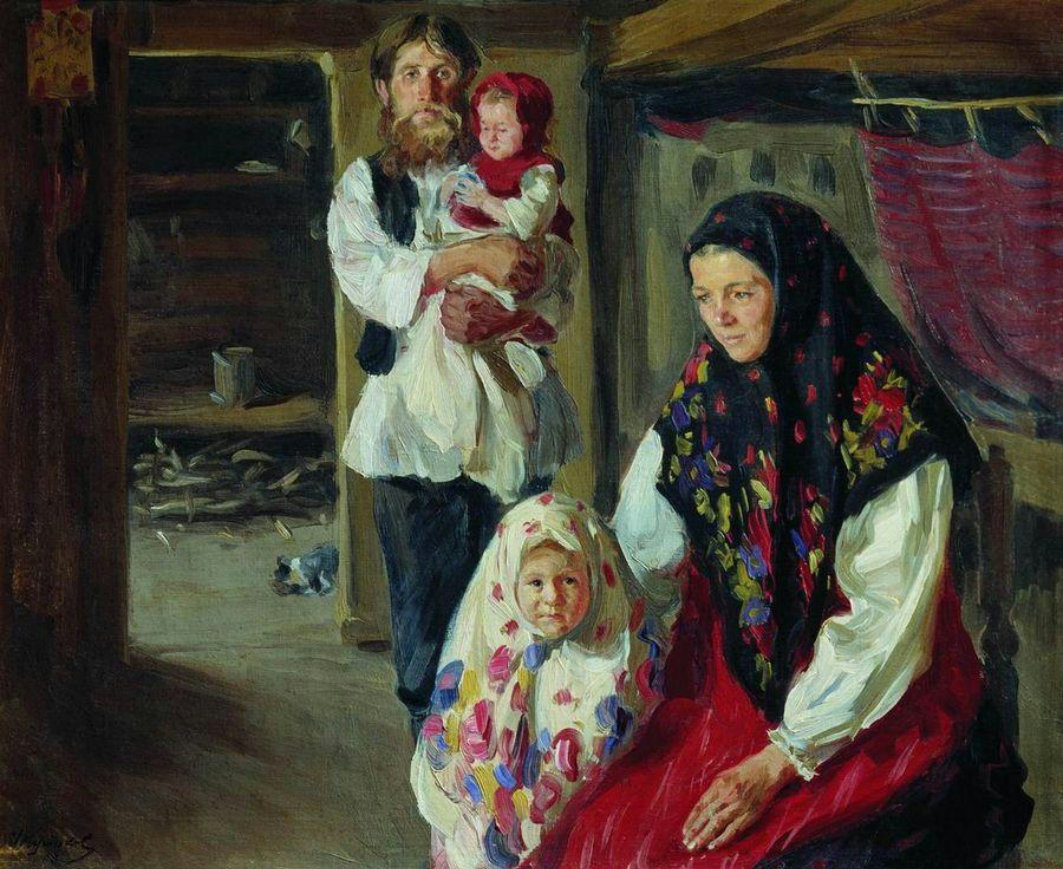
A Forester's Family

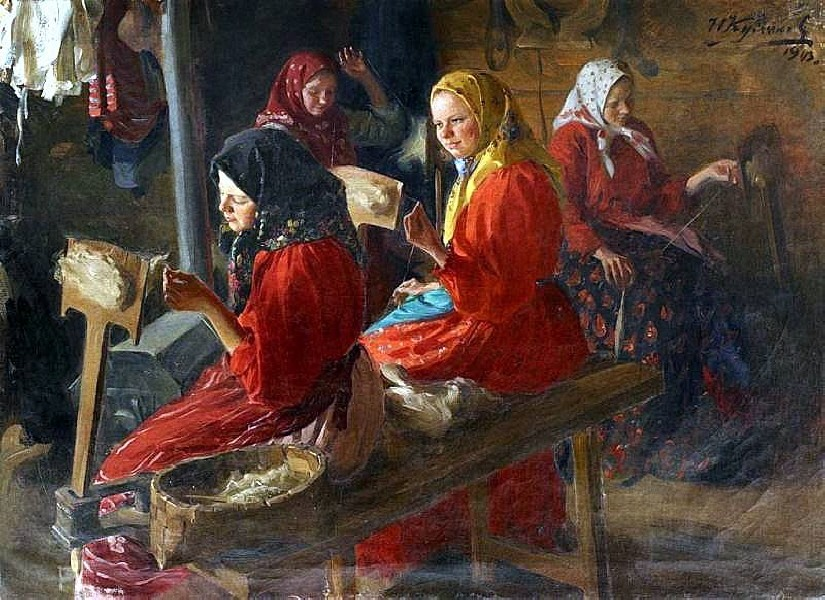
The Spinners
