= Ceremonial Sitting of the State Council on 7 May 1901 Marking the Centenary of its Foundation =

1903 painting by Ilya Repin

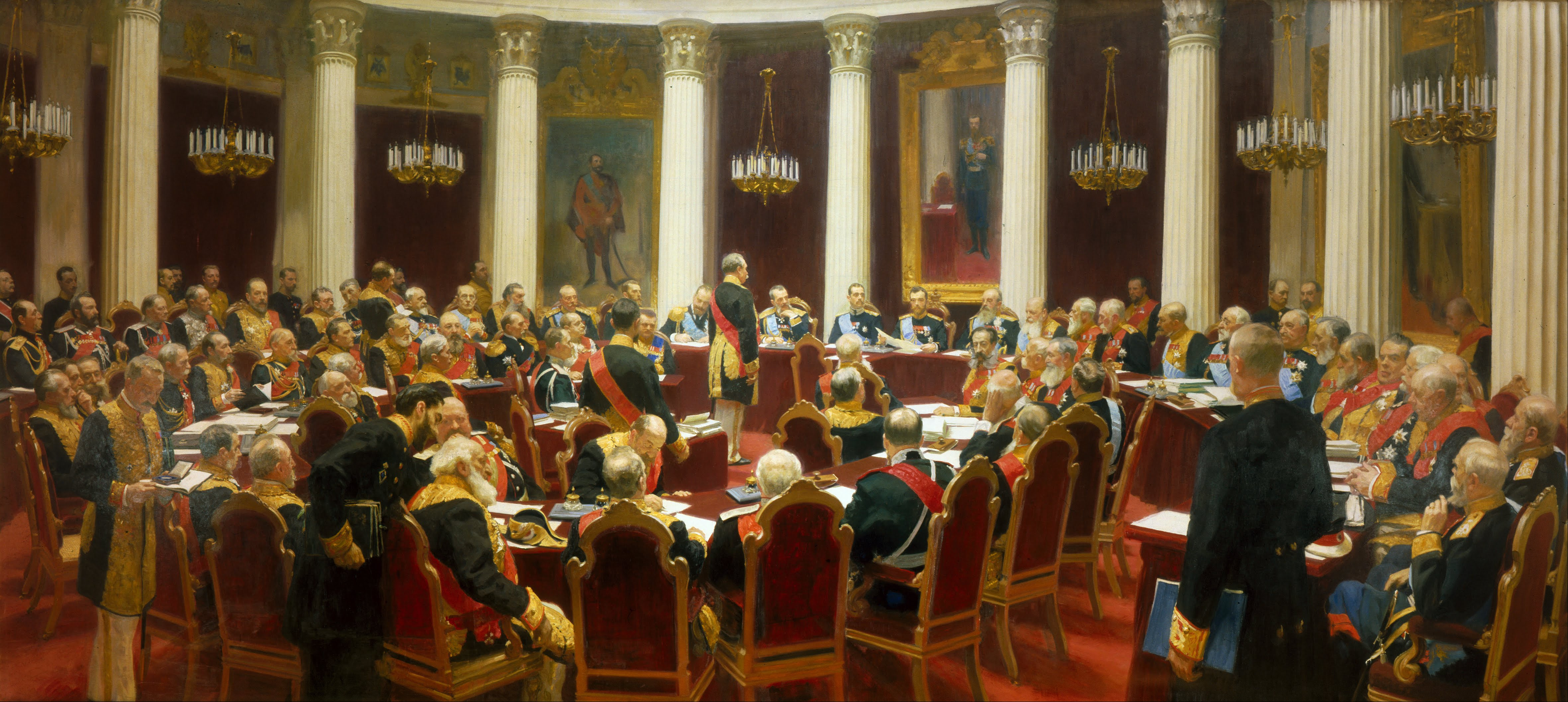
- Artist: Ilya Ripyn
- Year: 1903
- Medium: Oil on canvas
- Dimensions: 400 cm × 877 cm (160 in × 345 in)
- Location: State Russian Museum, Saint Petersburg

Ceremonial Sitting of the State Council on 7 May 1901 Marking the Centenary of its Foundation (Russian: Торжественное заседание Государственного совета 7 мая 1901 года в день столетнего юбилея со дня его учреждения) is an oil on canvas painting of 1903 by the artist Ilya Repin. The State Council (Russian Empire) had its centenary at the Mariinsky Palace marked by Ripyn's work. Ripyn quickly sketched while in the room, and later expanded this into the full painting with the aid of assistants Boris Kustodiev and Ivan Kulikov. The photorealism of the painting was noted in its time.

The painting is in the collection of the Russian Museum, Saint Petersburg.
