= SS Haimun =

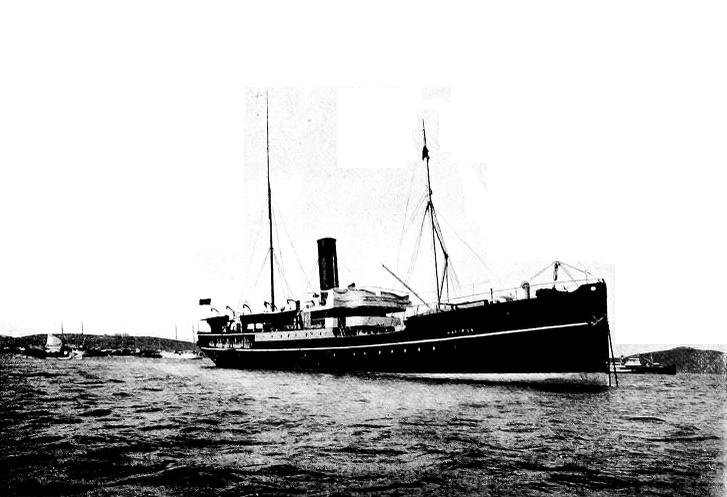
- SS Haimun at Anchor off Chinampo

General characteristics
- Type: Steamboat

SS Haimun was a Chinese steamer ship commanded by war correspondent Lionel James in 1904 during the Russo-Japanese War for The Times of London. It is the first-known instance of a "press boat" dedicated to war correspondence during naval battles.

The recent advent of wireless telegraphy meant that reporters were no longer limited to submitting their stories from land-based offices, and The Times spent 74 days outfitting and equipping the ship, installing a De Forest transmitter aboard the ship.

The ship sent its first news story on 15 March 1904.

While they covered naval manoeuvres in Port Arthur and the Gulf of Pechili, De Forest employee H. J. Brown was careful to only transmit their stories to the British-ruled Weihaiwei receiving office from the waters belonging to neutral countries, or within international waters. The receiving tower was manned by 21-year-old De Forest employee H. E. Ahearn.

Nevertheless, the ship's presence during wartime meant that it quickly aroused suspicion, and it was boarded and searched several times by Japanese ships, as well as being shot across the bow by the Russian warship Bayan.

On 15 April 1904, the Russian government announced its intentions to seize any ships owned by neutral countries that had the radio equipment that could potentially give away their military positions to enemies, a thinly veiled threat against Haimun. Lord Lansdowne quickly dismissed the Russian announcement as "unjustifiable and altogether absurd".

In the end, faced with the prospect of Russian charges of espionage as well as Japanese indignation at not having been foretold about the receiving station constructed without their permission, James dismantled and abandoned the boat, from which he had sent 10,000 words of copy, and continued his war correspondence the traditional way through Weihaiwei.
