= Dmitry Sipyagin =

Russian politician (1853–1902)

- Дмитрий Сипягин
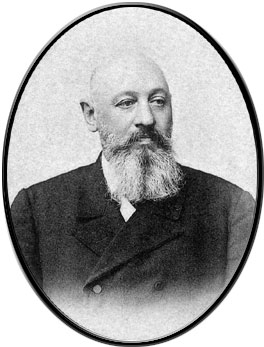

Minister of Interior of the Russian Empire
- In office 20 October 1899 – 2 April 1902
- Monarch: Nicholas II
- Preceded by: Ivan Goremykin
- Succeeded by: Vyacheslav von Plehve

Governor of Moscow
- In office 20 December 1891 – 31 May 1893
- Preceded by: Vladimir Golitsyn
- Succeeded by: Alexander Bulygin

Governor of Courland
- In office 31 March 1888 – 20 December 1891
- Preceded by: Konstantin Pahschenko
- Succeeded by: Dmitry Sverbeyev

Personal details
- Born: Dmitry Sergeyevich Sipyagin; 20 March 1853 Kiev, Kiev Governorate, Russian Empire
- Died: 2 April 1902 (aged 49) Mariinsky Palace, Saint Petersburg, Russian Empire

Dmitry Sergeyevich Sipyagin (Russian: Дми́трий Серге́евич Сипя́гин; 20 March [O.S. 8 March] 1853 – 15 April [O.S. 2 April] 1902) was a Russian politician.

== Career ==
Born in Kiev, Sipyagin graduated from the Judicial Department of St Petersburg University in 1876. Served in the MVD as Vice Governor of Kharkov Governorate (1886–1888), Governor of Courland Governorate (1888–1891) and Governor of Moscow Governorate (1891–1893). Deputy of the Minister of State Property (1893); Deputy of the Minister of Interior (1894); Executive Director on the petitions of the Imperial Chancellery (1895–1899); Director of the Ministry of Interior (1899); Minister of Interior (1899).

In 1899, during the Russian Student Strike, the government had given Sipyagin "the power of imposing military service as a punishment for acts of civil disobedience towards the University authorities, and themselves to appoint special committees, or rather Courts nominated ad hoc..." He remained the interior minister from 20 October 1899 to 2 April 1902.

== Death ==
Sipyagin was assassinated in the Mariinsky Palace by Socialist-Revolutionary Stepan Balmashov. His death was a severe setback to Sergei Witte, the finance minister, who had been supported by Sipyagin but would be challenged by his successor, Vyacheslav von Plehve.

== Honours ==
Sipyagin received the Order of Saint Vladimir as an Imperial favour for the New Year 1900, shortly after accepting the position as Minister.

Political offices
Preceded by Ivan Goremykin	Minister of Interior; 1899–1902	Succeeded by Vyacheslav von Plehve
