= Stepan Balmashov =

Russian student and SR who assassinated Interior Minister Dmitry Sipyagin in 1902

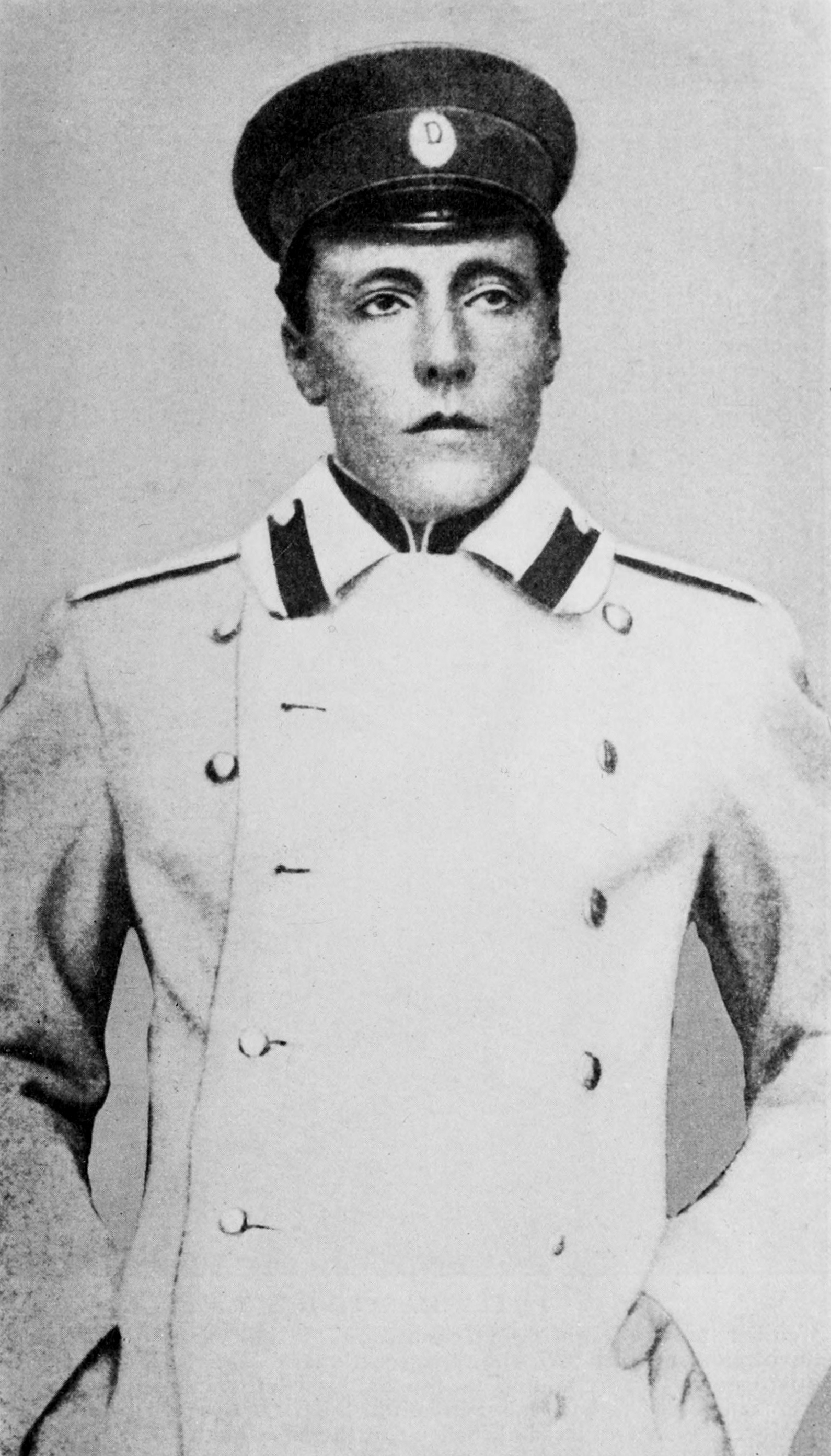
Stepan Balmashov

Stepan Valerianovich Balmashov (Russian: Степа́н Валериа́нович Балмашёв, April 15, 1881 – May 16, 1902) was a Russian student, who assassinated the Minister of Internal Affairs Dmitry Sipyagin in April 1902 in the Mariinsky Palace in Saint Petersburg. He was hanged in the fortress of Schlisselburg in May 1902, aged 21.

== University life ==
Balmashov was born in Arkhangelsk, into a political family. His parents were Narodniks who had been sent into administrative exile in Arkhangelsk. In 1900, he entered the Kiev Imperial University and immediately became involved in the student movement, which was undergoing a revival. The government's response to student unrest was to issue a decree ordering 183 students to surrender to the army. In January 1901, Balmashov was arrested as one of the leaders of the disturbances, and spent three months in prison. After his release, he was confined to Roslavl in Smolensk province, under military supervision. In Autumn 1901, after a change in government policy, he was released from military supervision and moved to Kharkiv, where he attempted to gain entry to the university, but was barred because of his 'unreliability'. During a month in Kharkiv, he made contact with revolutionaries, and became actively involved in both Marxist and populist circles, explaining that he did not see any significant differences between the Social Democrats and the Narodniks. Returning to Kiev, he was readmitted to university, despite his past record. However, there was soon another outbreak of student disturbances, followed by a crackdown and mass deportation of students to Siberia, for which Balmashov blamed the Minister, Sipyagin.

== Assassination of Sipyagin ==
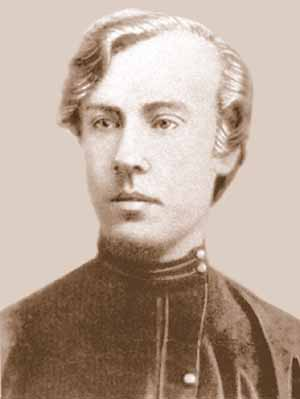

In 1902, several Narodnik groups merged to form the Socialist Revolutionary Party, which included the SR Combat Organization headed by Grigory Gershuni, charged with assassinating government officials. Gershuni decided that Sipyagin would be their first target, and Balmashov volunteered to be the assassin. On April 15, 1902 (April 2 Old Style), Balmashov arrived disguised as an employee to the Mariinsky Palace, where Sipyagin was supposed to be. However, the minister had not yet arrived. Balmashov returned somewhat later and told the doorman that he had some documents from the Grand Duke Sergei Alexandrovich. When Sipygan arrived, Balmashov positioned himself behind the minister and shot him several times, leaving him with serious injuries that resulted in his death an hour later.

== Investigation, trial, and execution ==
During his questioning, Balmashov stated that, "the method of combating a terrorist seems to me inhumane and cruel, but it's inevitable with the current regime", and refused to say anything else. A military tribunal sentenced him to death by hanging. Even though various people recommended that he request a pardon, none was given. The execution took place in the fortress of Shlisselburg in May 1902.
