= Bookman list of bestselling novels in the United States in the 1900s =

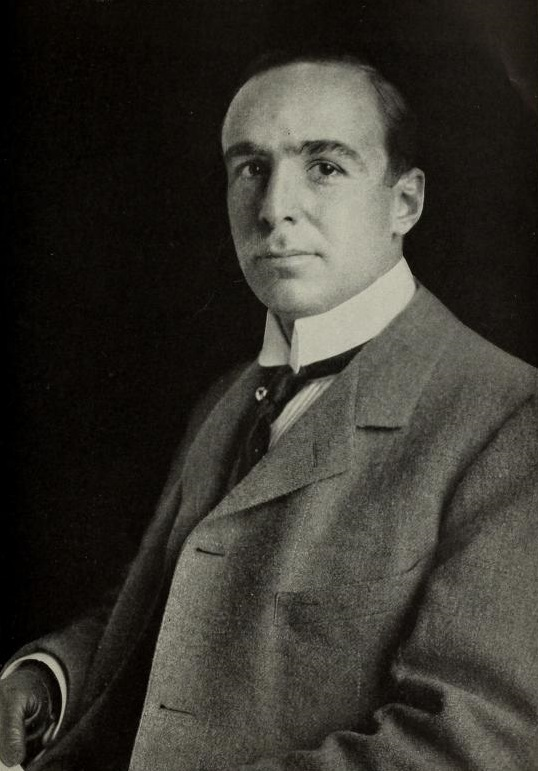
4 out of 10 best-selling American books in the 1900s were written by Winston Churchill (1871 – 1947)

This is a list of bestselling novels in the United States in the 1900s, as determined by The Bookman, a New York–based literary journal. The list features the most popular novels of each year from 1900 through 1909.

The standards set for inclusion in the lists – which, for example, led to the exclusion of the novels in the Harry Potter series from the lists for the 1990s and 2000s – are currently unknown.

== 1900 ==
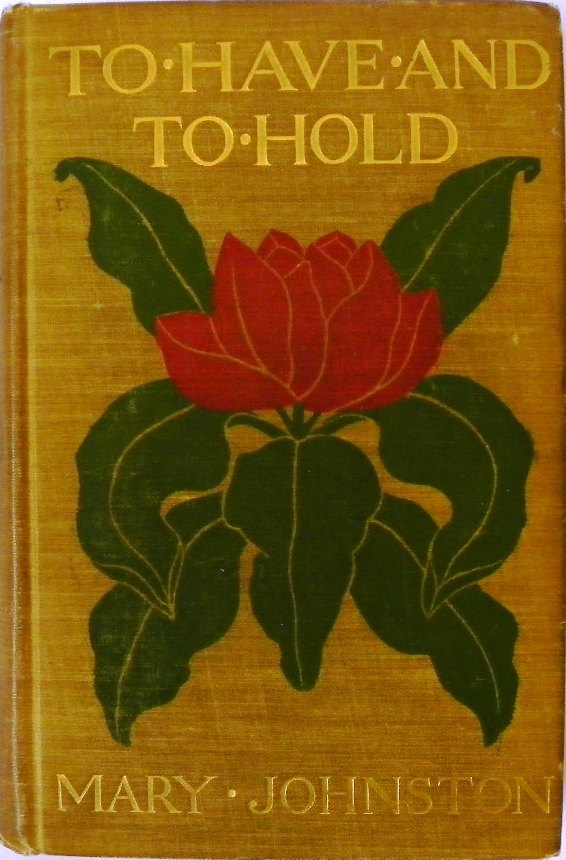
To Have and to Hold

1. To Have and to Hold by Mary Johnston
2. Red Pottage by Mary Cholmondeley
3. Unleavened Bread by Robert Grant
4. The Reign of Law by James Lane Allen
5. Eben Holden by Irving Bacheller
6. Janice Meredith by Paul Leicester Ford
7. The Redemption of David Corson by Charles Frederic Goss
8. Richard Carvel by Winston Churchill
9. When Knighthood Was in Flower by Charles Major
10. Alice of Old Vincennes by Maurice Thompson

== 1901 ==
1. The Crisis by Winston Churchill
2. Alice of Old Vincennes by Maurice Thompson
3. The Helmet of Navarre by Bertha Runkle
4. The Right of Way by Gilbert Parker
5. Eben Holden by Irving Bacheller
6. The Visits of Elizabeth by Elinor Glyn
7. The Puppet Crown by Harold MacGrath
8. The Life and Death of Richard Yea-and-Nay by Maurice Hewlett
9. Graustark by George Barr McCutcheon
10. D'ri and I by Irving Bacheller

== 1902 ==
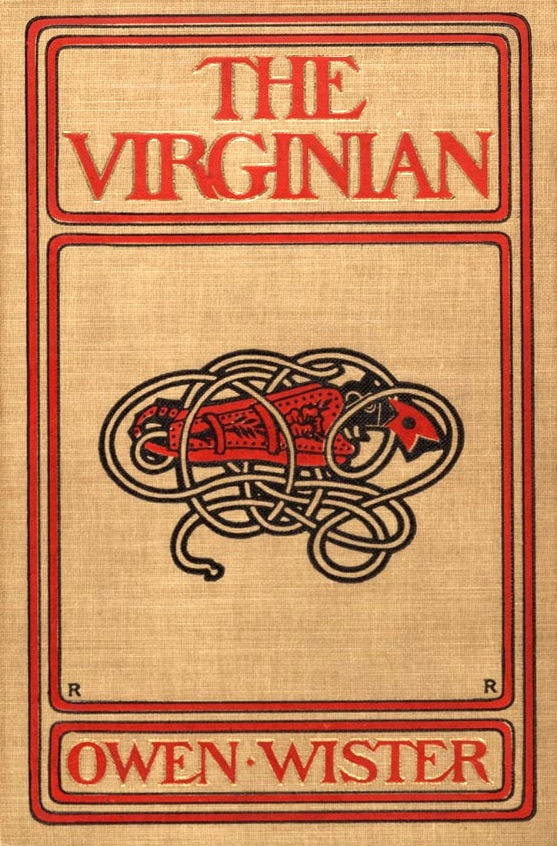
The Virginian

1. The Virginian by Owen Wister
2. Mrs. Wiggs of the Cabbage Patch by Alice Caldwell Hegan (Alice Hegan Rice)
3. Dorothy Vernon of Haddon Hall by Charles Major
4. The Mississippi Bubble by Emerson Hough
5. Audrey by Mary Johnston
6. The Right of Way by Gilbert Parker
7. The Hound of the Baskervilles by Arthur Conan Doyle
8. The Two Vanrevels by Booth Tarkington
9. The Blue Flower by Henry van Dyke
10. Sir Richard Calmady by Lucas Malet

== 1903 ==
1. Lady Rose's Daughter by Mary Augusta Ward
2. Gordon Keith by Thomas Nelson Page
3. The Pit by Frank Norris
4. Lovey Mary by Alice Hegan Rice
5. The Virginian by Owen Wister
6. Mrs. Wiggs of the Cabbage Patch by Alice Hegan Rice
7. The Mettle of the Pasture by James Lane Allen
8. Letters of a Self-Made Merchant to His Son by George Horace Lorimer
9. The One Woman by Thomas Dixon, Jr.
10. The Little Shepherd of Kingdom Come by John Fox, Jr.

== 1904 ==
1. The Crossing by Winston Churchill
2. The Deliverance by Ellen Glasgow
3. The Masquerader by Katherine Cecil Thurston
4. In the Bishop's Carriage by Miriam Michelson
5. Sir Mortimer by Mary Johnston
6. Beverly of Graustark by George Barr McCutcheon
7. The Little Shepherd of Kingdom Come by John Fox, Jr.
8. Rebecca of Sunnybrook Farm by Kate Douglas Wiggin
9. My Friend Prospero by Henry Harland
10. The Silent Places by Stewart Edward White

== 1905 ==
1. The Marriage of William Ashe by Mary Augusta Ward
2. Sandy by Alice Hegan Rice
3. The Garden of Allah by Robert Hichens
4. The Clansman by Thomas Dixon, Jr.
5. Nedra by George Barr McCutcheon
6. The Gambler by Katherine Cecil Thurston
7. The Masquerader by Katherine Cecil Thurston
8. The House of Mirth by Edith Wharton
9. The Princess Passes by C. N. Williamson and A. M. Williamson
10. Rose o' the River by Kate Douglas Wiggin

== 1906 ==
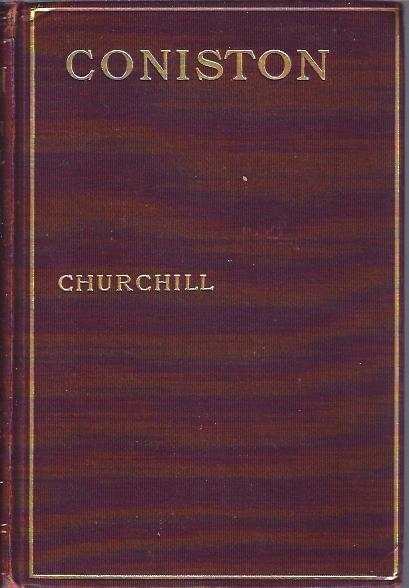
Coniston

1. Coniston by Winston Churchill
2. Lady Baltimore by Owen Wister
3. The Fighting Chance by Robert W. Chambers
4. The House of a Thousand Candles by Meredith Nicholson
5. Jane Cable by George Barr McCutcheon
6. The Jungle by Upton Sinclair
7. The Awakening of Helena Richie by Margaret Deland
8. The Spoilers by Rex Beach
9. The House of Mirth by Edith Wharton
10. The Wheel of Life by Ellen Glasgow

== 1907 ==
1. The Lady of the Decoration by Frances Little
2. The Weavers by Gilbert Parker
3. The Port of Missing Men by Meredith Nicholson
4. The Shuttle by Frances Hodgson Burnett
5. The Brass Bowl by Louis Joseph Vance
6. Satan Sanderson by Hallie Erminie Rives
7. The Daughter of Anderson Crow by George Barr McCutcheon
8. The Younger Set by Robert W. Chambers
9. The Doctor by Ralph Connor
10. Half a Rogue by Harold MacGrath

== 1908 ==
1. Mr. Crewe's Career by Winston Churchill
2. The Barrier by Rex Beach
3. The Trail of the Lonesome Pine by John Fox, Jr.
4. The Lure of the Mask by Harold MacGrath
5. The Shuttle by Frances Hodgson Burnett
6. Peter by F. Hopkinson Smith
7. Lewis Rand by Mary Johnston
8. The Black Bag by Louis Joseph Vance
9. The Man from Brodney's by George Barr McCutcheon
10. The Weavers by Gilbert Parker

== 1909 ==
1. The Inner Shrine by Anonymous (Basil King)
2. Katrine by Elinor Macartney Lane
3. The Silver Horde by Rex Beach
4. The Man in Lower Ten by Mary Roberts Rinehart
5. The Trail of the Lonesome Pine by John Fox, Jr.
6. Truxton King by George Barr McCutcheon
7. 54-40 or Fight by Emerson Hough
8. The Goose Girl by Harold MacGrath
9. Peter by F. Hopkinson Smith
10. Septimus by William J. Locke
