= The Shuttle =

The Shuttle may refer to:

- The Shuttle (bus), a free bus in Christchurch, New Zealand
- The Shuttle (film), a 1918 American silent film
- The Shuttle (newspaper), a free weekly in Worcestershire, England
- The Shuttle (novel), a 1907 novel by Frances Hodgson Burnett

== See also ==
- Shuttle (disambiguation)
