= Edward Everett Rose =

American dramatist (1862-1939)

Edward Everett Rose (February 11, 1862 - April 2, 1939) was an American playwright. He adapted a number of popular novels into plays, including Janice Meredith, Richard Carvel, David Harum, Eben Holden, The Battle of the Strong, Alice of Old Vincennes, and The Rosary.

== Life ==
Rose was born in Stanstead, Canada East and graduated from Chauncy Hall School in Boston in 1881, and studied for two years at Harvard University. He died in Fremont, Wisconsin on April 2, 1939, survived by his wife, actress Dorothy Stanton and his daughter Ruth Rose, who became an actress and screenwriter.

== Works ==
Two of his early plays which drew some attention were The Westerner for Al. Lipmann and Captain Paul for Robert C. Hilliard in the mid-1890s. He also was a stage director for some Charles Frohman productions.

His numerous adaptions of best-selling novels into plays starting around 1900 to capitalize on their success were not necessarily intended to be productions of high quality. In response to his adaption of Alice of Old Vincennes in 1901, for example, it was said that "the mills of Edward E. Rose, dramatizer, are not like those of the famous proverb, for they grind rapidly and not exceeding fine." Ethel Voynich was so unimpressed with his version of her novel The Gadfly that she tried to take out an injunction against the "illiterate melodrama" as she called it.

His adaptation of a Richard Washburn Child story into the 1919 production The Master Thief was intended as satire of the melodramas which were popular in the early part of the 20th century.

== Legacy ==
As his New York Times obituary pointed out, he should not be confused with British playwright Edward Rose (1849–1904), who dramatized The Prisoner of Zenda. Edward Everett typically marketed himself under the name "Edward E. Rose", unlike the British writer.

The Rue Edward Rose or Rose Street in Sherbrooke, Quebec is named for him.
