= Iroquois War =

1609 war in New York state

- Part of the Beaver Wars
Date	early 17th century
Location	Northern New York
Result	French and Algonquin victory

Belligerents
Haudenosaunee	France; Algonquins, Innu, Wendat (Huron)

Commanders and leaders
Unknown	Samuel de Champlain, Iroquet and Ochateguin (Algonquins and Wendat)

Strength
Between 200 and 300 warriors, three war chiefs or “captains”	Between 60 and 100 warriors, formerly 300 who turned back 3 French arquebusiers, formerly 9

Casualties and losses
Between 50 and 100 killed, 12 taken prisoner and tortured	Unknown, but no more than 20

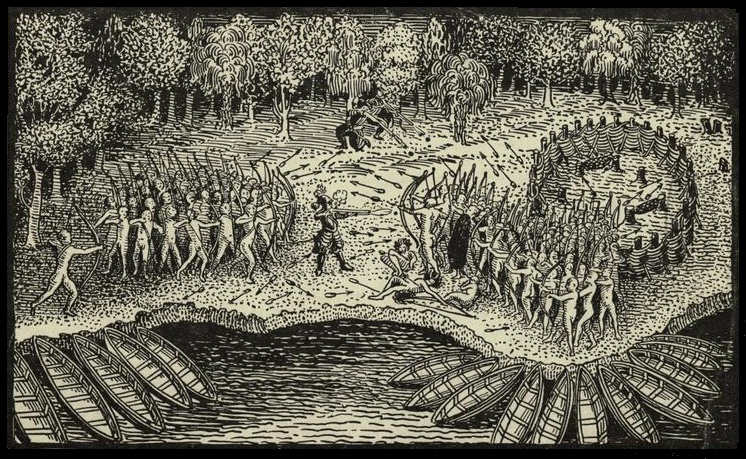
Engraving based on a drawing by Champlain of his 1609 voyage. It depicts a battle between Haudenosaunee (Iroquois) and Algonquian tribes near Lake Champlain

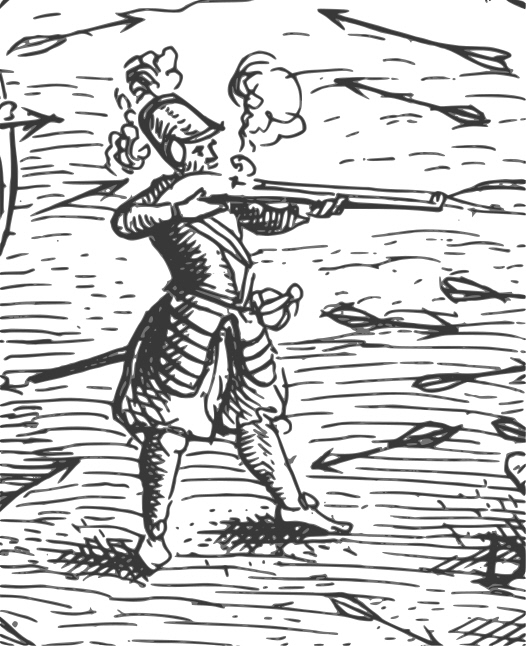
Enlarged detail from the center of the engraving "Deffaite des Yroquois au Lac de Champlain," from Champlain's Voyages (1613). This is the only contemporary likeness of the explorer to survive to the present. It is also a self-portrait.

The Iroquois War was fought in the early 17th century in the North Country of modern New York state. It was attested to by early explorers of New France.

During the summer of 1609, Samuel de Champlain attempted to form better relations with the local native tribes. He made alliances with the Wendat (called Huron by the French) and with the Algonquin, the Innu people (Montagnais), and the Etchemin, who lived in the area of the St. Lawrence River. These tribes demanded that Champlain help them in their war against the Haudenosaunee (Iroquois), who lived further south. Champlain set off with 9 French soldiers and 300 natives to explore the Rivière des Iroquois (now known as the Richelieu River), and became the first European to map Lake Champlain. Having had no encounters with the Haudenosaunee at this point many of the men headed back because of the danger of traveling in the country of their enemies, leaving Champlain with only 2 Frenchmen and 60 natives.

On July 29, somewhere on the western shore of what is now Lake Champlain and most likely near the site that would become Fort Ticonderoga, Champlain and his party encountered a group of Haudenosaunee. A battle began the next day. Two hundred Haudenosaunee advanced on Champlain's position, and one of his guides pointed out the three Haudenosaunee war chiefs. Champlain fired his arquebus, killing two of the men with a single shot, and one of his men killed the third man. The Haudenosaunee turned and fled after both sides fired arrows, as the Wendat (Huron) and Algonquins routed the enemy, killing fifty and taking twelve prisoners.
