= Linsly R. Williams =

American physician (1875–1934)

Linsly R. Williams (January 28, 1875 - January 8, 1934) was a physician who served as director of the New York Academy of Medicine, and president of the New York Tuberculosis and Health Association.

He was born on January 28, 1875, in New York, to John Stanton Williams and Mary Maclay Pentz Williams. He attended Princeton University, graduating in 1895, and then Columbia University, where he took an MA in 1899 and his medical degree from Columbia's medical school. He interned at Presbyterian Hospital and Sloane Maternity Hospital, and then became chief of the medical department of the Vanderbilt Clinic in 1902, also starting his own practice that year. He taught at Columbia from 1902, initially as an instructor in histology.

He was State Deputy Health Commissioner from 1914 to 1917, and was offered the post of State Health Commissioner in 1930 by Governor Roosevelt, but turned it down. He was a first lieutenant in the Medical Reserve Corps from 1917, visiting France, and soon was promoted to Major and then to Lieutenant Colonel in the Medical Corps. He left the army in 1919.

For the next three years he ran the Rockefeller Foundation's efforts to reduce tuberculosis in France. In 1922 he left France for the post of managing director of the National Tuberculosis Association in New York, staying there until 1928, and being appointed the first director of the New York Academy of Medicine in 1924.

He was awarded the Legion of Honor (France), and was made a Knight of Dannebrog by Denmark. His wife was Grace Kidder Ford, the widow of the novelist Paul Leicester Ford; Williams had saved the life of Grace's daughter Lesta. They had three children.
