= Shuttle =

The original meaning of the word shuttle is the device used in weaving to carry the weft. By reference to the continual to-and-fro motion associated with that, the term was then applied in transportation and then in other spheres. Thus the word may now also refer to:

== Transport ==
=== Air transport ===
- Air shuttle, a type of flight which quickly connects nearby destinations
- Delta Shuttle, the brand name for Delta Air Lines' air shuttle service
- Rossi Shuttle Quik, an Italian ultralight trike design
- Shuttle America, a regional airline based in Indianapolis, Indiana
- Shuttle by United, a regional airline operated as a subsidiary of United Airlines
- Shuttle Carrier Aircraft, modified Boeing 747 airliners used to transport Space Shuttle orbiters
- US Airways Shuttle, the brand name for an hourly service offered by US Airways
- The call sign for domestic (UK internal) British Airways flights - international flights use Speedbird

=== Land transport ===
==== Automotive brands ====
- Fit Shuttle, the station wagon version of Honda Fit
- Honda Shuttle, the first generation Honda Odyssey

==== Mass transit ====
Transport systems operating at frequent intervals on a short, (mostly) non-stop route between two places

- Shuttle bus service
- Shuttle train service
  - Car shuttle train
    - LeShuttle, the car-carrying trains used in the Channel Tunnel
  - S (New York City Subway service), three shuttle train routes
    - 42nd Street Shuttle, shuttle train between Grand Central and Port Authority
    - Franklin Avenue Shuttle
    - Rockaway Park Shuttle
  - Amtrak Hartford Line, formerly named the New Haven–Springfield Shuttle
- Shuttle van, a New Zealand term for shared taxis

=== Spacecraft ===
- Shuttle (spacecraft type), a smaller spacecraft used for ship-to-ship and ship-to-ground transport in theory and science fiction
- Space Shuttle, the vehicle for the NASA Space Shuttle program from 1981 to 2011
  - Space Shuttle orbiter, a space plane, the crewed part of the Space Shuttle
- Buran Shuttle, the vehicle for the Soviet Buran programme

== Arts, entertainment, and media ==
- Shuttle (film), a 2008 thriller film
- Shuttle (video game), a video game produced by Virgin
- Shuttling (patience term), a method of play in patience and solitaire games

== Sciences and technology ==
- Molecular shuttles, a molecule capable of nano scale transportation
- Multi-project wafer service (|MPW) shuttle, an integrated circuit production run for multi-chip or multi-project wafers
- Shuttle bombing, a World War II strategic bombing tactic
- Shuttle diplomacy, an international relations tactic
- Shuttle vector, vector that shuttles between species, biochemistry, genetics

== Sports ==
- 20-yard shuttle, a test performed by American football players
- Shuttlecock or birdie, the object batted back and forth in badminton

== Other uses ==
- Shuttle (weaving), used by weavers at a textile mill or on a loom
- Shuttle Inc., a manufacturer of small form-factor computers
- Shuttle trading, a form of goods distribution
- River Shuttle, a river of southeast London in England
- USS Shuttle (SP-3572), a United States Navy patrol vessel in commission from 1918 to 1919
- Shuttle, school bullying in South Korea

== See also ==
- The Shuttle (disambiguation)
