= The Ship of Souls =

The Ship of Souls was a 1925 western novel by Emerson Hough, published after his death. It included 16 illustrations by WHD Koerner. It was made into a 1925 silent 3-D film of the same name, The Ship of Souls.

== Plot summary ==
After being deserted by his wife, rancher Langley Barnes seeks peace by retreating to the remote “North Country.” There he meets and falls in love with Christine Garth, the daughter of a factor driven mad by isolation. Despite not yet being legally divorced, Barnes and Christine enter into an unofficial marriage. Later, a man named Captain Churchill arrives to build a radio transmitter; he returns to the U.S., marries Barnes’s estranged wife (now divorced), and then sends word by radio back to the North Country, alerting Barnes that his previous marriage is dissolved. Freed legally, Barnes and Christine formally remarry, allowing them to be together without social or legal scandal.
