= Elinor Macartney Lane =

American novelist (1864–1909)

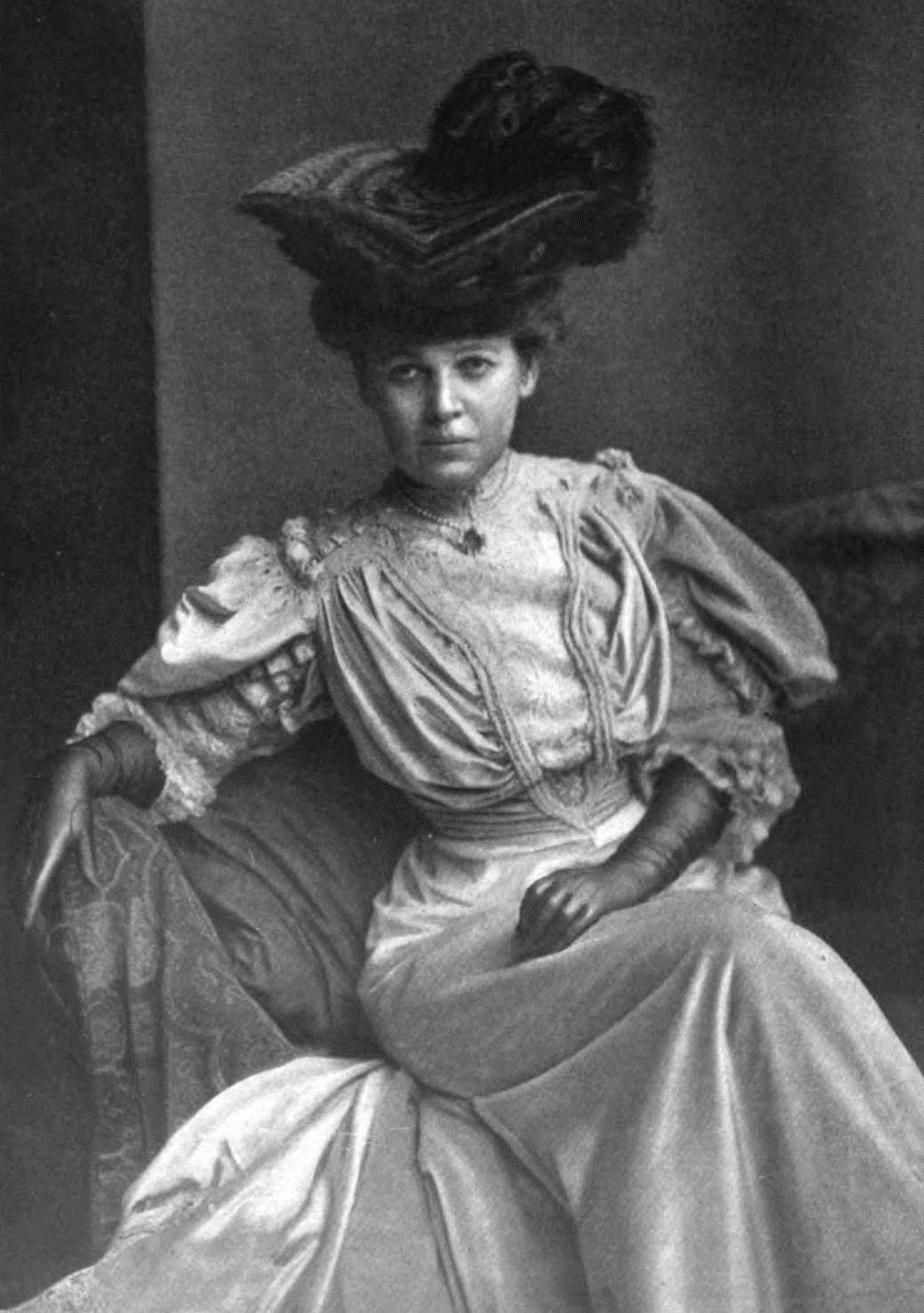
- Born: Elinor Macartney; 1864; Maryland, U.S.
- Died: March 15, 1909 (aged 44–45); Lynchburg, Virginia, U.S.
- Occupation: Writer
- Spouse: Francis Ransom Lane (m. 1891)

Elinor Macartney Lane (1864 – March 15, 1909) was an American novelist who was popular in the first decade of the 1900s. After publishing a number of short stories, she wrote three novels: Mills of God (1901), Nancy Stair (1904), and Katrine (1909).

== Biography ==
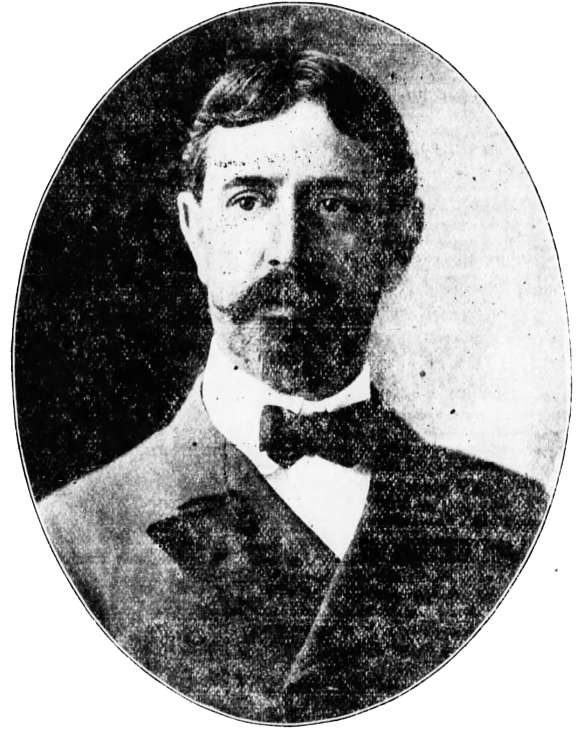
Francis Ransom Lane in 1906 newspaper

Elinor Macartney was born in 1864 in southern Maryland as the youngest daughter of Elizabeth (née Mearns) and Nicholas Macartney. She later moved to Washington, D.C., where she attended high school and normal school, from which she graduated in 1882. She then taught in the public schools, specializing in mathematics. She married educator Francis Ransom Lane in 1891. She started writing at age 16, when she also started an occasionally published magazine called The Trifler. Her first novel Mills of God was published in 1901.

Although it did not reach The Bookman 's Top 10 bestselling books list for the whole year of 1904, Nancy Stair was a best-selling book and received well by critics. It was adapted for the stage in 1905 by Paul M. Potter, who was best known for his hit play Trilby, an adaptation of the very popular 1894 novel. It played on Broadway at the Criterion Theatre for a month in 1905, though it was not a success. It was also adapted as a play by the American Catherine Chisholm Cushing for performance in Los Angeles, and New Zealand playwright Violet Targuse.

Lane's last novel, Katrine, was released almost coincident with her death in March 1909. It was the second-best selling novel in the United States for 1909.

== Illness and death ==
After returning home from a trip to Europe, Lane died at a hotel in Lynchburg, Virginia, on March 15, 1909, while travelling to Asheville, North Carolina, to recuperate from illness. Her home was at that time in Port Deposit, Maryland, where her husband was director of the Tome School. According to a report in the Book News Monthly after her death, she had been ill for some years and her death was not wholly unexpected. She reportedly had to write in an "absolutely dark room, with her head tightly bandaged, her writing managed only by a careful guiding of her pencil over the paper."

== Bibliography ==
- Mills of God (1901)
- Nancy Stair (1904)
- All for the Love of a Lady (novelette) (1906) (87 pgs.) (first published in Appleton's Magazine)
- Katrine (1909)
- The Apple-Tree Cottage (novelette) (1910) (52 pgs.)
