= The Ship of Souls (film) =

1925 film

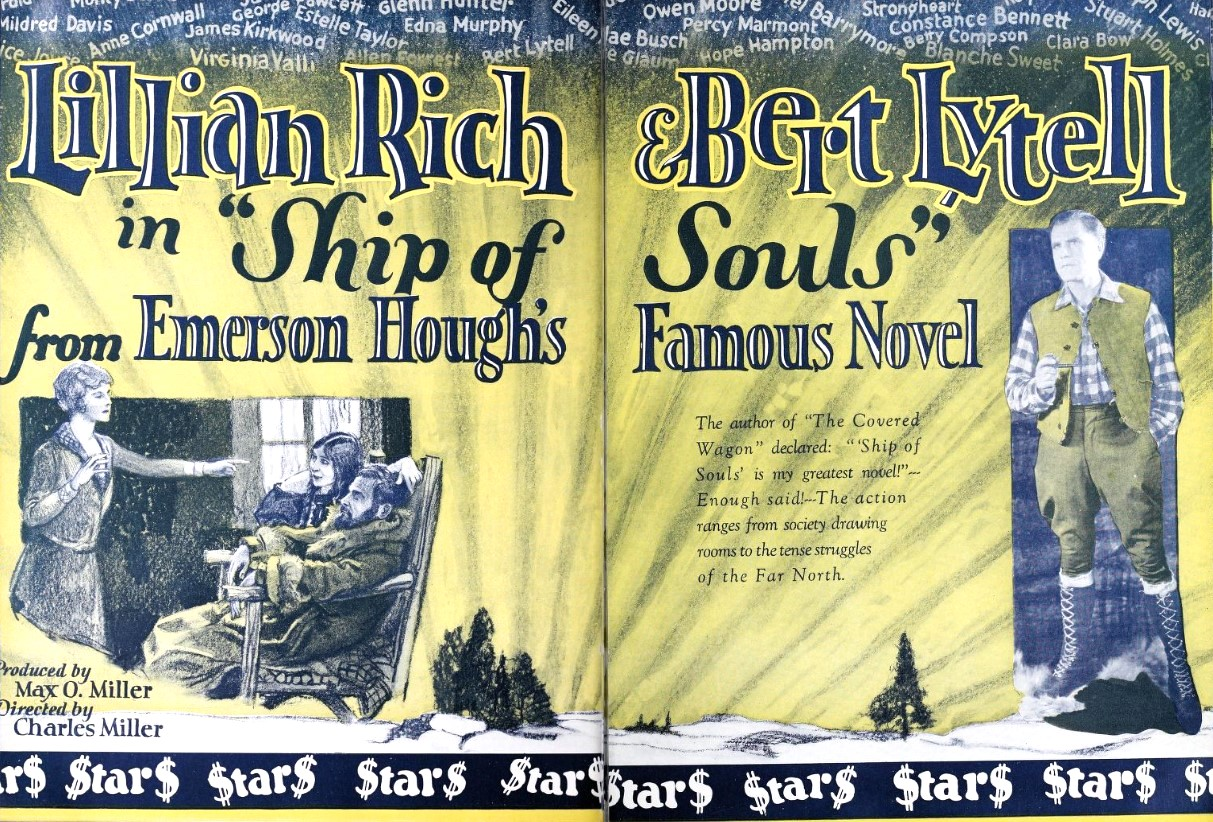
- Contemporary advertisement
- Directed by: Charles Miller
- Written by: Frank P. Donovan
- Based on: The Ship of Souls by Emerson Hough
- Produced by: Max O. Miller
- Starring: Bert Lytell; Lillian Rich; Cyril Chadwick
- Cinematography: Edwin B. DuPar
- Production companies: Encore Pictures; Stereoscopic Film Company
- Distributed by: Associated Exhibitors
- Release date: December 20, 1925
- Running time: 6 reels
- Country: United States
- Language: Silent (English intertitles)

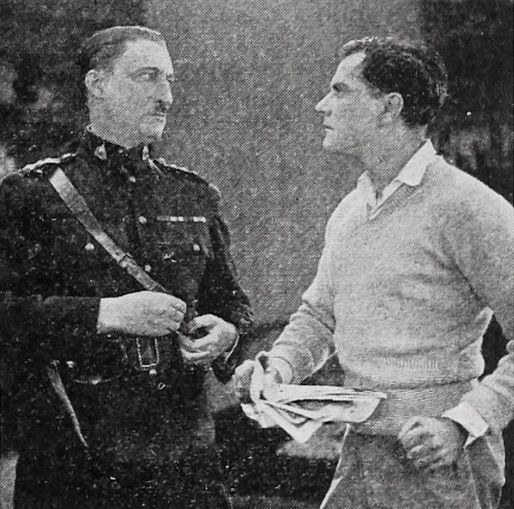
Scene with Chadwick and Lytell

The Ship of Souls or Ship of Souls is a 1925 American silent 3-D Western drama film, directed by Charles Miller. It was based on the Western novel The Ship of Souls by Emerson Hough, which was published after his death. It was produced by Max O. Miller, who created the 3-D process used in the film.

== Plot ==
Langley Barnes goes to the North Country after being abandoned by his wife. There he falls in love with Christine Garth, and even though he is not legally divorced, marries Christine. Captain Churchill is posted to the area to build a radio transmitter, and after returning to the United States, marries Langley's wife, who has now obtained a divorce. After Churchill alerts Barnes with a radio transmission, Langley remarries Christine in a legal ceremony.

== Cast ==
- Bert Lytell as Langley Barnes
- Lillian Rich as Christine Garth
- Gertrude Astor as Doris Barnes
- Earl Metcalfe as Stikeen Harry (credited as Earl Metcalf)
- Russell Simpson as Angus Garth
- Ynez Seabury as Annette Garth
- Cyril Chadwick as Churchill
- Jean Perry as Hensley
- Pete Mauer as Durgin
- William Miller as Atlin (credited as W.J. Miller)
- John Irwin as Radio Operator (credited as Jack Irwin)

== Preservation ==
With no prints of The Ship of Souls located in any film archives, it is a lost film.
