= Violet Targuse =

New Zealand playwright (1884–1937)

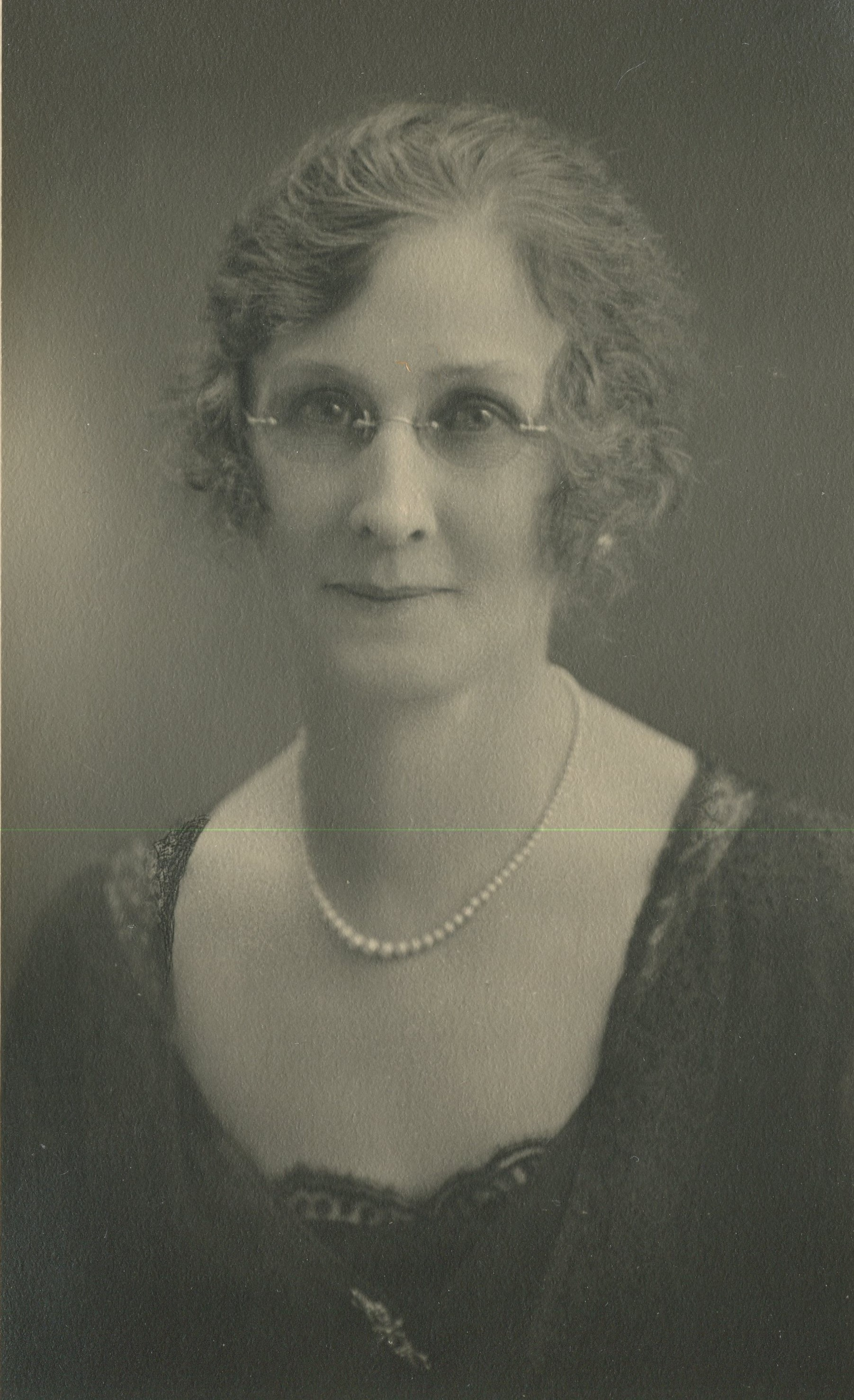
Targuse in the 1930s

Violet Targuse (née Healey, 1884–1937) was an early female playwright in New Zealand. She has been described as "probably New Zealand's most successful and least acclaimed one-act playwright", and "the most successful writer in the early years" of the New Zealand branch of the British Drama League. “It is not hard to decide who is the best-known New Zealand playwright—among the women at any rate,” wrote the Australian Women’s Mirror in 1936: Violet Targuse.

Active during the 1930s when her plays were widely performed by amateur drama groups, they focused on women, especially the experiences and concerns of rural women in New Zealand. Set in locations such as a freezing works, a sheep station, a shack on a railway siding, and a coastal lighthouse, her plays were seen as essentially New Zealand in setting, character, and expression. (Exceptions to this are Prelude, which revolves around the life of Anne Boleyn, and Auld Lang Syne, which is set in Scotland).

Targuse wrote at least 18 plays, 16 of which were one act, and 2 of which were three acts. At least 12 of these were performed in New Zealand, meanwhile some of her plays have been performed in Australia, England, Portugal, Spain, and Wales. Among her plays, 8 are now described as "lost," as surviving copies of the text cannot be currently located.

During the second half of the 20th century, Targuse's plays slowly disappeared from repertoires, until her work received renewed attention–initially by feminist scholars–starting since the 1990s. In 2000, both Fear and Rabbits were revived and performed at the Circa Theatre in Wellington. In 2009, a version of Rabbits was translated and performed as part of a multimedia production in Vitoria-Gasteiz, Spain, with further readings of the play held in Lisbon and Porto, Portugal, later that year. The installation was exhibited again at the Calouste Gulbenkian Foundation in Lisbon in 2013–14, including a performance of Rabbits on 14 January 2014, a recording of which is available to view online.

== Personal life ==
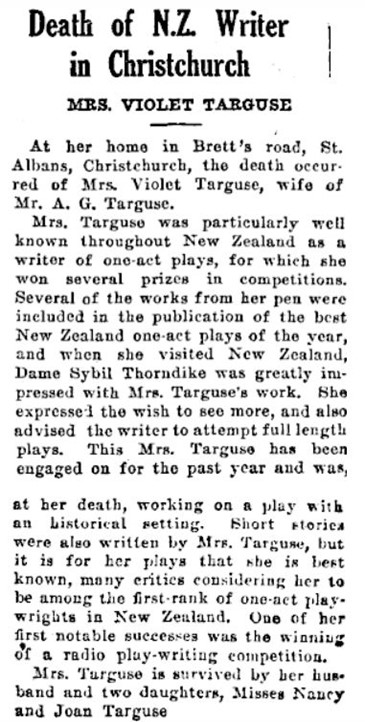
Obituary for Targuse

Violet Healey was born in Timaru in 1884. She disliked her given name and preferred to be known as "Vee" or "Vi," publishing under the initial "V." She was the seventh of nine children of two English immigrants.

Violet Healey studied at school until Standard Seven—an additional year offered by some primary schools at the time for children who could not access or afford secondary school. She worked first as a "nursemaid" (chid carer), then at the department store Ballantynes in Timaru, where she met her future husband Alfred George Targuse (1878–1944). When Alfred was transferred to Christchurch, she accompanied him and found work as a seamstress.

She played first violin in the Timaru orchestra, and was an avid reader.

Alfred and Violet had two daughters, Nancy May (1910–1980) and Marjorie Joan (1912–2008).

Targuse died with lung and breast cancer in Christchurch in 1937, at age 54.On her death certificate, Targuse’s “profession or occupation” was listed as “married.” But obituaries printed around the country stated that many critics considered her “to be among the first rank of one-act playwrights in New Zealand.”

== Drama Career ==
Along with her youngest daughter, Targuse was a member of a group that would play during scene changes at the festivals organized by the South Canterbury Drama League, one of the amateur theatre clubs that emerged in New Zealand in the late nineteenth century, and which became widespread in the 1920s and 1930s. It was in this way that in 1930 she learned of the South Canterbury Drama League’s inaugural original playwriting competition. She wrote Rabbits within three days, and won first place and was awarded a prize of ten guineas.

Rabbits debuted on 10 and 11 November 1930 at Timaru’s new Little Playhouse—a former Masonic Lodge recently acquired by the South Canterbury Drama League, turning them into the first drama group in New Zealand to have their own performance space. Later in 1931, Rabbits was performed again, this time by the Canterbury Repertory Theatre Society in Radiant Hall, Christchurch, for two nights in November, alongside plays by four other New Zealand playwrights: Alan Mulgan, Ngaio Marsh, Francis Oswald Bennett, and Arnold Wall. Christchurch’s Star newspaper noted that the “performances were a guide to aspiring New Zealand playwrights in many ways,” but that Rabbits “stood out from the rest as something which was really New Zealand in its outlook.”

In August 1932, Targuse again won the South Canterbury Drama League’s one-act play competition—against 24 other entries—with The Touchstone. In September 1932, her plays Fear and Touchstone won first-place-equal in the first playwriting competition held by the New Zealand branch of the British Drama League. She was also the inaugural winner of the Radio Record trophy, and a prize from the Chelsea Drama Club of Sydney.

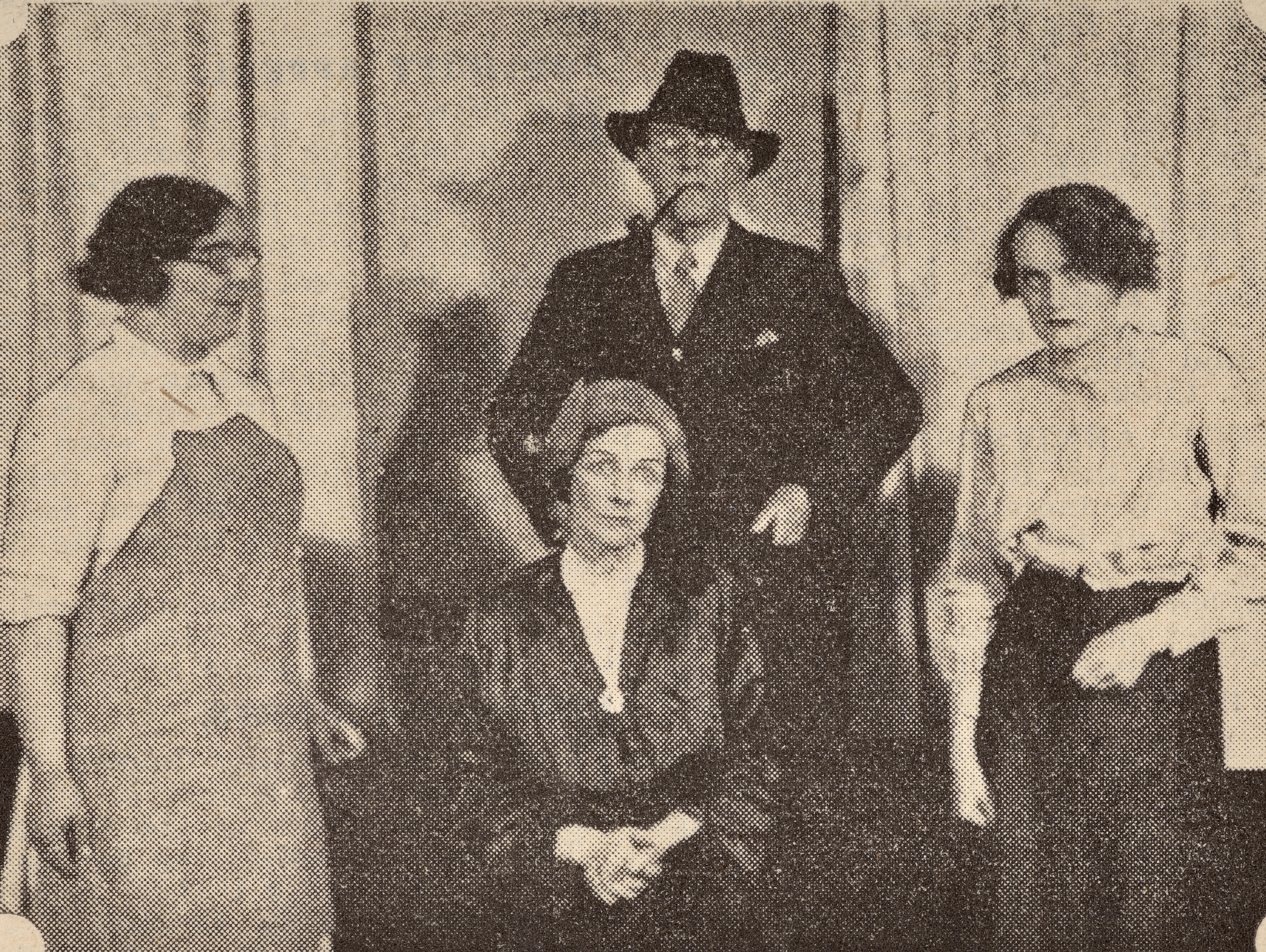
Cast of "The Fugitive" performed by the Horncastle and District Amateur Dramatic Society, in Alford, UK, March 1938

Rabbits, Fear, and The Touchstone were soon being performed around New Zealand. Targuse’s plays proved particularly popular with women’s community groups. An important activity for the local area branches of the British Drama League was to organize an annual festival of one-act plays in which local groups competed as teams; Targuse’s plays were also popular choices for such competitions.

Her plays were also often presented as simple staged readings, a popular activity local literary and arts societies. Rabbits, Fear, and The Touchstone were also produced as radio plays in both Australia and New Zealand.

However, there is no record of either of Targuse's three-act plays ever being produced.

In 1933, Targuse debuted five plays, Wild Oats, Responding to Treatment, Volte Face, Ebb and Flow, and Beyond the Walls. In August 1933, in the original play-writing competition of the South Canterbury Drama League, out of 24 entries, Ebb and Flow took first place, and Beyond the Walls took second place, tied.

In October 1934, Targuse won the British Drama League’s national playwriting competition’s “Tui’s Annual trophy” for the best one-act play by a New Zealand author, with Mopsey taking the cup, and Men for Pieces coming in second.

In 1934, Beyond the Walls, now renamed as The Fugitive, won second place in the British Drama League’s playwriting competition judged in England, while Men for Pieces received an honourable mention. Approximately 200 plays from the United Kingdom and the British dominions were entered in the competition.

Targuse’ next play—The Hikers—debuted on 7 May 1935, as part of “Empire Night” celebrations put on by the Geraldine Women’s Institute for the Silver Jubilee of King George V.

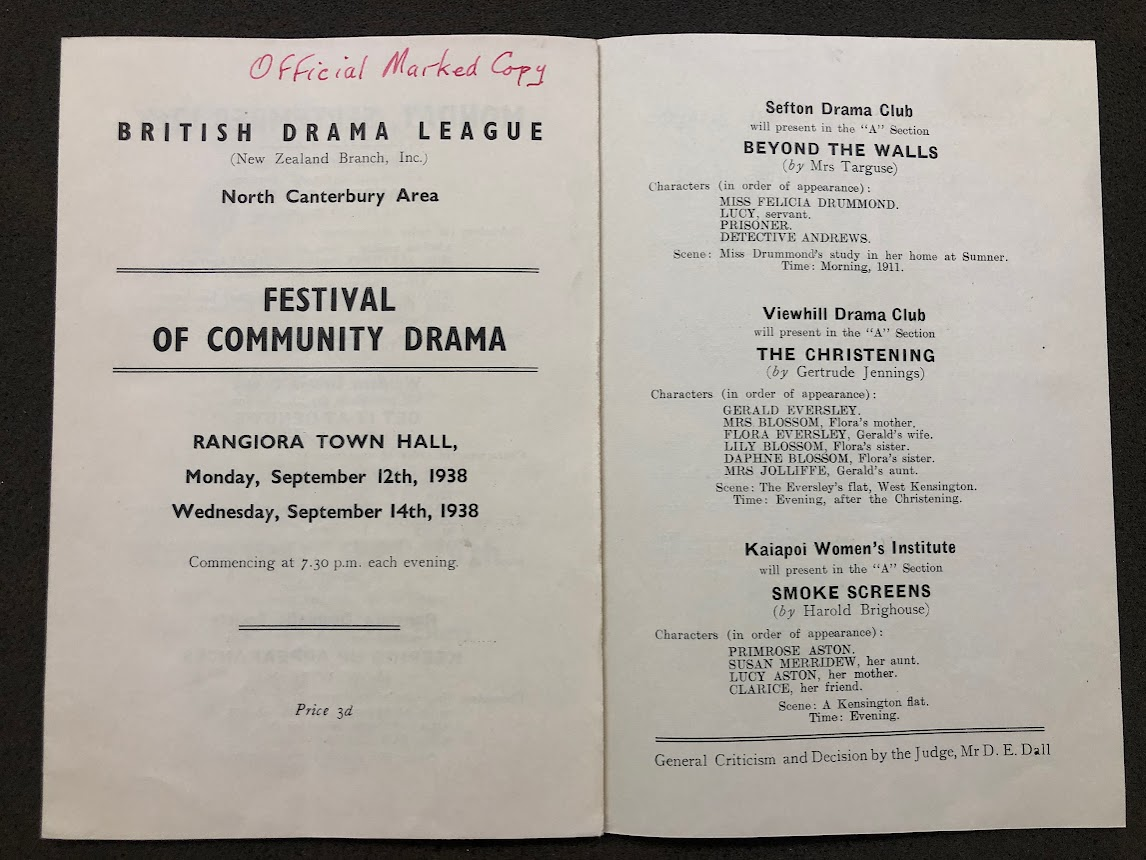
The program from the Festival of Community Drama, Rangiora, New Zealand, September 1938

Passing Discord, won the first broadcast-play competition in New Zealand in 1934.

Scene Macabre was awarded first place in June 1935 in the playwriting category at the South Canterbury Women Institute’s exhibition. In October 1935, Prelude and Scene Macabre came in fourth and fifth, respectively, in the British Drama League’s “Tui’s Annual” play competition, pipped by three male writers.

Targuse's last known play, The Reaper, won third place in the British Drama League’s “Tui’s Annual” competition in September 1936.

Despite her success during the 1930s, changing theatrical tastes and the decline of one-act play festivals led to a period of obscurity. Her plays were occasionally performed into the 1950s but fell out of favour in subsequent decades.

Interest in Targuse revived in the 1990s and early 2000s, driven by feminist scholarship and theatrical retrospectives. In 2000, Rabbits and Fear were staged at the Circa Theatre in Wellington as part of the "Backblocks and Beyond" series. In 2009, Portuguese artist André Guedes incorporated Rabbits into his multimedia installation Airotiv at the Centro Cultural Montehermoso in Vitoria-Gasteiz, Spain, drawing parallels between the Great Depression and the Great Recession. Further theatrical readings of the play took place in Lisbon and Porto later that year. The installation was exhibited again at the Calouste Gulbenkian Foundation in Lisbon in 2013–14, where Rabbits was performed on 14 January 2014. A complete recording of that performance is available to view online.

In 2011, Playmarket republished Rabbits in a national anthology of New Zealand plays, prompting renewed critical appreciation. Her plays are now viewed as foundational in the history of New Zealand theatre and women’s dramatic literature.

== Dramatic Style ==
Targuse's plays are characterized by their realism, focus on rural domestic life, and psychological depth, especially in female characters. She was adept at capturing the vernacular and social concerns of 1930s New Zealand, including unemployment, isolation, and women's roles within the family. She often incorporated contemporary references and set her plays in recognizably New Zealand environments.

British actress Dame Sybil Thorndike praised Fear and Touchstone as "highly dramatic, novel situations, and full of a life that must be expressed."

Victor Stanton Lloyd, who had been deeply involved in the British Drama League since its founding and had judged each of its play competitions and many of its festivals, wrote in 1936: “Mrs V. Targuse has published several one-act plays dealing with life in this Dominion which are worthy of serious consideration.”

== Plays ==
- Rabbits (1930): When Mrs. Benson visits her friend Maggie Blake, she finds her dishevelled yet giddy in expectation of good news from her husband about an opportunity to move away from their isolated shack in the Canterbury plains. When Maggie’s husband returns in the evening, he indeed has good news. But it is not what Maggie was awaiting.
- Sentiment (1931; unpublished; currently considered lost)
- Fear (1932): It has been almost three years since Finola Murdoch lost her abusive husband in the Murchison earthquake, yet she continues to live in fear of him. Meanwhile, her new husband, Simon, must deal with trouble at the abattoir he manages.
- The Touchstone (1932): The long-term friendships between two sheep farming couples has deteriorated, and one of the wives, Kate McLean, is desperate to mend the relationships. Peata, an older woman who lives nearby, knows something crucial about the cause of their conflict.
- The Tramp Scamp (1932; unpublished during Targuse's lifetime, published 2025): When Sandra’s desire to marry Cyril Devereaux is put in jeopardy by her aunt Helen’s firm refusal to allow the marriage, Sandra hatches a scheme to change her aunt’s mind. But the arrival of an unexpected visitor at the kitchen door, and an approaching bushfire, threaten the success of her elaborate plan.
- Volte Face (1933; performed but unpublished, currently considered lost): The action takes place in the house of Edward and Edith Dale, a childless couple, and concerns the change that occurs in their lives when they are visited by an old friend, Charles Henderson.
- Wild Oats (1933; performed but unpublished, currently considered lost): A somewhat selfish family react to the disappearance, under supposedly suspicious circumstances, of the usually devoted and unselfish mother. A former sweetheart is supposed to be the guilty man, but on her return, the family, to their intense relief, learn that the mother had been on an errand of mercy. During the mother’s absence the members of the family suffer qualms of conscience concerning their selfishness, but, unfortunately, they are only temporary, and father goes out to spend the evening at the club as usual.
- Responding to Treatment (1933; performed but unpublished, currently considered lost): A spoilt husband whose family wait on him hand and foot in an endeavour to check an approaching cold. Smothered in rugs, with the members of his family running around in search of cushions and medical remedies, until a friend entices the invalid to a more cheery gathering and a more enjoyable pursuit than the swallowing of medicine pills.
- Ebb and Flow (1934): At a lighthouse off the coast of New Zealand, Rachel Watts is mourning more than just the recent loss of her younger sister, whom she had raised since childhood following the death of their mother.
- The Fugitive, performed in New Zealand as Beyond the Walls (1934): Felicia Drummond is busy working on parish paperwork, but her maid Lucy is eager to share news of a woman who has escaped from Lyttelton jail. When Felicia spots the fugitive outside in the garden, the clergyman’s daughter, who has lived her life always expected to toe the line, is forced to make some big decisions.
- Men for Pieces (1934): Jean Goulding is at home anxiously awaiting the return of her husband, Sam, after serving 20 years in prison for a crime he did not commit. Jean has worked hard and struggled in her husband’s absence, and has tried to keep the home just as it was before Sam left for prison. Almost as soon as Sam arrives home there is a knock at the door and a one-time friend, Mrs Dobson, arrives with a request for Sam that Jean cannot support.
- Auld Lang Syne (1934; unpublished during Targuse's lifetime, published 2025): Based on the novel Nancy Stair by Elinor Macartney Lane. Nancy Stair is a fiercely intelligent, accomplished, well-educated, charming, and beautiful young woman, with a strong belief in justice. When, within the course of just one day, she meets two eligible suitors, it appears that she will have a difficult choice to make. But a rivalry develops between the two men, and soon Nancy must deal with a more consequential moral dilemma.
- Passing Discord (1934; unpublished, currently considered lost)
- Mopsey (1935): Peter is the guardian of his younger sister, Mopsey, who has been left with an intellectual disability since an accident as a young girl. When Peter falls in love with Barbara, he suddenly feels pulled in different directions.
- The Hikers (1935; performed but unpublished, currently considered lost)
- Scene Macabre (1935; unpublished, currently considered lost)
- The Reaper (1936; unpublished, currently considered lost)
- Prelude (1936): Anne Boleyn is a maid of honour to Catherine of Aragon, wife of England’s King Henry VIII. When the queen refuses to intercede on Anne’s behalf so that she can marry the man she loves, Anne loses her temper and reveals her Protestant leanings. The queen banishes Anne from court and Anne’s fate appears sealed until a chance encounter changes the course of history.
