= The Witchery of Archery =

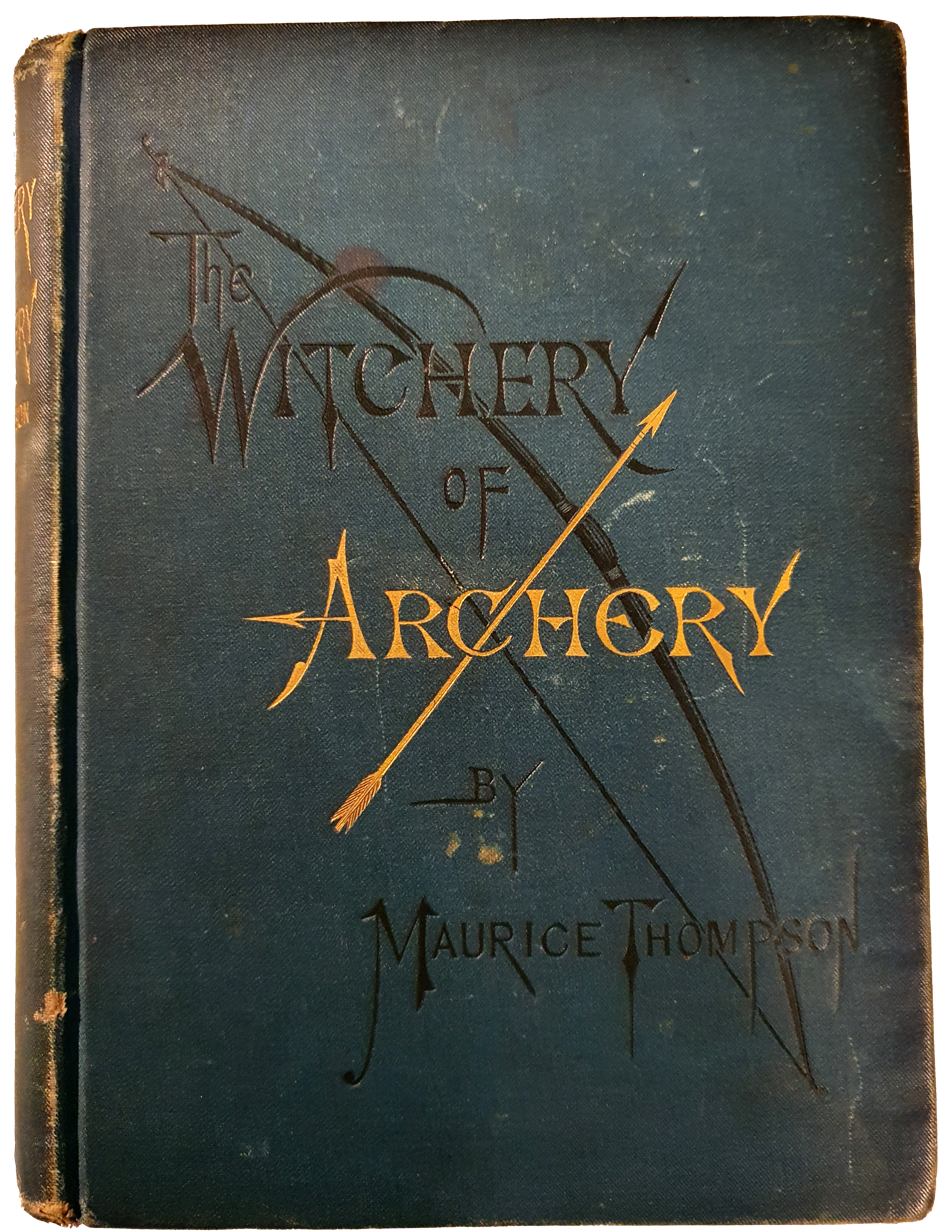
Front cover of The Witchery of Archery

The Witchery of Archery, written by Maurice Thompson in 1878, was the first book in English about hunting with a bow ever published. Its full title is The Witchery of Archery: A Complete Manual of Archery. With Many Chapters of Adventures by Field and Flood, and an Appendix Containing Practical Directions for the Manufacture and Use of Archery Implements. It was the first important book about archery written in English since Toxophilus, which was written in 1545. It was said that Witchery "...has as much effect on archery as Uncle Tom's Cabin had on the Civil War.

== Background ==
When Thompson wrote The Witchery of Archery, he filled it with various stories, many of which were humorous. However, it also gave practical advice on the sport, such as the manufacturing of archery paraphernalia and how to use the equipment while hunting.

The Witchery of Archery was accredited for returning the sport of archery to public interest. Some of this was due to rifles bringing back bad memories of the American Civil War. However, the revival also served some larger, pragmatic purpose: ex-Confederate soldiers were not allowed guns, but needed hunting to survive; archery became a convenient substitution. In addition, the late 1800s saw the last of the American Indian Wars, thus romanticizing the Native Americans and their cultures, which, in most accounts, included expert archery. In 1880, with the book less than two years old, patents relating to archery items greatly increased. More than any other book, The Witchery of Archery led to the increased interest in archery for the next half-century.

A year after The Witchery of Archery was published, Thompson was selected as the first president of the National Archery Association, largely due to the book.

A writer of several books, Thompson seemed to show little pride in writing The Witchery of Archery. On the title pages of his various works, he would list several titles he authored, but never did he list '"The Witchery of Archery'.

== See also ==
- History of archery
