= Eben Holden =

1900 novel by Irving Bacheller

Eben Holden: A Tale of the North Country
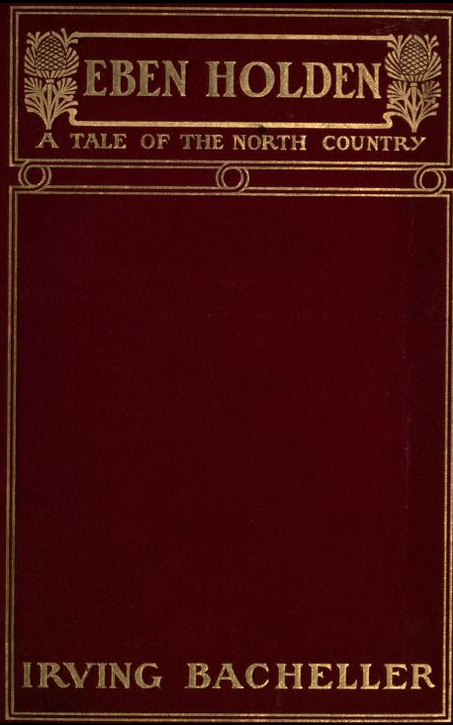
- First edition cover
- Author: Irving Bacheller
- Language: English
- Genre: Novel
- Publisher: Lothrop Publishing Company
- Publication date: July 2, 1900
- Publication place: United States
- Media type: Print (hardcover)
- Pages: 432 pp

Eben Holden: A Tale of the North Country is a 1900 novel by Irving Bacheller. It was a popular book at the time of its release, among the top 10 bestselling books in the United States in both 1900 and 1901. The book is set in the North Country region of New York.

== Publication ==
Bacheller's first draft of the novel was meant for children, which he submitted to St. Nicholas Magazine and other publications, which all rejected it. When David Harum (1898) became a big success, he revised it in a similar mold. It was released by Lothrop Publishing Company on July 2, 1900. It found immediate popularity, reportedly selling 125,000 copies in the first four months of release. For the February and March 1901 issues of The Bookman, it tied with Alice of Old Vincennes as the best-selling book in the United States. As a result, some modern references refer to the novel as the "first best-selling novel of the 20th century."

A "dramatic edition" of the novel was released in 1901 with seven photographs of the play based on the novel, and an author portrait. In 1903, twelve photographs by Clarence Hudson White were included in a "de luxe" edition of the novel.

A 1956 article by literary scholar Walter Harding noted that while the book had fallen far out of popularity by then (the copy he reviewed had last been checked out of the library in 1931), "one was not well-read in 1900 unless he had read Eben Holden." While he opined that "its sentimentality borders on the laughable ... its melodrama is impossible [and] its language is deplorable," he concluded that "despite all this, it is still surprisingly readable."

Bacheller's slim volume, Eben Holden's Last Day A-Fishing, was published in 1907.

== Adaptations ==
Edward Everett Rose was commissioned to adapt the novel into a play, which had its Broadway debut on October 28, 1901 at the Savoy Theatre, managed by Charles Frohman, and with Edmund Milton Holland playing the title role. It played through December 14 before going on tour.

== Legacy ==
Bacheller graduated from St. Lawrence University in 1882, and later served on its board of trustees. The University's English honor society is called The Irving Bacheller Society, and all inductees receive a copy of Eben Holden. Eben Holden is also the name of a campus building.
