= Jane Cable =

1906 novel by George Barr McCutcheon

- Author: George Barr McCutcheon
- Illustrator: Harrison Fisher (frontispiece)
- Language: English
- Genre: Novel
- Publisher: Dodd, Mead and Company
- Publication date: September 1906
- Media type: Print (hardcover)
- Pages: 336

Jane Cable is a 1906 novel by George Barr McCutcheon, and was the fifth best-selling novel in the United States in 1906. It was also the best selling book in the United States for the month in the January 1907 issue of The Bookman. It was also serialized by newspapers in 1908.

== Plot ==
A contemporary synopsis of the melodrama novel's plot describes it as follows:

This is a story of American life the scene of which is laid in Chicago at the present time. Jane Cable, the heroine of the tale, is a beautiful and aristocratic girl, supposed to be the daughter of David Cable, a rich railroad magnate. This, however, is not the truth, as in reality she was taken from a foundling hospital when an infant, by Mrs. Cable, who deceived her husband into believing it was her own child. She did this in order to end an estrangement which existed between her husband and herself and to bring him back to her from the distant west, where he had been for some time. Her ruse worked to perfection and was only known to an unscrupulous lawyer named James Bansemer, and his confidential clerk Elias Droom, to whom she applied in order to take out the papers of adoption. At that time the Cables were in very moderate circumstances and David was only an engineer on the railroad, but he rose rapidly from this position, and eventually became rich and influential. Cable is devoted to his beautiful daughter, who he never suspects is not his own child; and his wife, during the passage of time, has gradually lost the haunting dread of being found out. Her peace of mind is rudely shattered however, by the appearance of Bansemer on the scene, who proceeds to blackmail her for a large sum of money. In the meantime Jane has become engaged to Graydon Bansemer, James's son, a fine fellow, who has no suspicious of his father's real character or business dealings. After a series of dramatic incidents, which bring about Mrs. Cable's confession and her husband's forgiveness, the truth is brutally told to Jane by Bansemer, who wishes to prevent her marriage to his son. Jane is crushed by the news and breaks off her engagement with Graydon. He at once enlists in the army and goes to the Philippines, where she follows him later in the company of friends. Graydon is severely wounded and Jane who has become a red-cross nurse tends him till he is restored to health. He resigns from the Army and they return home, Jane still persisting in her refusal to marry him. Finally, however, the elder Bansemer who is paying for his misdeeds in the penitentiary, confesses his knowledge that Jane's antecedents are of the best and she and Graydon are united at last.
