= The Mississippi Bubble =

1902 novel by Emerson Hough

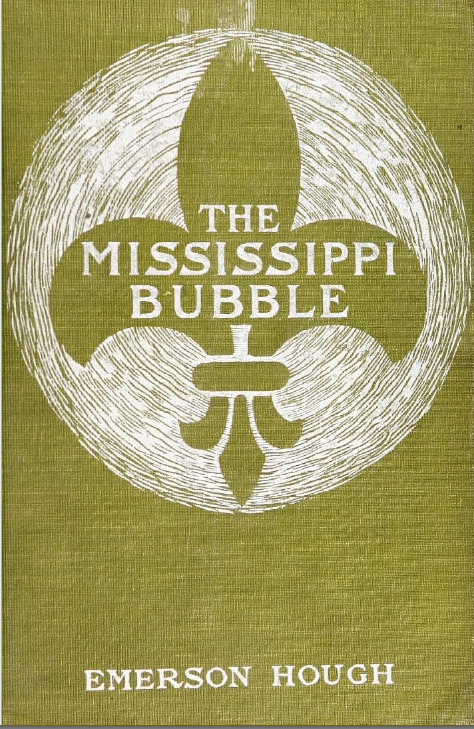
- Author: Emerson Hough
- Illustrator: Henry Hutt
- Language: English
- Genre: Novel
- Publisher: Bowen-Merrill Company
- Publication date: April 1902
- Media type: Print (hardcover)
- Pages: 454

The Mississippi Bubble is a 1902 novel by American author Emerson Hough. It was Hough's first bestseller, and the fourth-best selling novel in the United States in 1902.

The historical novel revolves around the story of John Law (1671-1729) and the "Mississippi Bubble", an economic bubble of speculative investment in the French colony of Louisiana.

The book sold well from the time of its release, with The New York Times reporting 1,000 copies selling per day in the first month of its release. It became the number one best-selling book in America for the month in the August 1902 issue of The Bookman.

Hough wrote the book at night, working between 10pm and 4am, after his day job at Forest and Stream magazine in Chicago. He earned $11,640.15 from it.
