= Peter (novel) =

1908 novel by Francis Hopkinson Smith

- First edition
- Author: Francis Hopkinson Smith
- Illustrator: Arthur I. Keller
- Language: English
- Genre: Novel
- Set in: New York
- Published: 1908 by Charles Scribner's Sons
- Publication date: August 29, 1908
- Publication place: United States
- Media type: Print (hardcover)
- Pages: 482 pp
- OCLC: 6209999
- Dewey Decimal: 813.49
- LC Class: PZ3.S647

Peter: A Novel Of Which He Is Not The Hero is a novel published in 1908 by Francis Hopkinson Smith, which was the sixth best selling book in the United States in 1908, and ninth best-selling book of 1909. It sold in excess of 100,000 copies.

== Plot ==
The book is set in New York City, but the New York of a few decades prior to 1908 when the book was released. Peter Grayson is an aging banker of the old school; an upstanding and cultured gentleman, and not prone to engage in speculation. Peter also influences the younger generation around him, including a young man who comes to New York to work in the financial world.

== Reception ==
As Smith was a well-known and popular American author of his day, the book was widely reviewed, with mixed to positive reviews. For example, H.L. Mencken wrote "It is a delightful world that Mr. Smith inhabits--a world made up of loyalty, true love and simple faith. ... there is not much plot in the book, but what there is is not without its grip."

Released in late August 1908 with illustrations by Arthur I. Keller, the book soon made it onto best seller lists, becoming the sixth-best selling book of 1908 and ninth-best of 1909. It sold particularly well in December 1908, based on the fact that it went through four printings that month alone. The novel was never adapted to the stage or film.
