= North Country (New York) =

Geographic region of New York

Coordinates: 44.471°N 74.840°W

The North Country of Upstate New York is the northernmost region of the U.S. state of New York. It is bordered by Lake Champlain to the east and further east to the adjacent state of Vermont and the New England region; the Adirondack Mountains / Adirondack Park and the Upper Capital District with the state capital of Albany to the south; the Mohawk Valley region of New York to the southwest; the Canadian-American international border (with the Province of Ontario in Canada) to the north; and Lake Ontario, (the eastern-most of the Great Lakes) and the Saint Lawrence River / Saint Lawrence Seaway, and beyond the waters again to Ontario / Canada to the west. A mostly rural forested area, the North Country includes seven counties (or 14, according to another group) of the 62 in New York state.

Fort Drum, a United States Army base, is also located in the North Country region in Jefferson County, near Watertown, as is the adjacent Adirondack Park of 6.1 million acres, established 1892 as the oldest state park in the nation, and preserved / operated by the Adirondack Park Agency and the New York State Department of Environmental Conservation. As of 2024, the population of the region was 420,311 (revised figure from the last 2020 United States census).

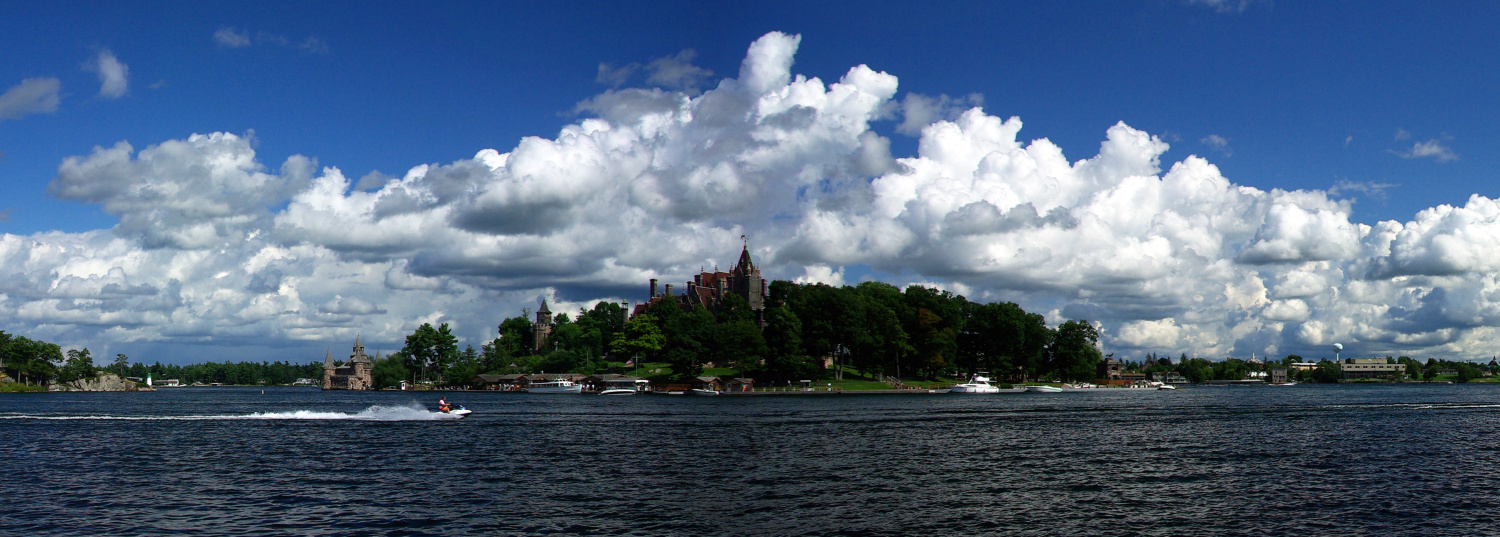
The Thousand Islands constitute an archipelago within the Saint Lawrence River to the north. Boldt Castle, on Heart Island, is seen at center.

The term "North Country" was first widely popularized within New York by the 1900 novel Eben Holden by Irving Bacheller.

== Economy ==
From a report on the North Country from the Federal Reserve Bank of New York, the North Country made up 1.5% of the total population of New York State in 2023 and its population declined 3.9% over 10 years prior. The region contributed .83% to New York State's total GDP. Job growth experienced a 3.2% decline over 5 years prior to 2023 in part due to steep declines in the region's manufacturing sector. Key local job sectors include education, government, healthcare, agriculture, retail, tourism, manufacturing, and timber. Unemployment rates have disproportionately been higher in the region compared to New York state overall since the 1990s, though it has been steadily declining.

== Counties ==
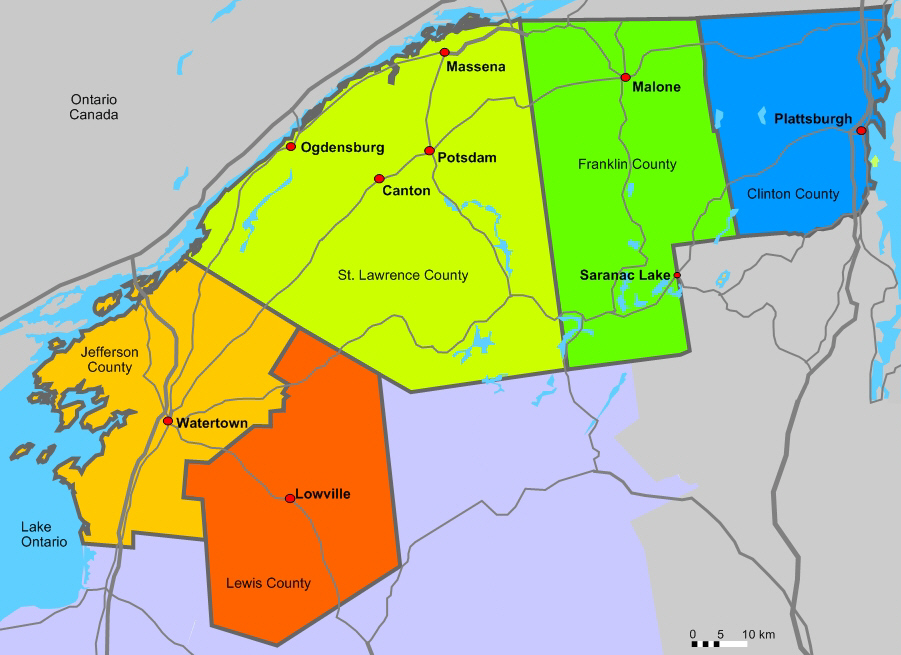
Map showing five counties and several of the largest towns in the northern and westernmost parts of the North Country region, out of the traditional 7 or 14 counties, considered to make up the region

According to the Empire State Development Corporation in the state capital of Albany, New York, the North Country encompasses the following seven counties:

- Clinton
- Essex
- Franklin
- Hamilton
- Jefferson
- Lewis
- St. Lawrence

However, according to another interest group of the Adirondack North Country Association, the North Country consists of a larger designated area of 14 counties; with those listed above and also the following further south and west:

- Fulton
- Herkimer
- Oneida
- Oswego
- Saratoga
- Warren
- Washington

These are all counties in which part of Adirondack State Park resides.

Herb Hallas summarizes both views:

The state-sanctioned North Country extends from the eastern shore of Lake Ontario eastward across the top tier of the state to the western edge of Lake Champlain. and from the Canadian-American international border on the north to the southern boundary of Hamilton County. As such, it is much larger and more stable than either of the traditionalist North Countries. The state-sanctioned North Country consists of 7 counties of northern New York state: Clinton, Essex, Franklin, Hamilton, St. Lawrence, Jefferson and Lewis. The New York State Department of Labor, the New York State Regional Development Council, and the Empire State Development Agency serve people who live in the state-sanctioned and designated North Country. The contemporary North Country takes in the largest area of all the North Countries. It extends from the Canadian border on the north to the Erie Canal on the south, and from the shores of Lake Ontario in the west to the edge of Lake Champlain to the east. The contemporary North Country includes all of the famous Adirondack Park, with 14 surrounding counties, 14 cities, 255 towns and almost 40 percent of the state’s geographic area. The Adirondack North Country Association, an economic development organization that also promotes tourism, serves people living in the contemporary North Country, as does North Country Public Radio local network of stations (part of the National Public Radio (NPR) system).

== See also ==
- Adirondack Park
- Ausable Chasm
- Fort Drum
- Thousand Islands
- Upstate New York
- Lake George
