= USS Shuttle =

Patrol vessel of the United States Navy

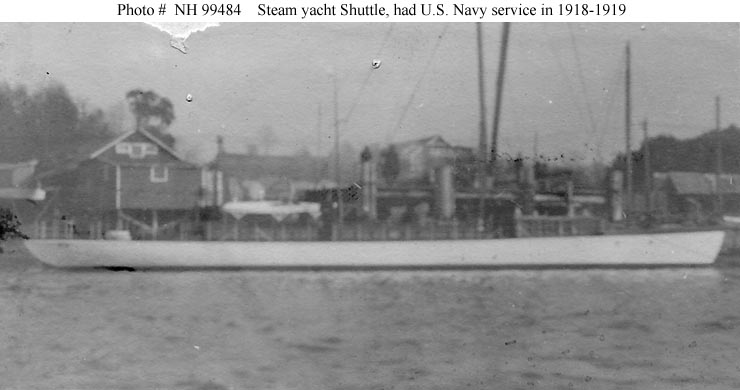
- Shuttle as a private yacht sometime between 1906 and 1917.

History

United States
- Name: USS Shuttle
- Namesake: Previous name retained
- Builder: Herreshoff Manufacturing Company, Bristol, Rhode Island
- Completed: 1906
- Acquired: 31 October 1918
- Fate: Returned to owner 28 March 1919
- Notes: Operated as private yacht Shuttle 1906-1917 and from 1919

General characteristics
- Type: Patrol vessel
- Tonnage: 33 Gross register tons
- Displacement: 42 tons
- Length: 94 ft 6 in (28.80 m)
- Beam: 10 ft 6 in (3.20 m)
- Draft: 3 ft 6 in (1.07 m)
- Propulsion: Steam engine
- Speed: 15 knots
- Complement: 6

USS Shuttle (SP-3572), also listed as ID-3572, was a United States Navy patrol vessel in commission from 1918 to 1919.

Shuttle was built as a private steam yacht in 1906 by the Herreshoff Manufacturing Company at Bristol, Rhode Island. On 31 October 1918, the U.S. Navy acquired her at Glen Cove, New York, from her owner, H. P. Davidson of New York, for use as a section patrol boat during World War I and assigned her a naval identification number; sources disagree on whether the number was the section patrol number SP-3572 or the naval registry identification number ID-3572. World War I ended eleven days after her acquisition.

Assigned to the Navy's Bureau of Ordnance, Shuttle served on the Potomac River, transporting personnel between the Washington Navy Yard in Washington, D.C., the Naval Proving Ground at Indian Head, Maryland, and the ordnance facility at Machodoc Creek.

The Navy returned Shuttle to Davidson on 28 March 1919 at Glenwood Landing, New York.
