= Alice of Old Vincennes =

Alice of Old Vincennes, written by Maurice Thompson in 1900, is a novel set in Vincennes during the American Revolutionary War.

== Reception ==
The book was a popular best-seller. It was the tenth-highest best selling book in the United States in 1900, and the second best selling book in 1901 (bested only by The Crisis). It was listed as the best-selling book in the United States in six consecutive monthly issues of The Bookman, from January through June 1901 (tied with Eben Holden for two of those months).
