= 54-40 or Fight (book) =

1909 book by Emerson Hough

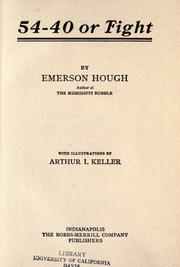
- Author: Emerson Hough
- Illustrator: Arthur I. Keller
- Language: English
- Subject: American history
- Publisher: Grosset and Dunlap or The Bobbs-Merrill Company
- Publication date: 1909
- Publication place: United States
- Pages: 402
- Followed by: Purchase Price

'54-40 or Fight' is the first book in a trilogy by Emerson Hough. The next two books in the trilogy are Purchase Price and John Rawn. The title references the expansion of the United States that President James K. Polk called for. The expansion was to include Texas, California, and the Oregon Territory. Since the northern boundary of Oregon was the latitude line of 54 degrees, 40 minutes, "fifty-four forty or fight!" became a popular slogan. The book was dedicated to Theodore Roosevelt. 54-40 or Fight was a financial success.

== Sources ==
- E., Wylder, Delbert (1981). Emerson Hough. Boston: Twayne Publishers. ISBN 9780805773286. OCLC 6916169.
