= Janice Meredith =

1924 film by E. Mason Hopper

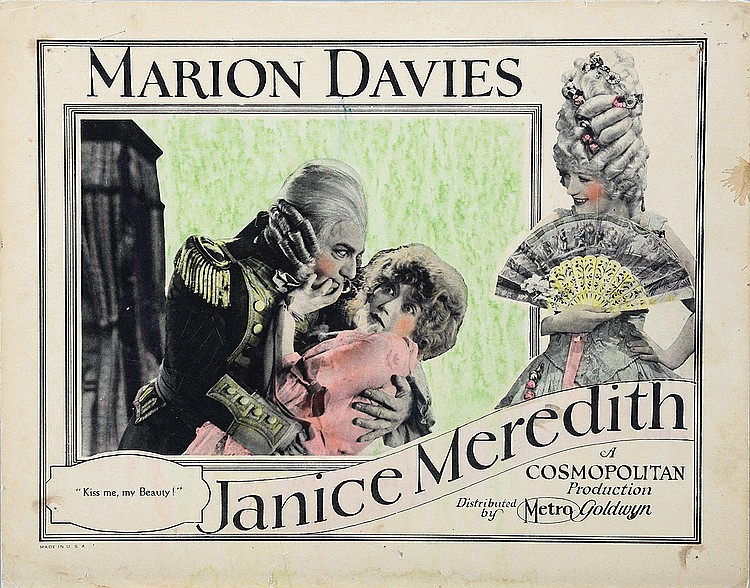
- Lobby card
- Directed by: E. Mason Hopper; E. J. Babille (assistant)
- Written by: Lillie Hayward
- Based on: Janice Meredith by Paul Leicester Ford and Edward Everett Rose
- Produced by: William Randolph Hearst
- Starring: Marion Davies; Holbrook Blinn; Maclyn Arbuckle; Tyrone Power Sr. Joseph Kilgour
- Cinematography: George Barnes; Ira H. Morgan
- Edited by: Walter Futter
- Music by: Deems Taylor
- Distributed by: Metro-Goldwyn
- Release date: December 8, 1924
- Running time: 153 minutes
- Country: United States
- Languages: Silent film /English intertitles
- Budget: $1.5 million

Janice Meredith, also known as The Beautiful Rebel, is a silent film starring Marion Davies, released in 1924 and based on the book and play Janice Meredith written by Paul Leicester Ford and Edward Everett Rose. The play opened at the end of 1900 and was the first starring vehicle for stage actress Mary Mannering. The movie follows the actions of Janice Meredith, who helps George Washington and Paul Revere during the American Revolutionary War.

== Plot ==
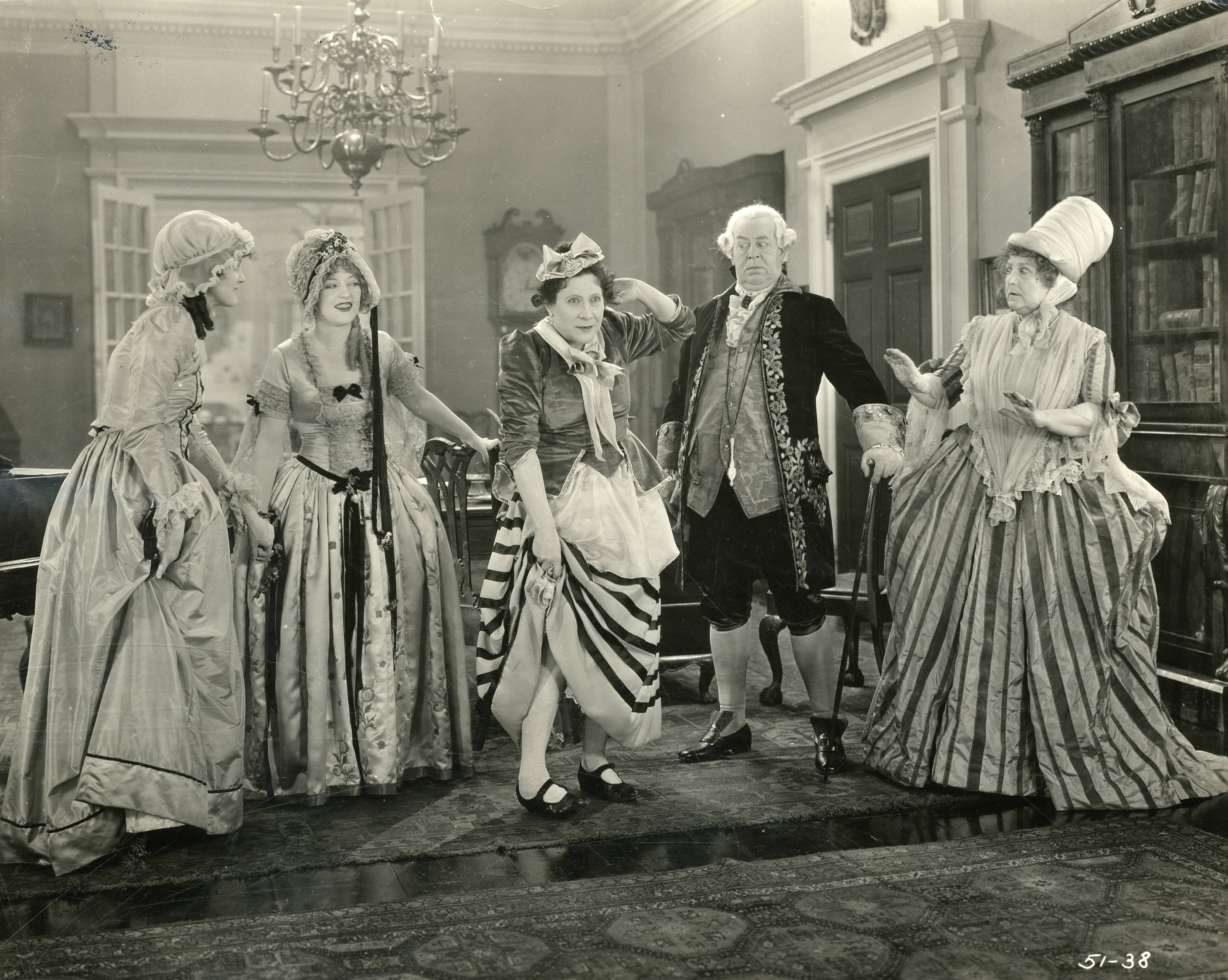
Janice Meredith film still, 1925

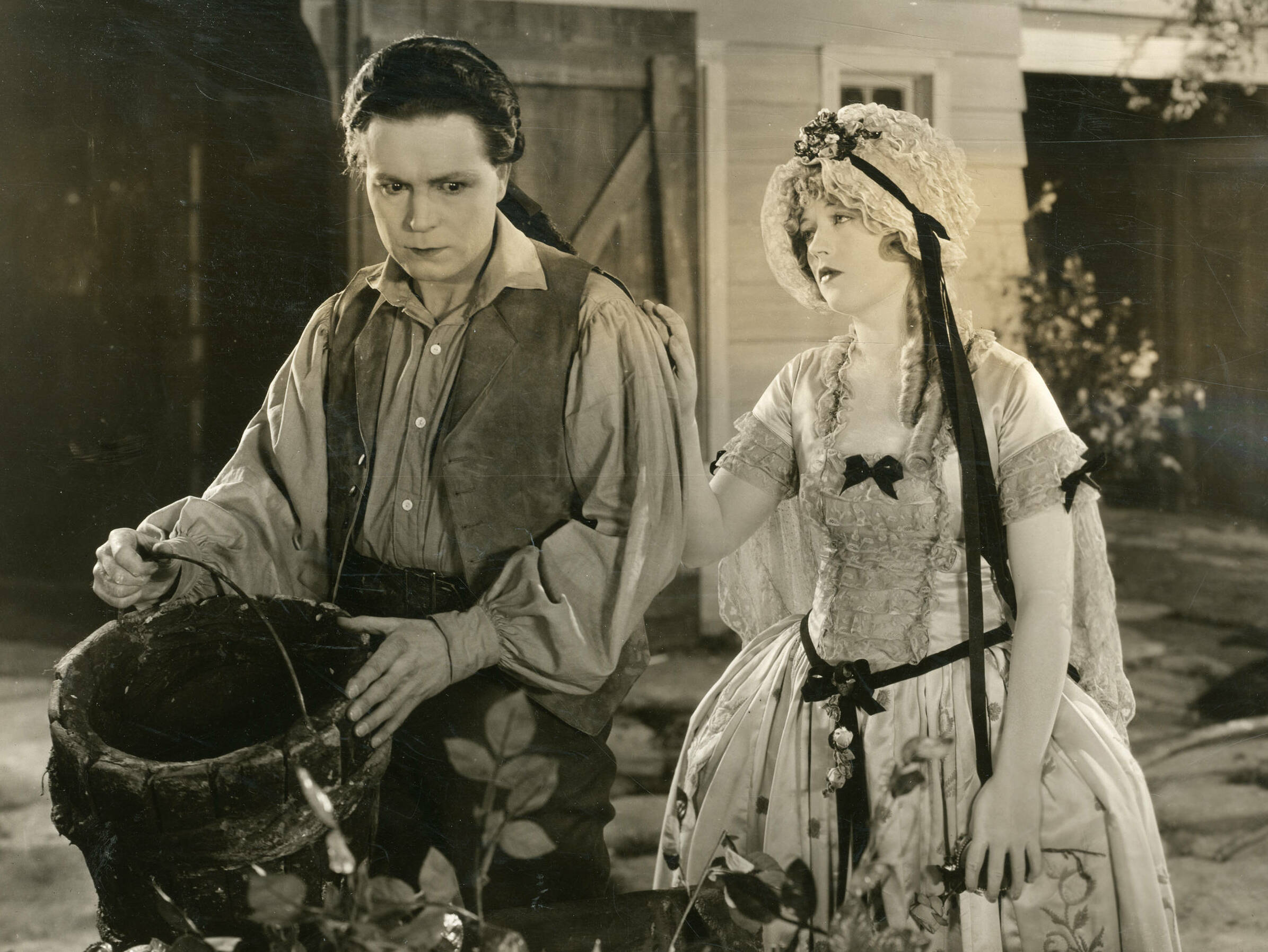
Harrison Ford and Marion Davies

Following a disappointment in love, Lord Brereton assumes the name of Charles Fownes, arranges passage to the American Colonies as a bondservant, and finds a place with Squire Meredith, a wealthy New Jersey landowner. When Charles falls in love with the squire's daughter, Janice, she is sent to live with an aunt in Boston. Janice learns of the planned British troop movement to the Lexington arsenal and gives the warning that results in Paul Revere's ride. Charles reveals his true station and becomes an aide to Washington. When he is captured by the British, Janice arranges his escape and later helps him learn the disposition of the British troops at Trenton. Janice returns to her home and agrees to marry Philemon Hennion, an aristocrat of her father's choosing. Charles and some Continental troops halt the wedding and confiscate the Meredith lands. Janice flees to Philadelphia, and Charles follows her. He is arrested but is freed when the British general, Howe, recognizes Charles as his old friend, Lord Brereton. Janice and her father retire with the British to Yorktown. During the bombardment by Washington's forces, Lord Clowes binds Janice and abducts her in his coach. Charles rescues her. With peace restored, Janice and Charles meet at Mount Vernon, where they are to be married in the presence of President Washington.

== Cast ==
- Marion Davies as Janice Meredith
- Holbrook Blinn as Lord Clowes
- Harrison Ford as Charles Fownes
- Macklyn Arbuckle as Squire Meredith
- Joseph Kilgour as General George Washington
- Hattie Delaro as Mrs. Meredith
- George Nash as Lord Howe
- Tyrone Power Sr. as Lord Cornwallis
- May Vokes as Susie
- W.C. Fields as A British Sergeant
- Olin Howland as Philemon
- Helen Lee Worthing as Mrs. Loring
- Spencer Charters as Squire Hennion
- Douglas Stevenson as Captain Mowbrary
- Lionel Adams as Thomas Jefferson
- Edwin Argus as Louis XVI
- Lee Beggs as Benjamin Franklin
- Nicolai Koesberg as Lafayette
- Ken Maynard as Paul Revere
- Burton McEvilly as Alexander Hamilton
- Harlan Knight as Theodore Larkin
- Walter Law as General Charles Lee
- Wilfred Noy as Dr. Joseph Warren
- Florence Turner as Maid

== Production ==
In her 19th film, Marion Davies starred as Janice Meredith in a story about the American Revolution. As with Yolanda, this film was not considered to be a hit, but the trade papers reported a record-breaking run at the Cosmopolitan Theater in New York. Exteriors were shot in New York with extended location shooting in Upstate New York. Hearst built a replica of Trenton, NJ, in Plattsburgh, and the Saranac River doubled for the Delaware. Other scenes were filmed on Lake Placid. Screenland noted that Hearst spent $80,000 on the recreation of the Battle of Lexington. The film received generally good reviews. The large cast included W.C. Fields in his feature film debut. Davies and Fields had worked together in the 1916 edition of the "Ziegfeld Follies."

== Survival status ==
The existing print is actually the British version, which was titled The Beautiful Rebel.

== See also ==
- List of films about the American Revolution
