= Emerson Hough =

American writer (1857–1923)

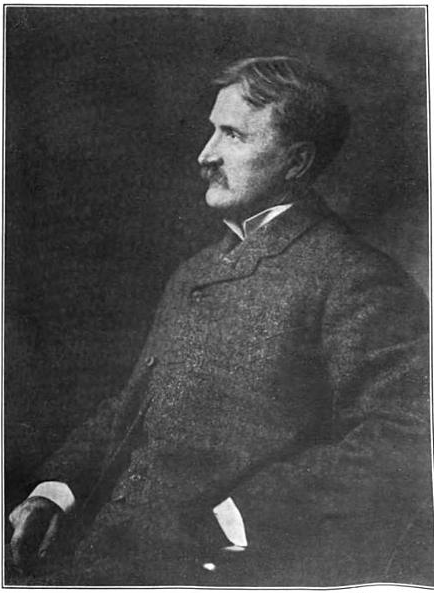
Emerson Hough circa 1909

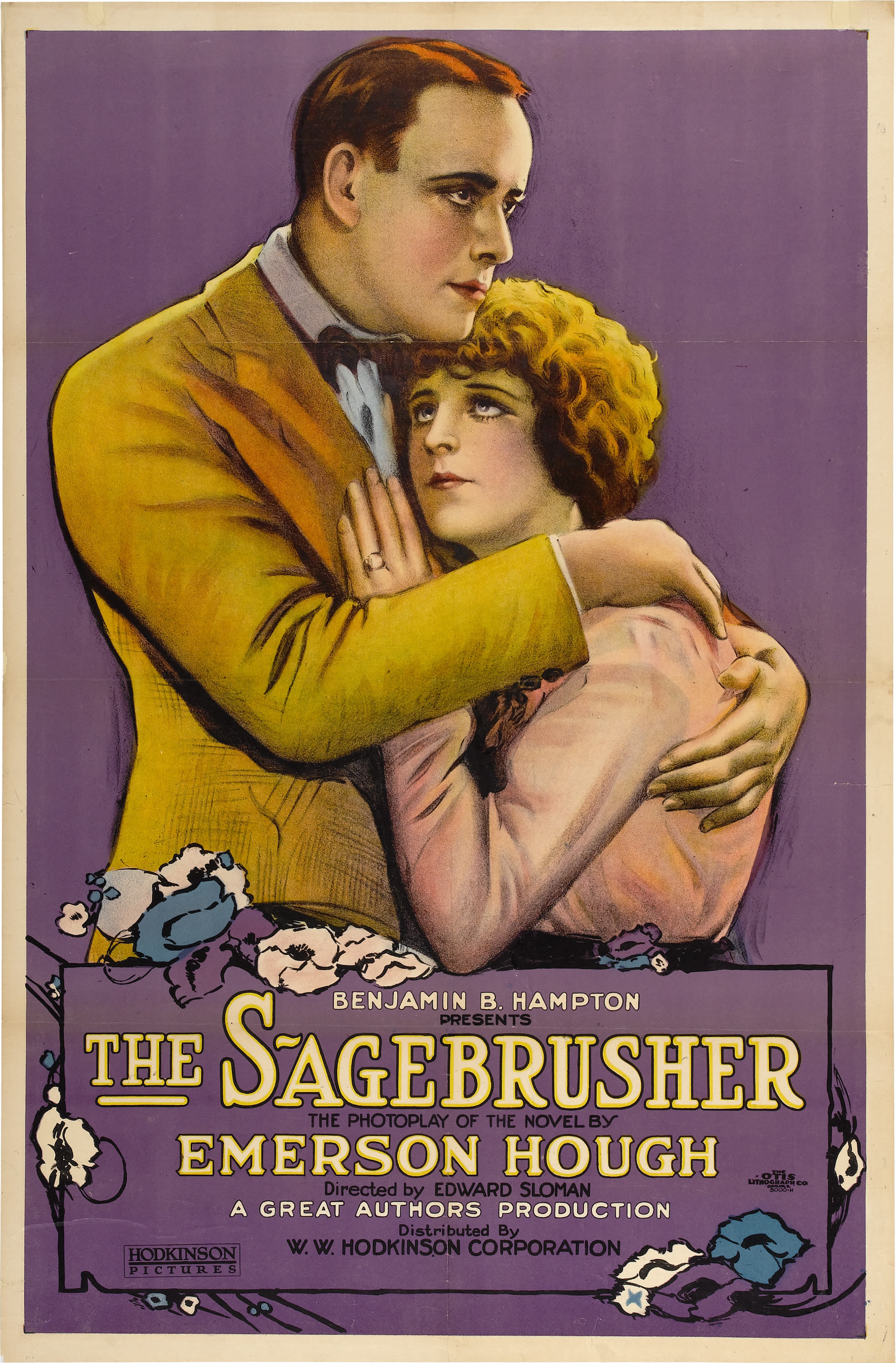
Poster for the movie adaptation of The Sagebrusher (1920)

Emerson Hough (June 28, 1857 – April 30, 1923) was an American writer best known for writing western stories and historical novels. His early works included Singing Mouse Stories and Story of the Cowboy. He was well known for his 1902 historical novel The Mississippi Bubble. Many of his works have been adapted into films and serial films.

== Career ==
Hough was born in Newton, Iowa on June 28, 1857. He was in Newton High School's first graduating class of three in 1875. He graduated from the University of Iowa with a bachelor's degree in philosophy in 1880 and later studied law and was admitted to the bar in 1882. His first article, "Far From The Madding Crowd," was published in Forest and Stream in 1882.

He moved to White Oaks, New Mexico, practiced law there, and wrote for the White Oaks newspaper Golden Era for a year and a half, returning to Iowa when his mother was ill. He later wrote Story of the Outlaw, A Study of the Western Desperado, which included profiles of Billy the Kid and Pat Garrett. Hough moved to New Mexico after Garrett shot Billy the Kid, and he became a friend of Garrett. He wrote for various newspapers in Des Moines, Iowa, Sandusky, Ohio, Chicago, Illinois, St. Louis, Missouri, and Wichita, Kansas. In 1889 he got a position as western editor of Forest and Stream, editing the "Chicago and the West" column. He was hired by George Bird Grinnell, the owner of Field and Stream, who founded the Audubon Society in 1886 which, along with Theodore Roosevelt's Boone and Crockett Club, was a leader in the conservation movement.

Hough was also a conservationist. One of his projects for Forest and Stream was to survey Yellowstone National Park in midwinter 1893, with a guide and 2 soldiers from the nearby fort of the same name. There were supposed to be more than 500 buffalo there, but their count barely reached 100. Due to Hough's report, eastern newspapers took up the cause against poaching, and in May 1894 the U.S. Congress passed a law making poaching of game in national parks a punishable offense. Later, he and other Saturday Evening Post writers wrote a letter for Stephen Mather and George Horace Latimer to sign, advocating the creation of a national park system. The National Park Service was created in 1916. In addition, he was a co-founder of the Izaak Walton League, an organization of outdoorsmen, in 1922. He wrote the "Out-of-Doors" column for the Saturday Evening Post and these columns later appeared in book form.

In 1902, Hough began his association with Bobbs-Merrill Company (then Bowen-Merrill), which published his first best-seller, The Mississippi Bubble. Hough began a trilogy on America when he published 54-40 or Fight in 1909, dedicated to Theodore Roosevelt. He dedicated the second volume, Purchase Price, to U.S. Senator Albert Beveridge of Indiana in 1910 and the third, John Rawn, to Woodrow Wilson in 1912. He nevertheless campaigned for Theodore Roosevelt, candidate of the Bull Moose Party, in the 1912 presidential election.

Reviewers noted the political nature of Hough's Western fiction. One reviewer wrote that John Rawn was "not a novel at all; it is an arraignment; it is propaganda" for progressive Republicans or the Democrats. It condemned protective tariffs and presented consistently negative portrait of money-driven characters. The review was positive, praising the novelist's portrait of his main character, but little else. Hough "makes his point, and hammers it hard. He leaves nothing for the reader to guess....He goes at it all with bludgeon and battle-ax....He has, as a fighter, a strong style. His book is well worth reading. But it is not art." Hough responded at length and with good humor, citing widely divergent views of the novel. He explained that a story of "blackguards and traitors" should not lead anyone to the conclusion that he believes such characters typify American society, rather that "imitation of blackguards and traitors is not a fit ambition for Americans."

He took a public position during the election of 1916, adding his name to a letter sent on behalf of the Roosevelt Authors' League pledging support to Theodore Roosevelt because "the international crisis makes your re-election to the Presidency essential to the ultimate welfare of our country." It praised "the splendid fight you are making for Americanism" and had harsh words for the administration of Woodrow Wilson.

His other notable works included Story of the Cowboy, "which received a high recommendation from President Theodore Roosevelt," Way of the West, Singing Mouse Stories, and The Passing of the Frontier. Among his historical novels, The Magnificent Adventure in 1916 was set at the time of the Louisiana Purchase and the Lewis and Clark Expedition and told, said one reviewer, "a good stirring tale."

In 1889 Hough wrote Madre D'Oro, a four-act spectacular drama about the Spanish conquest of the Aztecs. With L. Frank Baum, author of The Wonderful Wizard of Oz, he created two play treatments: The Maid of Athens: A College Phantasy and The King of Gee-Whiz. Neither was ever completed or staged.

He also wrote autobiographical works, such as "Getting a Wrong Start", published anonymously as a serial in the Saturday Evening Post in 1913. It appeared in book form two years later. He then wrote "Emerson Hough Himself-by Himself" for the Post in 1917.

Hough wrote the official account of the activities of the American Protective League (APL), a voluntary organization that attempted to enforce patriotism and stifle dissent during World War I. Called The Web: A Revelation of Patriotism, it told the history of that controversial organization in glowing terms and called for a program of "selective immigration, deportation of un-Americans, and denaturalization of 'disloyal' citizens and anarchists." It said: "We must purify the source of America's population and keep it pure." When the APL organized teams of vigilantes to enforce the military draft, Hough described the places the organization was most needed: "We find that the great states of each coast are practically foreign – New York most of all." During the war he wrote a pamphlet for a similar organization, the American Defense Society, called The Indefinite American Attitude Toward the War and When Shall It End.

== Personal life ==
He married Charlotte Chesebro of Chicago in 1897 and made that city his home. During World War I, he served as a captain with the Intelligence Service. He died in Evanston, Illinois, on April 30, 1923, a week after seeing the Chicago premiere of the movie The Covered Wagon, based on his 1922 book. Covered Wagon was his biggest best-selling novel since Mississippi Bubble in 1902. North of 36, another Hough novel, later became a popular silent film as well, "making him one of the first Western authors to enter into the motion picture industry." He is buried in Galesburg, Illinois.

Asked in 1918 to provide some details of his own life, he replied in the context of World War I: "This is no time for autobiography of men of letters. This is the day of biography for men who have been privileged to act in the great scenes of today. It is the time for boys of 23. At least we can bless them and back them the best we know. I will not tell about myself. It is of no consequence." Hough died in Evanston on April 30, 1923.

== Later recognition ==
Hough's hometown, Newton, Iowa, has honored him in several ways. A school named for him opened in 1926. Emerson Hough Elementary School was listed on the National Register of Historic Places in 2002. His boyhood home bears a marker provided by the Daughters of the American Revolution. The school grounds include a playground with a western theme called Fort Emerson Hough. The local chapter of the Izaak Walton League also bears his name, as does a street, Emerson Hough Avenue, in Lambs Grove, Iowa, a suburb of Newton.

In March 2010, the school board voted to close Emerson Hough Elementary School. Efforts to prevent its closure included a fund raising and a Facebook page. Although the building was closed to students, it was still in use serving as the school's administration complex, the alternative high school Basics and Beyond, the AEA and the Newton preschool program. Before the start of the 2016 - 2017 school year, board members reconfigured the district's buildings to allow for four K-4 elementary schools and a 5-8 middle school. The move included reopening Emerson Hough Elementary School as a school.

== Works ==
- Singing Mouse Stories, 1895
- Story of the Cowboy, 1897
- Girl at the Halfway House, 1900
- The Mississippi Bubble, 1902
- Way to the West, 1903
- Law of the Land, 1904
- Heart's Desire, 1905
- King of Gee-Whiz, 1906
- Story of the Outlaw, 1906
- The Way of a Man, 1907
- 54-40 or Fight, 1909
- The Sowing, 1909
- Young Alaskans, 1910
- The Purchase Price, 1910
- John Rawn, 1912
- Lady and the Pirate, 1913
- Out of Doors, 1913
- Young Alaskans in the Rockies, 1913
- Young Alaskans on the Trail, 1914
- Getting a Wrong Start (Autobiography), 1915
- The Man Next Door, 1916
- Magnificent Adventure, 1916
- Let Us Go Afield, 1916
- The Broken Gate, 1917
- The Way Out, 1918
- Passing of the Frontier, 1918
- Young Alaskans in the Far North, 1918
- The Web, 1919
- The Sagebrusher, 1919
- Maw's Vacation 1921
- An Appreciation of Yellowstone National Park, 1922[?]
- The Covered Wagon, 1922
- Young Alaskans on the Missouri, 1922
- North of 36, 1923
- Mother of Gold, 1924
- The Ship of Souls, 1925

== Filmography ==
- The Broken Coin, directed by Francis Ford (1915, serial, based on a story by Emerson Hough)
- The Campbells Are Coming, directed by Francis Ford (1915, based on a story by Emerson Hough)
- The Sagebrusher, directed by Edward Sloman (1920, based on the novel The Sagebrusher)
- The Broken Gate, directed by Paul Scardon (1920, based on the novel The Broken Gate)
- The Covered Wagon, directed by James Cruze (1923, based on the novel The Covered Wagon)
- The Man Next Door, directed by Victor Schertzinger (1923, based on the novel The Man Next Door)
- The Way of a Man, directed by George B. Seitz (1924, serial, based on a story by Emerson Hough)
- North of 36, directed by Irvin Willat (1924, based on the novel North of 36)
- The Ship of Souls, directed by Charles Miller (1925, based on the novel The Ship of Souls)
- One Hour of Love, directed by Robert Florey (1927, based on a story by Emerson Hough)
- The Broken Gate, directed by James C. McKay (director) (1927, based on the novel The Broken Gate)
- The Conquering Horde, directed by Edward Sloman (1931, based on the novel North of 36)
- The Texans, directed by James P. Hogan (1938, based on the novel North of 36)

== Sources ==
- Emerson Hough by Delbert Wylder (1981)
