= The Shuttle (novel) =

Novel by Frances Hodgson Burnett

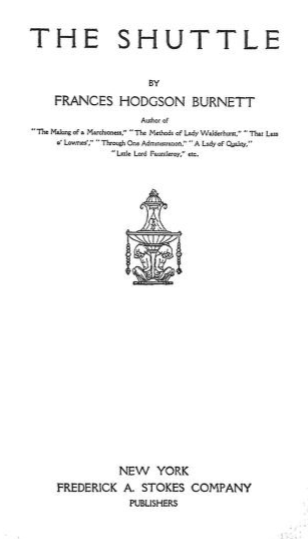
- Title page for The Shuttle (1907)
- Author: Frances Hodgson Burnett
- Language: English
- Published: 1907

The Shuttle is a 1907 novel by Frances Hodgson Burnett. One of Burnett's longer and more complicated books for adults, it deals with themes of intermarriages between wealthy American heiresses and impoverished British nobles.

== Plot summary ==
Sir Nigel Anstruthers comes to New York in search of an heiress, as he no longer has enough money to keep up his estate, Stornham Court. He marries the pretty and cosseted Rosalie Vanderpoel, the daughter of an American millionaire. But on their return to England, Nigel and his mother control and isolate Rosalie from her family. Many years later, Rosalie's now-grown up sister Bettina, who has spent a decade wondering why Rosy has lost contact with the family, arrives at Stornham Court to investigate. She discovers Rosalie and her son Ughtred, physically and emotionally fragile, living in the ruined estate. Bettina, who is both beautiful and made of considerably stronger stuff than her sister, begins to restore both Rosalie's health and spirits and the building and grounds of Stornham Court in Nigel's absence. Bettina, as an attractive heiress, attracts the attention of the local gentry and re-integrates her sister into society, while also gaining the respect of the villagers by her insistence that repairs be done by local workers.

Bettina also makes the acquaintance of another impoverished English nobleman, Lord Mount Dunstan, who has considerably more pride and spirit than Sir Nigel and has no intention of marrying an American heiress to restore his estate, but who is not well-respected in the neighborhood due to his disreputable late father and brother. Mount Dunstan regains the respect of the neighborhood due to a chance encounter with an American typewriter salesman on holiday, G. Seldon, and because he opens his estate to workers afflicted by typhoid fever. When Sir Nigel returns home to discover Rosalie and Ughtred in improved health and spirits, the estate nearly restored, and Betty responsible for it all, he tries to conceal his ill-will but has never been particularly good at self-control. In a final confrontation, Nigel attempts to bully Bettina into leaving Rosalie at Stornham Court, this time with more of her father's money, but she hides from him and eventually returns with Mount Dunstan, who she had believed dead of typhus. Mount Dunstan whips Sir Nigel "like a dog," and the latter eventually suffers a fit and dies, while Bettina and Mount Dunstan overcome their pride and confess their love for each other.

== Major themes ==
The title of the book refers to ships passing back and forth across the Atlantic and creating alliances between England and America like the weaving of a shuttle: "As Americans discovered Europe, that continent discovered America. American beauties began to appear in English drawing-rooms and Continental salons... What could be more a matter of course than that American women, being aided by adoring fathers sumptuously to ship themselves to other lands, should begin to rule these lands also?" Burnett made the transatlantic voyage thirty-three times, which was a lot for the era.

Marriages between English aristocrats and American heiresses were common and of considerable public interest at the time. Some of the best known of these alliances was between Jennie Jerome and Lord Randolph Churchill, who were the parents of Winston Churchill, and between Consuelo Vanderbilt and the 9th Duke of Marlborough in 1895. Burnett would have read the gossip around the marriage of the Marlboroughs and other sources, such as Titled Americans: A list of American ladies who have married foreigners of rank, which included: ‘A carefully compiled List of Peers Who are Supposed to be eager to lay their coronets, and incidentally their hearts, at the feet of the all-conquering American Girl.’

The building and grounds of ‘Stornham Court’ were modelled after Great Maytham Hall, near Rolvenden in Kent, which had a beautiful garden that Bettina starts restoring in The Shuttle and which also inspired the titular garden of The Secret Garden.

Angelica Shirley Carpenter writes in In the Garden, Essays in Honor of Frances Hodgson Burnett that Burnett's depiction of Sir Nigel's abuse of Rosalie mirrors the abuse that Burnett herself suffered at the hands of her second husband Stephen: "All the classic signs of abuse, which were not so well-known in Frances's lifetime, are catalogued in The Shuttle. Sir Nigel isolates Rosalie from her family and friends, refusing to let her parents see her when they visit England. Stephen tried this with Frances too."

== Publication history ==
Burnett began writing The Shuttle in 1900, but did not finish it until several years later. In the meantime, she wrote several other books, including The Making of a Marchioness and its sequel The Methods of Lady Walderhurst. Both The Shuttle and The Making of a Marchioness were republished in 2007 by Persephone Books.

The Shuttle is on the Publishers Weekly list of bestselling novels in the United States for 1907 and 1908.

The Shuttle was made into a silent film of the same title in 1918 by Margaret Turnbull and Harvey Thew, and featured Constance Talmadge as Bettina Vanderpoel, Edith Johnson as Rosalie Vanderpoel, Edwin B. Tilton as Reuben Vanderpoel, Helen Dunbar as Mrs. Vanderpoel, George A. McDaniel as Sir Nigel Anstruthers, Albert Roscoe as Lord Mount Dunstan, Thomas Persse as Penzance, Edward Peil Sr. as Ughtred Anstruthers, and Casson Ferguson as G. Selden. It was directed by Rollin S. Sturgeon for Select Pictures.
