= Maurice Thompson =

American poet

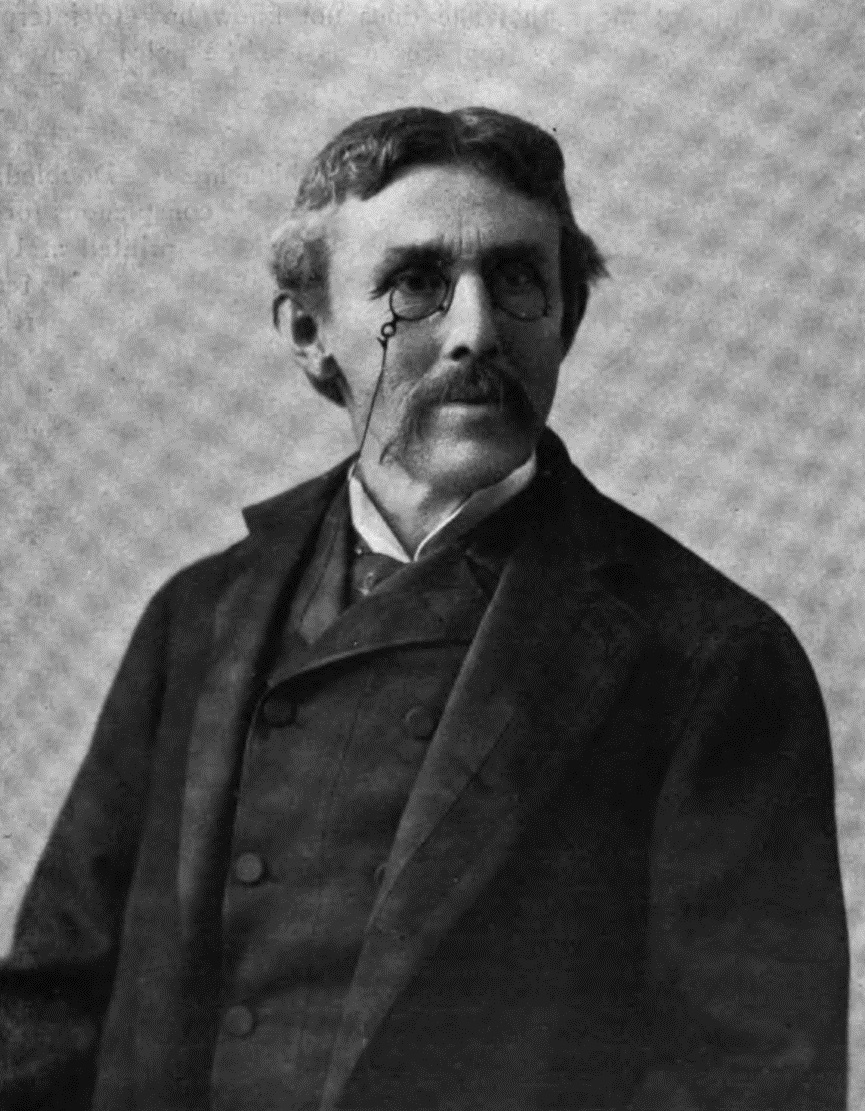
- Born: James Maurice Thompson; September 9, 1844; Fairfield, Indiana, U.S.
- Died: February 15, 1901 (aged 56)

James Maurice Thompson (September 9, 1844 – February 15, 1901) was an American novelist, poet, essayist, archer and naturalist.

== Biography ==
James Maurice Thompson was born in 1844 in the former town of Fairfield, Indiana, located in Franklin County to a Baptist minister and his wife. Near the end of the decade, the family moved to northern Georgia. He was educated by tutors in the classical languages, literature, French and mathematics; he used his mathematical training to advantage by becoming a civil engineer.

During the Civil War, Maurice Thompson and his brother Will Henry Thompson (born 1848) fought as privates in the Confederate Army.

After the war, Thompson took up residence in Calhoun, Georgia, where he studied surveying, engineering, and the law. He lived in Calhoun for two years, and began publishing the first of his articles while living there.

In 1867 Thompson began a botanical and ornithological survey of Lake Okeechobee in Florida. After finishing this work, Thompson and his brother moved to Crawfordsville, Indiana. Maurice began working as an engineer on a railroad being built in the area, and the Thompson brothers married sisters.

In 1871 the brothers opened a law office together. In 1873 Maurice resumed submitting articles for publication (Atlantic Monthly published his first), after which he undertook a series of articles on archery. He was published in New York Tribune, Atlantic Monthly, and Harper's Monthly. His first book appeared in 1875 and over the ensuing years he wrote in different genres, including novels and poetry.

Thompson was elected to the Indiana State Legislature in 1879. His brother Will moved to Seattle, Washington and became Western Counsel for the Great Northern Railroad, and remained active in Confederate affairs, as well as publishing a poem, "High Tide at Gettysburg". Thompson was the State Geologist of Indiana from 1885 to 1888.

== Writing ==
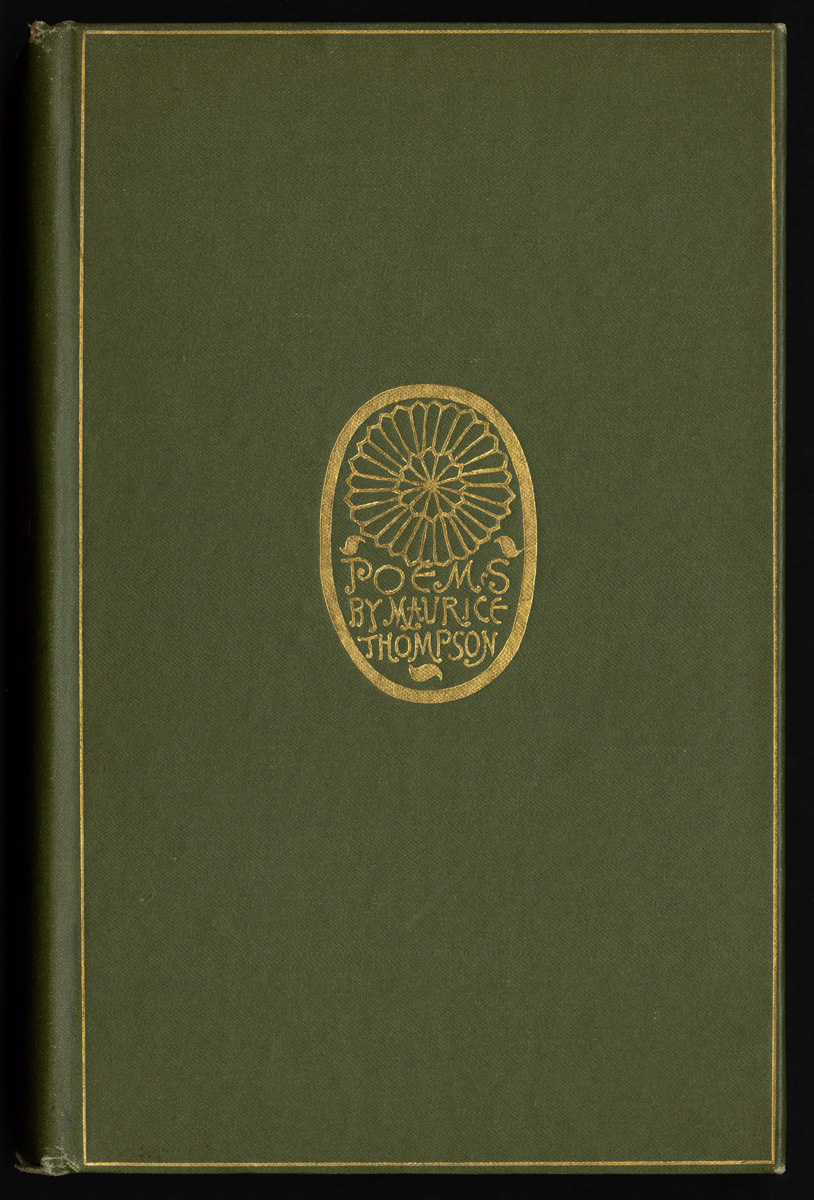
Poems, 1892

Thompson became well known as a local colorist, with works ranging from local history to archery. His first book, Hoosier Mosaics, published in 1875, was a collection of short stories illustrating the people and atmosphere of small Indiana towns. He followed it with a successful compilation of his published essays, The Witchery of Archery, which was well received for its wit and use of common language. At this same time, Thompson also published several collections of naturalistic poetry, though they weren't well received at the time.

Thompson wrote the poem "To the South" that was reprinted in George Washington Cable's influential and controversial essay, "The Freedmen's Case in Equity" in 1885. This poem expressed Thompson's reaction to the freeing of the slaves, and implied that some other Southerners were not as angry about the overturning of that institution as Northerners presumed. Rutherford B. Hayes, in 1892, read eight lines from Thompson's "An Address by an Ex-Confederate Soldier to the Grand Army of the Republic", calling him "the finest poet of the Confederacy".

Through the 1880s, Thompson moved into the realm of fiction. His early works featured the common thread of simple southern life, taken mostly from Thompson's childhood. With his 1886 semi-autobiographical novel, A Banker of Bankersville, he returned to his Indiana roots. Arguably his most successful and well-known novel was Alice of Old Vincennes. The novel vividly depicted Indiana during the Revolutionary War.

== Death ==
Thompson died shortly after publication of Alice of Old Vincennes, on February 15, 1901, of pneumonia, aged 56.

== Bibliography ==
This bibliography may not be complete.

- Poems (1872–1892)
- Hoosier Mosaics (1875)
- The Witchery of Archery (1878)
- How to train in Archery (With Will Henry Thompson)(1879)
- A Tallahassee Girl (1882)
- Songs of Fair Weather (1883)
- His Second Campaign (1883)
- Byways and Bird Notes (1885)
- At Love's Extremes (1885) (reissued as Milly: At Love's Extremes in 1901)
- A Banker of Bankersville (1886)
- Sylvan Secrets in Bird-Songs and Brooks (1887)
- The Story of Louisiana (1888)
- A Fortnight of Folly (1888)
- The King of Honey Island (1892)
- Ethics of Literary Art (1893)
- Sweetheart Manette (1894)
- The Ocala Boy (1895)
- Stories of the Cherokee Hills (1898)
- Stories of Indiana (1898)
- Alice of Old Vincennes (1900)
- My Winter Garden (1900)
- Rosalynde's Lovers (1901)
