= Paul Leicester Ford =

American novelist and biographer (1865–1902)

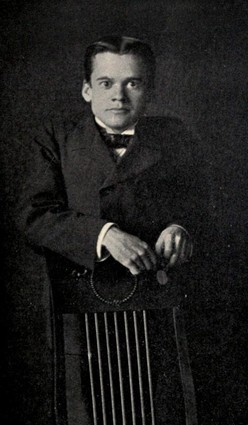
- Paul Leicester Ford (1902)
- Born: March 23, 1865; Brooklyn, New York, US
- Died: May 8, 1902 (aged 37); New York City, US
- Occupations: Novelist and biographer
- Spouse: Grace Kidder
- Children: 1

Paul Leicester Ford (March 23, 1865 – May 8, 1902) was an American novelist and biographer, born in Brooklyn, the son of Gordon Lester Ford and Emily Fowler Ford (a granddaughter of Noah Webster and lifelong friend of Emily Dickinson).

== Life and work ==
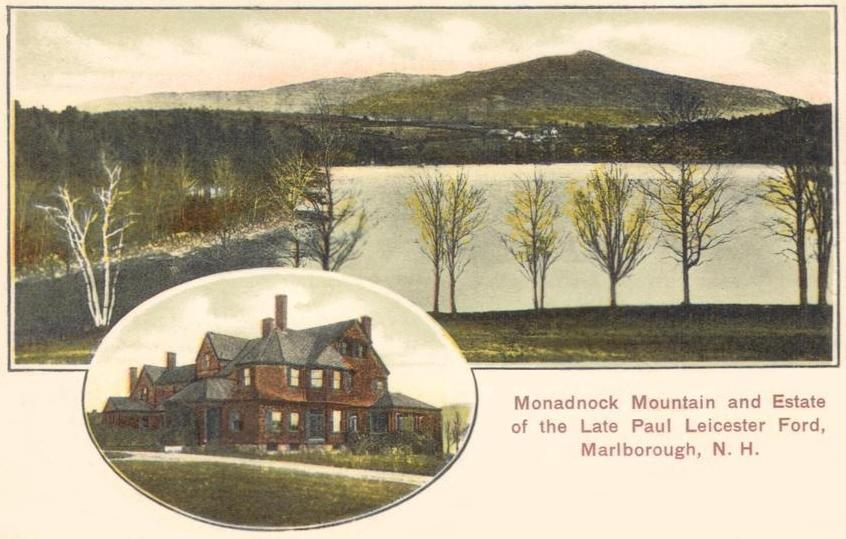
Merrywood, Ford's estate on Stone Pond in Marlborough, New Hampshire

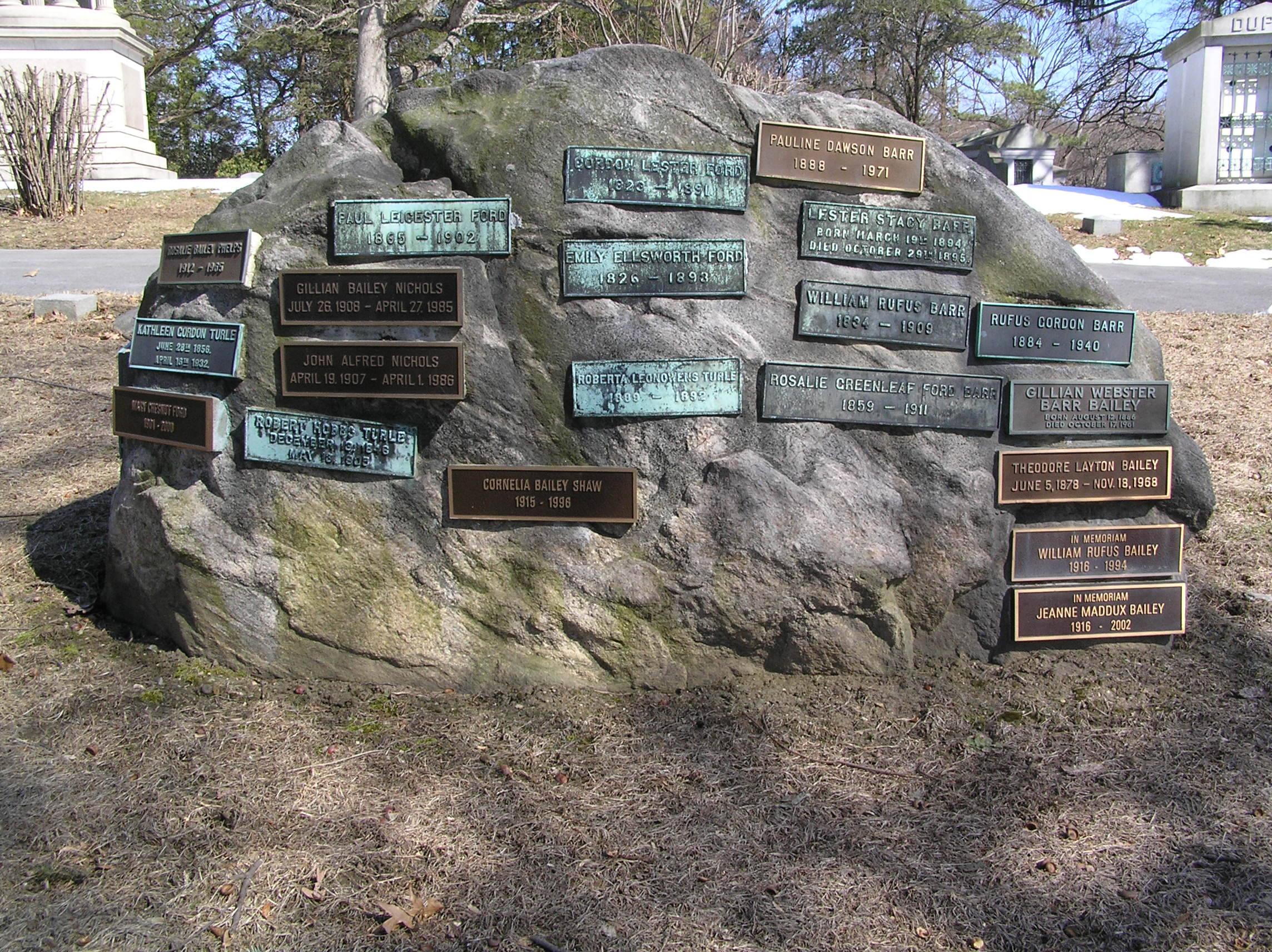
Gravesite of Paul Leicester Ford

Ford was the great-grandson of Noah Webster and the brother of historian Worthington C. Ford. He wrote of the lives of George Washington, Benjamin Franklin, and others, edited the works of Thomas Jefferson, and wrote a number of novels which had considerable success, including The Honorable Peter Stirling, Story of an Untold Love, Janice Meredith, Wanted a Matchmaker, and Wanted a Chaperon.

Ford's edition of The Writings of Thomas Jefferson is still regarded as one of the monuments of American historical scholarship, setting the standard for documentary editing for half a century until the appearance of the first volume of The Papers of Thomas Jefferson, edited by Julian P. Boyd. Ford's edition remains valuable for its accuracy of transcription from original manuscripts and its careful annotation of the documents chosen for publication. The Ford edition appeared in two versions, a 10 volume edition published between 1892 and 1896 and a 12 volume limited numbered edition issued in 1904, known as the "Federal" edition.

Ford was an elected member of the American Philosophical Society.

Ford was a close personal friend of George Washington Vanderbilt II. He often visited Vanderbilt at Biltmore Estate where they read, played chess and enjoyed the outdoors. Vanderbilt dedicated a stained glass window to Ford at the church Vanderbilt had built at Biltomre, the Cathedral of All Souls (Asheville, North Carolina).

Ford was murdered in his Manhattan home by his brother Malcolm Webster Ford, at one time the most famous amateur athlete in the United States, who then committed suicide. The brothers were buried at Sleepy Hollow Cemetery in Sleepy Hollow, New York, in the same grave; the decision for the same grave was made by the families to signal the end of their familial feud.

== Works ==
- The works of Thomas Jefferson (1904-1905)
- The True George Washington (1907)
- The Many-sided Franklin (1899)
- The Honorable Peter Stirling (1894)
- Story of an Untold Love (1897)
- Story of an Untold Love New York: Dodd, Mead and Co., 1897
- Janice Meredith (1899)
- Wanted a Matchmaker (1901)
- Wanted a Chaperon (1902)
