= Irving Bacheller =

American journalist and writer

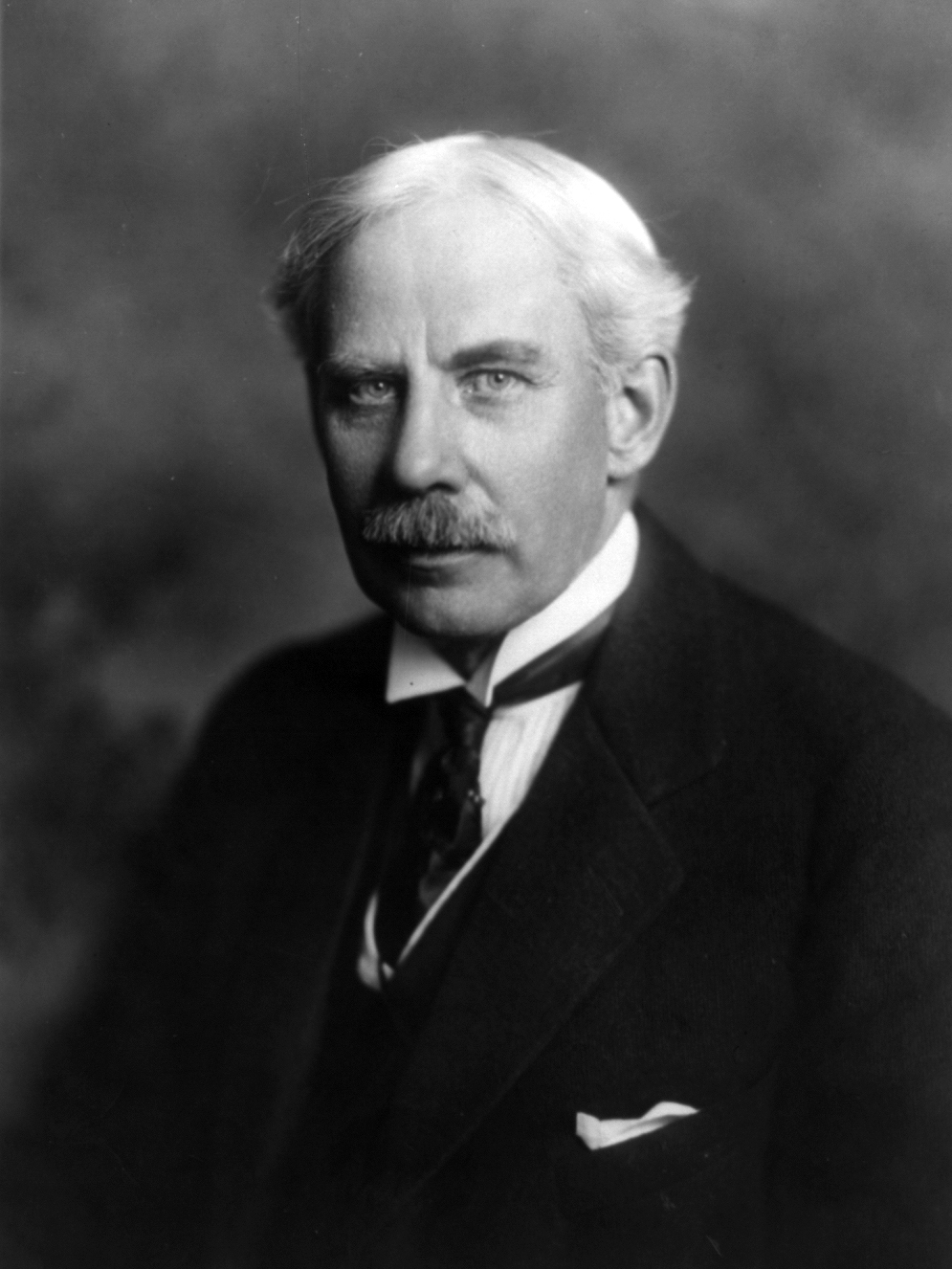
- Born: September 26, 1859; Pierrepont, New York
- Died: February 24, 1950 (aged 90); White Plains, New York
- Education: St. Lawrence University
- Occupations: Writer, journalist
- Writing career
- Notable work: Eben Holden

Addison Irving Bacheller (September 26, 1859 – February 24, 1950) was an American journalist and writer. He founded the first modern newspaper syndicate in the United States.

== Birth and education ==
Born in Pierrepont, New York, Irving Bacheller graduated from St. Lawrence University in 1882 after which he accepted a job with the Daily Hotel Reporter; by 1883 he was working for the Brooklyn Daily Times. Two years later, he established a business to provide specialized articles to the major Sunday newspapers. It was through the Bacheller Syndicate that he brought to American readers the writings of British authors such as Joseph Conrad, Arthur Conan Doyle, and Rudyard Kipling. He also established a working partnership with the young author and journalist Stephen Crane, whose novel The Red Badge of Courage became famous after it appeared in syndication. Several years later, Bacheller hired Crane to act as a war correspondent in Cuba during the insurrection against Spain; on the journey there, Crane's ship foundered off the coast of Florida, and he was stranded on a dinghy for two days. This experience resulted in his short story "The Open Boat".

== Novels ==
Irving Bacheller began to write fiction, publishing The Master of Silence in 1892 and Still House of O'Darrow in 1894. Although he was appointed Sunday editor of the New York World in 1898, he soon chose to pursue a full-time career as a fiction writer and two years later left journalism for a while. Writing novels primarily concerned with early American life in the North Country of New York State, in 1900 his novel Eben Holden, subtitled A Tale of the North Country, proved a major success, and was the fourth best-selling novel in the United States in 1900. In 1901 the book was still ranked fifth for the year and his next novel issued that year titled D'ri and I was tenth in annual sales. Sixteen years later, Bacheller's work The Light in the Clearing was the second best-selling book in America and in 1920, A Man for the Ages was fifth.

== Civic activities ==
Although he continued to write novels, Bacheller also served as a war correspondent in France during World War I. In later years, he served on the board of trustees of both St. Lawrence University and Rollins College in Winter Park, Florida where he built a home, called Gate o' the Isles, and spent his winters from 1919 through 1940. St. Lawrence's Gunninson Memorial Chapel bells are named "The Bacheller Memorial Chimes" in his honor. Additionally, the St Lawrence English department's honorary society is named for him, and one of the dining halls bears the name "Eben Holden".

== Rollins College ==
Bacheller had a major role in the development of Rollins College when, in 1925, he was named head of a search committee to find a new president for the school. He remembered a magazine editor he had known and admired in New York, Hamilton Holt, and he wrote to Holt offering him the job saying, "It's a cinch for a man of your capacity." Holt took the job and changed Rollins College, with the help of Bacheller, from a tiny school with very little money, to a school with a multimillion-dollar endowment and a beautiful, thriving campus. In 1940, with Holt still president, Rollins College announced the creation of a professorship of creative writing in Irving Bacheller's name.

== Later years ==
Irving Bacheller died in White Plains, New York in 1950. In recent years, several of his works have been reprinted and a previously unpublished manuscript, titled Lost in the Fog, was published in 1990.

== Bibliography ==
- The Master of Silence (1892)
- Still House of O'Darrow (1894)
- Best Things From American Literature (1899)
- Eben Holden: A Tale of the North Country (1900)
- D'ri and I (1901)
- The Story of a Passion (1901), published by the Roycrofters of Elbert Hubbard
- Darrel of the Blessed Isles (1903)
- Vergilius (1904)
- Silas Strong: Emperor of the Woods (1906)
- Eben Holden's Last Day a-Fishing (1907)
- The Hand Made Gentleman: A Tale of the Battles of Peace (1909)
- The Master (1909 Doubleday, Page & Company)
- Keeping up with Lizzie (1911)
- "Charge It" Or Keeping Up With Harry (1912)
- The Turning of Griggsby: Being a Story of Keeping Up with Daniel Webster (1913)
- The Marryers: a History Gathered From a Brief of the Honorable Socrates Potter (1914)
- The Light in the Clearing (1917)
- Keeping Up With William (1918)
- A Man for the Ages (1919)
- The Prodigal Village: a Christmas Tale (1920)
- In the Days of Poor Richard (1922)
- The Scudders: a Story of Today (1923)
- Father Abraham (1925)
- From Stores of Memory (1938)
- The House of the Three Ganders (1928)
- Coming Up The Road (1928)
- A Candle in the Wilderness: A Tale of the Beginning of New England (1930)
- The Master of Chaos (1932)
- Uncle Peel (1933)
- The Harvesting (1934)
- The Winds of God: A Tale of the North Country (1941)

== See also ==
- Jane Hicks Gentry
