= 1910s =

Decade of the Gregorian calendar (1910–1919)

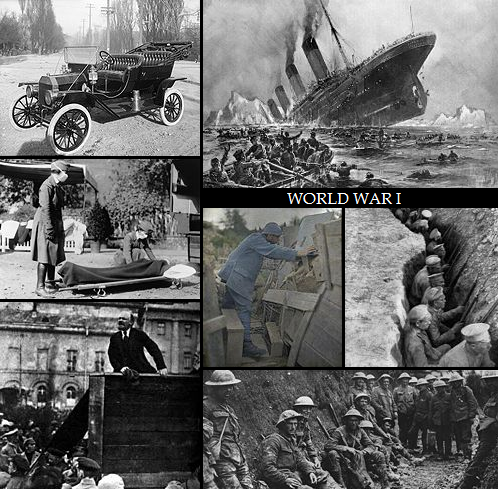
From left, clockwise: The Ford Model T is introduced in 1908 and becomes widespread in the 1910s; The sinking of the RMS Titanic in 1912 causes the deaths of nearly 1,500 people and attracts global and historical attention; CONTEXT: all the events below are part of World War I (1914–1918); French Army lookout at his observation post in 1917 in the Western Front; Russian troops awaiting a German attack in the Eastern Front; A ration party of the Royal Irish Rifles in a communication trench during the Battle of the Somme; Vladimir Lenin addresses a crowd in the midst of the Russian Revolution, beginning in 1917; The Spanish flu pandemic in 1918 kills tens of millions worldwide.

The 1910s (pronounced "nineteen-tens" often shortened to the "'10s" or the "Tens") was the decade that began on January 1, 1910, and ended on December 31, 1919.

The 1910s represented the climax of European militarism which had its beginnings during the second half of the 19th century. The conservative lifestyles during the first half of the decade, as well as the legacy of military alliances, were forever changed by the June 28, 1914, assassination of Archduke Franz Ferdinand, the heir presumptive to the Austro-Hungarian throne. The archduke's murder triggered a chain of events in which, within 33 days, World War I broke out in Europe on August 1, 1914. The conflict dragged on until a truce was declared on November 11, 1918, leading to the controversial and one-sided Treaty of Versailles, signed on June 28, 1919.

The war's end triggered the abdication of various monarchies and the collapse of four of the last modern empires of Russia, Germany, Ottoman Turkey, and Austria-Hungary, with the latter splintered into Austria, Hungary, southern Poland (who acquired most of their land in a war with Soviet Russia), Czechoslovakia, and Yugoslavia, as well as the unification of Romania with Transylvania and Bessarabia. (Note: See Dissolution of Austria-Hungary § Successor states for better description of composition of names of successor countries following the splinter.) However, each of these states (with the possible exception of Yugoslavia) had large German and Hungarian minorities, creating some unexpected problems that would be brought to light in the next two decades.

The decade was also a period of revolution in many countries. The Portuguese 5 October 1910 revolution, which ended the eight-century-long monarchy, spearheaded the trend, followed by the Mexican Revolution in November 1910, which led to the ousting of dictator Porfirio Díaz, developing into a violent civil war that dragged on until mid-1920, not long after a new Mexican Constitution was signed and ratified. The Russian Empire had a similar fate, since its participation in World War I led it to a social, political, and economical collapse which made the tsarist autocracy unsustainable and, succeeding the events of 1905, culminated in the Russian Revolution and the establishment of the Russian Soviet Federative Socialist Republic, under the direction of the Bolshevik Party, later renamed as the Communist Party of the Soviet Union. The Russian Revolution of 1917, known as the October Revolution, was followed by the Russian Civil War, which dragged on until approximately late 1922. China saw 2,000 years of imperial rule ended with the Xinhai Revolution, becoming a nominal republic until Yuan Shikai's failed attempt to restore the monarchy and his death started the Warlord Era in 1916.

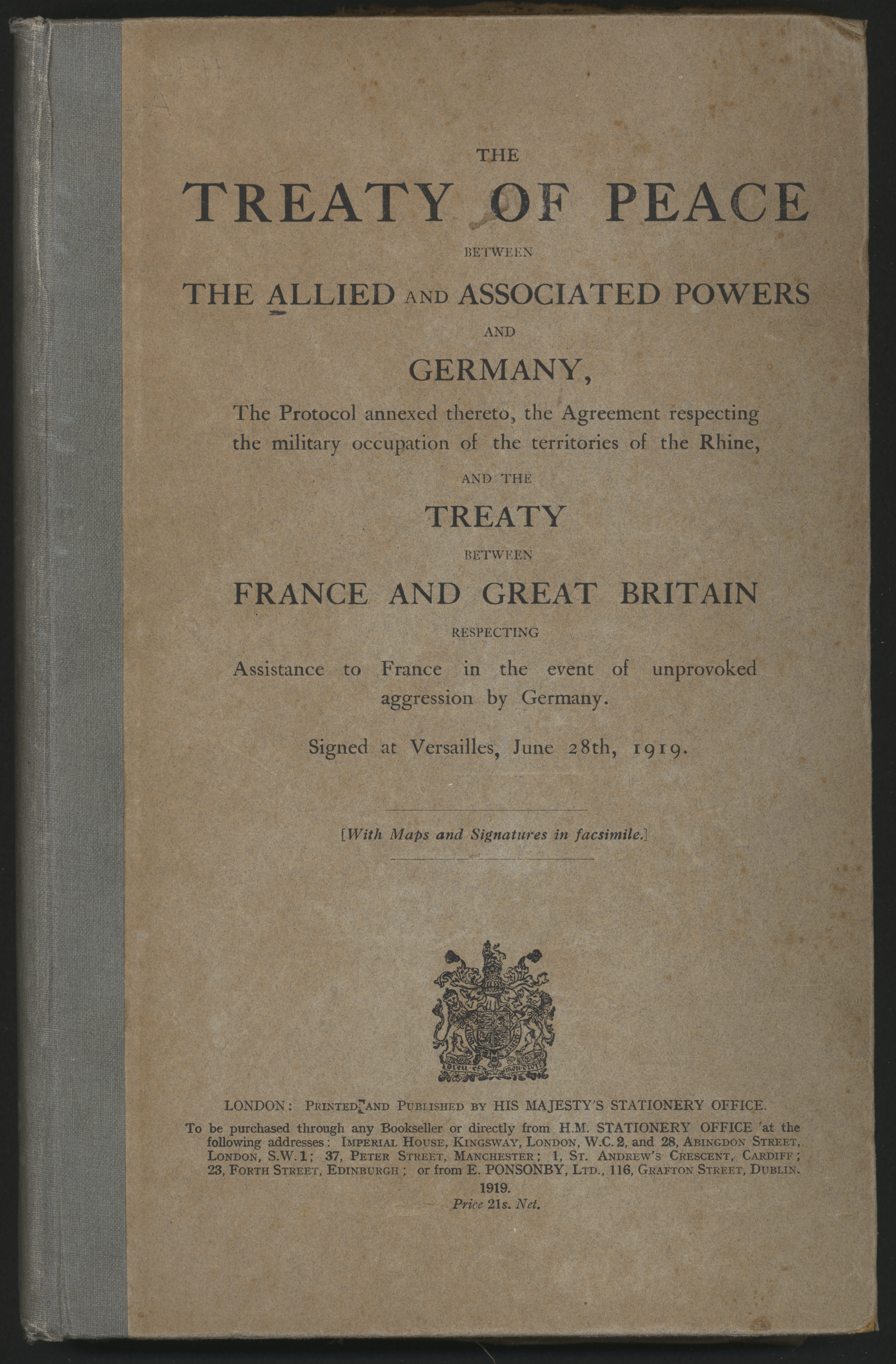
Treaty of Versailles

Much of the music in these years was ballroom-themed. Many of the fashionable restaurants were equipped with dance floors. Prohibition in the United States began January 16, 1919, with the ratification of the Eighteenth Amendment to the U.S. Constitution. Best-selling books of this decade include The Inside of the Cup, Seventeen, Mr. Britling Sees It Through, and The Four Horsemen of the Apocalypse.

During the 1910s, the world population increased from 1.75 to 1.87 billion, with approximately 640 million births and 500 million deaths in total.

== Politics and wars ==
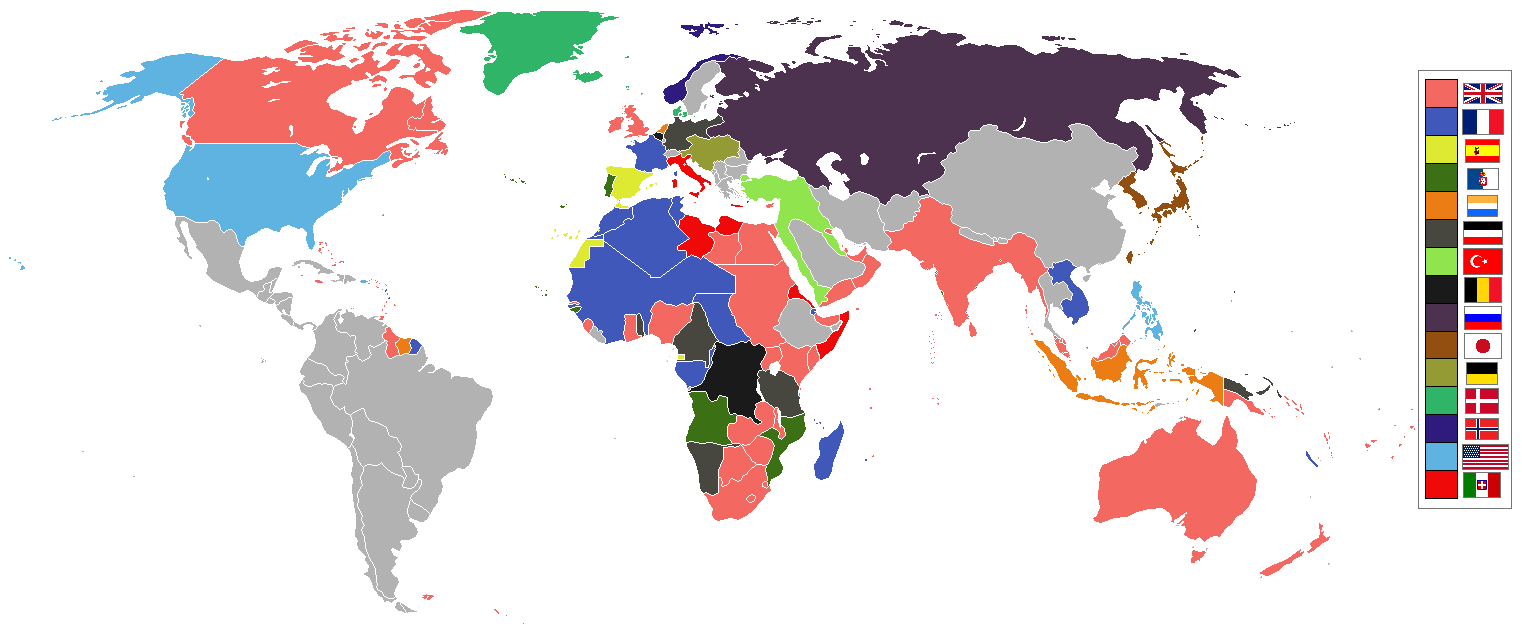
World map showing all empires and colonies in 1914, just before World War I.

=== Wars ===
- World War I (1914–1918)
  - The assassination of Archduke Franz Ferdinand of Austria-Hungary in Sarajevo leads to the outbreak of the First World War.
  - The Armenian genocide during and just after World War I. It was characterized by the use of massacres and deportations involving forced marches under conditions designed to lead to the death of the deportees, with the total number of Armenian deaths generally held to have been between one and one-and-a-half million.
  - The Arab Revolt was an armed uprising of Arabs against the Ottoman Empire.
  - Germany signs the Treaty of Versailles after losing the First World War.
- Wadai War (1909–1911)
- Italo-Turkish War (1911–1912)
- Balkan Wars (1912–1913) – two wars that took place in South-eastern Europe in 1912 and 1913.
- Saudi-Ottoman War (1913)
- Latvian War of Independence (1918–1920) – a military conflict in Latvia between the Republic of Latvia and the Russian SFSR.
- Estonian War of Independence (1918–1920) – a military conflict in Estonia between the Republic of Estonia and the Russian SFSR.

=== Internal conflicts ===
- The October Revolution in Russia results in the overthrow of capitalism and the establishment of the world's first self-proclaimed socialist state; political upheaval in Russia culminating in the establishment of the Russian SFSR and the assassination of Emperor Nicholas II and the royal family.
- The Russian Revolution is the collective term for the series of revolutions in Russia in 1917, which destroyed the Tsarist autocracy and led to the creation of the Soviet Union. It led to the Russian Civil War and other conflicts such as the Finnish Civil War, the Ukrainian War of Independence and the Polish–Soviet War.
- The Jallianwala Bagh massacre (1919), at Amritsar in the Punjab Province of British India, sows the seeds of discontent and leads to the birth of the Indian independence movement.
- The Xinhai Revolution causes the overthrow of China's ruling Qing dynasty, and the establishment of the Republic of China. The Warlord Era (1916–1928) began.
- The Mexican Revolution (1910–1920) Francsico Madero proclaims the elections of 1910 null and void and calls for an armed revolution at 6 p.m. against the illegitimate presidency/dictatorship of Porfirio Díaz. The revolution led to the ousting of Díaz (who ruled from 1876 to 1880 and since 1884) six months later. The revolution progressively became a civil war with multiple factions and phases, culminating with the Mexican Constitution of 1917, but combat would persist for three more years.
- The German revolution of 1918–1919 is fought between the workers and soldiers at the tail end of World War I, leading to the creation of the Weimar-era Freikorps, paramilitary units that would be a decisive political force throughout the Weimar Era.

=== Major political change ===
Vladimir Lenin, Leader of the Bolshevik Party during the Russian Revolution

- Portugal became the first republican country in the century after the 5 October 1910 revolution, ending its long-standing monarchy and creating the First Portuguese Republic in 1911.
- Germany abolished its monarchy and established a new elected government, the Weimar Republic.
- Seventeenth Amendment to the United States Constitution is passed, requiring US senators to be directly elected rather than appointed by the state legislatures.
- Federal Reserve Act is passed in 1913 by the United States Congress, establishing a Central Bank in the US.
- On the death of Edward VII, his son George V becomes King of the United Kingdom and the British Dominions, and Emperor of India. The Coronation of George V and Mary takes place on 22 June 1911.
- Dissolution of the German colonial empire, Ottoman Empire, Austria-Hungary and the Russian Empire, reorganization of European states, territorial boundaries, and the creation of several new European states and territorial entities: Austria, Czechoslovakia, Estonia, Finland, Free City of Danzig, Hungary, Latvia, Lithuania, Poland, Saar, Ukraine, and Yugoslavia.
- Fourteen Points as designed by United States President Woodrow Wilson advocates the right of all nations to self-determination.
- Rise to power of the Bolsheviks in Russia under Vladimir Lenin, creating the Russian Soviet Federated Socialist Republic, the first state committed to the establishment of communism.
- The Balfour Declaration was a declaration by the British Government that announced the British desire to establish a Jewish homeland in Palestine. This declaration has often been characterized as a betrayal of the Arabs and the agreement between the British and Sharif Hussein of Mecca in the McMahon-Hussein Correspondence which promised freedom to all Arab lands from the Ottoman Empire.
- Zionism becomes more popular after the Balfour Declaration.

=== Decolonization and independence ===
- The Easter Rising against the British in Ireland eventually leads to Irish independence.
- Several nations in Eastern Europe get their nation-state, thereby replacing major multiethnic empires.
- The Republic of China was established on January 1, 1912.

=== Assassinations ===
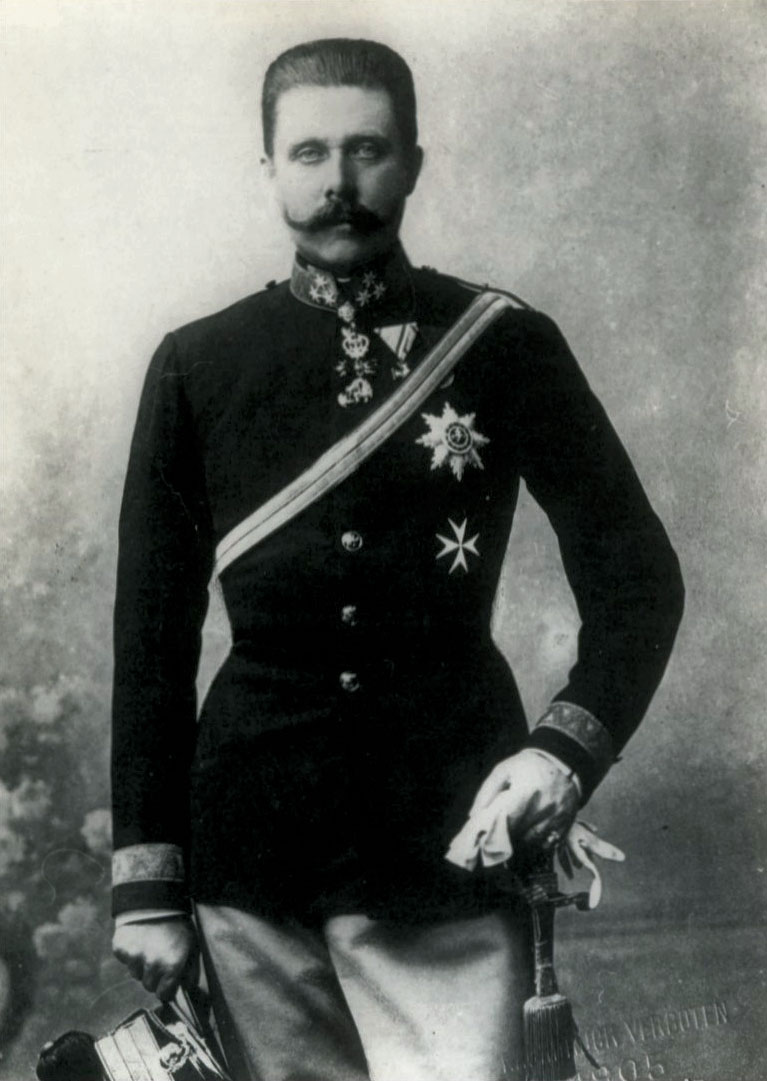
Archduke Franz Ferdinand

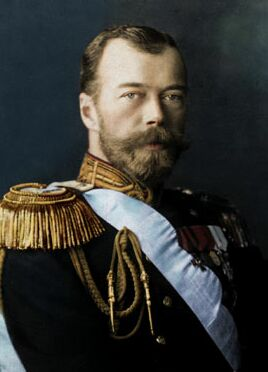
Nicholas II of Russia

Prominent assassinations include:

- March 18, 1913: George I of Greece
- June 11, 1913: Mahmud Şevket Pasha, Grand Vizier of the Ottoman Empire
- June 28, 1914: Archduke Franz Ferdinand of Austria-Hungary is assassinated in Sarajevo, Bosnia and Herzegovina; prompting the events that led up to the start of World War I.
- July 17, 1918: Murder of the Romanov family, including former Russian Emperor Nicholas II, his consort Alix of Hesse, their five children, and four retainers at the Ipatiev House in Yekaterinburg following the October Revolution of 1917, and the usurpation of power by the Bolsheviks.
- April 10, 1919: Emiliano Zapata in Mexico.

== Disasters ==
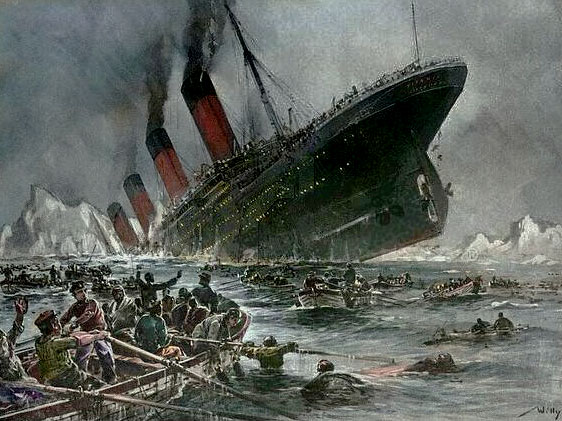
Sinking of the Titanic.

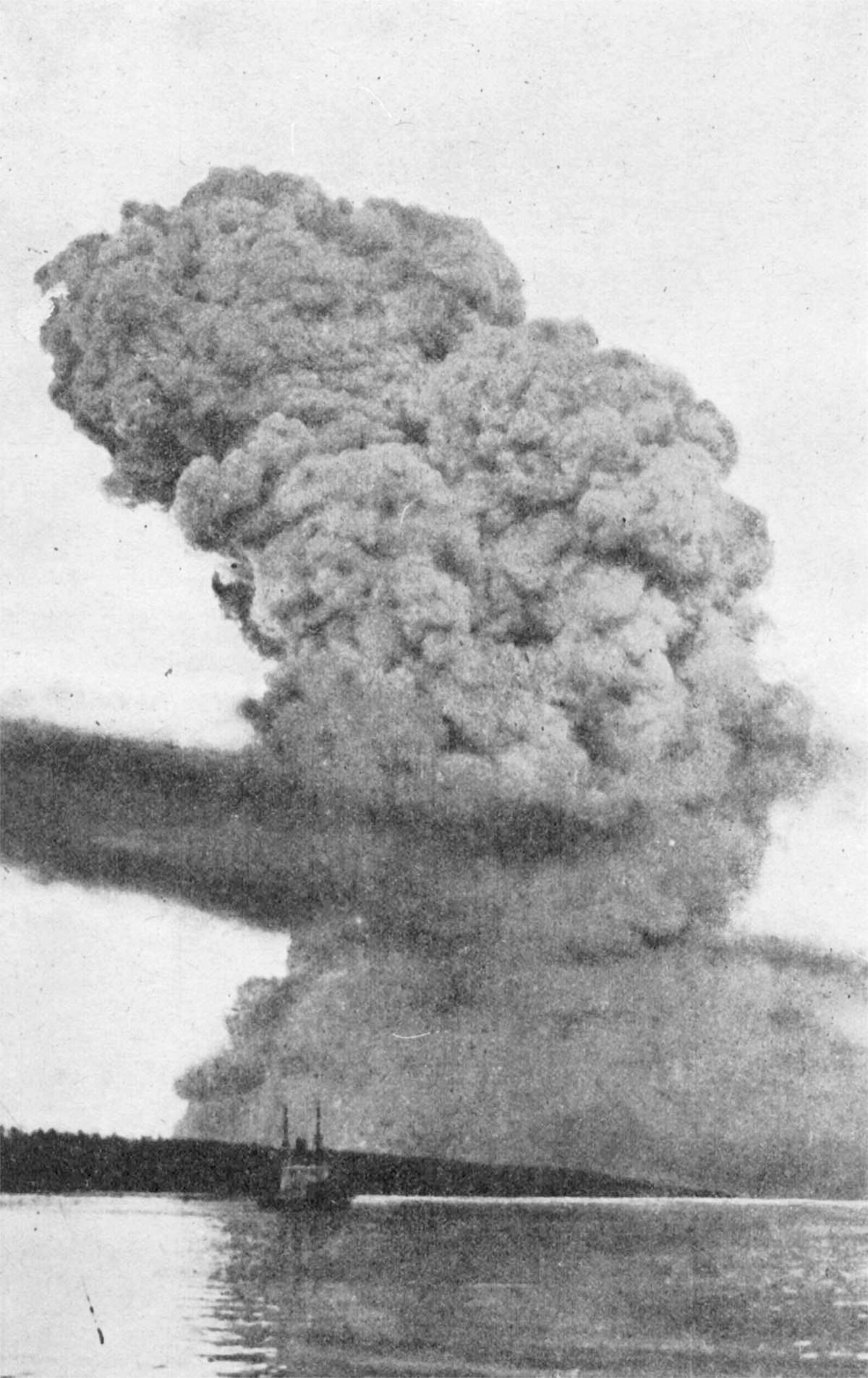
Halifax Explosion

- In 1910–1911, the Manchurian plague was a pneumonic plague that killed 60,000 people.
- The RMS Titanic, a British ocean liner which was the largest and most luxurious ship at that time, struck an iceberg and sank two hours and 40 minutes later in the North Atlantic during its maiden voyage on April 15, 1912. 1,517 people perished in the disaster.
- On March 21, 1913, The Great Dayton Flood killed 360 people and causing 100 millions dollars in damages.
- On January 11, 1914, Sakurajima erupted which resulted in the death of 35 people. In addition, the surrounding islands were consumed, and an isthmus was created between Sakurajima and the mainland.
- On May 29, 1914, the British ocean liner RMS Empress of Ireland collided in thick fog with the SS Storstad, a Norwegian collier, near the mouth of Saint Lawrence River in Canada, sinking in 14 minutes. 1,012 people died.
- On May 7, 1915, the British ocean liner RMS Lusitania was torpedoed by U-20, a German U-boat, off the Old Head of Kinsale in Ireland, sinking in 18 minutes. 1,199 people died.
- In 1916, the Netherlands was hit by a North Sea storm that flooded the lowlands and killed 19 people.
- From July 1 to July 12, 1916, a series of shark attacks, known as the Jersey Shore shark attacks of 1916, occurred along the Jersey Shore, killing four and injuring one.
- On November 21, 1916, HMHS Britannic was holed in an explosion while passing through a channel that had been seeded with enemy mines and sank in 55 minutes.
- In 1917, the Halifax Explosion killed 2,000 people.
- From 1918 through 1920, the Spanish flu killed from 17.4 to 100 million people worldwide.
- In 1919, the Great Molasses Flood in Boston, Massachusetts killed 21 people and injured 150.

== Other significant international events ==
- The Panama Canal is completed in 1914.
- World War I from 1914 until 1918 dominates the Western world.
- Hiram Bingham rediscovers Machu Picchu on July 24, 1911.

== Science and technology ==
=== Technology ===
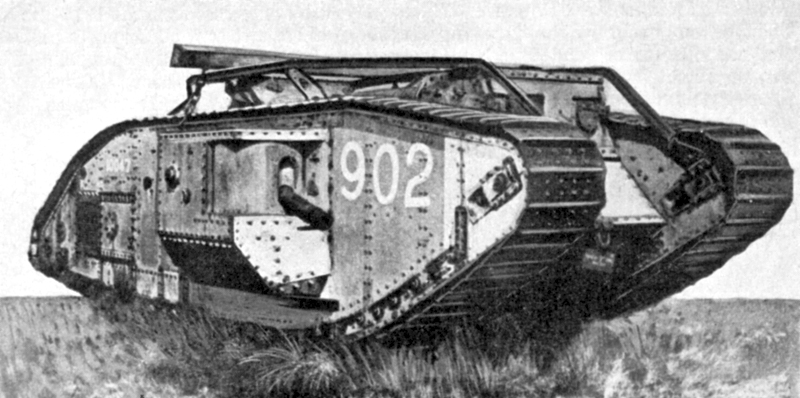
British World War I Mark V tank

- In 1912, articulated trams, were invented and first used by the Boston Elevated Railway.
- In 1913, the Haber process was first utilized on an industrial scale.
- The Model T Ford dominated the automobile market, selling more than all other makers combined in 1914.
- In 1916, Jan Czochralski invented the Czochralski process.
- In 1917, Alexander M. Nicolson invented the crystal oscillator using a piece of Rochelle salt.
- In 1919, Alice Parker invented the first system of natural gas-powered central heating for homes
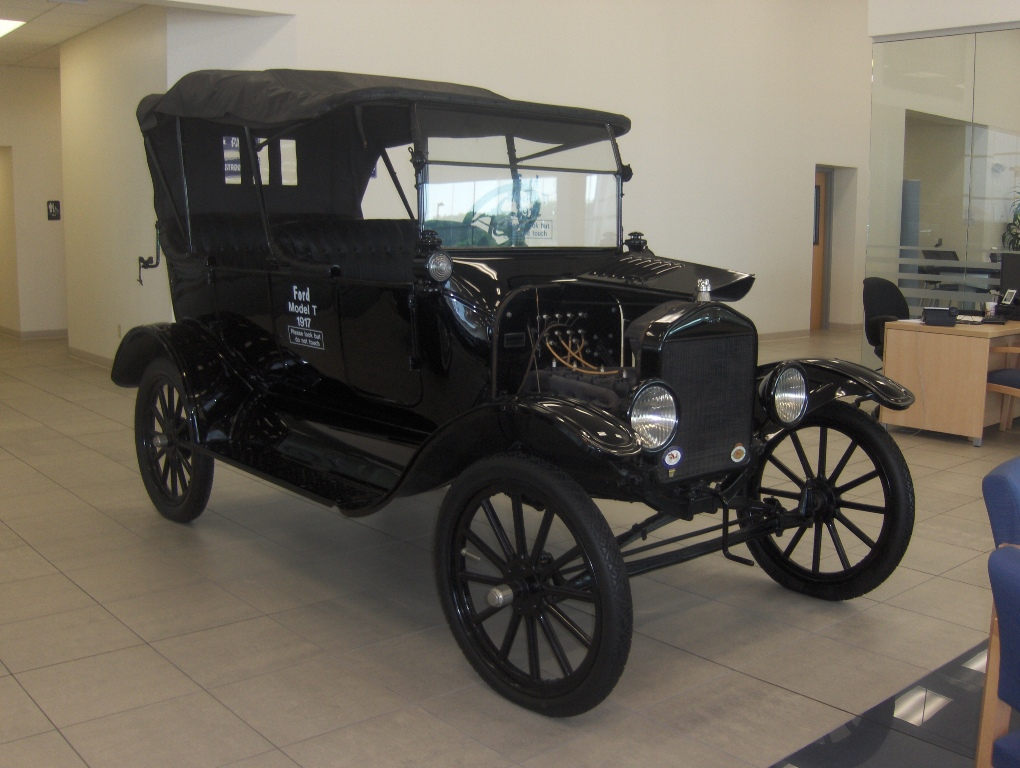
  Ford Model T. A typical 1910s car.
- Gideon Sundback patented the first modern zipper.
- Harry Brearley invented stainless steel.
- Charles Strite invented the first pop-up bread toaster.
- The army tank was invented. Tanks in World War I were used by the British Army, the French Army and the German Army.

=== Science ===
- In 1911, the cloud chamber was invented by Charles Thomson Rees Wilson.
- Victor Hess’s daring balloon experiments in 1912 led to the discovery of cosmic rays.
- In 1912, Alfred Wegener puts forward his theory of continental drift.
- In 1913, Niels Bohr introduced the Bohr model his revolutionary model of the atom.
- In 1916, Albert Einstein's theory of general relativity.
- Noether's first theorem was proven by mathematician Emmy Noether in 1915 and was published in 1918
- Max von Laue discovers the diffraction of x-rays by crystals.

== Economics ==
- In the years 1910 and 1911, there was a minor economic depression known as the Panic of 1910–1911, which was followed by the enforcement of the Sherman Anti-Trust Act.
- The outbreak of World War I caused the Financial Crisis of 1914, leading to the closure of the New York Stock Exchange for four months. U.S. Treasury Secretary William McAdoo implemented measures to stabilize the economy, marking the United States' transition from a debtor to a creditor nation.
- Following the Bolshevik Revolution in 1917, Russia experienced severe hyperinflation due to economic disarray and war. By 1924, three currency redenominations occurred, culminating in the introduction of the "gold ruble," stabilizing the economy.
- The United States emerged as a global economic power during World War I, benefiting from industrial expansion and increased consumerism. Wartime loans to Allied nations further strengthened its financial position.
- The British government implemented extensive controls during World War I under the Defense of the Realm Act, nationalizing key industries and introducing food rationing. Postwar economic challenges included high debt and unemployment.
- Germany's wartime mobilization strained its economy, leading to shortages and inflation. The Treaty of Versailles in 1919 imposed reparations that further destabilized its postwar economy.
- Italy faced significant economic challenges during World War I, including a 40% devaluation of its currency relative to the British pound. Allied intervention stabilized its currency in 1918.
- Japan experienced rapid industrialization during World War I, driven by increased demand for exports such as textiles and machinery. This period saw significant growth in heavy industries like steel and shipbuilding, concentrated in urban centers along the Tōkaidō industrial belt.

== Popular culture ==
- Flying Squadron of America promotes temperance movement in the United States.
- Edith Smith Davis edits the Temperance Educational Quarterly.
- The first U.S. feature film, Oliver Twist, was released in 1912.
- The first mob film, D. W. Griffith's The Musketeers of Pig Alley, was released in 1912.
- Hollywood, California, replaces the East Coast as the center of the movie industry.
- The first crossword puzzle was published 21 December 1913 appearing in The New York World newspaper.
- The comic strip Krazy Kat begins.
- Charlie Chaplin débuts his trademark mustached, baggy-pants "Little Tramp" character in Kid Auto Races at Venice in 1914.
- The first African American owned studio, the Lincoln Motion Picture Company, was founded in 1917.
- The four Warner brothers, (from older to younger) Harry, Albert, Samuel, and Jack opened their first major film studio in Burbank in 1918.
- Tarzan of the Apes starring Elmo Lincoln is released in 1918, the first Tarzan film.
- The first jazz music is recorded by the Original Dixieland Jass Band for Victor (#18255) in late February 1917.
- The Salvation Army has a new international leader, General Bramwell Booth who served from 1912 to 1929. He replaces his father and co-founder of the Christian Mission (the forerunner of the Salvation Army), William Booth.

=== Sports ===
- 1912 Summer Olympics were held in Stockholm, Sweden.
- 1916 Summer Olympics were cancelled because of World War I.

=== Literature and arts ===
Below are the best-selling books in the United States of each year, as determined by The Bookman, a New York-based literary journal (1910–1912) and Publishers Weekly (1913 and beyond).

- 1910: The Rosary by Florence L. Barclay
- 1911: The Broad Highway by Jeffery Farnol
- 1912: The Harvester by Gene Stratton Porter
- 1913: The Inside of the Cup by Winston Churchill
- 1914: The Eyes of the World by Harold Bell Wright
- 1915: The Turmoil by Booth Tarkington
- 1916: Seventeen by Booth Tarkington
- 1917: Mr. Britling Sees It Through by H. G. Wells
- 1918: The U.P. Trail by Zane Grey
- 1919: The Four Horseman of the Apocalypse by Vicente Blasco Ibáñez

=== Visual Arts ===
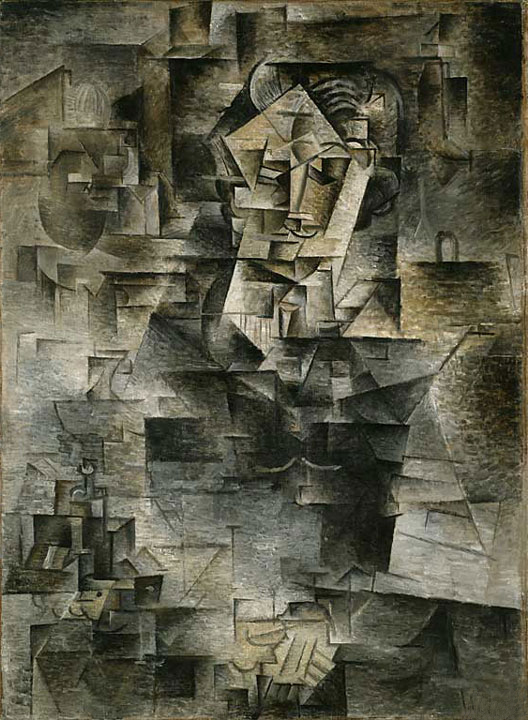
Pablo Picasso, Portrait of Daniel-Henry Kahnweiler, 1910, The Art Institute of Chicago. Pablo Picasso and Georges Braque co-invent Cubism, revolutionizing the art of painting and advancing the concepts of Modern art and Modernism.

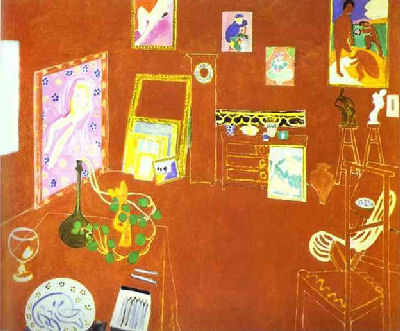
Henri Matisse, L'Atelier Rouge, 1911, oil on canvas, 162 × 130 cm., The Museum of Modern Art, New York City

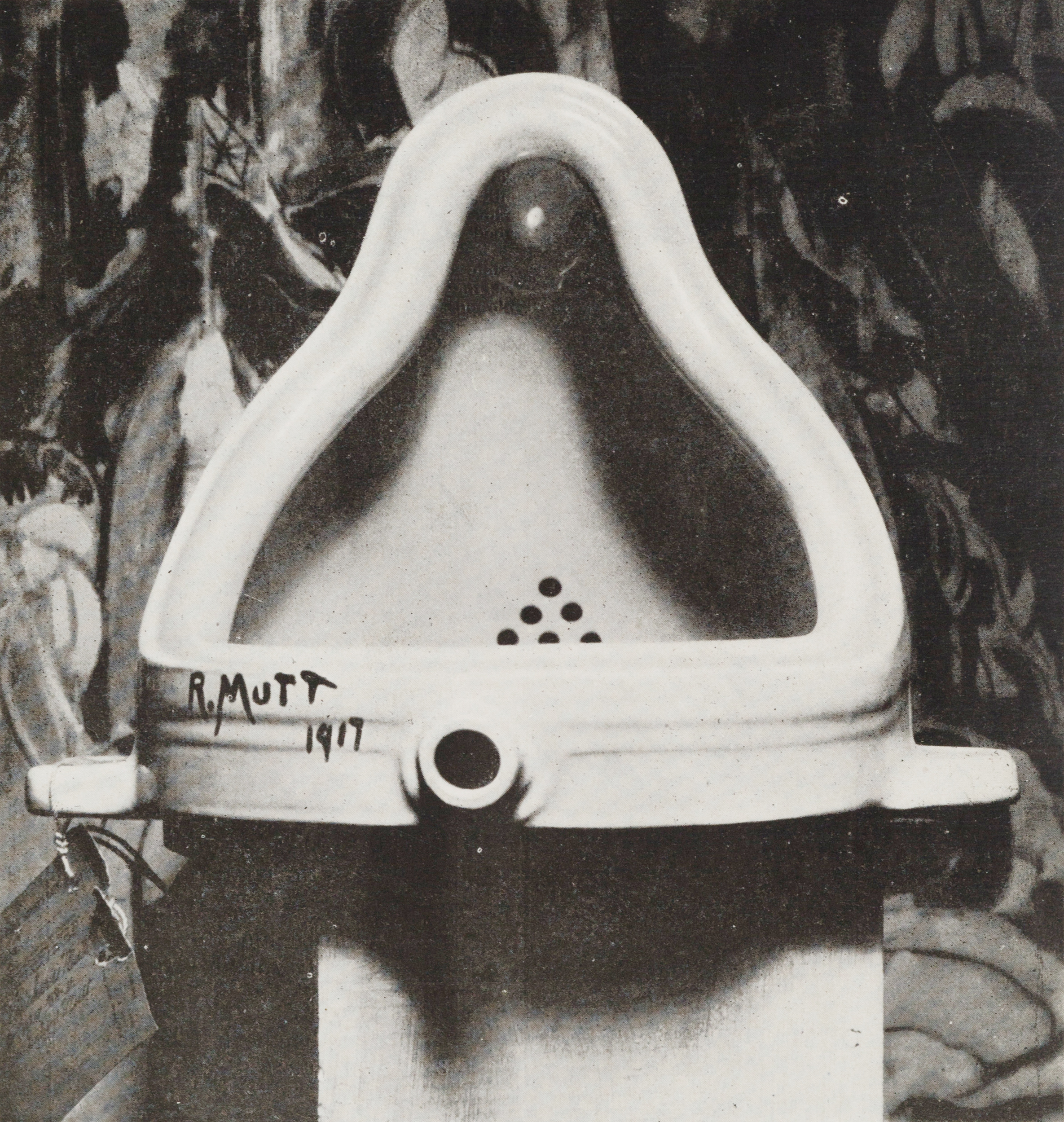
Marcel Duchamp, Fountain, 1917, Duchamp introduces his Readymades, as an example of Dada and Anti-art. Photograph by Alfred Stieglitz

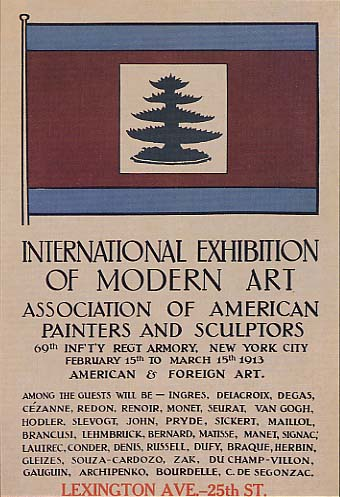
Armory Show poster, 1913, Internationally groundbreaking exhibition of Modern art

The 1913 Armory Show in New York City was a seminal event in the history of Modern Art. Innovative contemporaneous artists from Europe and the United States exhibited together in a massive group exhibition in New York City, and Chicago.

==== Art movements ====
- Imagism

===== Cubism and related movements =====
- Proto-Cubism
- Crystal Cubism
- Orphism
- Section d'Or
- Synchromism
- Futurism

===== Expressionism and related movements =====
- Symbolism
- Blaue Reiter
- Die Brücke

===== Geometric abstraction and related movements =====
- Suprematism
- De Stijl
- Constructivism

===== Other movements and techniques =====
- Surrealism
- Dada
- Collage

=== Influential artists ===
- Pablo Picasso
- Georges Braque
- Henri Matisse
- Jean Metzinger
- Marcel Duchamp
- Wassily Kandinsky
- Albert Gleizes
- Kasimir Malevich
- Giorgio de Chirico
- Robert Frost

== People ==
=== Business ===
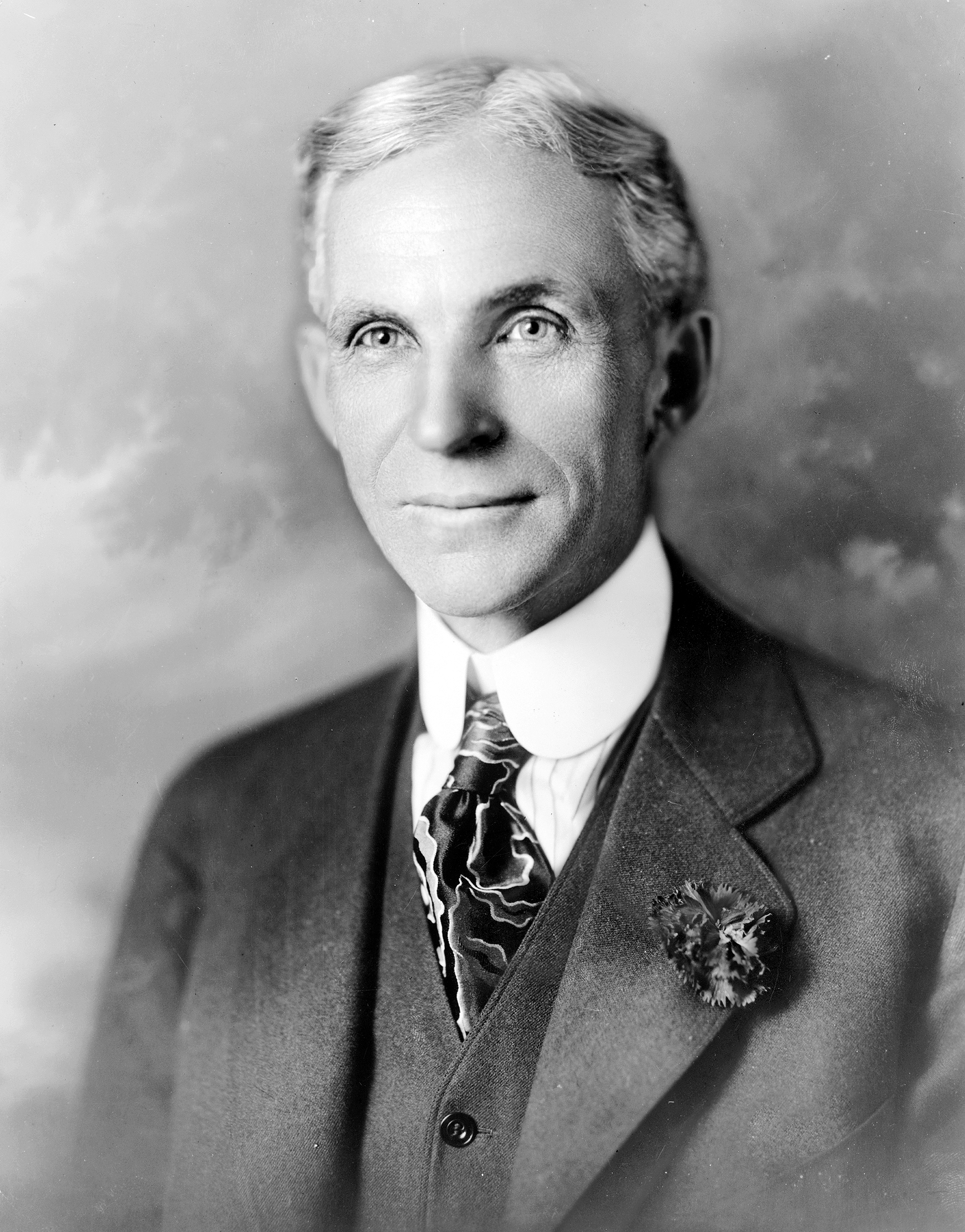
Henry Ford

- Arnold Rothstein, gangster, gambler, fixed the 1919 World Series
- Henry Ford, founder of the Ford Motor Company

=== Scientists, Engineers and Inventors ===
- G.H. Hardy, British Mathematician
- Srinivasa Ramanujan, Indian Mathematician
- Emmy Noether, German Mathematician
- Albert Einstein, German - Jewish Physicist
- Niels Bohr, Danish Physicist
- Ernest Rutherford, British Physicist
- Nikola Tesla, Serbian electrical and mechanical engineer
- Frederick William Wolf Jr., American engineer and inventor of Electric Refregerator.
- Gabriel Voisin, Robert Esnault-Pelterie Louis Béchereau and Theodore von Kármán, European aviation pioneers.
- Lawrence Pomeroy, Marc Birkigt and Giuseppe Merosi, European automotive pioneers.

=== Politics ===
- John Barrett, Director-general Organization of American States
- George Louis Beer, Chairman Permanent Mandates Commission
- Henry P. Davison, Chairman International Federation of Red Cross and Red Crescent Societies
- Sir James Eric Drummond, Secretary-general League of Nations
- Emil Frey, Director International Telecommunication Union
- Christian Louis Lange, Secretary-general Inter-Parliamentary Union
- Baron Louis Paul Marie Hubert Michiels van Verduynen, Secretary-general Permanent Court of Arbitration
- William E. Rappard, Secretary-general International Federation of Red Cross and Red Crescent Societies
- Manfred von Richthofen, alias the "Red Baron", fighter pilot
- Eugène Ruffy, Director Universal Postal Union
- William Napier Shaw, President World Meteorological Organization
- Albert Thomas, Director International Labour Organization
- Grigory Yevseyevich Zinoviev, Chairman of the Executive Committee of the Communist International

=== Authors ===
- Edgar Rice Burroughs
- James Joyce

=== Entertainers ===
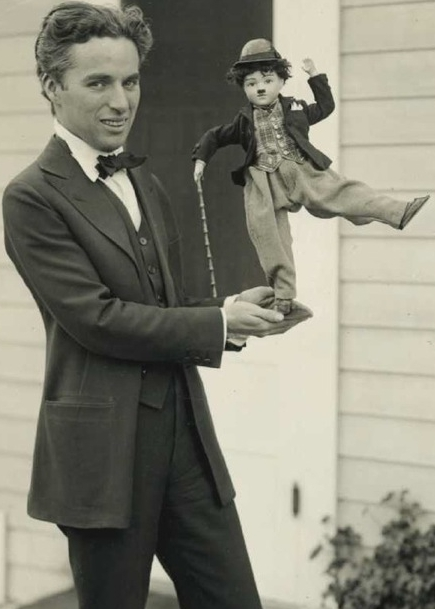
Charlie Chaplin

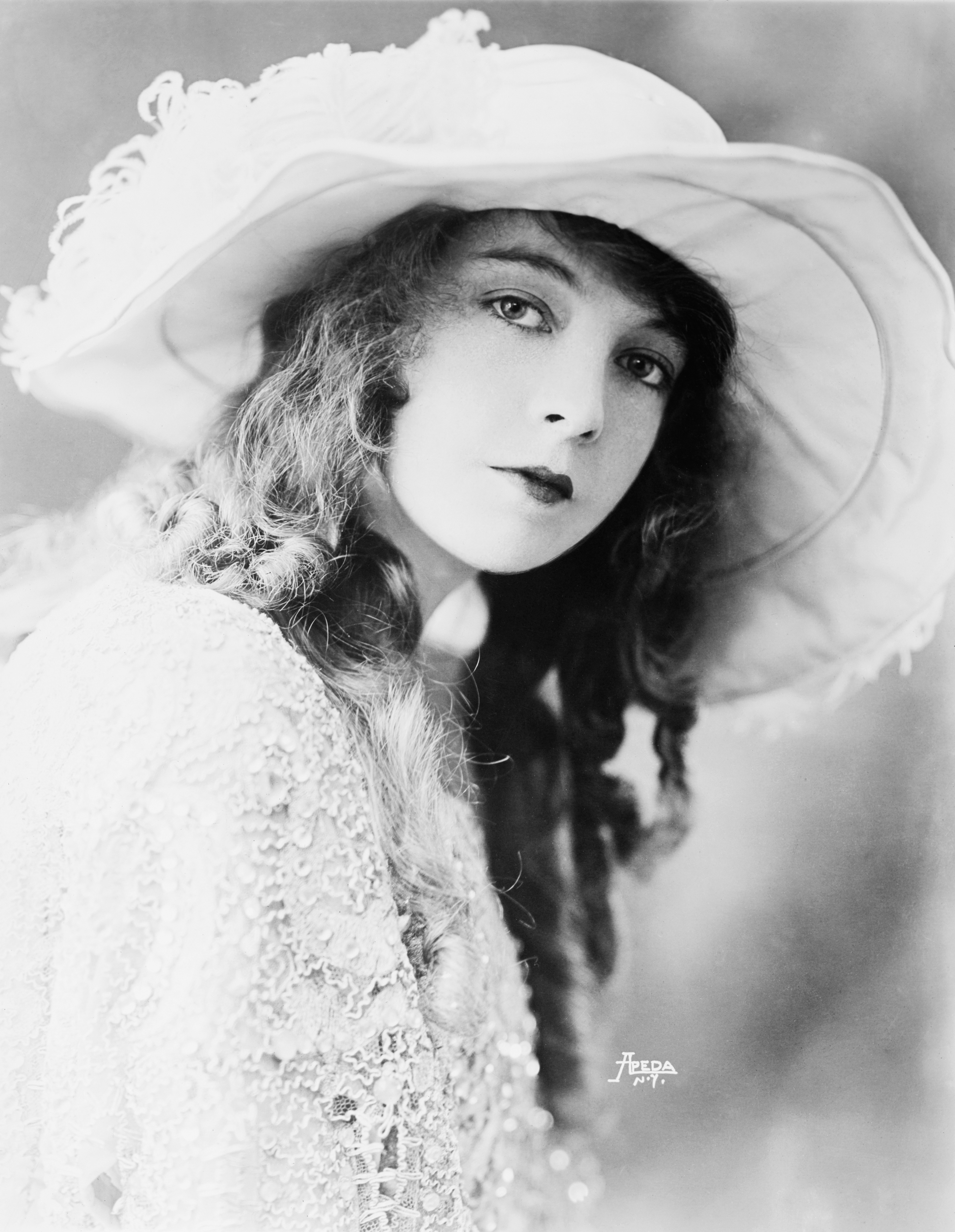
Lillian Gish

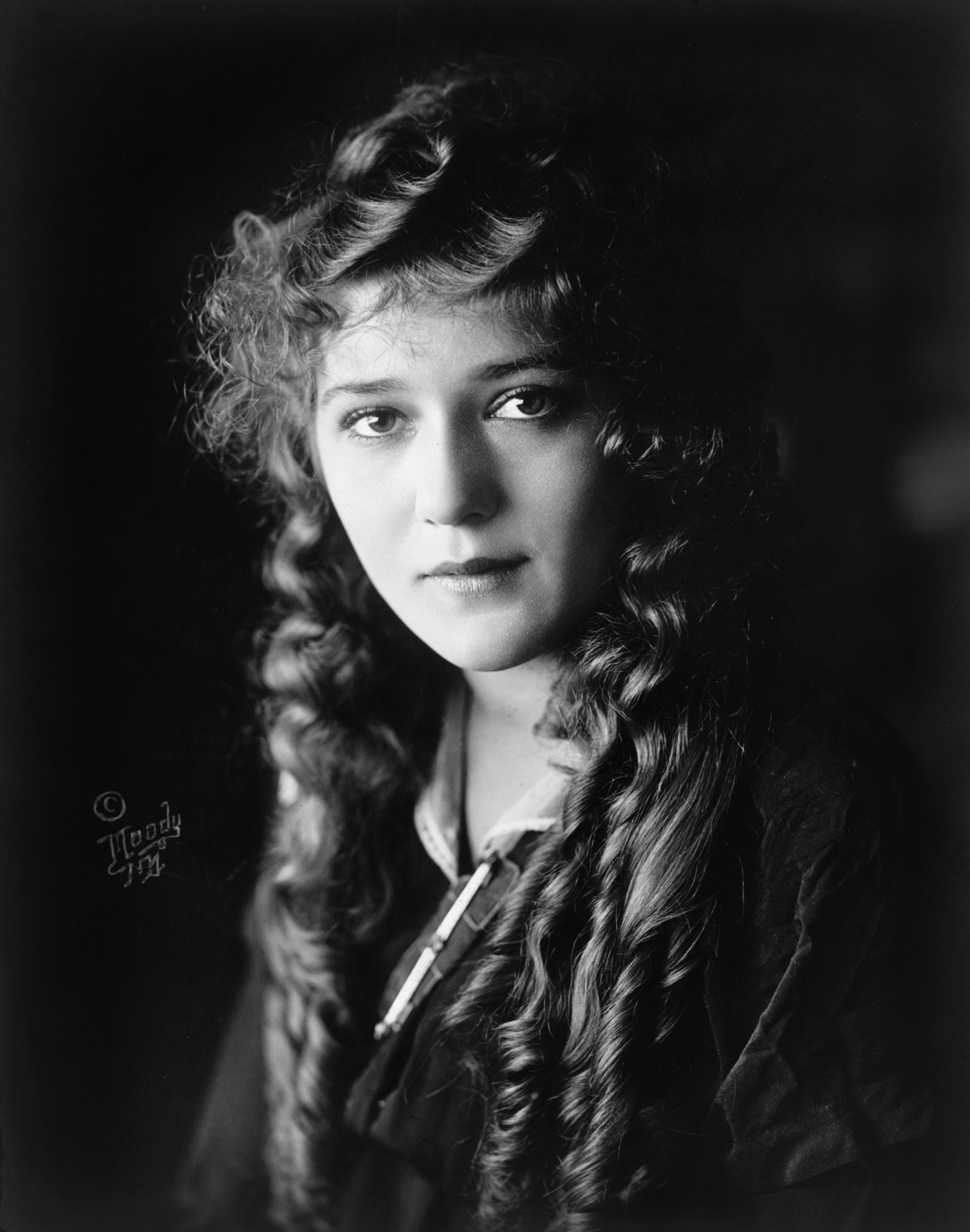
Mary Pickford

- Fatty Arbuckle
- Theda Bara
- Richard Barthelmess
- Béla Bartók
- Irving Berlin
- Eubie Blake
- Shelton Brooks
- Lew Brown
- Tom Brown
- Anne Caldwell
- Eddie Cantor
- Enrico Caruso
- Charlie Chaplin
- Lon Chaney
- George M. Cohan
- Henry Creamer
- Bebe Daniels
- Cecil B. DeMille
- Buddy De Sylva
- Walter Donaldson
- Marie Dressler
- Eddie Edwards
- Gus Edwards
- Douglas Fairbanks
- Fred Fisher
- John Ford
- Eddie Foy
- George Gershwin
- Beniamino Gigli
- Dorothy Gish
- Lillian Gish
- Samuel Goldwyn
- D. W. Griffith
- W. C. Handy
- Otto Harbach
- Lorenz Hart
- Victor Herbert
- Harry Houdini
- Charles Ives
- Tony Jackson
- Emil Jannings
- William Jerome
- Al Jolson
- Gus Kahn
- Gustave Kahn
- Buster Keaton
- Jerome David Kern
- Ring Lardner
- Nick LaRocca
- Harry Lauder
- Florence Lawrence
- Ted Lewis
- Harold Lloyd
- Charles McCarron
- Joseph McCarthy
- Winsor McCay
- Oscar Micheaux
- Mae Murray
- Alla Nazimova
- Pola Negri
- Anna Q. Nilsson
- Mabel Normand
- Ivor Novello
- Alcide Nunez
- Geoffrey O'Hara
- Sidney Olcott
- Jack Pickford
- Mary Pickford
- Armand J. Piron
- Cole Porter
- American Quartet
- Richard Rodgers
- Sigmund Romberg
- Jean Schwartz
- Mack Sennett
- Larry Shields
- Chris Smith
- Erich von Stroheim
- Arthur Sullivan
- Gloria Swanson
- Wilber Sweatman
- Blanche Sweet
- Albert Von Tilzer
- Harry Von Tilzer
- Musicians of the Titanic
- Sophie Tucker
- Pete Wendling
- Pearl White
- Bert Williams
- Clarence Williams
- Harry Williams
- Spencer Williams
- P. G. Wodehouse

=== Sports figures ===
==== Baseball ====
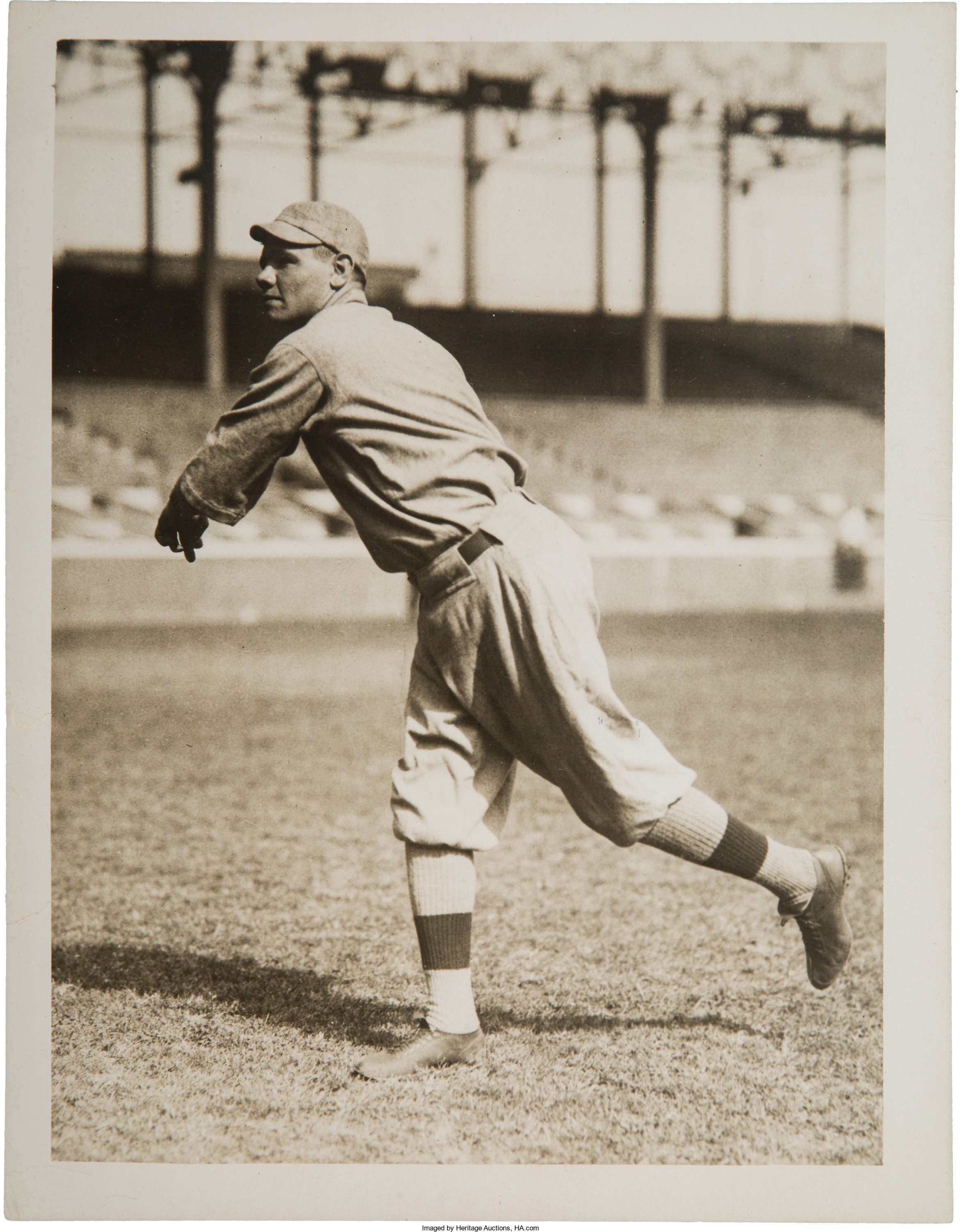
Babe Ruth, 1915

- Babe Ruth, (American baseball player)
- Honus Wagner, (American baseball player)
- Christy Mathewson, (American baseball player)
- Walter Johnson, (American baseball player)
- Ty Cobb, (American baseball player)
- Tris Speaker, (American baseball player)
- Nap Lajoie, (American baseball player)
- Eddie Collins, (American baseball player)
- Mordecai Brown, (American baseball player)

==== Olympics ====
- Jim Thorpe

==== Boxing ====
- Jack Dempsey
- Jess Willard

== See also ==
- List of decades, centuries, and millennia
- Edwardian era (commonly extended into the decade's early years)
- Progressive Era (up until late into the decade)
- List of years in literature § 1910s
- Lost Generation (the decade when the majority of the WWI vets came of age)
- Interbellum Generation (when the oldest members of that demographic had matured in the decade's final year)

=== Timeline ===
The following articles contain brief timelines which list the most prominent events of the decade:

1910 • 1911 • 1912 • 1913 • 1914 • 1915 • 1916 • 1917 • 1918 • 1919
