= The Dwelling-Place of Light =

Book by Winston Churchill

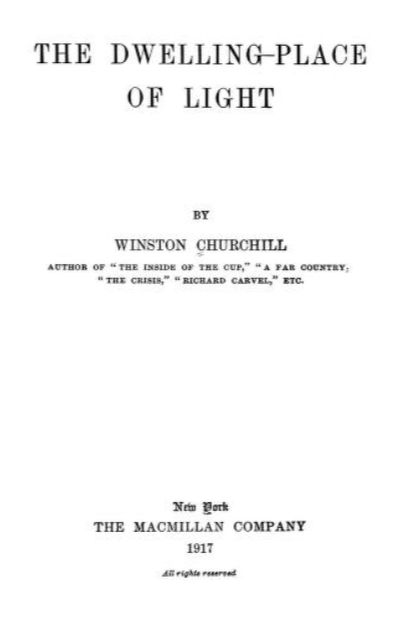
- Title page for The Dwelling-Place of Light (1917)
- Author: Winston Churchill
- Language: English
- Genre: Novel
- Publisher: Macmillan
- Publication date: October 1917
- Publication place: United States
- Media type: Print (Hardcover)
- Pages: 462

The Dwelling-Place of Light is a 1917 best-selling novel by American writer Winston Churchill, the last of his twenty-year run of best-sellers.

Like The Inside of the Cup and A Far Country, the title has a biblical allusion: "Where is the way to the dwelling of light?" Published in October 1917, it did not achieve as many sales as his prior novels. The novel was ranked 14th on Publishers Weekly annual list of bestselling fiction books for 1917, though the novel only came out in October of that year. It was ranked fifth on the Bookman's list for 1917.

It was also adapted into a silent film in 1920, directed by Jack Conway and starring Claire Adams, Nigel De Brulier, and King Baggot.
