= A Far Country =

A Far Country may refer to:

- A Far Country (play), a 1961 play by Henry Denker
- A Far Country (novel), a 1915 novel by American writer Winston Churchill

== See also ==
- The Far Country (disambiguation)
