= The Celebrity =

Novel by Winston Churchill

The Celebrity (An Episode) (1897) is the first novel that was published by American author Winston Churchill. It was a minor bestseller of 1898.

== Plot ==
John Crocker has been the friend of the Celebrity, long before he became famous. During a summer retreat at Asquith resort, he runs into the Celebrity, who has taken the identity of another man for anonymity. The Celebrity meets Irene Trevor, the daughter of an Ohio state senator, and asks her to marry him, and she accepts. When a female he perceives as more desirable, Marian Thorn, arrives at Asquith, the Celebrity leaves Miss Trevor without breaking off the engagement. That behavior goes against the moral fiber of the Celebrity's stories. Both women know his true identity as a famous writer and are familiar with his published works.

Mr. Farquhar Fenelon Cooke and his wife are wealthy and have a summer retreat of their own named Mohair. The Celebrity leaves Asquith for Mohair to be with Marian Thorn, who is the niece of the Cookes. The slighted Irene Trevor confides in John Crocker that the Celebrity never broke up with her, an action that could be used against him later.

Mr. Cooke throws a party and invites the people from Asquith to join them. John Crocker and Miss Trevor reluctantly go. It appears to John Crocker that Miss Thorn and the Celebrity are romantically involved and he is jealous. Mr. Cooke buys a new yacht, the Maria (named after his wife), and he invites all his guests for a trip to Bear Island.

At Bear Island, a newspaper brought on board the yacht reveals that Charles Wrexell Allan has embezzled $100,000 from the Miles Standish Bicycle Company. Coincidentally, Allan is the man that the Celebrity is impersonating. When the Celebrity asks John Crocker and Miss Trevor to reveal his true identity, they decide to be mischievous and pretend not to know him by any name but Allan.

Another yacht enters Bear Island harbor and a man in an obvious disguise, Mr. Dunn, visits the island. The party believes Mr. Dunn is a detective. Mr. Trevor demands that the Celebrity be turned over to authorities. The Celebrity is hidden in a cave for the night. The next day, Mr. Dunn is gone; Mr. Cooke insists on taking the Celebrity to Canada.

A police tug boat catches up to the Maria, and the Celebrity is hidden in the ballast area. Captain McMain, Chief of the Far Harbor Police, searches the boat but does not find the Celebrity. Mr. Cooke finds a cove to stop in for the night. In the morning, while rowing passengers back to the Maria, the police return. John Crocker, the Celebrity, Miss Thorn, and Miss Trevor are left behind on shore.

The Celebrity asks Miss Thorn to marry him. Miss Thorn then tells Miss Trevor about the proposal, and Miss Trevor reveals that she herself is still engaged to the Celebrity. Now, John Crocker realizes that the girls were in on a plot to humiliate the Celebrity for going against his own doctrine from his stories.

After being humiliated the Celebrity leaves the three to escape into Canada. The police come back and pick up John, Miss Thorn, and Miss Trevor in the police tug that is towing the Maria. During the trip back, Captain McCann says he is still looking for the embezzler, Mr. Allen.

Miss Thorn then reveals to John Crocker that she has secretly admired him ever since they met. They realize they are going to become romantically involved in the future. When they reach shore, it is revealed that Mr. Dunn, the suspected detective, has turned out to have been Mr. Allen.

The story is wrapped up with the marriage of John Crocker and Irene Thorn. They go to Europe and at a party, a book written by the Celebrity is brought up to be signed by the author. On inspection, Crocker realizes the signature is a fraud. He realizes Mr. Allen has been posing as the Celebrity and traveling through Europe on a book signing tour.

Later, during their stay in Paris, the Crockers meet the Celebrity. He has a new girl, has no hard feelings about his summer stay at Asquith and Mohair, has traveled around the World and met Charles Wexell Allen in his travels. He reveals that Mr. Allen thanked him for inadvertently helping him in the embezzlement.

== Other ==
Churchill's first published novel, he started writing the book in the latter half of 1895. His plan to finish the book before an April 1896 trip to Europe did not work out, but Macmillan approved the unfinished manuscript while he was traveling, and asked him to finish it. One attempt to complete it met with some suggestions for revision from the publisher, and the rewritten version finished in France apparently got lost in the mail to New York. Churchill meanwhile began working on his next novel, Richard Carvel, and did not turn back to completing The Celebrity manuscript, which he substantially rewrote, for the final time in mid-1897.

The Celebrity was published in November 1897, and gained in popularity through 1898. Speculation that the "celebrity" of the book was based on popular journalist Richard Harding Davis helped propel the success of the book, but Churchill denied any such intent. The reviewers were not especially enamored of the merits of the book, but already the future promise of his next book was being speculated about.

The book was dedicated to Albert Shaw, Ph.D.
