= Mr. Crewe's Career =

Novel by Winston Churchill

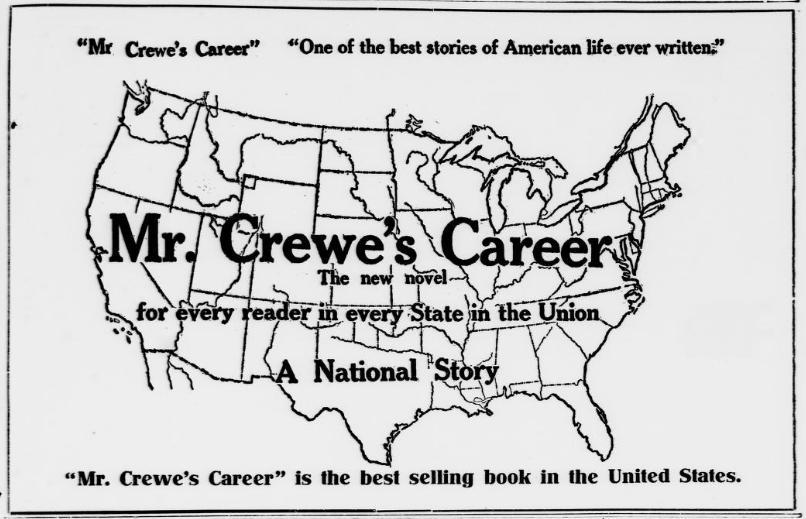
- Advertisement for Mr. Crewe's Career in the New York Tribune
- Author: Winston Churchill
- Language: English
- Genre: Novel
- Publisher: Macmillan
- Publication date: May 1908
- Publication place: United States
- Media type: Print (hardcover)
- Pages: 498 pp

Mr. Crewe's Career is a 1908 best-selling novel by American writer Winston Churchill.

The novel tells the story of a railroad lobby's attempts to control the New Hampshire state government using all possible tactics. Churchill's prior novel Coniston was also a political novel, and the successor draws from Churchill's own unsuccessful run for Governor of New Hampshire in 1906.

Though the book was perhaps not as praised as Coniston, it was generally well-received and popular. It was the best-selling novel in the United States in 1908. Playwright Marion Fairfax also adapted the novel into a play which opened in New Haven, Connecticut in December 1908.
