= Mr. Keegan's Elopement =

Novel by Winston Churchill

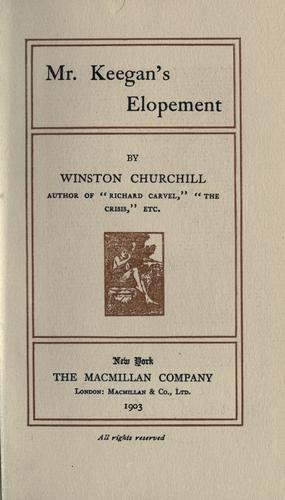
- Author: Winston Churchill
- Language: English
- Genre: Short story/Novella
- Publisher: Macmillan
- Publication date: June 1896 (The Century Magazine); Republished in book format June 1903
- Publication place: United States
- Pages: 73 pp (1903 book)

Mr. Keegan's Elopement is a short story published by American writer Winston Churchill in June 1896 in The Century Magazine. His first published story, it was republished in book format by Churchill's publisher Macmillan in June 1903 following the success of his first three novels, especially 1899's Richard Carvel.
