= A Modern Chronicle =

Novel by Winston Churchill

- Author: Winston Churchill
- Illustrator: J. H. Gardner Soper
- Language: English
- Publisher: Macmillan
- Publication date: March 1910
- Publication place: United States
- Media type: Print (hardcover)
- Pages: 524

A Modern Chronicle is a 1910 best-selling novel by American writer Winston Churchill.

The novel explores "the problem of the modern woman" and the effects of divorce, in a world driven by industrialization and business competition. Honora Leffingwell divorces her successful stockbroker husband to climb the social ladder, remarrying a man with ancestral wealth and status who turns out not to be all he seems.

== Reception ==
Churchill completed the manuscript of the novel in December 1909. Released in March 1910, it was the second best-selling novel in the United States in 1910, and was the best-selling book in the country in the June and July 1910 issues of The Bookman.

There were positive reviews in mainstream papers. Upton Sinclair's review of the novel for The New Age said a "peculiar intellectual and spiritual immaturity" was becoming more apparent as Churchill's novels had progressed from historical romances to modern themes. Sinclair said that he had read all of Churchill's works "not only because I like to pass a day of rest now and then, but because Mr. Churchill is our most prominent popular novelist and sells several hundred thousand copies of each of his books, and is therefore an important sign of the times" and that the novel shows "just exactly how far the mind of the American people has progressed on the subject" of divorce.
