= Malcolm Fraser (artist) =

American and Canadian artist (1869–1949)

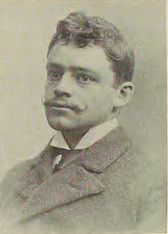
- Born: 19 April 1869, 19 April 1868; Montreal
- Died: 12 June 1949 (aged 80); Brookhaven
- Occupation: Painter

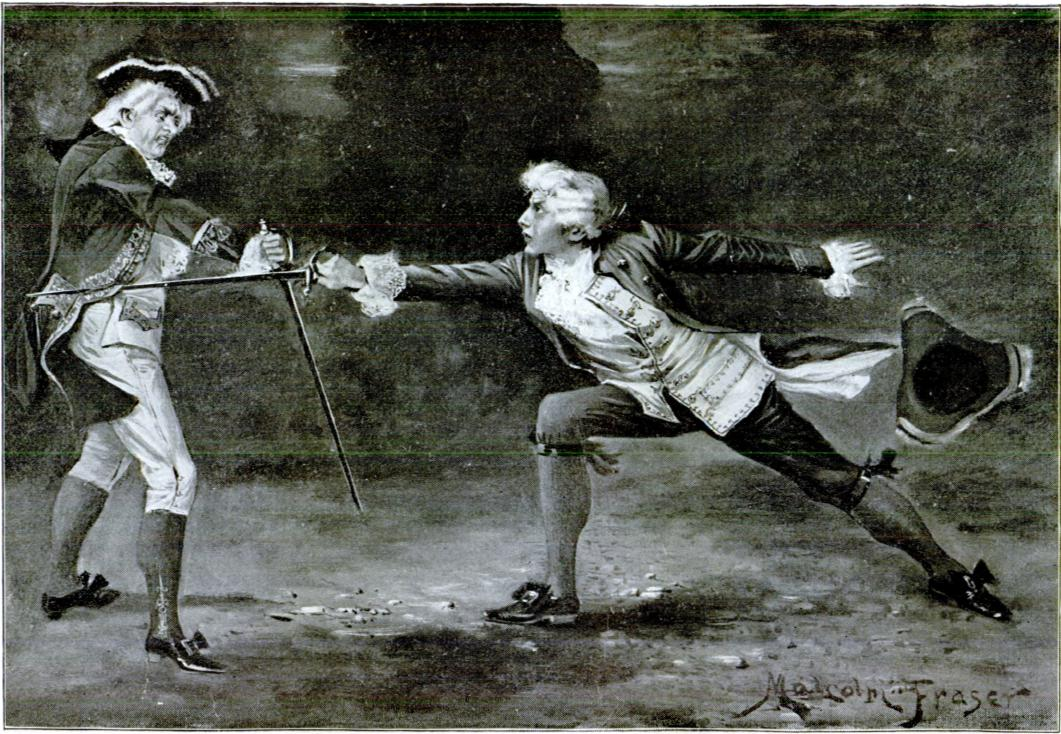
Fraser illustration appearing in bestselling 1899 novel Richard Carvel

Charles Malcolm Fraser (known as Malcolm Fraser) (April 19, 1869 – June 12, 1949) was an artist and illustrator in American magazines and various novels.
