= A Traveller in War-Time =

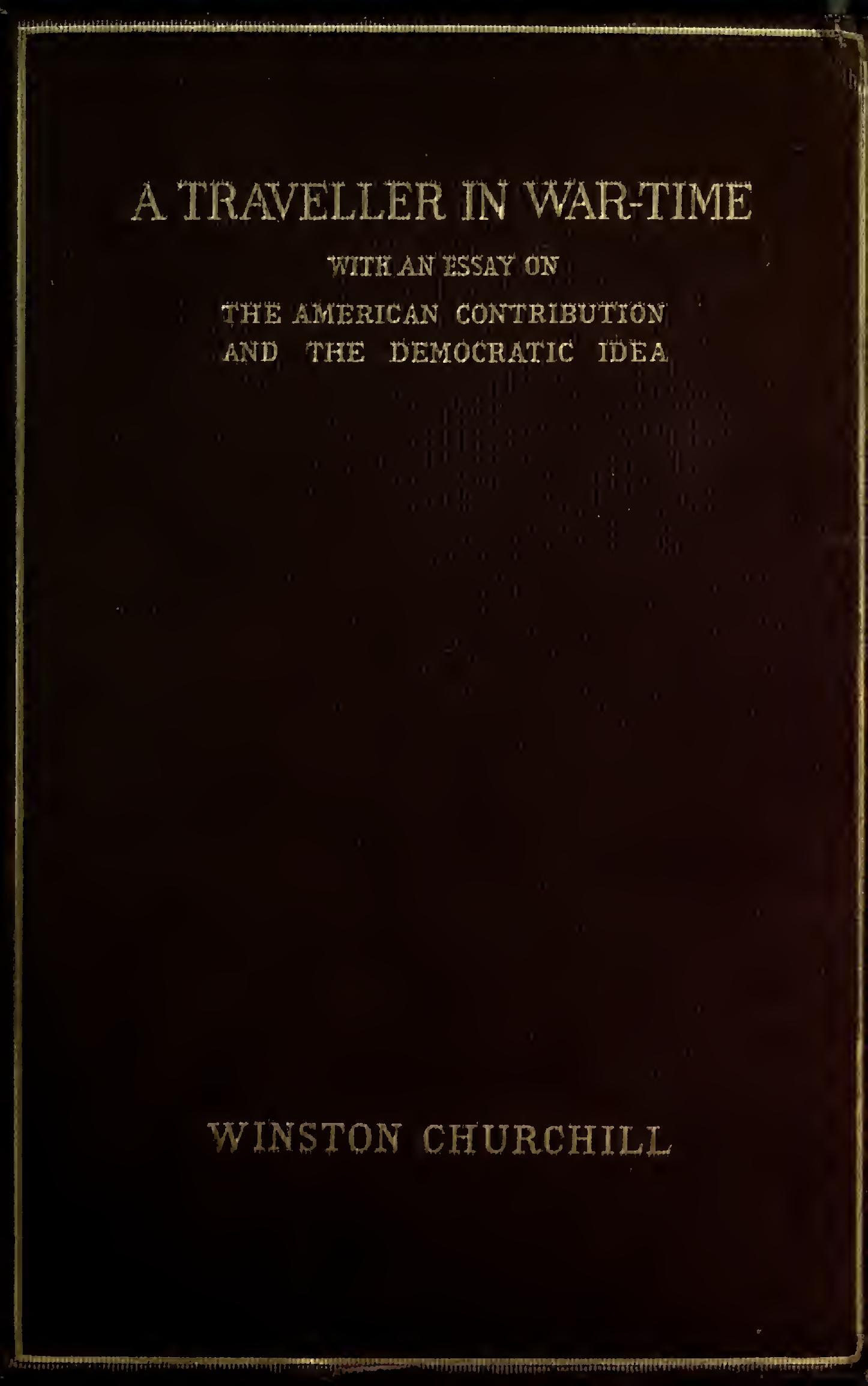
- 1918 cover
- Author: Winston Churchill
- Language: English
- Publisher: Macmillan
- Publication date: July 1918
- Publication place: United States
- Media type: Print (Hardcover)
- Pages: 172

A Traveller in War-Time is a non-fiction book by American author Winston Churchill recounting his travels in Europe during World War I. Released in July 1918 with the full title A Traveller in War-time with an Essay on the American Contribution and the Democratic Idea, the essay comprises about half of the book. It was Churchill's first non-fiction book.

Especially compared to his string of best-selling novels, the book was not successful, selling only about 8,000 copies.
