= Publishers Weekly list of bestselling novels in the United States in the 1910s =

This is a list of bestselling novels in the United States in the 1910s, as determined by The Bookman, a New York–based literary journal (1910–1912) and Publishers Weekly (1913 and beyond). The list features the most popular novels of each year from 1910 through 1919.

The standards set for inclusion in the lists – which, for example, led to the exclusion of the novels in the Harry Potter series from the lists for the 1990s and 2000s – are currently unknown.

== 1910 ==
1. The Rosary by Florence L. Barclay
2. A Modern Chronicle by Winston Churchill
3. The Wild Olive by Anonymous (Basil King)
4. Max by Katherine Cecil Thurston
5. The Kingdom of Slender Swords by Hallie Erminie Rives
6. Simon the Jester by William J. Locke
7. Lord Loveland Discovers America by C. N. Williamson and A. M. Williamson
8. The Window at the White Cat by Mary Roberts Rinehart
9. Molly Make-Believe by Eleanor Hallowell Abbott
10. When a Man Marries by Mary Roberts Rinehart

== 1911 ==
1. The Broad Highway by Jeffery Farnol
2. The Prodigal Judge by Vaughan Kester
3. The Winning of Barbara Worth by Harold Bell Wright
4. Queed by Henry Sydnor Harrison
5. The Harvester by Gene Stratton Porter
6. The Iron Woman by Margaret Deland
7. The Long Roll by Mary Johnston
8. Molly Make-Believe by Eleanor Hallowell Abbott
9. The Rosary by Florence L. Barclay
10. The Common Law by Robert W. Chambers

== 1912 ==
1. The Harvester by Gene Stratton Porter
2. The Street Called Straight by Basil King
3. Their Yesterdays by Harold Bell Wright
4. The Melting of Molly by Maria Thompson Daviess
5. A Hoosier Chronicle by Meredith Nicholson
6. The Winning of Barbara Worth by Harold Bell Wright
7. The Just and the Unjust by Vaughan Kester
8. The Net by Rex Beach
9. Tante by Anne Douglas Sedgwick
10. Fran by J. Breckenridge Ellis

== 1913 ==
1. The Inside of the Cup by Winston Churchill
2. V.V.'s Eyes by Henry Sydnor Harrison
3. Laddie by Gene Stratton Porter
4. The Judgment House by Gilbert Parker
5. Heart of the Hills by John Fox, Jr.
6. The Amateur Gentleman by Jeffery Farnol
7. The Woman Thou Gavest Me by Hall Caine
8. Pollyanna by Eleanor H. Porter
9. The Valiants of Virginia by Hallie Erminie Rives
10. T. Tembarom by Frances Hodgson Burnett

== 1914 ==
1. The Eyes of the World by Harold Bell Wright
2. Pollyanna by Eleanor H. Porter
3. The Inside of the Cup by Winston Churchill
4. The Salamander by Owen Johnson
5. The Fortunate Youth by William J. Locke
6. T. Tembarom by Frances Hodgson Burnett
7. Penrod by Booth Tarkington
8. Diane of the Green Van by Leona Dalrymple
9. The Devil's Garden by W. B. Maxwell
10. The Prince of Graustark by George Barr McCutcheon

== 1915 ==
1. The Turmoil by Booth Tarkington
2. A Far Country by Winston Churchill
3. Michael O'Halloran by Gene Stratton Porter
4. Pollyanna Grows Up by Eleanor H. Porter
5. K by Mary Roberts Rinehart
6. Jaffery by William J. Locke
7. Felix O'Day by F. Hopkinson Smith
8. The Harbor by Ernest Poole
9. The Lone Star Ranger by Zane Grey
10. Angela's Business by Henry Sydnor Harrison

== 1916 ==
1. Seventeen by Booth Tarkington
2. When a Man's a Man by Harold Bell Wright
3. Just David by Eleanor H. Porter
4. Mr. Britling Sees It Through by H. G. Wells
5. Life and Gabriella by Ellen Glasgow
6. The Real Adventure by Henry Kitchell Webster
7. Bars of Iron by Ethel M. Dell
8. Nan of Music Mountain by Frank H. Spearman
9. Dear Enemy by Jean Webster
10. The Heart of Rachael by Kathleen Norris

== 1917 ==
1. Mr. Britling Sees It Through by H. G. Wells
2. The Light in the Clearing by Irving Bacheller
3. The Red Planet by William J. Locke
4. The Road to Understanding by Eleanor H. Porter
5. Wildfire by Zane Grey
6. Christine by Alice Cholmondeley
7. In the Wilderness by Robert S. Hichens
8. His Family by Ernest Poole
9. The Definite Object by Jeffery Farnol
10. The Hundredth Chance by Ethel M. Dell

== 1918 ==
1. The U.P. Trail by Zane Grey
2. The Tree of Heaven by May Sinclair
3. The Amazing Interlude by Mary Roberts Rinehart
4. Dere Mable by Edward Streeter
5. Oh, Money! Money! by Eleanor H. Porter
6. Greatheart by Ethel M. Dell
7. The Major by Ralph Connor
8. The Pawns Count by E. Phillips Oppenheim
9. A Daughter of the Land by Gene Stratton Porter
10. Sonia by Stephen McKenna

== 1919 ==
1. The Four Horseman of the Apocalypse by Vicente Blasco Ibáñez
2. The Arrow of Gold by Joseph Conrad
3. The Desert of Wheat by Zane Grey
4. Dangerous Days by Mary Roberts Rinehart
5. The Sky Pilot in No Man's Land by Ralph Connor
6. The Re-Creation of Brian Kent by Harold Bell Wright
7. Dawn by Eleanor H. Porter
8. The Tin Soldier by Temple Bailey
9. Christopher and Columbus by Elizabeth von Arnim
10. In Secret by Robert W. Chambers
