= The Crossing (Churchill novel) =

Novel by Winston Churchill

- Author: Winston Churchill
- Language: English
- Genre: Novel
- Publisher: Macmillan
- Publication date: May 1904
- Publication place: United States
- Media type: Print (hardcover)
- Pages: 598

The Crossing is a 1904 best-selling novel by American writer Winston Churchill. It was the best-selling novel in the United States in 1904, and includes illustrations by Sydney Adamson and Lilian Bayliss. A portion of the book first appeared in December 1903 in Collier's under the title The Borderland.

The last of Churchill's sweeping historical novels, the plot concerns the westward expansion of the United States, including the settlement of Kentucky.

A stage adaptation written by Churchill and Louis Evan Shipman (who had also worked on the stage adaptation of The Crisis) debuted in 1905 and briefly ran on Broadway in January 1906 for eight performances. One commentator summed up the play's short run as one that "very soon met with disaster."
