= The Crisis (1916 film) =

1916 film by Colin Campbell

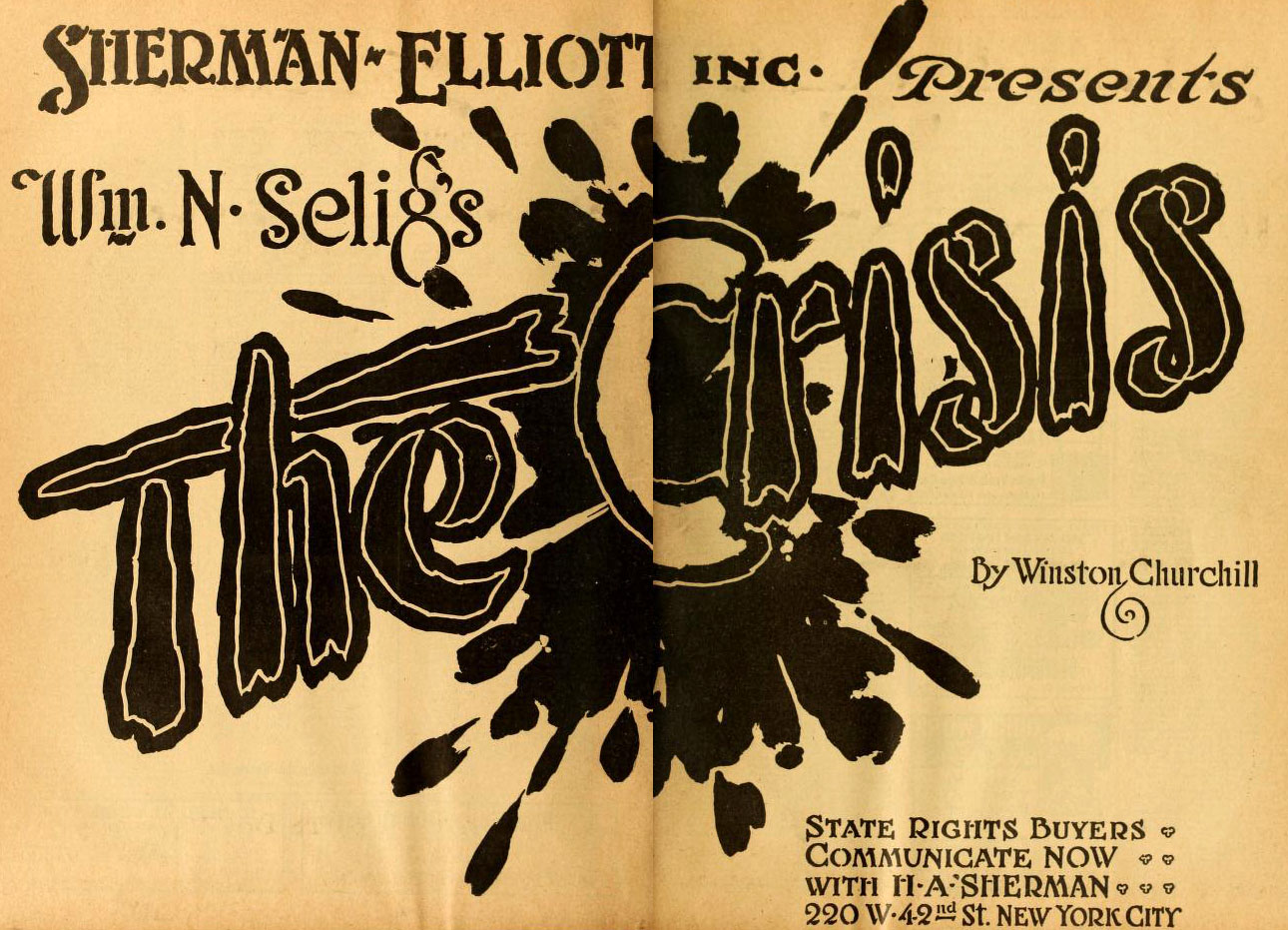
- Directed by: Colin Campbell
- Written by: Colin Campbell (scenario)
- Based on: The Crisis by Winston Churchill
- Starring: George Fawcett; Matt B. Snyder; Marshall Neilan
- Cinematography: G. McKenzie
- Music by: Michel Mowschine
- Distributed by: Selig Polyscope Company
- Release dates: September 29, 1916 (limited screenings); February 25, 1917 (general release)
- Running time: 100 minutes
- Country: United States
- Language: Silent (English intertitles)

The full film

The Crisis is a 1916 American silent historical drama film produced by William N. Selig and directed by Colin Campbell. The film is based on the American Civil War novel The Crisis by American novelist Winston Churchill. The novel was adapted into a play and produced on Broadway in 1902.

A copy of this film is preserved at the Library of Congress.

== Cast ==
- George Fawcett - Judge Silas Whipple
- Matt B. Snyder - Col. Comyn Carvel
- Bessie Eyton - Virginia Carvel
- Tom Santschi - Stephen Brice
- Eugenie Besserer - Mrs. Brice
- Marshall Neilan - Clarence Colfax
- Frank Weed - Eliphalet Hopper
- Will Machin - Lige Brent
- Sam D. Drane - Abraham Lincoln
- Cecil Holland - Gen. W. T. Sherman
- Leo Pierson - Jack Brinsmade
- George Snyder -
- Frank Green -
- Alfred E. Green - Carl Richter
- Tom Mix - stunts (uncredited)

== Reception ==
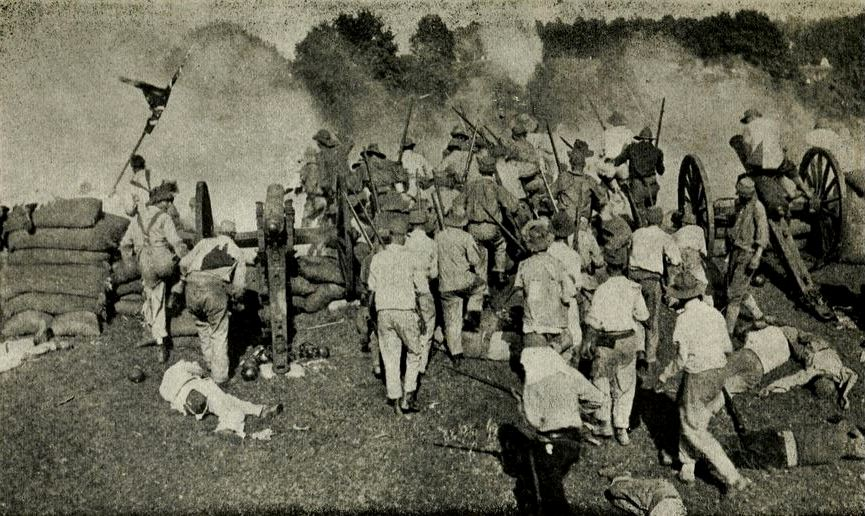
Still of the fighting at Vicksburg

The Crisis sought to mine the success of 1915's The Birth of a Nation. It was popular in theatres, but the United States' entry into World War I in April 1917 effectively ended interest in another Civil War film in light of the new war.

== Production notes ==
The production was shot in part in Mississippi and St. Louis, Missouri. Actor Matt B. Snyder was a real-life Civil War veteran having served in the Union Navy on the gunship USS Essex. Snyder and Sam D. Drane, who portrayed Abraham Lincoln in the film, died prior to its general release in 1917.

== See also ==
- List of films and television shows about the American Civil War
