= The Crisis (novel) =

Novel by Winston Churchill

- Author: Winston Churchill
- Illustrator: Howard Chandler Christy
- Language: English
- Genre: Historical novel
- Publisher: The Macmillan Company
- Publication date: 1901
- Publication place: US
- Media type: Print
- Pages: 522
- Preceded by: Richard Carvel
- Followed by: The Crossing

The Crisis is an historical novel published in 1901 by the American novelist Winston Churchill. It was the best-selling book in the United States in 1901. The novel is set in the years leading up to the first battles of the American Civil War, mostly in the divided state of Missouri. It follows the fortunes of young Stephen Brice, a man with Union and abolitionist sympathies, and his involvement with a Southern family.

== Story ==
Set in the author's home town of St. Louis, Missouri, the site of pivotal events in the western theater of the Civil War, with historically prominent citizens having both Northern and Southern sympathies. St. Louis was also the pre-war home of both Ulysses Grant and William T. Sherman, each of whom is depicted in the book.

Romantic tension develops between the four main characters: one, Virginia "Jinny" Carvel, the fashionable daughter of Comyn Carvel, a southern gentleman of the old school; another, Clarence Maxwell Colfax, her n'er-do-well cousin who becomes a stalwart cavalier in the Southern cause in an effort to win Jinny's approval; the third, Stephen A. Brice, an earnest young lawyer from Boston who antagonizes Virginia by his zeal for Abraham Lincoln's cause; and the fourth, Eliphalet Hopper, a hard-working clerk with ambitions to advance himself both financially and socially.

The crisis of the title is provoked by Abraham Lincoln's opposition to the extension of slavery, and the power of his personal integrity to win people to his cause, including the young lawyer Brice, who becomes a devoted admirer and proponent following a personal interview on the eve of the Freeport debate between Lincoln and Stephen Douglas. This meeting depicts Lincoln's determination to advance the cause of freedom through the possible (and likely) sacrifice of his own political ambitions, and is related with a very believable combination of rustic humor and political acumen on Lincoln's part.

The events prior to Lincoln's nomination and his eventual election to the Presidency elicit different reactions among the citizens of St. Louis, from the determined antipathy of the Southern sympathizers, to the equally determined patriotism of the population of German immigrants who have fled from their homeland and whose devotion to liberty has caused them to transfer their allegiance to the ideal of American democracy. One of them is Stephen's fellow lawyer, Carl Richter, who bears the scar of a duel fought with broadswords between himself and an arrogant German noble; a duel based on an actual incident in Berlin.

Although the personal rivalries follow an almost soap opera style formula, the overall events of the war from the perspective of St. Louis and the Western theater of war are dramatically depicted with well-researched authenticity, and both Grant and Sherman are depicted as having a personal involvement in the lives of the main characters. A pivotal moment in the heroine's life is presented through her transformation from being self-centered and self-absorbed to becoming self-sacrificing and dedicated to easing the suffering of those around her. This is represented as a Christian metaphor for the way that God uses challenges to mould a person's character.

In the end, Virginia and the young lawyer find themselves meeting Lincoln together to try to save her cousin's life after Clarence is condemned as a Southern spy, and together they experience Lincoln's power to bring about a reconciliation between them, just before the national reconciliation which Lincoln proposed between the North and the South would be aborted by John Wilkes Booth's bullet.

This novel is a story about Abraham Lincoln in the same sense that the novel Ben Hur is "a tale of the Christ," in that Lincoln only appears twice, for a total of about two dozen pages, but his philosophy is a dynamic presence throughout the story. The author portrays Lincoln as being the sacrifice America had to pay to redeem it from the sin of slavery. In his post-script, the author offers this justification for supporting Lincoln's point of view, "Lincoln loved both the South and the North".

== Reception ==
The book received good reviews, and was the best-selling book in the United States for 1901, according to The Bookman magazine.

== Adaptations ==
=== Stage ===
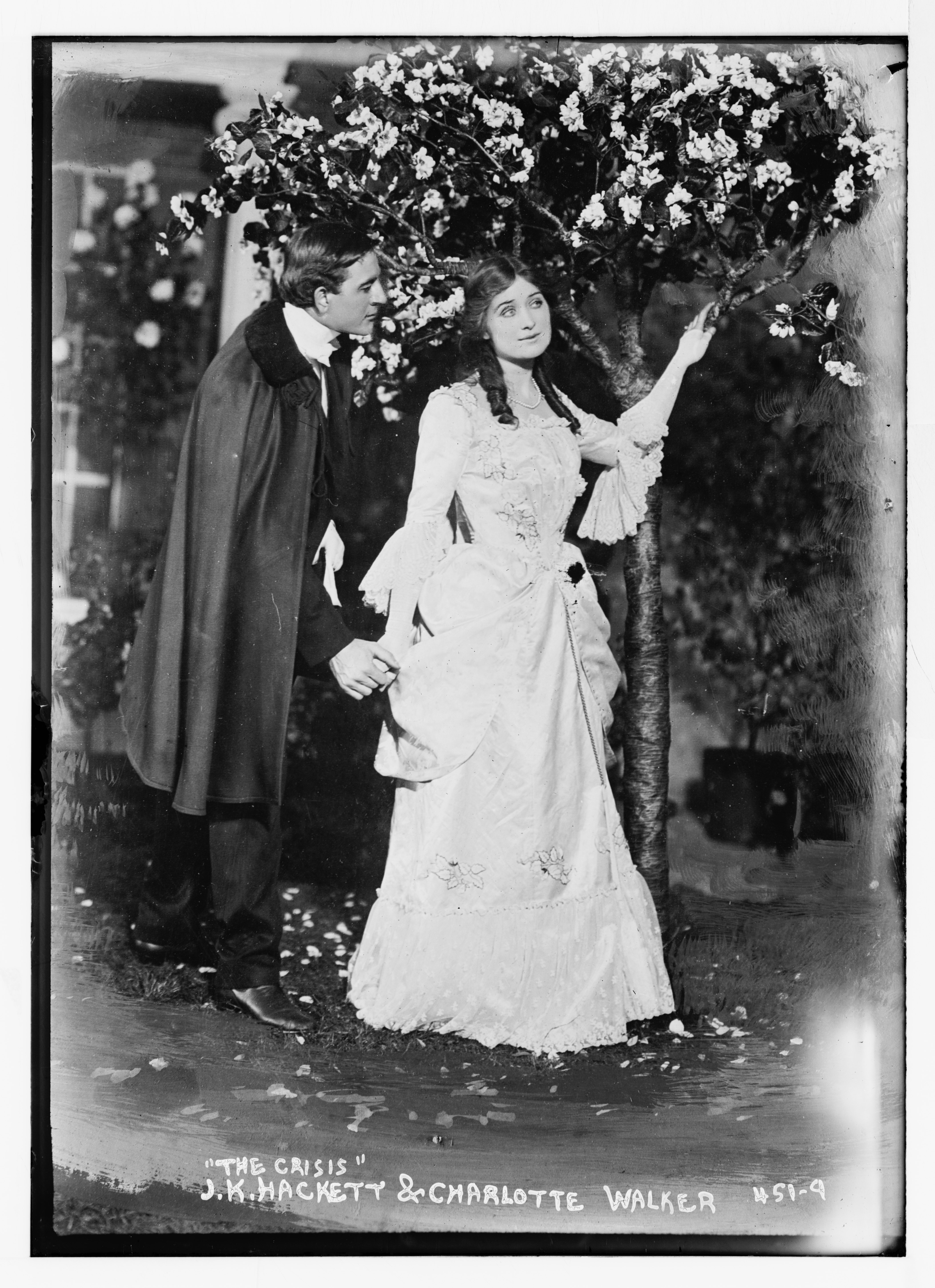
James K. Hackett and Charlotte Walker in The Crisis (1902)

The author adapted the novel into a play of four acts in 1902. James K. Hackett produced, directed and starred in the play, appearing in numerous cities, and at Wallack's Theater on Broadway on November 11, 1902, for 50 performances. The scenes were set entirely in St. Louis, with only the fictitious characters as the cast. Historical personages and events are talked about, not shown. The play begins with Brice's arrival in 1857, and ends at the reception room of Judge Whipple's office after the Judge's death and Brice threatens Eliphalet Hopper with exposure of his crooked dealings if he exposes Col. Carvel to the authorities.

=== Film ===
The book was adapted into a silent film of the same name in 1916.
