= The Inside of the Cup (film) =

1921 film

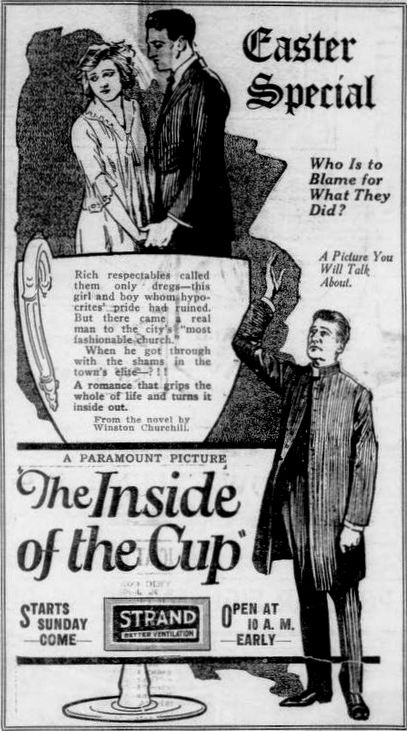
- Newspaper ad
- Directed by: Albert Capellani
- Screenplay by: Albert Capellani; George DuBois Proctor
- Based on: The Inside of the Cup by Winston Churchill
- Starring: William P. Carleton; David Torrence; Edith Hallor; John Bohn; Marguerite Clayton; Richard Carlyle; Margaret Seddon
- Cinematography: Allen G. Siegler
- Production company: Cosmopolitan Productions
- Distributed by: Paramount Pictures
- Release date: January 16, 1921
- Running time: 70 minutes
- Country: United States
- Language: Silent (English intertitles)

The Inside of the Cup is a surviving 1921 American silent drama film directed by Albert Capellani and written by Albert Capellani and George DuBois Proctor based upon the best-selling novel of the same name by Winston Churchill. The film stars William P. Carleton, David Torrence, Edith Hallor, John Bohn, Marguerite Clayton, Richard Carlyle and Margaret Seddon. The film was released on January 16, 1921, by Paramount Pictures.

== Cast ==
- William P. Carleton as John Hodder
- David Torrence as Eldon Parr
- Edith Hallor as Alison Parr
- John Bohn as Preston Parr
- Marguerite Clayton as Kate Marcy
- Richard Carlyle as Richard Garvin
- Margaret Seddon as Mrs. Garvin
- Albert Roccardi as Wallis Plimpton
- Frank A. Lyons as Ferguson
- Henry Morey as Beatty
- Irene Delroy as Kate Marcy's Friend
- George Storey as Garvin's Child

== Preservation status ==
- A print exists in the Library of Congress collection.
