= Mabel H. Churchill =

American socialite and suffragist (1873–1945)

Mabel Harlakenden Hall Churchill (September 5, 1873 – May 27, 1945) was an American socialite and suffragist.

== Biography ==
Mabel Harlakenden Hall was born in New Haven, Connecticut, to George and Lucretia Hall on September 5, 1873. She was part of a wealthy St. Louis family, and both her mother and grandmother were involved with the women's suffrage movement. She attended Mary Institute in St. Louis. Churchill served as treasurer for the Cornish Equal Suffrage League, formed in 1911. She took part in a suffrage automobile tour in New Jersey, along with Antoinette Funk in 1915. Churchill also worked as the treasurer for the National American Woman Suffrage Association (NAWSA). In 1915, she was one of three final candidates for president of NAWSA.

== Personal life ==
On October 22, 1895, Mabel Harlakenden Hall married the author Winston Churchill. Her fortune allowed her husband the ability to pursue his career as a novelist full time. In 1899, the couple moved to a large, 30-plus room colonial home in Cornish, which they named "Harlakenden Hall" after Mabel. In May 1913 and June 1915, President Woodrow Wilson used Harlakenden Hall as a vacation home. In 1923, the house burned and the family moved to Plainfield, New Hampshire.

Churchill died in Plainfield on May 27, 1945. She was the model for Cleopatra in Maxfield Parrish's 1917 painting, Cleopatra.
