= Harlakenden =

Coordinates: 43.5169°N 72.3929°W

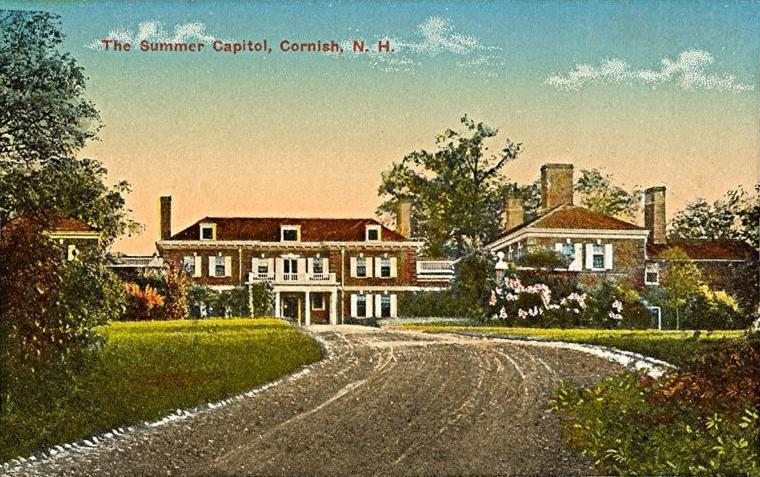

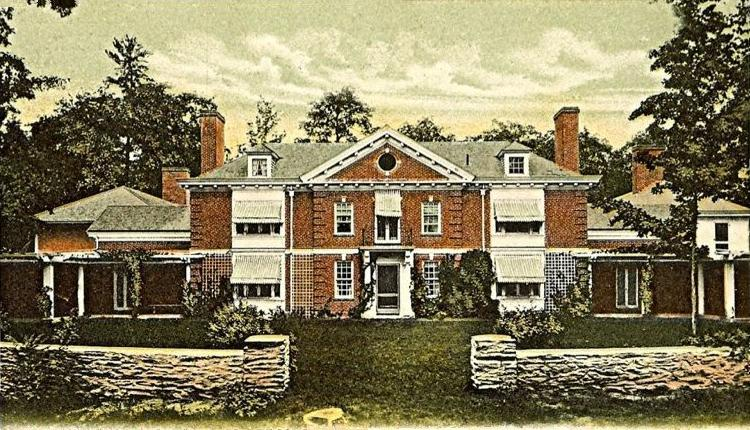

Harlakenden, located in Cornish, New Hampshire, was the residence of American novelist Winston Churchill, and was also the Summer White House of Woodrow Wilson from 1913 until 1917. President Wilson spent his summers at Harlakenden Hall golfing, entertaining guests and taking automobile tours.

Harlakenden Hall was a thirty-room colonial-style brick home built in 1899. It occupied a spot on a bluff on with hundreds of acres of land. Harlakenden Hall was named after Mabel Harlakenden Hall Churchill.

It was destroyed by fire on October 6, 1923. During the 1923 fire, nearly 200 residents formed a bucket brigade to move water from the Connecticut River. Furniture in the house was saved by volunteer workers. At the time of the fire, the house was valued at $150,000.

== Notable guests ==
- William Gibbs McAdoo.
- Francis Bowes Sayre Sr.
- Woodrow Wilson.
- Jessie Wilson Sayre.

== See also ==
- List of residences of presidents of the United States
- New Hampshire historical marker no. 16: Winston Churchill
