= The Inside of the Cup =

Novel by Winston Churchill

- Author: Winston Churchill
- Illustrator: Howard Giles (book) / James Montgomery Flagg (serialization)
- Language: English
- Publisher: Macmillan
- Publication date: May 1913
- Publication place: United States
- Media type: Print (hardcover)

The Inside of the Cup is a 1913 best-selling novel by American writer Winston Churchill. The story was first serialized in Hearst's Magazine from April 1912 through July 1913 and was released in book form in May 1913. The best-selling book in the United States for 1913, it sparked a nationwide debate about the role of Christianity in modern life.

== Plot ==
The book title derives from the Gospel of Matthew (23:26), as quoted early in the novel: "Woe unto you, scribes and Pharisees, hypocrites! For ye make clean the outside of the cup and of the platter, but within they are full of extortion and excess."

John Hodder is recruited from a small town and congregation somewhere in the East to become rector of the august St. John's Church in a large Midwestern city (modeled on St. Louis). Originally built in a rich area of the city, the surrounding area of the church including now-infamous "Dalton Street" has fallen into decay. But the church patrons include the wealthiest of the city, who travel to church on Sunday from their new mansions on the west side of the city, and who desire an "orthodox" minister who will preach a Christianity which will not question the growth of corporate power and the corrupting influence of concentrating wealth in America. Hodder develops a close friendship with Eldon Parr, the most wealthy and powerful man in the church. This is remarkable in that Parr has few close friends. Hodder learns of Parr's intense loneliness and unhappiness, being widowed and estranged from his son and daughter.

Hodder's failure to change his congregation's worldview causes the minister to undergo a spiritual crisis. He meets Josiah Bentley, one of founders of the church who left when financially devastated by Parr, but who has developed a network for helping the poor in the neighborhood surrounding the church. Hodder eventually disregards his "orthodox" views and preaches what he understands to be the core teachings of Jesus – to love and serve mankind. This spawns a huge battle between the old guard at the church and those who are deeply touched by Hodder's message, including Parr's daughter Alison. Though deprived of his salary by the vestry, the bishop is heartened by Hodder's transformation and tells him he will not recommend him for an ecclesiastical trial for heresy.

== Reception ==
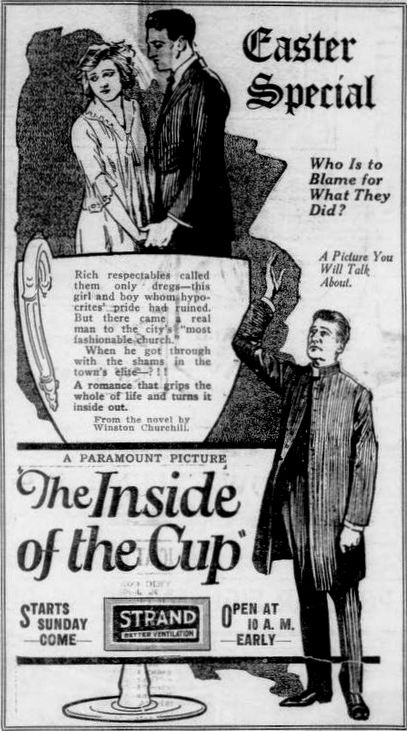
Newspaper ad for the 1921 film

According to The Bookman, the novel was the best selling book in the United States in both 1913 and 1914, the first time a book had been the best-selling book for two years since that publication started reporting best-sellers in 1895. Publishers Weekly, which began its own bestseller list in 1913, had the book listed as first in 1913, and third in 1914. The New York Times also selected it as one of the best books of 1913.

Critics complained about the didactic nature of the novel, yet the purpose of the book for Churchill was to be a vessel for the delivery of his opinions on religion. Since 1906's Coniston, Churchill had been moving into the role of societal critic, and wholly did so with this novel. And while critics thought its didactic nature would harm sales, that was proven very wrong.

The book caused widespread national debate, with ministers' sermons and many church organizations and other groups discussing its merits, and with vocal critics and supporters on all sides. Naval theorist Alfred Thayer Mahan wrote the most publicized critique, published in the New York Churchman. Like other critics, Mahan was concerned that the "gigantic fabric of faith" was endangered by Churchill's disregard of a need to literally believe in teachings such as the virgin birth and the resurrection.

== Film adaptation ==
In January 1921 a film adaptation of the novel was released, directed by Albert Capellani, and featuring William P. Carleton as John Hodder, David Torrence as Eldon Parr, and Edith Hallor as Alison Parr. As of April 2013, the movie is reported to have survived but without a projection print as of yet.
