= The Far Country =

The Far Country may refer to:

- The Far Country (film), a 1954 American Western film directed by Anthony Mann
- The Far Country (novel), a 1952 novel by Nevil Shute
- The Far Country (album), a 2005 album by Andrew Peterson
- The Far Country (play), a 2022 play by Lloyd Suh

== See also ==
- "Far Country", a song by Mike Oldfield from the album Earth Moving
