= Winston Churchill (novelist) =

American novelist (1871–1947)

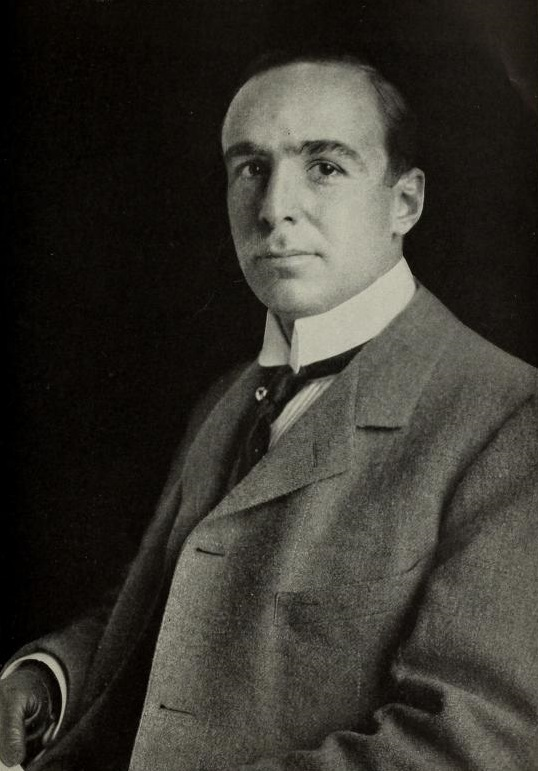
- Winston Churchill in 1908
- Born: November 10, 1871; St. Louis, Missouri, US
- Died: March 12, 1947 (aged 75); Winter Park, Florida, US
- Occupations: Novelist, writer
- Spouse: Mabel H. Churchill (m. 1895; died 1945)
- Children: 3
- Writing career
- Genres: Non-fiction; Short story; Historical fiction
- Notable works: Mr. Crewe's Career; Mr. Keegan's Elopement; Coniston; The Crossing; A Far Country; A Traveller In War-Time

Winston Churchill (November 10, 1871 – March 12, 1947) was an American best-selling novelist of the early twentieth century.

He is nowadays overshadowed, even as a writer, by the more famous British statesman of the same name, to whom he was not related.

== Early life ==
Churchill was born in St. Louis, Missouri, the son of Edward Spalding Churchill by his marriage to Emma Bell Blaine. He attended Smith Academy in Missouri and the United States Naval Academy, where he graduated in 1894. At the Naval Academy, he was conspicuous in scholarship and also in general student activities. He became an expert fencer and he organized at Annapolis the first eight-oared crew, which he captained for two years. After graduation he became an editor of the Army and Navy Journal. He resigned from the US Navy to pursue a writing career. In 1895, he became managing editor of the Cosmopolitan Magazine, but in less than a year he retired from that, to have more time for writing. While he would be most successful as a novelist, he was also a published poet and essayist.

== Career ==
His first novel to appear in book form was The Celebrity (1898). However, Mr. Keegan's Elopement had been published in 1896 as a magazine serial and was republished as an illustrated hardback book in 1903. Churchill's next novel—Richard Carvel (1899) — was a phenomenal success. The novel was the third best-selling work of American fiction in 1899 and eighth-best in 1900, according to Alice Hackett's 70 Years of Best Sellers. It sold some two million copies in a nation of only 76 million people, and made Churchill rich. His other commercially successful novels included The Crisis (1901), The Crossing (1904), Coniston (1906), Mr. Crewe's Career (1908) and The Inside of the Cup (1913), all of which ranked first on the best-selling American novel list in the years indicated.

Churchill's early novels were historical, but his later works were set in contemporary America. He often sought to include his political ideas into his novels.

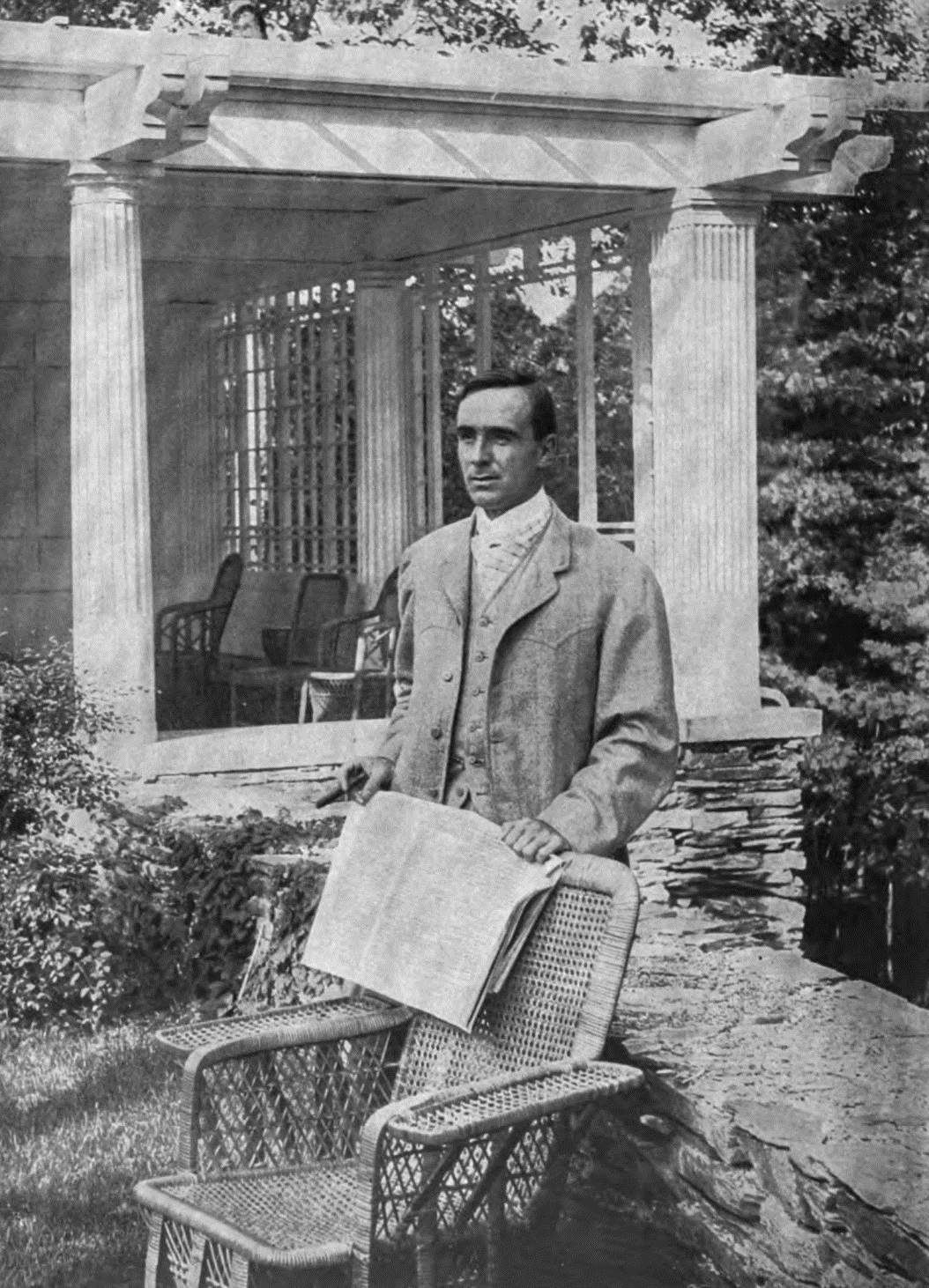
Churchill at his home, Windsor, Vermont

In 1898, Churchill commissioned Charles Platt to design a mansion in Cornish, New Hampshire. Churchill moved there the following year and named it Harlakenden House. From 1913 to 1915, he leased it to Woodrow Wilson, who used it as his summer residence. Churchill became involved in the Cornish Art Colony and went into politics, winning election to the state legislature in 1903 and 1905. In 1906, he unsuccessfully sought the Republican nomination for governor of New Hampshire. In 1912, he was nominated as the Progressive candidate for governor but did not win the election and did not seek public office again. In 1917, he toured the battlefields of World War I and wrote his first non-fiction work about what he saw.

Sometime after the move to Cornish, he took up painting in watercolors and became known for his landscapes. Some of his works are in the collections of the Hood Museum of Art (part of Hopkins Center for the Arts at Dartmouth College) in Hanover, New Hampshire, and the Saint-Gaudens National Historic Site in Cornish, New Hampshire.

In 1919, Churchill decided to stop writing and withdrew from public life. He was gradually forgotten by the public. In 1923, Harlakenden House burned down. The Churchills moved to an 1838 Federal estate, part of the Cornish Colony called Windfield House (now called Hillside) at 23 Freeman Road in Plainfield, furnishing it with items saved from the fire. In 1940, The Uncharted Way, his first book in twenty years, was published. The book examined Churchill's thoughts on religion. He did not seek to publicize the book and it received little attention. Shortly before his death, he even noted, "It is very difficult now for me to think of myself as a writer of novels, as all that seems to belong to another life."

== Death ==
Churchill died in Winter Park, Florida, in 1947 of a heart attack. He was predeceased in 1945 by his wife of fifty years, the former Mabel Harlakenden Hall. He is featured on a New Hampshire historical marker (number 16) along New Hampshire Route 12A in Cornish.

Churchill and his wife had three children. Their son John Dwight Winston Churchill was married to Mary Deshon Hand, daughter of Judge Learned Hand. Another son Creighton Churchill was a well-known writer on wines. Journalist Chris Churchill of Albany, New York is his great-grandson.

== The British statesman ==
In the 1890s, Churchill's writings first came to be confused with those of the namesake British writer and statesman. At that time, the American was the much better known of the two, and it was the Englishman who wrote to his American counterpart about the confusion their names were causing among their readers.

They agreed that the British Churchill should adopt the pen name "Winston Spencer Churchill", using his full surname, "Spencer-Churchill". After a few early editions this was abbreviated to "Winston S. Churchill"—which remained the British Churchill's pen name. The two men arranged to meet on two occasions when one of them happened to be in the other's country, but were never closely acquainted.

Their lives had some other coincidental parallels. They both gained their tertiary education at service colleges and briefly served (during the same period) as officers in their respective countries' armed forces (one was a naval officer, the other an army officer). Both Churchills were keen amateur watercolor painters, as well as writers. Both were also politicians, although the British Churchill's political career was far more illustrious.

== Works ==
=== Novels ===
- Mr. Keegan's Elopement in magazine format (1896)
- The Celebrity (1898)
- Richard Carvel (1899)
- The Crisis (1901)
- Mr. Keegan's Elopement in hardback (1903)
- The Crossing (1904)
- Coniston (1906)
- Mr. Crewe's Career (1908)
- A Modern Chronicle (1910)
- The Inside of the Cup (1913)
- A Far Country (1915)
- The Dwelling-Place of Light (1917)

=== Other writings ===
- Richard Carvel; Play produced on Broadway, (1900–1901)
- The Crisis; Play produced on Broadway, (1902)
- The Crossing; Play produced on Broadway, (1906)
- The Title Mart; Play produced on Broadway, (1906)
- A Traveller In War-Time (1918)
- Dr. Jonathan; A play in three acts (1919)
- The Uncharted Way (1940)

== Filmography ==
- The Crisis (dir. Colin Campbell, 1916)
- The Dwelling Place of Light (dir. Jack Conway, 1920)
- The Inside of the Cup (dir. Albert Capellani, 1921)

Party political offices
First	Progressive nominee for Governor of New Hampshire; 1912	Succeeded by Henry D. Allison
