= Coniston (novel) =

1906 novel by American writer Winston Churchill

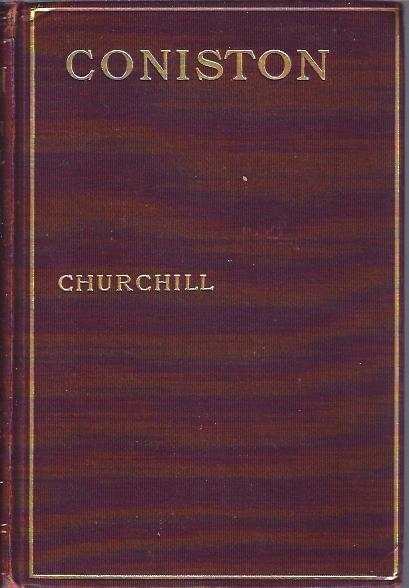
- Author: Winston Churchill
- Illustrator: Florence Scovel Shinn
- Language: English
- Genre: Novel
- Publisher: Macmillan
- Publication date: June 1906
- Publication place: United States
- Media type: Print (hardcover)
- Pages: 543 pp

Coniston is a 1906 best-selling novel by American writer Winston Churchill.

== Background ==
The plot of the historical novel concerns New Hampshire politics, where Churchill lived most of his adult life. Churchill was elected to the state legislature in 1903 and 1905, and unsuccessfully sought the Republican nomination for governor in 1906 at the same time Coniston was topping the best selling lists. The political boss character in the book, Jethro Bass, was based on New Hampshire politician Ruel Durkee. A former U.S. Senator from New Hampshire, William E. Chandler, felt compelled to defend Durkee, publishing a pamphlet and writing letters to editors to claim that Durkee was a model citizen and not a model of corruption.

Contemporary writers identified the places in the novel with their real counterparts in New Hampshire. The small hamlet of Coniston itself is Croydon, New Hampshire (where Durkee lived), Brampton is Newport, Harwich is Claremont, Clovelly is Cornish, and "Coniston Water", the local river, is the Sugar River. The Pelican Hotel is the Eagle Hotel in Concord.

== Reception ==
It was the best-selling novel in the United States in 1906, and also included illustrations by Florence Scovel Shinn.

== Legacy ==
The local market in Croydon is still called the "Coniston General Store" after the book, and a nearby lake was renamed "Lake Coniston" in 1943. The YMCA's Camp Coniston took its name after the lake in 1969.
