= Richard Carvel =

Novel by Winston Churchill (novelist)

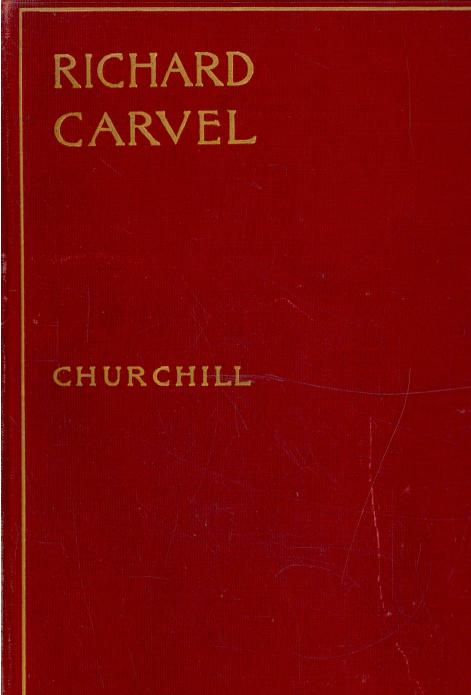
- 1899 cover
- Author: Winston Churchill
- Illustrator: Carlton T. Chapman and Malcolm Fraser
- Language: English
- Genre: Historical novel
- Publisher: The Macmillan Company
- Publication date: 1899
- Publication place: USA
- Media type: Print
- Followed by: The Crisis

Richard Carvel is a historical novel by the American novelist Winston Churchill. It was first published in 1899 and was exceptionally successful, selling around two million copies and making the author a rich man. The novel takes the form of the memoirs of an eighteenth-century gentleman, the Richard Carvel of the title, and runs to eight volumes. It is set partly in Maryland and partly in London, England, during the American revolutionary era

== Plot summary ==
Foreword

The novel opens with a fictitious foreword, a brief note dated 1876, in which the purported editor of the memoirs, Daniel Clapsaddle Carvel, claims that they are just as his grandfather, Richard Carvel, wrote them, all the more realistic for their imperfections.

Volume One

The first volume concerns Richard Carvel's boyhood and schooldays. Orphaned at an early age, Richard is raised by his grandfather, Lionel Carvel of Carvel Hall, a wealthy loyalist respected by all sections of the community. Richard describes their way of life, his growing love for his neighbor, Dorothy Manners, and the hostility of his uncle, Grafton Carvel. Richard witnesses a demonstration against a tax collector in Annapolis as a result of the Stamp Act 1765 and grieves his grandfather by his adoption of revolutionary political views.

Volume Two

Mr Allen, Richard's new tutor, tricks him into deceiving his ailing grandfather. Richard is tormented by the coquettishness of Dorothy. At Richard's eighteenth birthday party, he learns that she is to go to England.

Volume Three

With the third volume, the main action of the novel begins. Through the scheming of Grafton Carvel and Mr Allen, Richard fights a duel with Lord Comyn. He is wounded, but becomes fast friends with the lord. His grandfather learns that his political opinions are unchanged but forgives him, partly through the intercession of Colonel Washington. After his recovery, Richard is attacked on the road and kidnapped. He is taken aboard a pirate ship, the Black Moll. There is a fight with a brigantine, in which the pirate ship sinks.

Volume Four

In the fourth volume, the protagonist continues to meet with sudden reversals of fortune. Richard is rescued and befriended by the captain of the brigantine, John Paul, who is sailing to Solway. In Scotland, John Paul is shunned, and vows to turn his back on his country. They take a post chaise to London, and in Windsor meet Horace Walpole. In London they are imprisoned in a sponging-house, from where they are rescued by Lord Comyn and Dorothy.

Volume Five

Volumes five and six are set in London, where the glamor and corruption of fashionable society forms a contrast with the plain and honest values of the emerging republic, embodied in the protagonist. Richard is introduced to London society, where Dorothy is an admired beauty. He makes friends with Charles James Fox and incurs the enmity of the Duke of Chartersea. Richard declares his love to Dorothy but is rejected.

Volume Six

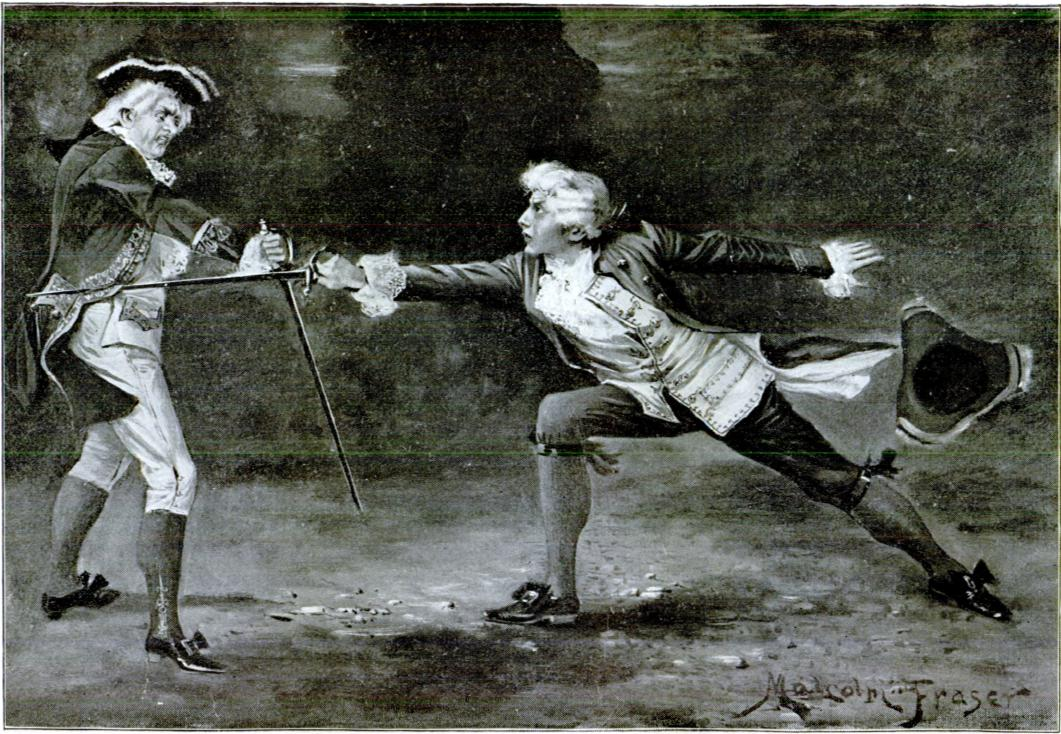
Carvel duels with the Duke of Chartersea, frontispiece illustration by Malcolm Fraser

Richard risks his life in a wager but survives against the odds. He visits the House of Commons, and hears Edmund Burke and Fox speak. At Vauxhall Gardens he is tricked into a duel with the Duke, while Lord Comyn is injured saving him from a second assailant. Later he hears that his grandfather has died, and that his uncle Grafton has inherited the estate, leaving him penniless.

Volume Seven

Richard returns to America, where he learns his grandfather had believed him dead. Rejecting Grafton's overtures, he accepts a place as Mr Swain's factor, and for the next few years faithfully tends the Swain estate, Gordon's Pride. In 1774, the discontent among the colonists begins to escalate.

Volume Eight

The final volume sees the dual, interlinked fruition of the two principal aspects of the novel: the political and the romantic. With the coming of war, Richard sets out to fight for his country. He meets John Paul, now calling himself John Paul Jones, and plans to join the nascent American navy. The early years of the war are represented by a summary by Daniel Clapsaddle Carvel, and Richard's narrative resumes at the start of the North Sea action between the Bonhomme Richard, captained by Jones, and the Serapis. Richard is severely wounded, and Jones arranges for him to be nursed by Dorothy. The end of the book sees Richard back in Maryland as master of Carvel Hall, married to his childhood sweetheart.

== Characters ==
The Carvels

- Richard Carvel, the narrator, a headstrong and hot-tempered young man
- Lionel Carvel, Richard's grandfather, a wealthy shipowner, loyal to the Crown
- Captain Jack Carvel, Lionel's older son, Richard's father, a brave and reckless soldier, killed in the French war when Richard is a small child
- Elizabeth Carvel, Richard's mother, adopted by the Carvels as a child after a shipwreck
- Grafton Carvel, Lionel's younger son, jealous, manipulative and unscrupulous; estranged from the family after questioning Elizabeth's parentage
- Caroline Carvel, Grafton's wife, the daughter of a successful grocer
- Philip Carvel, the son of Grafton and Caroline, Richard's cousin
- Daniel Clapsaddle Carvel, Richard's grandson, the editor of his grandfather's memoirs

The Carvel Hall servants

- Mrs. Willis, the housekeeper
- Scipio, the butler
- Chess, the cook
- Harvey, the coachman and head groom
- Hugo, Richard's personal servant

Historical figures

- George Washington
- John Paul, later John Paul Jones, a sea captain
- Horace Walpole, a cultured man-about-town
- Charles James Fox, an English politician and inveterate gambler
- Lord Baltimore
- David Garrick, an actor
- Edmund Burke, a Whig politician and orator

Others

- Captain Daniel Clapsaddle, a close friend of the Carvel family
- Dorothy Manners, Richard's capricious childhood playmate, later a society beauty
- Marmaduke Manners, Dorothy's foppish father
- Dr Courtenay, a Maryland macaroni who courts Dorothy
- Patty Swain, Richard's friend, a sympathetic Maryland girl
- Henry Swain, Patty's father, a Whig lawyer
- Tom Swain, Patty's brother, a drunken wastrel
- Mr Allen, an amoral, self-serving clergyman, tutor to Philip and Richard
- Jack, Lord Comyn, Richard's friend, a great-hearted English nobleman
- The Duke of Chartersea, a dissolute aristocrat
- Banks, Richard's faithful English servant

== Link with The Crisis ==
Churchill's 1901 novel, The Crisis, like Richard Carvel, was part of a sequence of novels set at crucial periods of American history. While not otherwise a sequel, its heroine, Virginia Carvel, is the great-granddaughter of the protagonist of the earlier novel. His 'diary' is mentioned in the book.

== Reception and literary significance ==
The review for the New York Times Saturday Review in July 1899 described Richard Carvel as "a notable novel... an event of importance in American fiction", going on to say that it was "the most extensive piece of semi-historical fiction which has yet come from an American hand... the skill with which the materials have been handled justifies the largeness of the plan".

The review in the New York Tribune described the book as "a serious historical novel, embracing a romantic courtship and many events on land and sea, in Maryland and in England, which involve famous personages like Washington, Fox and Horace Walpole." The reviewer took issue with the characterization, saying that the principal characters fail "to get themselves bodied forth in absolute reality," but concluded that "Richard Carvel is a remarkably workmanlike production, considering the present limitations of the author."

A letter from George Middleton to the New York Times praises Richard Carvel for its dramatic qualities, for its portrayal of past times, and for the character of Dorothy Manners, "the most fascinating female character that has appeared in the recent novels".

In November 1899, Richard Carvel provoked a mild controversy in the pages of the New York Times Saturday Review when an anonymous letter writer pointed out certain similarities between the "now famous" novel and Hugh Wynne – Free Quaker by Silas Weir Mitchell, making a veiled accusation of plagiarism. This was rebutted by another correspondent, who pointed out that the first draft of Richard Carvel had been completed five years earlier, two years before the publication of Hugh Wynne. A further letter also drew (unfavorable) comparisons between Churchill's novel and Thackeray's The Virginians.

A later assessment considers the authenticity of the narrative the reason for its remarkable success: "Richard Carvel (1899) is a romantic historical novel of the American Revolutionary period. Though carefully written, the book has the episodic structure characteristic of Churchill. It became a best seller because of the conscientious research that gave remarkable authenticity to events and characters".

== Adaptations ==
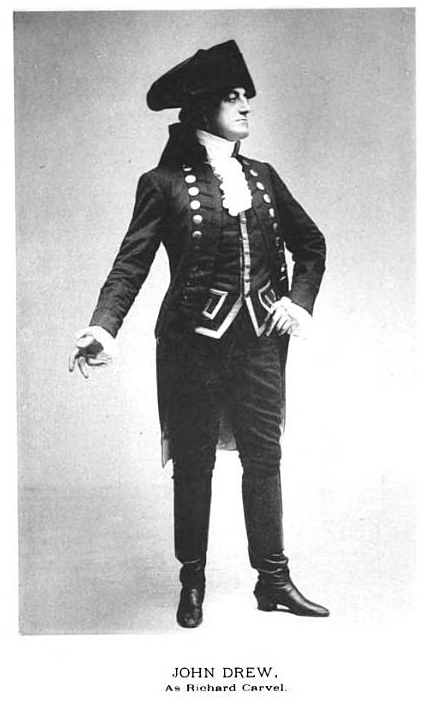
John Drew as Richard Carvel on Broadway

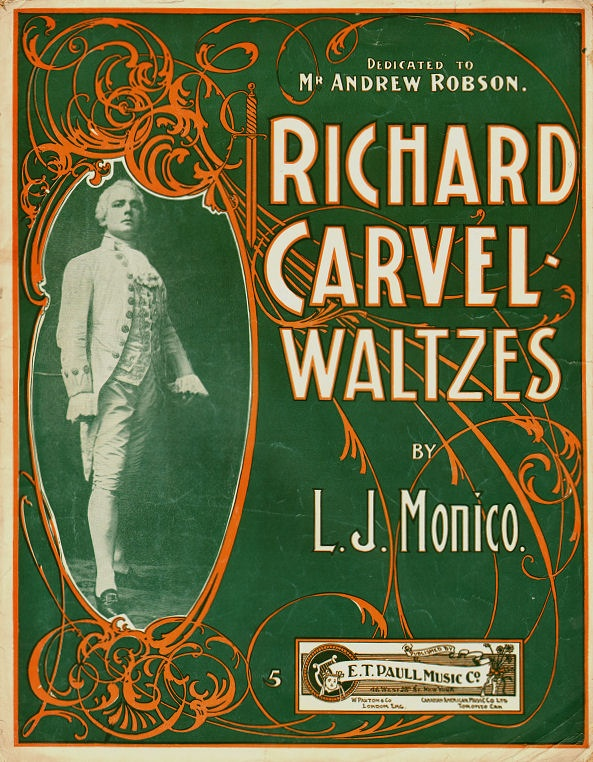

Edward Everett Rose adapted the novel for the stage, and Richard Carvel, the play, appeared on Broadway between September 1900 and January 1901. There were 129 performances in all. Richard Carvel was played by John Drew and Dorothy Manners by Ida Conquest. The play was produced by Charles Frohman at the Empire Theatre.

Waltzes from the play were published as sheet music under the title Richard Carvel Waltzes, with a picture of the character in eighteenth-century dress.

A silent film based on the novel was mooted and started production around 1915, but its IMDb entry notes: "There is no reliable documentation that a film bearing this title was ever completed or released."

== Carvel Hall ==
When Winston Churchill wrote Richard Carvel, he was staying as a paying guest at a Georgian mansion in Annapolis now known as the William Paca House. When the novel achieved its outstanding success, an enterprising developer turned the house into a 200-room hotel and called it Carvel Hall after the Carvels' country house. The Carvel Hall Hotel became very popular, notably with visiting midshipmen, as it was near the United States Naval Academy. However, the house was not the model for the Carvel Hall of the novel, nor for the Carvels' town house. Julian Street had this to say in his 1917 travel book American Adventures:

The Paca house, which as a hotel has acquired the name Carvel Hall, is the house that Winston Churchill had in mind as the Manners house, of his novel "Richard Carvel." A good idea of the house, as it was, may be obtained by visiting the Brice house, next door, for the two are almost twins. When Mr. Churchill was a cadet at Annapolis, before the modern part of the Carvel Hall hotel was built, there were the remains of terraced gardens back of the old mansion, stepping down to an old spring house, and a rivulet which flowed through the grounds was full of watercress. The book describes a party at the house and in these gardens. The Chase house on Maryland Avenue was the one Mr. Churchill thought of as the home of Lionel Carvel, and he described the view from upper windows of this house, over the Harwood house, across the way, to the Severn.

The Tribune in late 1899 reported that Winston Churchill was building a house in Vermont which he proposed to call Carvel Hall.

== See also ==
- History of Maryland in the American Revolution
