= A Far Country (novel) =

Novel by Winston Churchill

- Original edition of the novel from 1915
- Author: Winston Churchill
- Illustrator: Herman Pfiefer
- Language: English
- Genre: Novel
- Publisher: Macmillan
- Publication date: 1915
- Publication place: United States
- Media type: Print (hardcover)
- Pages: 509 pp

A Far Country is a novel by American writer Winston Churchill published in 1915.

== Plot introduction ==
The book follows the career of Hugh Paret from youth to manhood, and how his profession as a corporation lawyer gradually changes his values.

The title is a reference to the Parable of the Prodigal Son, where Luke 15:13 (KJV) provides that the son went "into a far country, and there wasted his substance with riotous living."

== Reception ==
The book received positive reviews, and was the second best-selling novel in the United States in 1915.
