= Bonnie Brier Bush =

Bonnie Brier Bush may refer to:

- "There grows a bonnie brier bush in our Kailyard", a Scottish folk song
- Beside the Bonnie Brier Bush, a book of Scottish shorts stories by Ian Maclaren
- Theatrical performances based on the book
  - 1901 performance produced by Kirke La Shelle
  - 1903 play that was Mabel Brownell's debut
  - 1905 play produced by Lettice Fairfax
- The Bonnie Brier Bush, a 1921 film
