= John Hepburn Millar =

Scottish lawyer and author

J.H. Millar (John Hepburn Millar) (born 1864 and died 1929) is noted for coining the term the Kailyard for a group of Scottish writers: including J. M. Barrie, Ian Maclaren, J. J. Bell, George MacDonald, Gabriel Setoun, Robina F. Hardy and, S. R. Crockett. His criticism of these writers was published in the April 1895 issue of The New Review. His A Literary History of Scotland (1903) was regarded for many years of the early 20th century as the standard work on Scottish literature. His father was Lord Craighall, a notable senator of the College of Justice in Scotland. In his youth he was schooled at the Edinburgh Academy and went to Balliol College at the University of Oxford. He took up a career in law, being called in 1889 to the Scottish Bar. He subsequently lectured and then became of Professor of Constitutional Law and Constitutional History in 1909 at the University of Edinburgh. He held this post until he retired in 1925. Over the period 1895 and 1917 he made many contributions to the Blackwood's Magazine. Among these contributions was an anonymous contribution "The Works of Mr Kipling" (Blackwood's Magazine CLXIV 1898 October pp. 470–482, With the authorship confirmed by Blackwood's Contributors' Book in the Natinonal Library of Scotland (for this ref see Green, R. L. (2013) p196 ) which was to become an influential assessment of Kipling's work.

== Selected publications ==
- Millar, J. H. (1893). A Handbook of Prescription According to the Law of Scotland. W. Green and Sons.
- Millar, J. H. (1895). The Literature of the kailyard. The New Review, 12(71), 384–394.
- Millar, J. H. (1902). The mid-eighteenth century (Vol. 9). W. Blackwood and sons.
- Millar, J. H. (1903). A Literary History of Scotland. TF Unwin.
