= Clifton Johnson bibliography =

Clifton Johnson
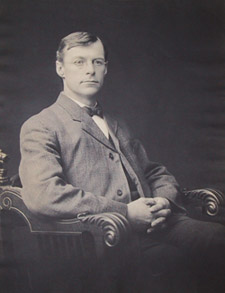
- Clifton Johnson, circa 1900

This is a list of works by Clifton Johnson, American author, illustrator, and photographer. The works are divided into sections based on Johnson's role in publication.

== Author and illustrator ==
Year	Title	Publisher	Note
1890	Picturesque Hampshire	Wade, Warner	Author in part. Edited by C.F. Warner
1891	Picturesque Franklin	Wade, Warner	Author in part. Edited by C.F. Warner
1892	Picturesque Hampden East	W. F. Adams	2 volumes. Author in part
1892	Picturesque Hampden West	W. F. Adams	2 volumes. Author in part
1893	New England Country	Lee & Shepard	Reprinted by Lee & Shepard in 1894, 1896, 1897, and 1898
1893	The Country School in New England	D. Appleton & Company	
1893	Picturesque Berkshire North	The W.F. Adams Co.	2 volumes. Author in part. Edited by C. F. Warner
1893	Picturesque Berkshire South	The W.F. Adams Co.	2 volumes. Author in part. Edited by C. F. Warner
1893	The Seasons	Bryant Press	
1894	The Farmer's Boy	D. Appleton & Company	
1896	What They Say in New England	Lee & Shepard	Reprinted by Columbia University Press with an introduction by Carl Withers in 1963
1897	The Book of Country Clouds and Sunshine	Lee & Shepard	
1897	An Unredeemed Captive	Griffith, Axtell, and Cady	
1899	Among English Hedgerows	Macmillan Publishers	Reprinted by Chautauqua Press with an introduction by Hamilton W. Mabie in 1914, and by Macmillan in 1925
1900	Along French Byways	Macmillan Publishers	
1901	The Isle of Shamrock	Macmillan Publishers	
1902	New England and its Neighbors	Macmillan Publishers	Reprinted by Macmillan in 1912
1903	The Land of Heather	Macmillan Publishers	
1904	Old-Time Schools and School-Books	Macmillan Publishers	Reprinted by Macmillan in 1917, by Peter Smith in 1935, by Columbia University Press with an introduction by Carl Withers in 1963, and by Westphalia Press with an introduction by Rahima Schwenkbeck in 2014
1904	Highways and Byways of the South	Macmillan Publishers	Reprinted in 1905 by Macmillan
1906	Highways and Byways of the Mississippi Valley	Macmillan Publishers	
1906	Highways and Byways of the Rocky Mountains	Macmillan Publishers	Reprinted by Macmillan in 1910
1907	The Farmer's Boy	Thomas Y. Crowell Co.	Revised edition
1907	The Country School	Thomas Y. Crowell Co.	Revised edition
1908	The Highways and Byways of the Pacific Coast	Macmillan Publishers	Reprinted by Macmillan in 1913
1909	The Picturesque Hudson	Macmillan Publishers	
1910	The Picturesque St. Lawrence	Macmillan Publishers	
1911	Highways and Byways of the Great Lakes	Macmillan Publishers	
1913	Highways and Byways from the St. Lawrence to Virginia	Macmillan Publishers	
1915	Highways and Byways of New England	Macmillan Publishers	Reprinted by Macmillan in 1921
1915	Highways and Byways of California	Macmillan Publishers	Reprint, with a new title page, of Highways and Byways of the Pacific Coast, 1908. Reprinted by Macmillan in 1926
1917	New England: A Human Interest Geographical Reader	Macmillan Publishers	
1918	Highways and Byways of Florida	Macmillan Publishers	
1919	What to See in America	Macmillan Publishers	Reprinted by Macmillan in 1920
1922	John Burroughs Talks	Houghton Mifflin	Biography of John Burroughs
1932	Historic Hampshire in the Connecticut Valley	Milton Bradley	
1936	Hampden County 1636-1936	American Historical Society	3 volumes

== Illustrator ==
Year	Title	Publisher	Note
1891	Wonderful deeds and doings of little giant Boab and his talking raven Tabib	Lee & Shepard	By Ingersoll Lockwood
1892	Little Captain Doppelkop	Lee & Shepard	By Ingersoll Lockwood
1895	The Natural History of Selborne	D. Appleton & Company	By Gilbert White. 2 volumes
1896	A Year in the Fields	Houghton Mifflin	by John Burroughs
1896	A Window in Thrums	Dodd, Mead & Co.	by J. M. Barrie
1896	Beside the Bonnie Brier Bush	Dodd, Mead & Co.	by Ian Maclaren
1896	The Days of Auld Lang Syne	Dodd, Mead & Co.	by Ian Maclaren
1897	Irish Idylls	Dodd, Mead & Co.	By Jane Barlow. Reprinted by Dodd, Mead & Co. in 1917
1897	Being a Boy	Houghton Mifflin	By Charles Dudley Warner. Reprinted by Houghton Mifflin in 1905
1898	A Child's History of England	Houghton Mifflin	by Charles Dickens
1900	Lorna Doone	Harper & Brothers, Publisher	by R. D. Blackmore
1900	Vesty of the Basins	Harper & Brothers, Publisher	by Sarah Pratt McLean Greene
1903	An English Village	Little, Brown and Company	A new edition of Wild Life in a Southern County by Richard Jefferies
1907	Old paths and legends of the New England border: Connecticut, Deerfield, Berkshire	G.P. Putnam's Sons	by Katherine Mixer Abbott. Johnson contributed two illustrations
1908	Cape Cod	Thomas Y. Crowell, Co.	by Henry David Thoreau
1909	The Maine Woods	Thomas Y. Crowell, Co.	by Henry David Thoreau
1910	Walden	Thomas Y. Crowell, Co.	by Henry David Thoreau
1910	In the Catskills	Houghton Mifflin	by John Burroughs
1911	A Week on the Concord and Merrimack Rivers	Thomas Y. Crowell, Co.	by Henry David Thoreau
1912	Stories of the Hudson	Dodge Publishing Company	by Washington Irving
1913	Excursions	Thomas. Y Crowell Co.	by Henry David Thoreau
1917	Years of My Youth	Harper & Brothers, Publisher	by William Dean Howells

== Editor ==
Year	Title	Publisher	Note
1899	The Ingenious Gentleman Don Quixote of La Mancha	Macmillan Publishers	By Miguel de Cervantes
1903	A boy on a farm: at work and at play	American Book Company	by Jacob Abbott
1904	The Life and Adventures of Robinson Crusoe	Macmillan Publishers	By Daniel Defoe. Reprinted by Little, Brown and Company in 1925
1904	Gulliver's Travels	Macmillan Publishers	by Jonathan Swift. Reprinted by Doubleday Page & Company in 1912
1904	Arabian Nights' Entertainments	Macmillan Publishers	Reprinted by Baker and Taylor in 1910
1905	The Oak-Tree Fairy Book	Little, Brown and Company	Reprinted by Little, Brown and Company in 1913
1905	Waste Not, Want Not Stories	American Book Company	by Maria Edgeworth
1906	The Birch-Tree Fairy Book	Little, Brown and Company	Illustrated by Willard Bonte
1907	The Tale of a Black Cat	Dodge Publishing Company	
1907	The Story of Two Boys	American Book Company	by Thomas Day. Originally published as The History of Sandford and Merton
1908	The Elm-Tree Fairy Book	Little, Brown and Company	Republished by Little, Brown and Company in 1917 and in 1919
1908	Songs Everyone Should Know	American Book Company	
1910	Narrative Bible for Young People	Baker and Taylor	
1911	Mother Goose Rhymes	Baker and Taylor	
1911	Little Folks Books of Verse	Baker and Taylor	
1912	The Fir-Tree Fairy Book	Little, Brown and Company	
1912	Artemus Ward's Best Stories	Harper & Brothers, Publisher	with an introduction by W. D. Howells; illustrated by Frank A. Nankivell
1913	Fairy-Tale Bears	Houghton Mifflin	
1913	Fairy-Tale Foxes	Houghton Mifflin	
1916	Canoeing in the Wilderness	Houghton Mifflin	by Henry David Thoreau. Illustrated by Will Hammell
1916	Adventures of a Country Boy's	American Book Company	by Jacob Abbott
1916	Water Babies	Macmillan Publishers	by Charles Kingsley
1916	King Arthur and the Knights of the Round Table	Macmillan Publishers	by Thomas Malory
1917	Mother Goose Rhymes My Children Love Best	Lloyd Adams Noble	same as Mother Goose Rhymes, 1911, with several pages added
1917	Poems my Children Love Best	Lloyd Adams Noble	Reprinted by Lloyd Adams Noble in 1919
1917	Bible Stories my Children Love Best	Lloyd Adams Noble	
1917	The Story of Johnny-Cake	Dodge Publishing Company	
1918	Alice in Wonderland	American Book Company	by Lewis Carroll
1919 and 1920	The Babes in the Woods	The Macaulay Company	Bedtime Wonder Tales. 15 volumes. Each book contains title story and several others. Reprinted by Cupples & Leon Company in 1924, and by Goldsmith in 1935.
1919 and 1920	Bluebeard	The Macaulay Company	Bedtime Wonder Tales. 15 volumes. Each book contains title story and several others. Reprinted by Cupples & Leon Company in 1924, and by Goldsmith in 1935.
1919 and 1920	The Brave Tin Soldier	The Macaulay Company	Bedtime Wonder Tales. 15 volumes. Each book contains title story and several others. Reprinted by Cupples & Leon Company in 1924, and by Goldsmith in 1935.
1919 and 1920	Cinderella	The Macaulay Company	Bedtime Wonder Tales. 15 volumes. Each book contains title story and several others. Reprinted by Cupples & Leon Company in 1924, and by Goldsmith in 1935.
1919 and 1920	The Fox and the Little Red Hen	The Macaulay Company	Bedtime Wonder Tales. 15 volumes. Each book contains title story and several others. Reprinted by Cupples & Leon Company in 1924, and by Goldsmith in 1935.
1919 and 1920	Golden Hair and the Three Bears	The Macaulay Company	Bedtime Wonder Tales. 15 volumes. Each book contains title story and several others. Reprinted by Cupples & Leon Company in 1924, and by Goldsmith in 1935.
1919 and 1920	Hop-o'-my-thumb	The Macaulay Company	Bedtime Wonder Tales. 15 volumes. Each book contains title story and several others. Reprinted by Cupples & Leon Company in 1924, and by Goldsmith in 1935.
1919 and 1920	Jack and the Beanstalk	The Macaulay Company	Bedtime Wonder Tales. 15 volumes. Each book contains title story and several others. Reprinted by Cupples & Leon Company in 1924, and by Goldsmith in 1935.
1919 and 1920	Little Red Riding Hood	The Macaulay Company	Bedtime Wonder Tales. 15 volumes. Each book contains title story and several others. Reprinted by Cupples & Leon Company in 1924, and by Goldsmith in 1935.
1919 and 1920	The Pied Piper	The Macaulay Company	Bedtime Wonder Tales. 15 volumes. Each book contains title story and several others. Reprinted by Cupples & Leon Company in 1924, and by Goldsmith in 1935.
1919 and 1920	Puss in Boots	The Macaulay Company	Bedtime Wonder Tales. 15 volumes. Each book contains title story and several others. Reprinted by Cupples & Leon Company in 1924, and by Goldsmith in 1935.
1919 and 1920	St. George and the Dragon	The Macaulay Company	Bedtime Wonder Tales. 15 volumes. Each book contains title story and several others. Reprinted by Cupples & Leon Company in 1924, and by Goldsmith in 1935.
1919 and 1920	The Sleeping Beauty	The Macaulay Company	Bedtime Wonder Tales. 15 volumes. Each book contains title story and several others. Reprinted by Cupples & Leon Company in 1924, and by Goldsmith in 1935.
1919 and 1920	The Story of Chicken-Licken	The Macaulay Company	Bedtime Wonder Tales. 15 volumes. Each book contains title story and several others. Reprinted by Cupples & Leon Company in 1924, and by Goldsmith in 1935.
1919 and 1920	Tom Thumb	The Macaulay Company	Bedtime Wonder Tales. 15 volumes. Each book contains title story and several others. Reprinted by Cupples & Leon Company in 1924, and by Goldsmith in 1935.
1921	Fairy Tales Every Child Should Know	Milton Bradley	Published under pseudonym of Anna Tweed
1924	Reynard the Fox	Milton Bradley	

== Editor and Illustrator ==
Year	Title	Publisher	Note
1897	The District School as It Was	Lee & Shepard	by Warren Burton
1909	Historic Hadley: A Quarter Centennial Souvenir	F.A. Bassette	Souvenir Publishing Co.
1909	Old Hadley Quarter Millennial Celebration		
1909	Katahdin and Chesuncook	Thomas Y. Crowell	by Henry David Thoreau
1928	The District School As It Was	Thomas Y. Crowell	

== Author ==
Year	Title	Publisher	Note
1909	The Fair Story Book	Transcript Publishing Co. Holyoke, Mass.	Edited by Mrs. William G. Dwight. Johnson contributed one chapter
1911	Studies of Famous Statesmen and Other Essays		by William Whiting. Johnson authored two chapters
1915	Battleground adventures, the stories of dwellers on the scenes of conflict in some of the most notable battles of the civil war, collected in personal interviews	Houghton Mifflin. Illustrated by Rodney Thomson	
1924	Hudson Maxim, Reminiscences and Comments, as Reported by Clifton Johnson	Doubleday Page & Company	
1927	The Parson's Devil: The Life of George M. Stearns	Johnson's Bookstore	Illustrated by Peter Newell
1927	The Rise of an American Inventor: Hudson Maxim's Life Story	Doubleday Page & Company	Reprint of Hudson Maxim, Reminiscences and Comments, as Reported by Clifton Johnson, 1924
1936	Hampden County, 1636-1936	American Historical Society	Three-volume history and biographical encyclopedia of Greater Springfield
1938	Sailing for Gold	G.P. Putnam's Sons	
