= Brigantine Yankee =

Coordinates: 21.2009°S 159.7736°W

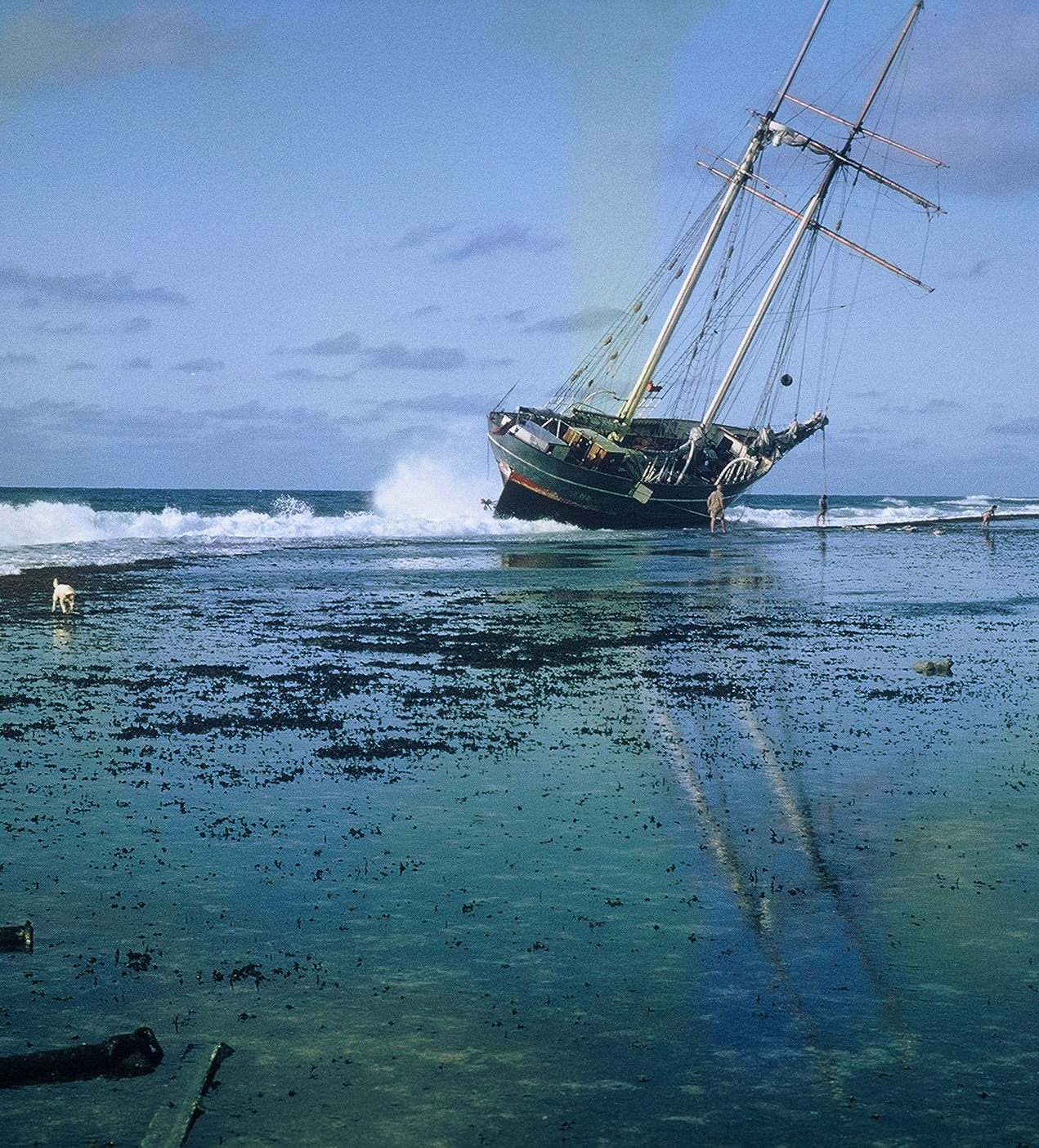
- Brigantine Yankee abandoned on the reef at Avarua, Rarotonga

History

Germany
- Name: Emden
- Builder: Nordseewerke, Emden, Germany
- Renamed: Duhnen, 1919
- Captured: May 1945, at Schleswig by Royal Air Force

United States
- Name: Yankee
- Builder: Converted at Brixham yards
- Fate: Aground on a reef in Avarua, Rarotonga, 23 July 1964

General characteristics
- Class & type: Gaff rigged schooner (as built)
- Tons burthen: c. 260 t
- Length: 96 ft (29.3 m) (overall); 81 ft (24.7 m) (waterline)
- Beam: 21.5 ft (6.6 m)
- Draft: 11 ft (3.4 m)
- Propulsion: 7,775 square feet of sail; Auxiliary Diesel
- Sail plan: Brigantine

The brigantine Yankee was a steel hulled schooner, originally constructed by Nordseewerke, Emden, Germany as the Emden, renamed Duhnen, 1919. As Yankee, it became famous as the ship that was used by Irving Johnson and Exy Johnson to circumnavigate the globe four times in eleven years. She appeared on the cover of National Geographic in December 1959.

== Duhnen ==
The Duhnen, built in 1911, was the last schooner the Germans built before the construction of steam powered ships. It was used first as a North Sea pilot vessel, taking pilots out to ships heading for Hamburg on the Elbe River (and back from those departing), and then for recreation during World War II by the Luftwaffe, and was captured by the British and used as an RAF recreation ship. The Duhnen was refitted and renamed Yankee at the Brixham yards. The new Yankee was 96 feet (29.3 m) overall, with a waterline of 81 feet (24.7 m), a maximum draft of 11 feet (3.4 m). The rig was changed to that of a brigantine with 7,775 square feet (722.3 m^{2}) of canvas.

== Johnsons ==
The brigantine Yankee was the second Yankee purchased by Irving Johnson and his wife, Exy (Electa). They bought it in 1946 with the help of a friend, film star Sterling Hayden. With the Johnsons, Yankee sailed the Caribbean, the northeast coast of America, and made four global circumnavigations with amateur crews on a share-expense basis. Each of these voyages was from Gloucester, Massachusetts, westward around the world via the Panama Canal and around the Cape of Good Hope and back to Gloucester, and took exactly 18 months.

The Johnsons had sailed their schooner Yankee around the world three times before World War II, so that their first trip in the brigantine was known as their Fourth World Cruise. It departed Gloucester on 2 November 1947 and returned on 1 May 1949, stopping at over one hundred mostly remote ports and islands, but also in Honolulu, Singapore, and Cape Town for the receipt of large shipments of canned food from S. S. Pierce in Boston. This voyage was described in the Johnsons' book Yankee's Wander-World.

These cruises were made on a three-year cycle, so that between each two, Yankee was on the northeast coast of America for two summers and one winter. During these winters, Capt. Johnson gave lectures on these voyages all over the country. In the summers, the Brigantine was under charter to the Girl Scout Mariners of America, taking groups of 16 scouts and four leaders on coastal voyages between Larchmont, NY, in Long Island Sound, and the Saint John River in New Brunswick, Canada.

The Johnsons' final voyage in the Yankee, made in 1956–58, was featured in the 1966 CBS/National Geographic television special, Voyage of the Brigantine Yankee. It was scored by Elmer Bernstein and narrated by Orson Welles.

The Johnsons sold the Yankee to Reed Whitney in 1958. He operated it during the summers of 1958 and 1959 in New England waters.

Sometime after that it was sold to Mike Burke of Miami Beach. Burke used the Yankee and the schooner Polynesia, on 10- to 14-day Windjammer Cruises in the Bahamas, hiring on amateur sailors.

== The last voyage of the Brigantine Yankee ==
The Brigantine Yankee lifted anchor in Nassau with complement of 26 passengers and crew on the evening of 10 February 1964 and set sail on what was to be a fourteen-month Windjammer Cruises, Inc., 'Around the World Cruise'. After stopping at San Salvador and Jamaica, and passing through the Panama Canal, the Yankee proceeded to the Galapagos Islands. On 8 April, during a stop at Floreana Island, one of the passengers (Sara "Saydee" Reiser) of the Yankee disappeared. Search parties combed the island for several days to no avail and the Ecuadoran navy was eventually called out to investigate. Her remains were not discovered until 1980. The Brigantine Yankee was held at Isla Santa Maria and her crew escorted to Guayaquil, Ecuador to be held until a formal inquest was completed. That same week, Time magazine published an article about the Yankee and her troubles, including the loss of a passenger. Captain Derek Lumbers and crew were eventually returned to the Yankee and they quickly set sail for French Polynesia on 8 May, after failing to pay a $400 levy placed on the ship by the local police. After sailing thirty-two days to the Marquesas and spending two days in port, the Yankee sailed another eight days to reach Papeete, Tahiti on 19 June. On 8 July, the Yankee set sail for Bora Bora before arriving at Rarotonga, Cook Islands in the early afternoon of 16 July.

Sometime between the evening of 23 July and the morning of 24 July, during very high winds and rough surf, one of the Yankee's anchor chains broke and the brigantine was washed aground on the reef at Avarua. The ship was ultimately abandoned on the reef. A court of inquiry regarding the fate of the Yankee was held the following day, with acknowledgments by several passengers that the entire cruise had been under-funded and the ship poorly maintained. The hull of the wreck of the Yankee could easily be seen from shore for decades after the event.

By 1995, the remains of the hull had been pushed onto the beach by successive storms and was cut up and moved to the island's dump, although pieces of hardware could still be found in the sand on the beach.

== Books ==
- Johnson, Irving; Johnson, Electa (1949). Yankee's wander world: circling the globe in the brigantine 'Yankee'. W. W. Norton.
- Johnson, Irving; Johnson, Electa; Edes, Lydia (1955). Yankee's people and places. Norton.
