= There Grows a Bonnie Brier Bush =

Scottish traditional folk song

There Grows a Bonnie Brier Bush, originally The Bonnie Brier Bush, is a traditional Scottish music folk song. It was included with expanded lyrics in Burns' Scots Musical Museum in 1797. Ian Maclaren included part of the song lyrics in the preface to his bestselling collection of stories set in Scotland, Beside the Bonnie Brier Bush (1894). A series of theatrical versions and the 1921 film The Bonnie Brier Bush followed.

The song notes the country kailyard (kale yard).
