= Clifton Johnson (author) =

American writer (1865-1940)

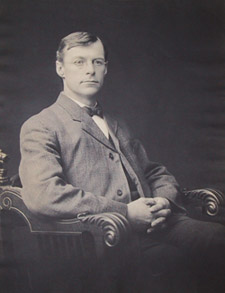
- Clifton Johnson, circa 1900
- Born: January 25, 1865; Hockanum, Hadley, Massachusetts, US
- Died: January 22, 1940 (aged 74); Brattleboro, Vermont, US
- Resting place: Hockanum Cemetery
- Occupations: author, photographer, folklorist
- Spouse: Anna Tweed McQueston (m. 1896)
- Children: 6 including Irving
- Relatives: Alan Kay (grandson) Arthur V. Johnson (second cousin)

Signature
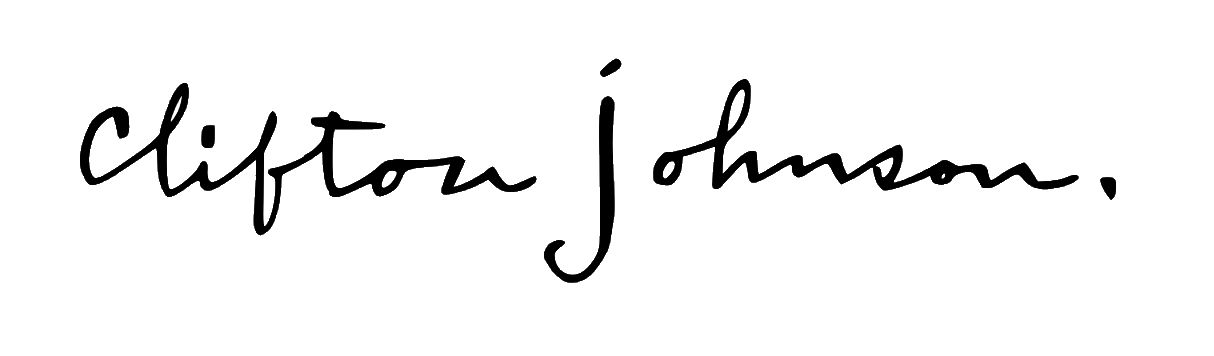

Clifton Johnson (January 25, 1865 – January 22, 1940) was an American author, illustrator, and photographer. He published some 125 books in many genres including travel books, children's stories, and biographies, many with his own illustrations and photographs.

== Early life and marriage ==
Clifton Johnson was born on January 25, 1865, in the village of Hockanum in Hadley, Massachusetts. He was the oldest child of Chester Lorenzo Johnson and Jeanette (née Reynolds) and had three siblings: two brothers, Charles (b. 1867) and Henry R. (b. 1868), and one sister, Jeanette L., known as Nettie (b.1872). He attended a local, one room schoolhouse, and then, the Hopkins Academy in Hadley. He dropped out at age 15 and spent five years working at the Bridgman & Lyman bookstore in Northampton before moving to New York City to study at the Art Students League of New York.

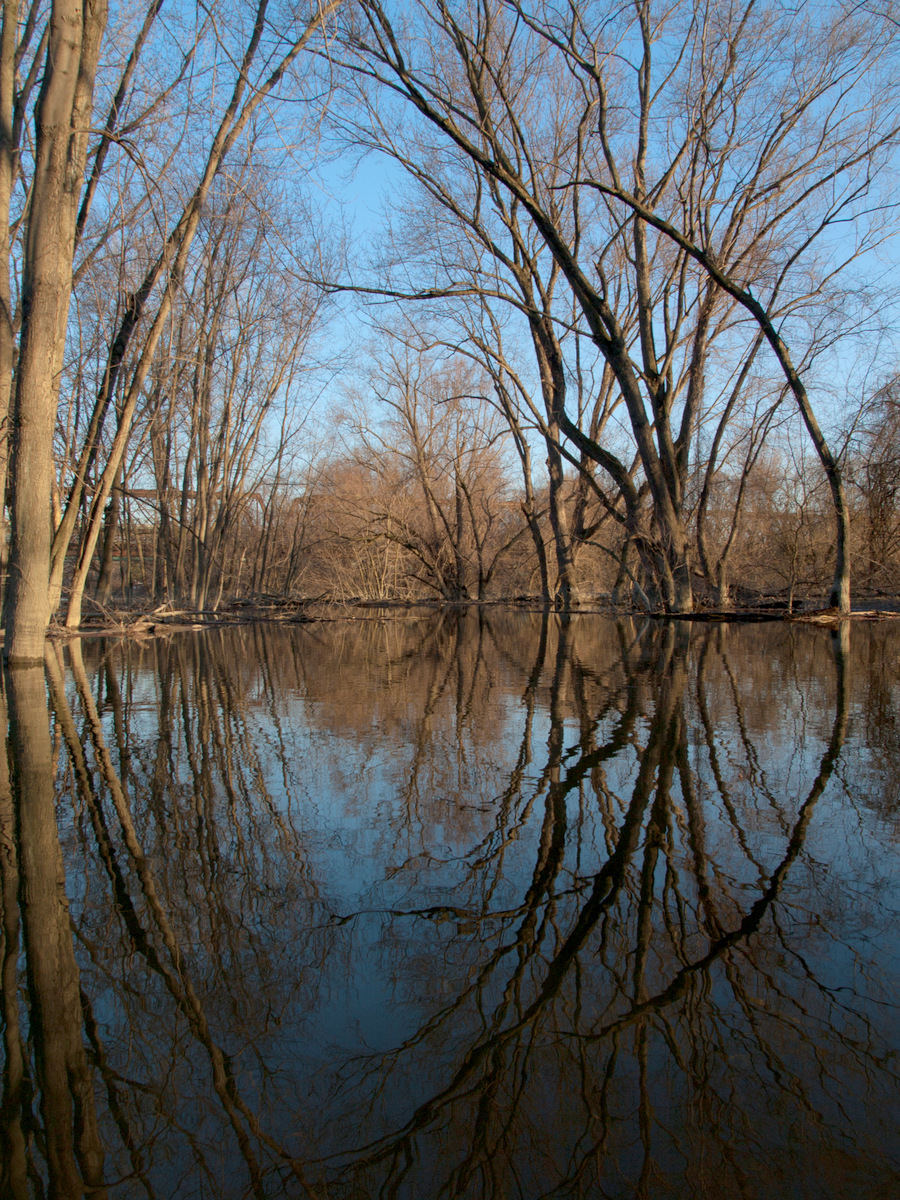
Connecticut River in Hadley

The Johnson family farm was located on the shore of the Connecticut River and, as a boy, Johnson enjoyed all that the river offered; boating, fishing, bathing, and skating in winter. Along with other boys, he enjoyed freeing logs that were caught in the river's curving shores after they were sent down-current from Canadian forests. During his early life, he barely traveled outside of Hockanum which "was hardly big enough to deserve the name ‘village,’" and he only traveled as far as Holyoke or Northampton to peddle berries. He was a self-described "hoodlum" and along with his friends "[w]e just delighted to steal apples, watermelons, and everything else." As a student, he disliked mathematics and classics preferring history and natural science, especially botany for which he had a great passion and allowed him to be outdoors.

He married Anna Tweed McQueston, a local school teacher, on May 25, 1896, and went on a honeymoon (which doubled as a work trip for Clifton) to England, Scotland, Ireland, and France. The couple had six children: Margaret (b. 1898), Arthur (b. 1900), Roger (b. 1901), Irving (b. 1905), later a sailor and captain of the "Charmian" as well as his own three ships all named Yankee, on which he and his wife Electa circumnavigated the world seven times, Katherine (b. 1911), and Oliver (December 15, 1902 – March 10, 1903) who died in infancy.

== Career ==
Even though he received little formal education, Johnson became an accomplished author, photographer, artist, editor, and folklorist. The anthropologist Carl Withers considered him a "skillful and often graceful writer, and … a foremost pioneer photographer of folk life … He was gifted to extraordinary degree with a ‘listener's ear.’ Johnson's involvement with folklore, as collector and reporter and as editor of folktale collections for children, is that of a social anthropologist interested in American folkways and folklore."

His first commission, to illustrate Wonderful deeds and doings of little giant Boab and his talking raven Tabib, a children’s book by Ingersoll Lockwood, came in 1890, followed by Little Captain Doppelkop by the same author a year later. Also starting in 1890, an ambitious project by the Northampton, MA based Wade, Warner and Co. Publishers asked Johnson to supply photographs for Picturesque Hampshire, to which he contributed hundreds of photographs and drawings. Five volumes followed in the series. The 1890s were also filled with books about country life in New England, a topic close to Johnson's heart and in which he was immersed all his life. The New England Country (1892) was successful enough to bring commissions from different publishers which resulted in The Farmer's Boy (1894), The Country School in New England (1895), and What They Say in New England (1896). His Old-time Schools and School-books (1904) was a scholarly study of early educational methods and materials based on examination of many early textbooks and especially Puritan Massachusetts. Writing in 1999, Martin Brückner referred to it as "old but still useful" when "a more detailed publishing history of geographic literature circulating in the early republic" was required.

His first few books prompted publishers to send Johnson on trips to England, Scotland, and Ireland to take photographs for reissues of classic popular books by the likes of J. M. Barrie, Jane Barlow, Richard Jefferies and Ian Maclaren. On his second trip in 1896, he also visited France. He returned with hundreds of photographs, drawings, and notebooks filled with impressions, and, with the exception of France, folklore he gathered from the locals. From these he produced books about each country: Among English Hedgerows (1899), Along French Byways (1900), The Isle of the Shamrock (1901), An English Village (1903) and The Land of Heather (1903) as well as magazine articles. A special emphasis in the English books is put on children, their games, festivals, and everyday activities.

== Writing ==
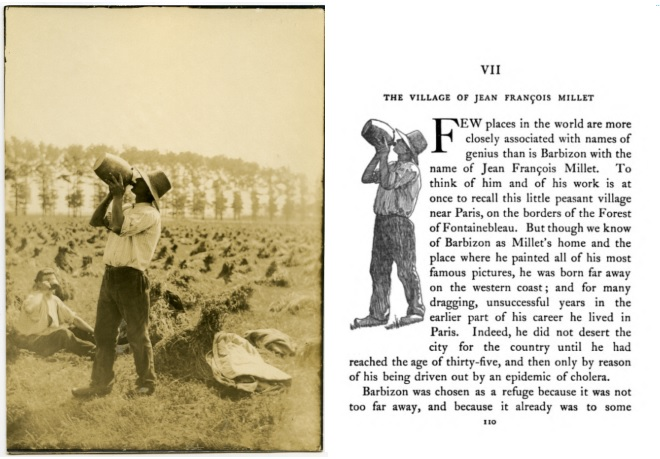
A photograph of a man drinking out of a jug with a corresponding illustration in Along French Byways, 1900.

Clifton Johnson had an interest for everyday life of people in the countryside and did oral history before the term existed. He arrived at writing through photography. He wrote "to explain the pictures." Clifton Johnson published articles for the Daily Hampshire Gazette and the Springfield Republican before publishing his first book, The New England Country (1892). He wrote travel guides, children's books, and biographies. His series of travel books, Highways and Byways of America, published in the first two decades of the 20th century and covering forty-eight states focused especially on rustic life.

He preferred byways to the highways as he stated in the preface to New England and its Neighbors: "The general title of Highways and Byways, adopted for the American series, indicates very well the writer's itinerary; but, as for the highways, it is their humbler features I love best, and it is these I linger over in my pictures and descriptions. Wherever I go the characteristic and picturesque phases of the local farm environment always appeal strongly to me, and in what I have written I have tried to convey to others the same interest I have felt, and at the same time have endeavored to give a clear and truthful impression of the reality". Elsewhere he writes: “My rambling has been in the fields and woodlands, my stopping-places in the little villages and scattered farmhouses, and I write almost wholly of rustic life and nature as I saw them in my desultory journeyings.” He also wrote books on New England country life, including The Country School (1893), The Farmer's Boy (1894), What They Say in New England (1897), which Herbert Halpert described as "excellent," and New England: a Human Interest Geographical Reader (1917).

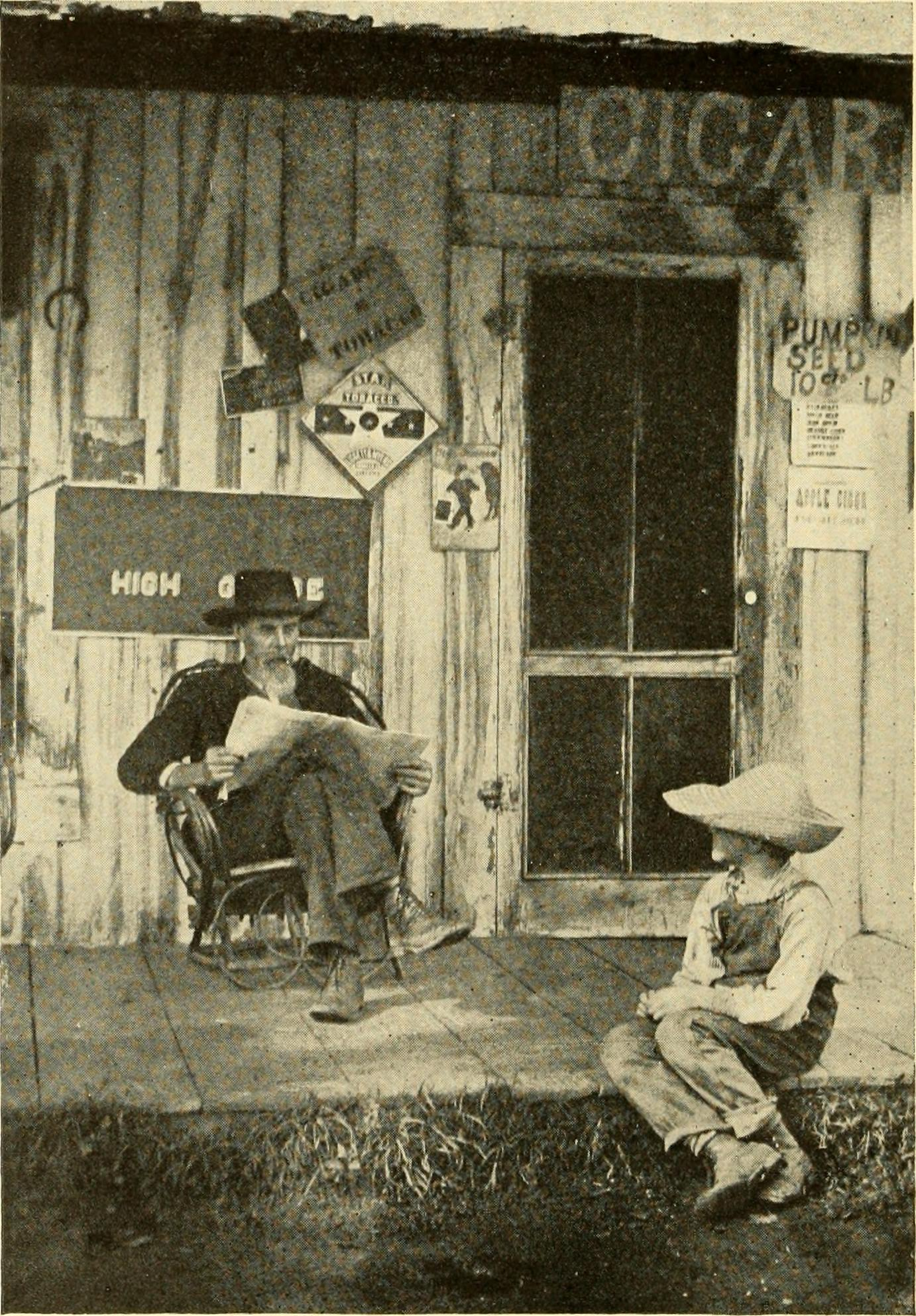
Highways and byways of the Pacific coast (1908), picture Clifton Johnson.

Referring to his writing, Johnson highlighted his approach of simply talking with people: “My method? Oh, it is all simple enough. I go out a good deal like a reporter, though I do not so proclaim myself, and talk along with the people I meet, getting friendly with them, you know, until suddenly they say something which is unusual or picturesque. Then out comes my notebook. Sometimes they ask me why I am writing down what they have said, and I tell them it is because it has interested me. Usually that suffices.”

According to Carl Withers, his travel books showed evidence of the life history method and read "like the field records of an anthropologist." He had a keen ear for details of speech patterns which he recreated in his notes, and showed great skill in suggesting differing social levels of speech and dialects. He used the same method when writing the biographies of John Burroughs, Hudson Maxim, and George M. Stearns.

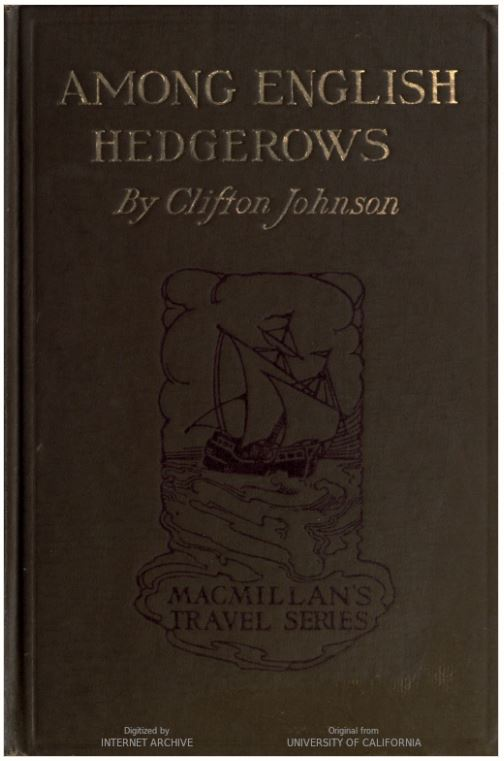
Cover of the 1912 edition

Johnson's interest in folklore and his natural ability to talk to children and create an understanding with them led to creating works in the growing and lucrative children's market. Similarly patterned to and perhaps inspired by the works by Andrew Lang, he created a series named for trees: The Oak Tree Fairy (1905), The Birch Tree Fairy Book (1906), The Elm Tree Fairy Book (1908), and The Fir Tree Fairy Book (1912). He followed these with a fifteen volume series of Bedtime Wonder Tales.

Despite their appeal as well written stories, Johnson's moralistic tales tend to reflect his own Puritan values and prevailing educational standards although he highlights the progressive system which sought to be more attractive to children rather than education by “rote and rod.” Inspired by Felix Adler's sentiment that "falsehood, gluttony, drunkenness, and evil" should not be a significant part of children's tales, Johnson edited out many cruelties. In his version of the Little Red Riding Hood, the wolf is killed by grandma with an axe and Little Red Riding Hood is not harmed. His Mother Goose Tales My Children Love Best (1917) omits some harsh sentiments and are supplanted with rhymes that seem to have come from the New England folklore. Despite these changes and differences, Carl Withers found "his versions sound more like oral, rather than literary narratives," and even though "[p]resent standards regarding anthologies and the simplification of great literature and folktales for the children's book market are different from his (but only rarely better.)"

== Photography ==
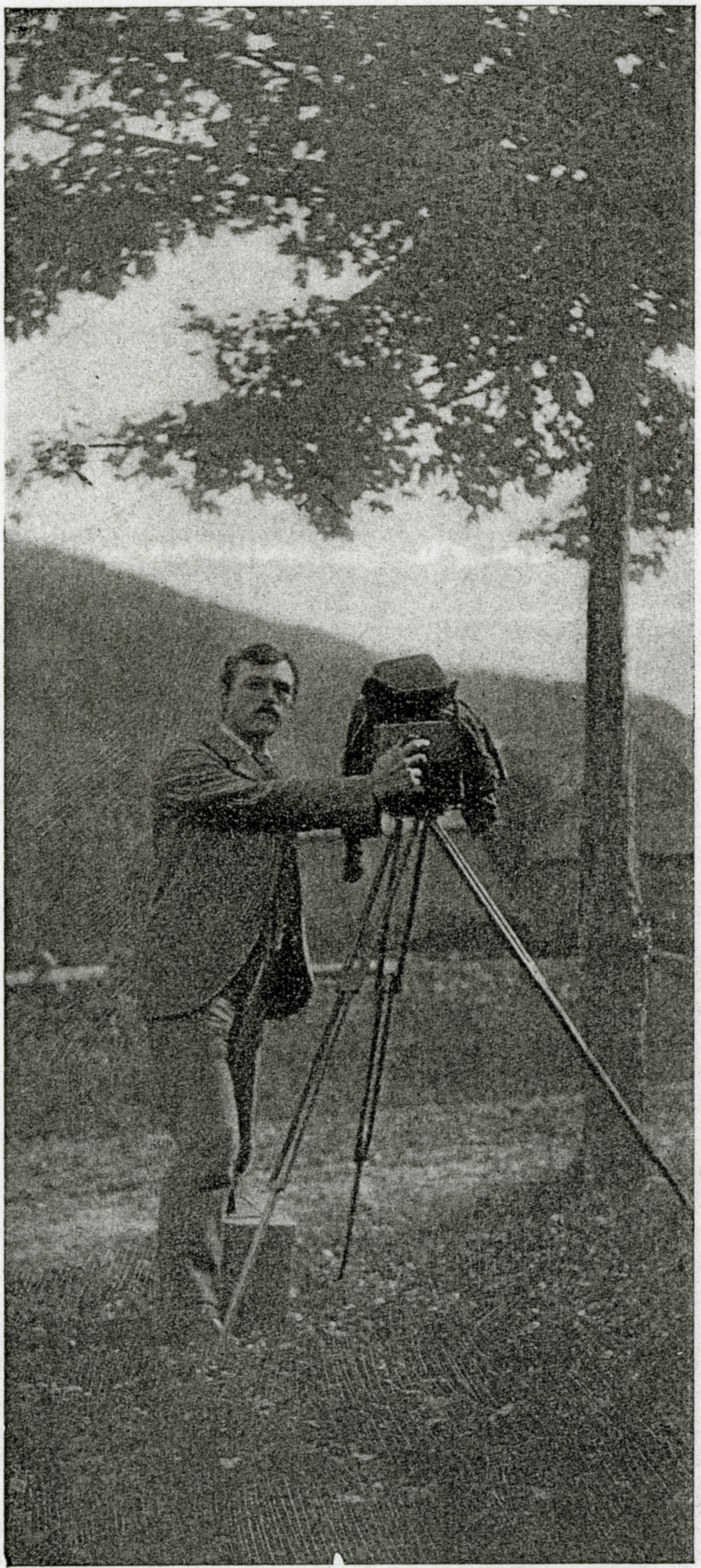
Clifton Johnson with his camera

An avid photographer, Johnson photographed life with a focus on country life and people. The focus on rustic life made his photographs especially valuable. He bought his first camera in 1888 as an aid to his drawings but after a publisher purchased his photographs, Johnson decided to focus on them as much as on drawings. He especially focused on his native Hadley and the New England states but also took photographs in the forty eight continental states as well as numerous cities and villages in France, England, Scotland, and Ireland. He illustrated a number of well-known books including Charles Dickens's Child's History of England (1898), three-volume White's Natural History of Selborne (1895), R. D. Blackmore's Lorna Doone (1900), and David Thoreau's Cape Cod (1908), Maine Woods (1909), and Walden (1910).

For Johnson, "art for art's sake" was not the supreme motive and his interest and passion in New England life, as well as folk life in general, gave his work a unity of meaning and his photographs show significant purpose as well as beauty. Instead of focusing on the unlikely, the exceptional, or surprising, his camera chose the usual, the everyday, and perhaps even the mundane which he turned into a visual poetry.

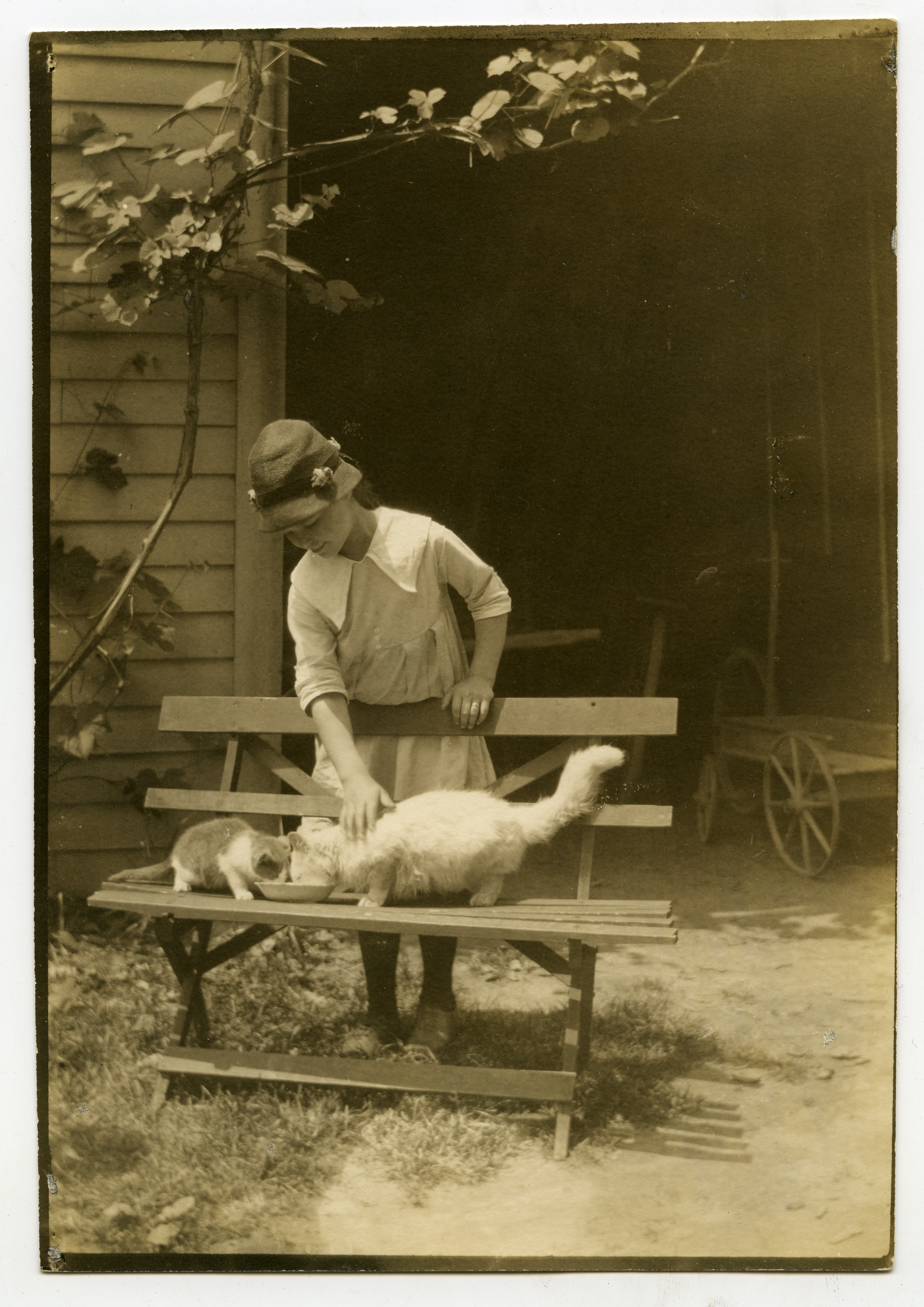
Rural life in Hadley, MA photographed by Johnson.

Johnson viewed photography in similar terms to painting and composed his photographs in that fashion. He stated that he selected subjects in the same fashion as he would for paintings and posed them in a way that represent "naturalness of life as I see it." Once the prints were developed, he would "paint on them with great care, blot out, put in, get all the art and suggestion I can into them. Sometimes I paint over almost the entire surface… if you go about it in the right way you can get at realities and the heart of things as you can by no other method."

Even though the technical shortcomings of cameras of the late 19th century required that the subjects pose for photographs, the people in Johnson's works are in their natural environment performing the same tasks as before Johnson asked them for a photograph. According to Mary Bronson Hartt, his photography was "[r]elieved by its very aims from the strain of the quest for sensation, Johnson's work is singularly restful to eyes long wearied by the monotony of surprise." His approach of foregoing studio models made his photographs "of life," not "from life," and his models were "not only alive, but living."

Johnson treated a print as a rough draft and at times retouched them by adding clouds and birds, toning down whites and heavy blacks, or even removing details or objects to make the photograph "tell its story more simply and gracefully." Because of this compositional simplicity, Johnson framed one aspect, whether a person or event in a way that easily draws the eye while the environment does not pine for supremacy bewildering the senses. Using impressionist techniques and approaches, he would use a light blur to soften the hard and dim distinctness of details like grasses or forests. In this his photographs show "not things as they are, but things as they look."

He preferred to work on hazy and misty days so as to more naturally come upon the effect of graduated blur unlike clear and sunny days which "makes his pictures unideally sharp and hard, and fills them with broken glitters of light and scattered flecks of shadow, which fritter away effect." During a misty day, mist, smoke, or even dust softened the dazzling contrasts and subdued the overall appearance of his photographs.

Johnson took photographs towards the sun, rather than away from it, because subjects lighted from behind were given "solidity and mass and the appearance of enveloping air," whereas subjects lighted from the front looked "shallow and weak and thin, and they do not separate themselves from the background."

== Tours of United States and Europe ==
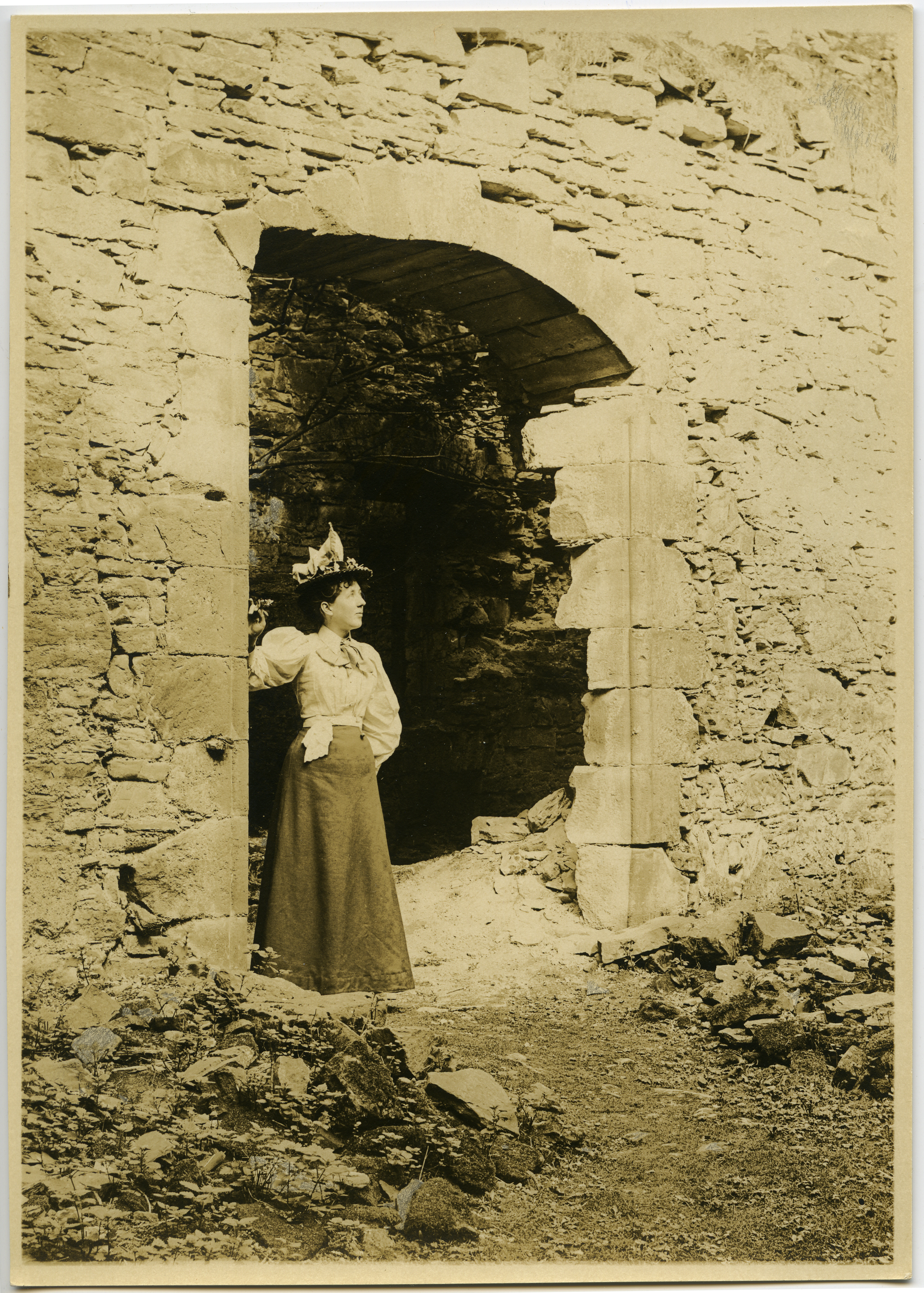
Anna McQueston Johnson standing under an arched entryway in the ruins of Logie House in Scotland.

Johnson took expansive trips across the United States and Europe to illustrate and photograph each geographical area for commissioned works and his own books. In 1895, D. Appleton and Company sent him to England to illustrate a new edition of White's Natural History of Selborne, followed by an 1896 trip commissioned by Dodd, Mead and Company to illustrate Ian Maclaren's Bonnie Brier Bush (1896) and ‘’The Days of Auld Lang Syne’’ (which the New York times predicted would appeal to the reading public and prove popular as gifts), as well as Barrie’s Window in Thrums (1896). On his third trip to Great Britain (1897), Johnson took photographs for an illustrated edition of Charles Dicken's Illustrated History of England (1898).

He traveled by train, stagecoach, river boat, canal barge, hired horse or even by foot. He liked to stay in small towns and Villages rather than cities and preferred to sleep in farmhouses which he felt gave him a better chance to observe habitual behavior and talk of everyday life. He disliked large cities as too cosmopolitan to be authentic and on one occasion he arrived in London with the intention of remaining there for several days but "the big town seemed so dingy and commonplace, and there was so much of crowds and noise, that I changed my mind and toward evening took a train that carried me northward."

== Johnson’s Bookstore ==
In April 1893, Henry and Clifton bought a small stationery and notion shop at 318 Main Street, Springfield, Massachusetts, owned by Miss S. I. Cooley with Clifton providing financial backing for the endeavor. The 800 square foot location was named ‘’Henry R. Johnson's Blank Books.’’ Henry was Clifton's younger brother and dropped out of Hopkins Academy to take the ferry to Northampton and work at College Bookstore to help pay off the family mortgage in 1885. The two and a half-year apprenticeship was followed by five and a half years working at James D. Gill's book, stationery and art store in Springfield.

Clifton designed the store's logo, a shallop, a type of boat that operated on the Connecticut River by early settlers that moved north from Wethersfield, Connecticut. The design followed the store as it relocated to ever larger locations several times and served as the logo of the store until its closure in 1998. When Johnson was not travelling, he visited the store every Tuesday and Friday and even though Henry was the owner, the two were close and Clifton served as an advisor and silent partner. Clifton sponsored art exhibits featuring many artists. Edward Walton who managed the art supplies department co-maintained the gallery. Johnson's two sons, Arthur and Roger bought the store from Henry in 1922 becoming the first members of the second generation to own the store which remained in the family until its closure in 1998.

== Philanthropic work and community involvement ==
Johnson donated time and money to a number of local endeavors. Beside sitting on the school committee and writing an account of the local one-room schoolhouse (The Country School, 1895), he published a book on the history of his town, Historic Hadley: quarter millennial souvenir, 1659–1909 (1909) and made numerous donations to the local First Congregational church including a $10,000 (well in excess of $100,000 in 2018) donation he made for the church's renovations without mentioning the gift to his family.

Clifton and Henry collaborated to open a farm museum in 1930 after Henry's collection of farm-related antiques outgrew his house, garage, and Clifton's barn spaces. The two brothers wanted to showcase items significant to labor in the fields. Dr. James Huntington of Boston, who spent his summers in Northern Hadley on his family's estate, offered his family's 53 x 66 ft. barn dating back to 1782 as a gift. Against the recommendations of architects and experts, instead of disassembling and reassembling the barn in its new location, the brothers moved the building as a whole over winter and spring. The building was dedicated on May 27, 1930, supposedly on the date of its raising in 1782, with ceremonies held at the meetinghouse.

== Legacy ==
Three of Johnson's photographs from Highways and Byways of the South (1902) inspired poet Natasha Trethewey to write "Three Photographs," a poem about each of the photographs and each written from a different point of view: Daybook, April 1901 from the photographer's, Cabbage Vendor from the subject's, and Wash Women, from the poet's own. Trethewey was “overwhelmed by their—the subject, the black people’s—gaze that comes out of those photographs though time to look at me." She felt "compelled and responsible to speak about the connection that I have with them." Johnson's photograph Barred Door; Rocky Hill Meeting House, c. 1910 was featured in American photography, 1890–1965, an exhibit by the Museum of Modern Art in New York which also toured Europe in 1995–1997.
