= Kailyard school =

Purported literary movement of Scottish fiction

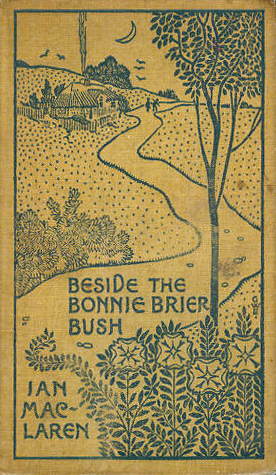
The 1894 work Beside the Bonnie Brier Bush is the archetypical example: a hugely popular bestseller depicting rural Scottish life

The Kailyard school is a purported literary movement of Scottish fiction; referring to certain works which were published and were most popular roughly from 1880–1914. The term originated from literary critics who mostly disparaged the works said to be within the school; it was not a term of self-identification used by authors alleged to be within it. According to these critics, kailyard literature depicted an idealised version of rural Scottish life, and was typically unchallenging and sentimental.

== Origin and etymology ==
The "Kailyard school" was first given that name in an article published April 1895 in the New Review by J.H. Millar, though its editor William Ernest Henley was heavily implicated to have created the term. The term was meant as a criticism that a certain group of Scottish authors offered an overly sentimental and idyllic representation of rural life, but it was potentially more a gripe against the popularity of the authors. The name derives from the Scots "kailyaird" or "kailyard", which means a small cabbage patch or kitchen garden, usually adjacent to a cottage; but more famously from Ian Maclaren's 1894 book Beside the Bonnie Brier Bush whose title alludes to the Jacobite song "There grows a bonnie brier bush in our kailyard".

== Writers and works ==
Writers who have been linked to the Kailyard school included J. M. Barrie, Ian Maclaren, J. J. Bell, George MacDonald, Gabriel Setoun, Robina F. Hardy and S. R. Crockett.

Works such as Barrie's Auld Licht Idylls (1888), A Window in Thrums (1889), and The Little Minister (1891); and Crockett's The Stickit Minister (1893) considered examples of the so called 'school'.

Criticism came from certain branches of the English literary establishment including T. W. H. Crosland and from fellow Scots such as George Douglas Brown who aimed his 1901 novel The House with the Green Shutters explicitly against what he called "the sentimental slop" of the Kailyard school. Much of Hugh MacDiarmid's work, and the Scottish Renaissance associated with him, was a reaction against Kailyardism. Ian Carter has argued that the Kailyard school reflects a sentimental structure of feeling which has deep roots in Scottish literature and can be found in the works of Burns and Scott, and that the work of William Alexander and later Scottish Renaissance writers such as Lewis Grassic Gibbon can be seen as the assertion of a democratic structure of feeling which is in tension with it.

== Skepticism ==
Scottish literary criticism right up till the 1980s used the term. Since then, critics such as Andrew Nash have argued that it was a social construct rather than an actual literary movement.

== In literature ==
John Ashbery references the school in his book of poems, April Galleons, his protagonist lamenting mildly that "nobody I know ever talks about the Kailyard School, at least not at the dinner parties I go to".

== See also ==
- Culture of Scotland
- Tartanry
- Tom Nairn
- William Robertson Nicoll
