= Beside the Bonnie Brier Bush =

1894 book of short stories by Ian Maclaren

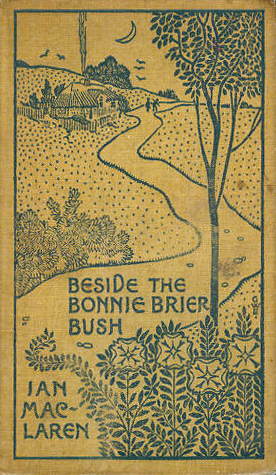
1st edition cover

Beside the Bonnie Brier Bush is a book of short stories by Ian Maclaren published in 1894. It became a hugely popular bestseller. It is considered to be part of the Kailyard School of Scottish literature. A kailyard or kailyaird (kale) is comparable to a cabbage patch and refers to a kitchen garden as might be found adjacent to a cottage. The title, Beside the Bonnie Brier Bush, references the Jacobite song "There grows a bonnie brier bush in our Kailyard". Publishers Weekly reported it as the bestselling novel in the U.S. during 1895 and the 10th bestselling novel during 1896.

The stories in the book recount some of MacLaren's experiences as a Free Church minister in rural Perthshire and blends humour and pathos with racy Scots dialogue.

Maclaren mentions the Drumtochty Forest in the book.

William Hole illustrated an 1896 Hodder & Stoughton edition of the book. In the U.S., Clifton Johnson illustrated an edition of the book as well as MacLaren's The Days of Auld Lang Syne. He also illustrated works by Scottish author J. M. Barrie.

== Legacy ==
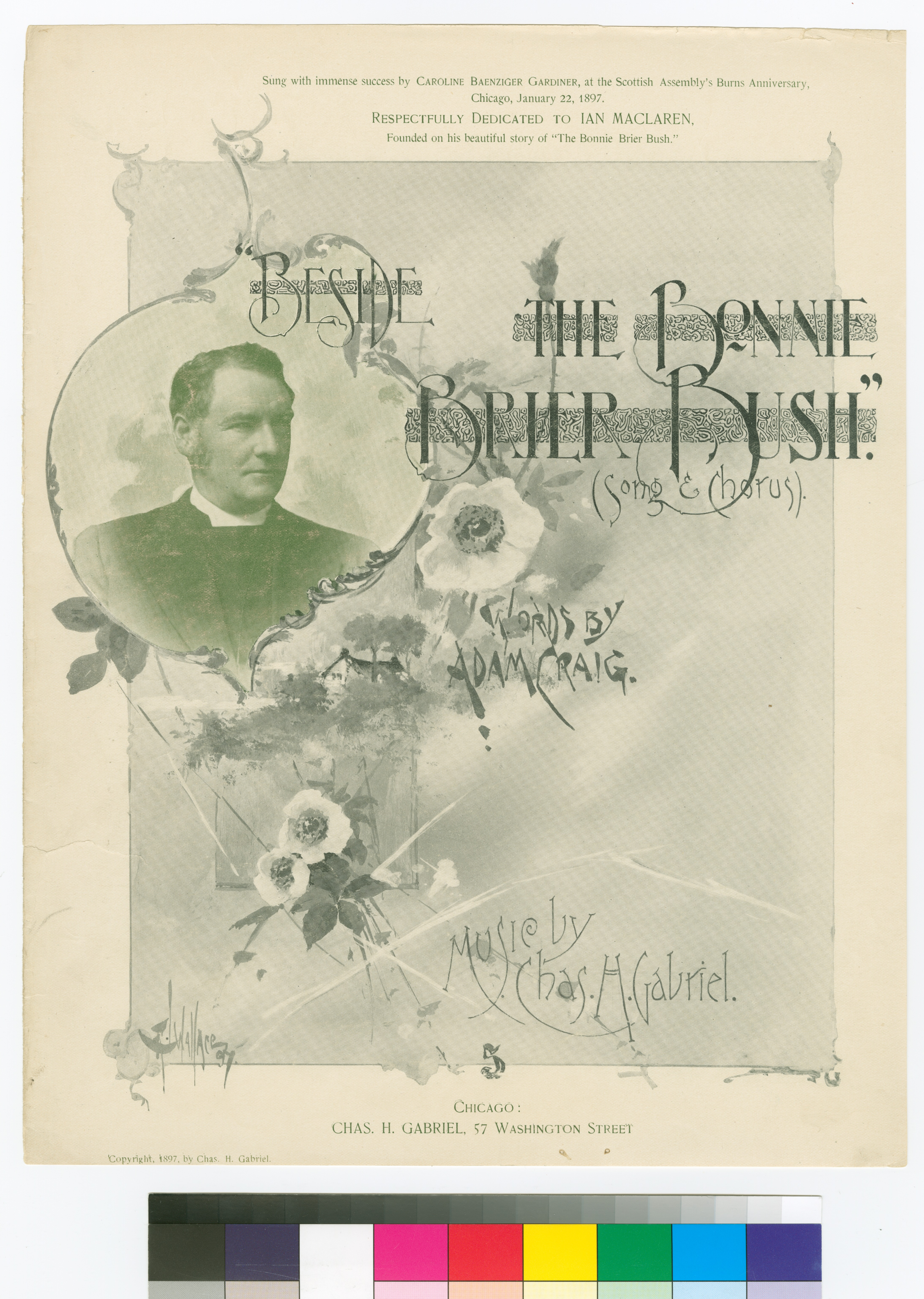

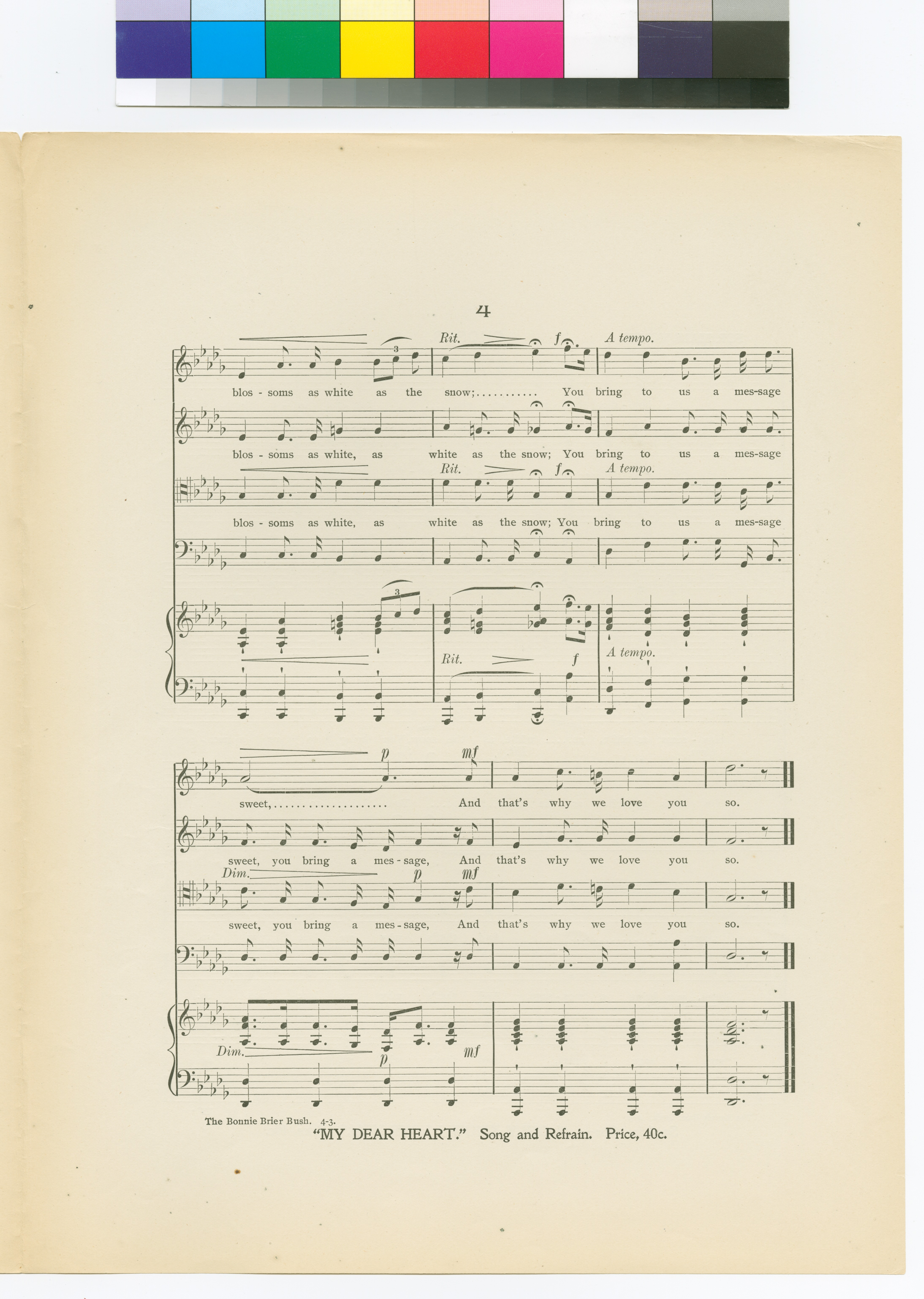
Songsheet from 1897 for Beside the Bonnie Brier Bush

Charles H. Gabriel wrote the music and produced songsheets for the song and dedicated it to Mclaren.

A series of theatrical performances were based on the bestselling book. One involved Kirke La Shelle in 1901. A 1903 play based on the book was Mabel Brownell's debut. A 1905 play included Lettice Fairfax.

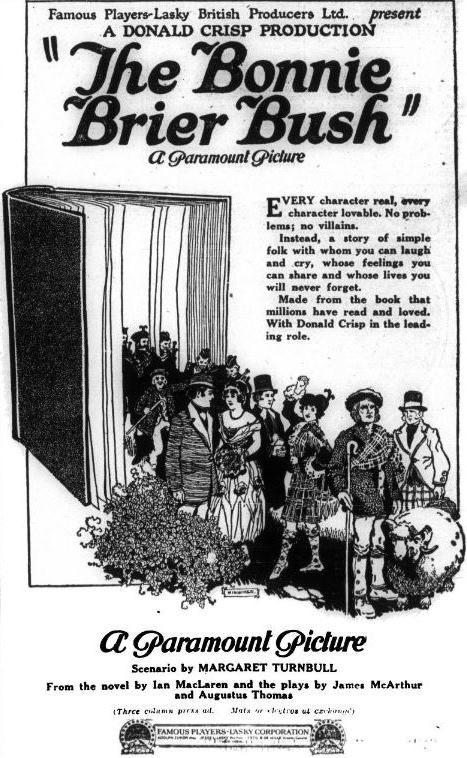
Advertisement for Donald Crisp's 1921 film The Bonnie Brier Bush

In 1921, Donald Crisp directed The Bonnie Brier Bush, a movie adaptation of the book set in Scotland. It is considered lost.

== See also ==
- Publishers Weekly list of bestselling novels in the United States in the 1890s
