= Irving Johnson (ship) =

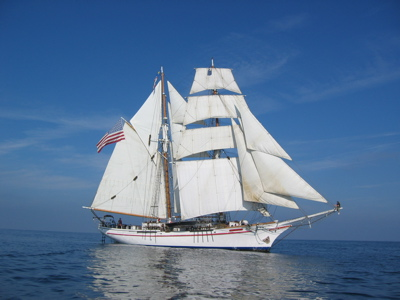

History

United States
- Name: Irving Johnson
- Owner: Los Angeles Maritime Institute
- Builder: Allan Rawl/Brigantine Boatworks
- Launched: 2002, San Pedro, CA
- Commissioned: 2003
- In service: 2003
- Home port: Los Angeles, CA
- Identification: MMSI number: 369725000; Callsign: WDB3153
- Status: Active

General characteristics
- Type: Brigantine
- Displacement: 129 t
- Length: 113 ft (34 m)
- Beam: 21 ft (6 m)
- Height: 87.6 ft (26.7 m)
- Draft: 11 ft (3 m)
- Depth of hold: n/a
- Sail plan: Brigantine; Sail Area: 5,032 sq ft (467 m^{2}). Two Masts, 13 Sails; Note: While it is customary to refer to these vessels as "brigantines" today, the classic definition of that rig would require one or more square sails on the mainmast. As rigged, these vessels would have been called "hermaphrodite schooners" in the 19th century and earlier.
- Notes: Design by: Henry Gruber/W.I.B. Crealock

The twin brigantines Irving Johnson and Exy Johnson are the flagships of the Los Angeles Maritime Institute's (LAMI) TopSail Youth Program, a non-profit organization that helps at-risk youth learn discipline and teamwork through sailing. They join LAMI's topsail schooners the Swift of Ipswich and the Bill of Rights. The boats are named for sail training pioneers Irving Johnson and his wife Electa "Exy" Johnson.

== Construction ==
The brigantines are based on original plans designed in the 1930s by Henry Gruber but never built. Noted yacht designer W.I.B. Crealock was brought in to adapt the plans to meet modern Coast Guard regulations and to fit LAMI's own specifications.

With the arrival of a truckload of South American Purpleheart hardwood for the keel in 2000, the Twin Brigantine project began in the parking lot adjacent to LAMI. The Keels for the twins was constructed from the same large tree. The hulls were built in public, and framed out with American White oak and fastened to the keel with bronze bolts. With the planking, decks, diesel engine and holding tanks installed, hall calked and painted. The Naming ceremony commenced. Launched on 27 April 2002, they were proclaimed as the "Official Tall Ship Ambassadors of the City of Los Angeles" by Mayor James Hahn and witnessed by one of their namesakes, Exy Johnson, before motoring out to a fitting-out berth in the harbor where the interiors were finished and completed as their masts stepped, rigged and sails bent on.

== Layout and facilities ==
Within its 90-foot (27 m) length on deck and 21-foot (6 m) beam the ship is divided into three cabins called "A", "B", and "C" compartments. In "A" compartment, 12 bunks, a head and enclosed shower are forward. In "B" compartment, 18 bunks, two additional heads, another shower and a large common area amidships can be found. Also amidships to port are a large refrigerator and freezer and access to the deck through the galley above.

The galley features a six-burner propane stove forward, a day fridge to port and counter space with two deep sink wells to starboard. There are ports all around, providing light and ventilation.

To aft lies the chart house with a large chart table and a wraparound settee that can be used for teaching, eating or charting. The nav station to port is readily accessible from the helm. It includes radar, GPS, VHF and SSB. Below in "C" compartment lies the master's cabin, an officer's cabin with two bunks, four crew bunks aft, a head with enclosed shower and access to the engine room below. An on-deck cockpit provides additional teaching space as well as a location for al fresco dining.

A 3208 V8 Caterpillar diesel engine provides auxiliary power producing 315 brake horsepower (235 kW) at 2600 rpm while a Northern Lights 16 kW electrical generator powers the amenities on board. Coupled with a Village Marine 50 gph water maker, it renders the ship capable of extended passages off shore.

Two-and-a-half miles of running rigging support a total of 5,032 square feet (467 m^{2}) of canvas on two masts and 13 sails, controlled by 85 lines on deck.

== Significant Voyages ==
- April-May 2003 - Maiden voyage from San Pedro to San Francisco
- January-May 2004 - 7,000 mile voyage from San Pedro Mexico, Hawaii, and San Francisco with Long Island University
- October 2006 - Voyage to San Francisco following her return to service.

== Grounding ==
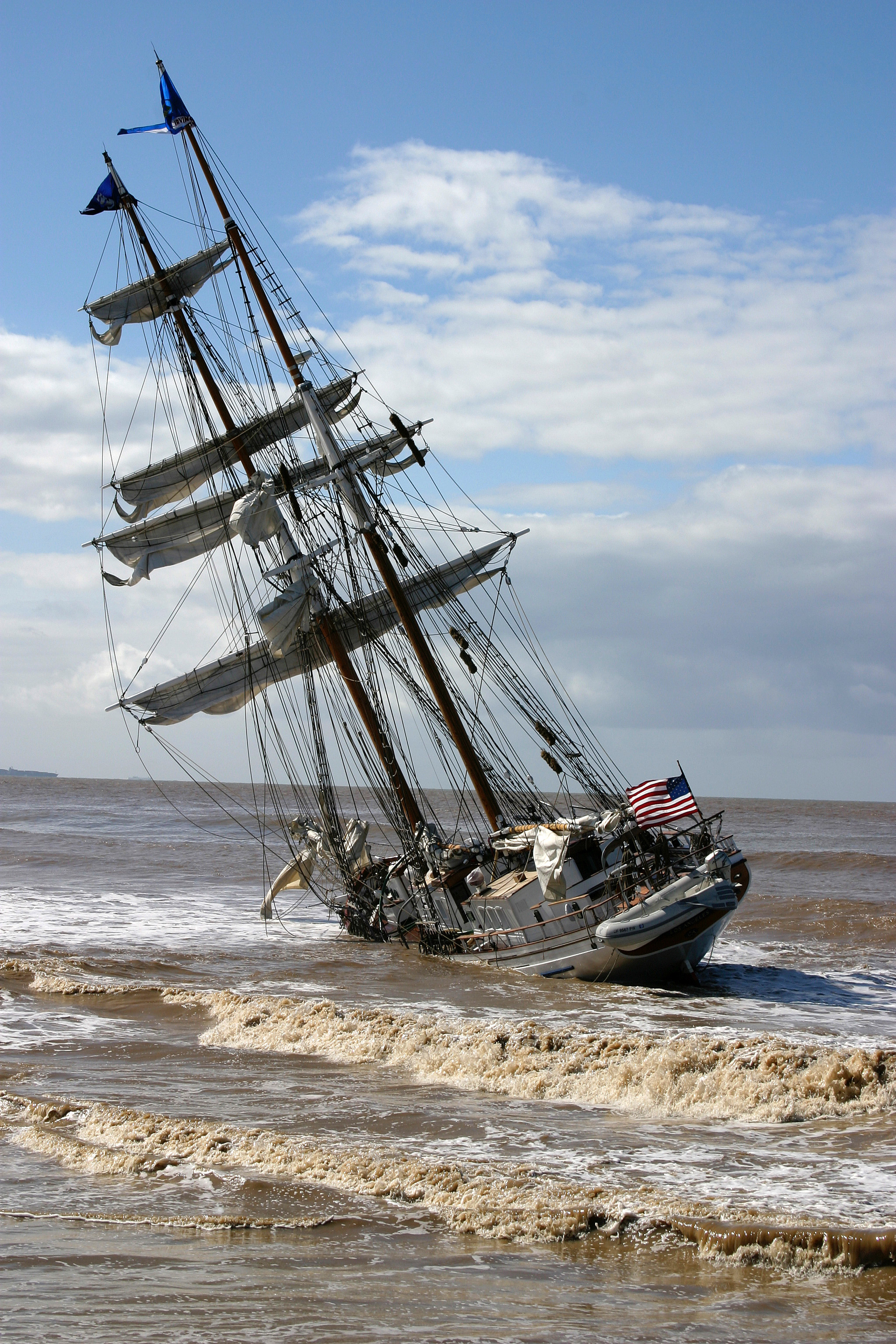
Irving Johnson aground, March 23, 2005

On March 21, 2005, Irving Johnson went aground on a sandbar outside the entrance to Channel Islands Harbor. The sandbar was the result of heavy rains, which washed debris and silt into the channel, and was thus uncharted. All crew and passengers were rescued safely, but initial attempts by the Coast Guard to tow the vessel off the bar failed and the vessel was stranded on the beach for several days before being pulled off. Suffering from serious damage which compromised the forward portion of the vessel and flooded the vessel with seawater, she underwent an extensive $2m reconstruction and was returned to service in early 2006.

== In Pop Culture ==
- Appeared in an episode of the 4th season of The Bachelor.
- The opening sequence to Sharknado was filmed on Irving Johnson.
- Irving Johnson portrayed the vessel used by the president of the United States in episode 216 of the television series Revolution.

== See also ==
- Nautical terms
- Rigging
- Tall ship
