= Irving Johnson =

American sailor (1905–1991)

Irving McClure Johnson (July 4, 1905 – January 2, 1991) was an American sail training pioneer, adventurer, lecturer and writer.

== Early life ==
Johnson was born in Hadley, Massachusetts, the fifth child of the author, illustrator, and photographer Clifton Johnson and Anna Tweed McQueston.

== Sailing ==
Johnson became a professional sailor, joining the Merchant Marine in 1926, working summers as crew and captain of various yachts including the "Charmian" for Newcomb Carlton (President of Western Union), which led to the opportunity to sail on the Peking. He was an amateur filmmaker and his footage on the barque Peking in 1929 would become the film Around Cape Horn.

While serving as mate on board the Wanderbird, Johnson met (Harriet) Electa "Exy" Search whom he married in 1932. The Johnsons circumnavigated the world seven times on two vessels, both named Yankee, each trip with a new crew and each taking approximately 18 months. The first Yankee, bought in 1933, was a Dutch North Sea pilot schooner. (Before becoming an actor, Sterling Hayden served as mate aboard the first Yankee.) The second Yankee, bought in 1947, was a retired German North Sea pilot schooner which the Johnsons rerigged as a brigantine. They then retired from circumnavigation and, in 1958–9, had the last Yankee built at Westhaven in Zaandam, the Netherlands. She was a steel ketch for sailing the inland waterways of Europe, designed by Irving Johnson and Olin Stephens of Sparkman & Stephens.

Many of the Johnsons' voyages have been documented in their own books and many articles and videos produced by the National Geographic Society and others throughout their sailing career. With an amateur crew, they traveled hundreds of thousands of miles to the islands of the South Pacific, ports of call in Southeast Asia, around the Cape of Good Hope and home to Gloucester without incident 18 months later seven times.

== World War II ==
Upon the urging of Bill Donovan, soon to be the head of the predecessor to the OSS, Johnson joined the U.S. Navy in 1941, and was at Pearl Harbor on the day of the attack. His knowledge of the South Pacific made him a natural choice to advise the Pacific Fleet on the tides, swells, currents, depths and shoals around the treacherous reefs and atolls of the South Seas. He was commissioned a Lieutenant Commander, and joined the USS Sumner, finishing the war as her commanding officer. On board they created and printed five-color charts, scouted out potential harbours for US Navy vessels, and conducted underwater demolition to improve the suitability of some of the harbours. Johnson also dove on recently sunken Japanese vessels, searching for classified Japanese documents. One success was a chart of the minefields surrounding Japanese harbors.

== Ashore ==
Johnson educated the public about the age of sail throughout his life, personally narrating showings of Around Cape Horn on board the Peking (docked at South Street Seaport in New York City from 1974 to 2016) and working with Mystic Seaport and the Sea Education Association, serving as a trustee of both until his death in 1991.

The Los Angeles Maritime Institute has honored the Johnsons by naming their twin brigantines for use in their Topsail Youth program after them, Irving Johnson and Exy Johnson.

Exy Johnson oversaw the christening ceremonies of the vessels whose construction she was instrumental in until her death in 2004.

Chris Sheldon and his wife Alice met on the Yankee, and sailed on the seventh world cruise where she served as the ship's doctor. Dr. Sheldon's experience on board the ill-fated brigantine Albatross served as the basis for the film White Squall (1996). Capt. Johnson also mentored yachtsman Jim Stoll, who became one of the directors of the Flint School.

In 1983, Commander Irving Johnson became an Honorary Member of the Explorers Club.

His nephew, Alan Kay, is an American computer scientist.

== See also ==
- Irving Johnson (ship)
- Los Angeles Maritime Institute
- Mystic Seaport
- Obituary of Exy Johnson in the Boston Globe
- Obituary of Irving Johnson in the New York Times

== Books ==
- Johnson, Irving (1932). Round the Horn in a square-rigger. M. Bradley. (reprinted as Johnson, Irving (1995). The Peking Battles Cape Horn. Ingram Pub Services. ISBN 978-0-930248-07-9.)
- Johnson, Irving (1933). Shamrock V's wild voyage home: and other sea-going adventures. Milton Bradley.
- Johnson, Irving; Johnson, Harriet Electa Search (1936). Westward bound in the schooner Yankee. W. W. Norton.
- Johnson, Irving; Johnson, Electa (1939). Sailing to see: picture cruise in the schooner Yankee. W. W. Norton.
- Johnson, Irving; Johnson, Electa (1949). Yankee's wander world: circling the globe in the brigantine 'Yankee'. W. W. Norton.
- Johnson, Irving; Johnson, Electa; Edes, Lydia (1955). Yankee's people and places. Norton.
- Johnson, Irving; Johnson, Harriet Eleca Search (1962). Yankee sails across Europe. Norton.
- Johnson, Irving; Johnson, Electa (1966). Yankee sails the Nile. Norton.

== Articles ==
- Irving Johnson; Across the Atlantic in the "Shamrock V" (Yachting, January 1931)
- Irving Johnson; Discovering Islands (Yachting, February 1935)
- Irving and Electa Johnson; Westward Bound in the Yankee (National Geographic Magazine, January 1942)
- Irving Johnson; Goodbye Pacific, Hello Maine (Yachting, November 1945)
- Irving Johnson; Adventures with the Survey Navy (National Geographic Magazine, January 1947)
- Irving Johnson; England to Gloucester (Yachting, May 1948)
- Irving and Electa Johnson; The Yankee's Wander World (National Geographic Magazine, January 1949)
- Irving and Electa Johnson. Yankee Roams the Orient (National Geographic Magazine, March 1951)
- Irving and Electa Johnson; South Seas Incredible Land Divers (National Geographic Magazine, January 1955)
- Irving and Electa Johnson; The New Yankee (Yachts and Yachting, October 10, 1958)
- Irving and Electa Johnson; Lost World of the Galapagos (National Geographic Magazine, May 1959)
- Irving and Electa Johnson; New Guinea to Bali in Yankee (National Geographic Magazine, December 1959)
- Irving Johnson; The Ketch Yankee (Yachting, August 1960)
- Irving and Electa Johnson; Inside Europe Aboard Yankee (National Geographic Magazine, August 1964)
- Irving and Electa Johnson; Yankee Cruises the Storied Nile (National Geographic Magazine, May 1965)
- Irving Johnson; Getting Unstuck (Yachting, January 1968)
- Irving and Electa Johnson; Yankee Sails Turkey's History-Haunted Coast (National Geographic Magazine, December 1969)
- Electa Johnson; Yankee Cruises Inland Italy: Part I (Yachting, July 1973)
- Electa Johnson; Yankee Cruises Inland Italy: Part II (Yachting, August 1973)

== Films ==
- Yankee Sails Across Europe (National Geographic Society, 1967)
- Voyage of the Brigantine Yankee (National Geographic Society, 1966)
- Irving Johnson: High Seas Adventurer (National Geographic Society, 1985)
- Around Cape Horn (Mystic Seaport, 1985) (from original 16 mm footage shot by Irving Johnson, 1929)
- Unfurling the World: The Voyages of Irving and Electa Johnson (Mystic Seaport, 2012)
