= Louis Vincent Aronson =

American businessman (1869–1940)

Louis V. Aronson
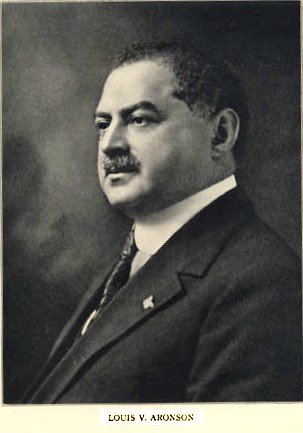
- 1915 Louis V. Aronson
- Born: New York City, U.S.
- Died: November 3, 1940 (aged 70); Long Branch, New Jersey, U.S.
- Occupation: American businessman

Louis Vincent Aronson (December 25, 1869 – November 3, 1940), was an American inventor and industrialist, known as the founder of The Art Metal Works and the inventor of Ronson lighters.

== Early life and education ==
Aronson was born in New York City on December 25, 1869. His parents were Simon and Jennie Aronson were Jewish immigrants from Prussia. Louis graduated from public school at the age of 12 before entering a New York technical school specializing in metallurgy, practical metal working and mechanical drawing. At the same time, he set up a laboratory in the basement of his parents' home where he experimented with plating processes and turned out money-making items while he devised ways of metalizing common items in a durable finish of matte gold, including flowers, butterflies, animal claws, and baby shoes.

Louis Aronson’s natural ability for designing was honed at the technical school. He completed the school’s four year academic program in three years. When he graduated in 1886, at the age of 16, he was qualified as an expert metallurgist, draftsman, and designer. He had a high level knowledge of chemistry. He returned to the school five years later becoming an instructor in metallurgy for several years before devoting all his time to his own company. When he was 24 years old, he sold the rights to a commercially valuable metal plating process for $5000 while retaining full use of his invention, and used the proceeds to open his own company named The Art Metal Works.

== Matches and lighters ==
Aronson gained public recognition when he won an award in 1893 from the Belgian government for the creation of the first non-toxic match, winning 50,000 francs ($10,000 U.S. dollars). In 1897 he received a U.S. patent for a match design (called the Wind-match) that would light in windy conditions or when wet. He continued working on his match designs including inventing the “Birds Eye” or “Kitchen” match that had a dual-tip design in 1903. This was an important safety improvement because friction matches of the day would sometimes light accidentally especially when stepped on or while in one’s pocket. He realized that placing a small friction ignition chemical on the tip instead of the entire match-head greatly limited accidental ignition. The same style of match is still in use today.

Aronson continued his research on all-weather matches and received a U.S. patent in 1918 for a match that was praised by soldiers who were fighting in mud-filled trenches during World War I. His proficiency with matches led to a U.S. patent for bomb fuses also used in World War I, which he donated to the U.S. Government for the duration of the war, earning his company the Distinguished Service Certificate from President Woodrow Wilson and the War Department.

In 1910 Aronson received his first patent for a pocket lighter which used a flint material containing a mixture of cerium and iron. His design was a simple device that created a shower of sparks with the press of a finger, but there was no sustainable flame. He later produced the Pist-O-Liter which also only produced sparks. Within three years he received a patent for a “pyrophorous lighter” which was capable of producing and sustaining a flame by means of a steel-tipped wand fitted with a cloth-wick saturated in petroleum ether. The next year, 1914, he was granted a design patent for the Bulldog striker lighter, which soon became a popular table lighter.

In 1926 Aronson released a new "automatic operation" Banjo lighter, which offered both ignition and extinguishment in a single push. It was a great success, demand shortly exceeding supply, spurring Aronson to patent it and design other products around the invention, which were marketed under the Ronson brand name.

== Other work ==
Aronson’s earlier efforts to produce igniting devices led him to invent many other useful and profitable items. His ongoing experiments sparked ideas for other successful inventions like safe children’s toys including sparking guns, spinning tops, and pinwheels in addition to a series of hand held toys with sparking eyes called Archies. The company also produced a variety of high quality lamps, book ends, statues and other decorative items prized today for their detail in the collector marketplace.

Aronson ran for mayor of Newark in 1912, was a longtime treasurer for the Essex County Republican Party, and became a bank executive. He dedicated much of his time to causes that benefited children and the under-privileged in society.

== Personal life and death ==
Aronson's first wife, Gertrude Deutsch Aronson, died in 1934. He married Mabel Brownell, a stock-company actress, in 1935. Louis died on November 2, 1940, in Long Branch, New Jersey.

== See also ==
- Ronson (company)
- Lighter
