= Ronson (company) =

Producer of lighters and lighter accessories

Ronson Consumer Products Corporation
- Current logos, owned by Zippo

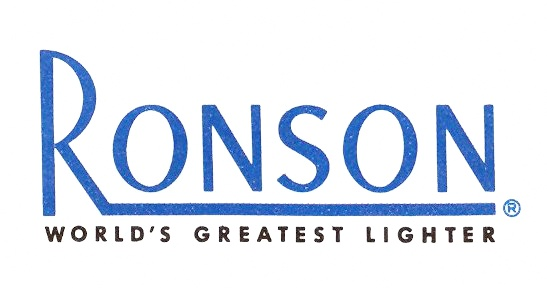
- 1954 logo
- Formerly: The Art Metal Works
- Founded: July 20, 1898; 128 years ago in Newark, New Jersey, United States
- Founders: Max Hecht, Louis V. Aronson and Leopold Herzig
- Headquarters: United States

Ronson Consumer Products Corporation was formerly based in Somerset, New Jersey. It is a producer of lighters and lighter accessories.

Zippo Manufacturing Company currently owns the related brands in the United States, Canada, and Mexico, and continues to produce Ronson lighters and Ronsonol fuel.

Ronson International Limited, located in Northampton, England, owns the Ronson brand in most other territories throughout the world.

== History ==
=== The Art Metal Works ===
1903 Art Metal Works Advertisement

The Ronson lighter company started as The Art Metal Works in 1897 and was incorporated on July 20, 1898, by Max Hecht, Louis Vincent Aronson and Leopold Herzig, in Newark, New Jersey.

Louis V. Aronson was a large creative driving force for the company; and, with a few business adjustments, including the addition of Alexander Harris (1910–11) as business manager, the company soon became world famous.

All accounts state that Louis Aronson was a gifted man, who at 16-years-old set up a money-making shop in his parents' home - before receiving a U.S. patent for a commercially valuable metal-plating process he developed when he was 24 years old, and he sold half the rights while retaining the Right to Use. "His experiments, which he has been conducting since his early youth, resulted in 1893 in the discovery of a process for electrically producing tinplate. Much money was expended upon improving the process... and has been of great practical value to the whole industry. Retaining its rights, he sold half the patent rights, and later used part of the proceeds to open the Art Metal Works in Newark, N.J. Soon the company was producing a variety of high-quality Lamps, Book ends, Art Statues and other decorative items, prized today for their detail in the collector marketplace.

==== Lamps, ink wells, hood ornaments and safety matches ====
1912 Art Metal Works Hood Ornaments Advertisement page

In the 1910s The Art Metal Works were producing very good quality Hood Ornaments and gained a reputation as a dependable supplier of same.

Aronson had established himself as a safety-match development pioneer with his inventions of the "Non-Toxic Match" and the "All-Weather Match" in the 1890s. Another invention of Mr. Aronson was the wind-match, for which he applied for a patent December 29, 1896. He found a chemical combination which ensured combustion in the highest wind, a boon to the tourist as well as to the explorer and the hunter. The patent was granted October 26, 1897, and a testimony to its merits is shown by the following letter written by the former scientific chemist to the Royal Society of Great Britain in response to an inquiry of some capitalists as to the chemical and commercial importance of the match:

In regard to the match patent by Louis V. Aronson, which patent is dated October 26, 1897, the number of which is 592,227, I beg to state that during the progress of this invention and application for patent, I carefully examined, as chemist, the various steps described therein, and have carefully considered it both commercially and chemically. My conclusions are that the process of manufacture is a simple one, the product a superior one, and the patent a broad and complete one, and can, therefore, recommend it fully and well to you. If properly placed on the market, I feel convinced that it will make a great success, as the article certainly fills a long-felt want and has not any of the objectionable features of the wind-matches heretofore placed on the market.

— (Signed) Martin E. Walstein.

In the investigations conducted for the purpose of improving this Windmatch, Aronson discovered the method for making a white phosphorus-free match. This had been a long time goal for chemical investigators in the industrial world, white phosphorus' necessity in match-making being the cause of the industrial disease called "phossy jaw."

The Belgian government had offered a prize of 50,000 francs, or $10,000, in a competition open to the whole world. This offer had stirred up scientists and chemists to redouble their efforts to produce such a match, and many came very near to eliminating this poisonous phosphorus from the match. The prize was, however, awarded to Mr. Aronson, he being adjudged the only one to produce an absolutely non-phosphorus match, and to have complied entirely with the conditions of the contest. "This triumph for American production is hoped will in time secure a generous reward to the discoverer, since negotiations are in progress with some of the largest manufacturers in the world for the rights for its production and sale."

=== 1970s: Decline ===
During the 1970s, Ronson came under increasing pressure from new competition in its core US and UK markets. The main company never returned to profitability, and the different units were soon spun off as independent companies or sold to competitors.

==== United Kingdom and International unit spun off ====
Continuing losses led to the sale of the UK division in September 1981 to Jeffrey Port, who quickly reorganized it as Ronson International. The losses continued, and the new company was in receivership by July 1982. Geoffrey Lord bought it in 1983, renamed it Ronson Exports Limited, and attempted to return to profitability by adopting the competition's approach of importing lighters produced cheaply in Asia.

In 1994, Howard Hodgson of Halkin Holdings acquired Ronson Exports Ltd for £10 million, reorganizing it again into Ronson PLC and bringing in skilled management from outside. The product line was re-expanded and the brand reintroduced worldwide. In the late 90s, there was an unsuccessful effort to expand into various "lifestyle products" such as watches and sunglasses, leading to heavy losses and the ousting of Hodgson as CEO.

Victor Kiam (owner of Remington Products) acquired a controlling interest in the company and became CEO in July 1998. Kiam embarked on cost-cutting measures, including the end of UK production for the company's premier products. By 2001, expansion into disposable lighters allowed Ronson Intl to post a marginal profit for the first time in years, but more heavy losses led to major downsizing from 2003-2004 and an abortive effort to rebrand as Powerdraught Limited.

==== North American sales ====
In 2010, the company filed for bankruptcy and the remaining intellectual property assets (i.e. trademarks) of the core North American companies were sold to longtime competitor Zippo. Zippo continues to maintain Ronson as a distinct brand identity and markets "RONSON" lighters and "RONSONOL" fuel in the US, Canada, and Mexico.

In October 2010, the still-operational Ronson Aviation branch was acquired by Landmark Aviation.

== Today ==
In North America, Zippo continues to maintain Ronson as a distinct brand identity and markets "RONSON" lighters and "RONSONOL" fuel in the US, Canada, and Mexico.

Ronson International Limited, registered in Northampton, England, sells a limited range of lighters branded with the Ronson logo to an international market (with the exception of Australia, Canada, Japan and USA).

== Ronson lighters ==
=== Banjo, De-Light and Homelighters ===
1931 Ronson De-Light Lighter Advertisement pages in Color

When, in time, technological advances were developed to allow for the manufacture of a safe flint material in 1906, Louis Aronson's ambition for an automatic pocket lighter soon became a reality. In 1913, Louis Aronson applied for a patent for a Liter (lighter), which was approved. In 1926 he released a new "automatic operation" Banjo lighter, which offered to both ignite and extinguish in a single push. It was a great success, demand shortly exceeding supply, spurring Aronson to patent it and design other products around the invention, which were marketed under the Ronson brand name. Under his leadership, the Art Metal Works began designing prototypes, and patented several generations of Igniting-Apparatus until finally arriving at the Banjo Lighter. Ronson received an exclusive patent, in 1926, for a new automatic style of lighter that worked with one hand, and in 1927 Ronson began marketing it as the Ronson De-Light Lighter with the slogan "A flip - and it's lit! Release - and it's out!" Ronson's new lighters were an overnight success worldwide and soon the company offered a variety of lighters for all tastes. As with the Art Metal Works output, many well-built and stylish early Ronson lighters demand high prices in the collectibles marketplace.

=== Pist-o-liter ===
Looking much like a long-barrel pistol, the Ronson Pist-o-Liter was exhibited at the 1912 Olympia (UK) car show on the Klaxon stand. It consisted of a file-like member which was drawn up the barrel of the pistol against a strong spring, and when the trigger was pressed it was released rubbing against a 'flinty substance' contained in the cap where the front sight of the pistol would be. This action was said to produce a constellation of sparks sufficient to light an acetylene lamp in the wildest wind. At the time acetylene lighting was standard for motor vehicles. The long barrel made the Pist-o-Liter a practical choice for applying sparks to harder-to-reach places, such as motor vehicle engines.

=== Touch tip and striker lighters ===
In the early 1930s Art Metal Works, Inc., began to manufacture a new line of Touch-Tip table lighters which became hugely popular and many stylish Art Deco designs were produced.

=== Butane lighters ===
==== Ronson Consumer Products Corporation ====
After the war, Ronson turned to producing lighters, then branched out into domestic goods such as electric shavers and cooking appliances. The company expanded to include England and Australia.

In 1967, a butane lighter factory existed in France (Bellegarde-sur-Valserine).

In the early 1980s, high costs and the advent of cheap disposable lighters forced closure of its production facility at Leatherhead in England. Now, a European branch at Long Buckby in Northamptonshire in the UK sells a range of lighters.

Ronson appliances in Australia, after being sold by the parent company, are now owned by Breville Group and the brand is a mid priced value brand with wide distribution in the Australian market

== Notable models ==
=== Whirlwind ===
First appearing in 1941, this variant was slightly larger than the "Standard" variant at the time, and featured a windproof shield that could be slid up around the lighter's wick to offer extra protection in windy environments. This model was available during the Second World War, alongside the Standard model, painted black.

=== Cadet lighter ===
This silver colored and durable square lighter was brought out to the public in 1959. This lighter was made in three variants not including the Cadet Mini, and they were made exclusively in England. One of these three versions of the Cadet even featured a wind shield. The Cadet Mini was also released in 1959, also manufactured exclusively in England. This shorter variant of the Cadet Lighter also came in four different patterns.
