= Mabel Brownell =

American stage actress and director

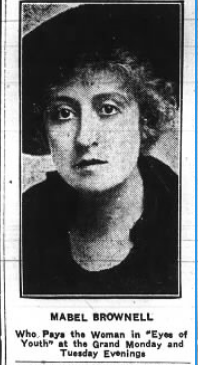
Actress Mabel Brownell, in a 1918 publicity photo.

Mabel Brownell (December 19, 1883 — January 23, 1972) was an American stage actress and director, active on Broadway in the 1920s.

== Early life ==
Mabel Brownell was born in Cincinnati, Ohio in 1883 (one source gives 1888). She graduated from Hughes High School in 1902. She also studied music and elocution.

== Career ==
Mabel Brownell made her debut in 1903, when she also made her first visit to the American West, in Beside the Bonnie Brier Bush by Ian Maclaren. Brownell appeared in a lead role in a revival of Ben-Hur on Broadway in 1907. She was also lead actress of the Mabel Brownell-Clifford Stork Company, a theatre company based in Newark, New Jersey. In 1909 she starred in William Vaughn Moody's The Great Divide in London. She acted into the 1920s, often outside of New York City.

She was known to do extensive research into her roles. In 1917 she spent six weeks living in a boarding house in McKeesport, Pennsylvania to play a laborer's wife in a steel town in Eugene Walter's Just a Woman.

In 1927, she directed Immoral Isabella; the following year, she directed two plays on Broadway: Mrs. Dane's Defense and Within the Law, both featuring a similar cast, with Violet Heming, Stanley Logan, Robert Warwick, and Julia Hoyt among the actors appearing in both. As a star of the stage version of Ben-Hur in 1907, she was invited to the premiere of the film version in 1959.

== Personal life ==
Mabel Brownell was married to businessman Louis Vincent Aronson in 1935, as his second wife. She was widowed in 1940, and she died in 1972, aged 88 years, in New York City.
