= Swift of Ipswich =

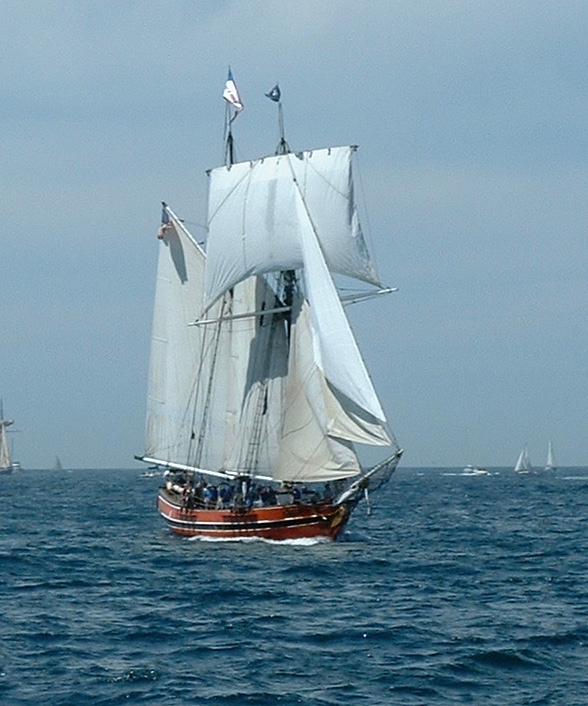
- Swift of Ipswich in 2002

History
- Name: Swift of Ipswich
- Owner: James Cagney
- Builder: W.A. Robinson Inc.
- Laid down: 1938
- Launched: 1939
- Acquired: 1940
- Status: Yacht
- Notes: Designer, Howard I. Chapelle
- Owner: Swift Associates Ltd.
- Acquired: 1963
- Owner: Los Angeles Maritime Institute
- Acquired: 1991
- Status: School ship

General characteristics
- Type: Topsail Schooner
- Length: 70 feet
- Beam: 18.2 feet
- Draft: 9 feet
- Propulsion: 165 h.p. General Motors Diesel

Swift of Ipswich is a topsail schooner owned and operated by the Los Angeles Maritime Institute's TopSail Youth Program as a sail training vessel for at-risk youth.

== History ==
Originally built in Ipswich, Massachusetts as a private yacht, Swift of Ipswich is a reduced-scale replica of Swift, an American privateer from the Revolutionary War which was captured by the Royal Navy, transported to Britain, and deconstructed. The drawings produced from the original Swift have been used as the basis for several tall ship designs, mostly due to their completeness in an era which produced few detailed drawings (most ship designs having been scale models which have not survived intact). Soon after completion, Swift of Ipswich was sold to actor James Cagney and transported to Newport Beach, where she served as his private yacht and appeared in numerous Hollywood films.

After being sold by Cagney in 1958, the Swift was used for various purposes, such as harbor tours, before being acquired by the Los Angeles Maritime Institute in 1991.

Swift of Ipswich participated in the Clash of the Tall Ships II in Long Beach Harbor in January, 1998.

== Reconstruction ==
After the delivery of the twin brigantines Irving Johnson and Exy Johnson, Swift went into semi-retirement while fundraising proceeded to begin an extensive rebuilding, necessary after over 65 years of wear, tear, and exposure to salt water. Currently, work has begun on the reconstruction, although no firm completion date has been given. Extensive electrical and mechanical work has been completed. The main engine was started and approved for operation by John Deere technicians on April 3, 2024. Following a maintenance haul-out in August 2024, the vessel entered its final restoration phase, with completion projected for late 2026.
