= Robina F. Hardy =

- Born: Robina Forrester Hardy; 1835; Edinburgh, Scotland
- Died: 1891 (aged 55–56)
- Occupations: Writer, poet, editor, teacher, missionary
- Notable work: Jock Halliday: a Grassmarket Hero Glenairlie; or, the Last of the Graemes

Robina Forrester Hardy (1835–1891) was a Scottish Victorian author, poet and Christian missionary.

== Life and career ==
Hardy was the daughter of a doctor, Dr. Thomas Hardy, and grand-daughter of a minister at St. Giles' Cathedral, Rev. Thomas Hardy.

=== Career and Works ===
Hardy's fiction draws on the experiences she gained whilst working as a missionary in the Grassmarket slums, described as 'brutally realistic'. Andrew Nash sees her novel Jock Halliday: A Grassmarket Hero (1883) as influenced by Samuel Smiles' ideas on self help. Her work has also been linked to the Scottish kailyard school and the popular fiction of Annie S. Swan. Furthermore, she became a contributor and sub-editor for the Morning Rays, a Church of Scotland magazine for children, with much of her children's literature subsequently being published separately. Other work includes her time as a cookery teacher at Dr. William Robertson's Vennel School for girls.

== Works ==
- Whin-bloom (1879; poems)
- Hester Glen's Holidays, and How She Spent Them (1881)
- The Pearl Necklace: a Story for the Young (1881)
- Little Goldenlocks (1882)
- Nannette's New Shoes (1882)
- Jock Halliday: a Grassmarket Hero (1883)
- Glenairlie; or, the Last of the Graemes (1884)
- Tom Telfer's Shadow: a Story of Everyday Life (1884)
- Trot's message; or, 'Whom have I in Heaven but Thee?' (1884)
- Katie: an Edinburgh Lassie (1886)
- The Story of a Cuckoo Clock (1887)
- The Good Ship Rover (1888)
- Hilda’s Fortune (1888)
- Kilgarvie (1889)
- Johnnie; or, 'Only a Life' (1889)
- Diarmid; or, Friends in Kettletown (1889)
- Fanny's Old Frock (1890)
- Tibby's Tryst; or, 'I Will Lift Up Mine Eyes Unto the Hills' (1891)
- Polly, Who was 'Nobody's Child' (1891)
- His Own Master (1891)
