= Thomas Nicoll Hepburn =

Scottish writer

- Born: 21 April 1861; West Wemyss, Fife, Scotland, UK
- Died: 1 September 1930 (aged 69); London
- Occupations: Writer; poet; novelist; biographer
- Writing career
- Pen name: Gabriel Setoun
- Genres: Non-fiction, biography, poetry, novels

Thomas Nicoll Hepburn (21 April 1861 – 1 September 1930) was a Scottish poet and author who wrote under the pseudonym of Gabriel Setoun. He wrote poems such as 'Jack Frost', 'Romance' and 'The World's Music.' He also wrote novels in the 'Kailyard school' style such as Barncraig and Robert Urquhart (1896).

== Biography ==
He was born on 21 April 1861 in West Wemyss, Fife. His father, Alexander Hepburn was a tailor. He died in London around September 1930.

== Some Published Works ==
- The Child World, London: Bodley Head, 1893.
- Barncraig: Episodes in the Life of a Scottish Village, London: J. Murray, 1893.
- Sunshine and Haar: Some Further Glimpses of Life at Barncraig, London: J. Murray, 1895
- Robert Urquhart, London: Bliss Sands and Foster, 1896.
- Robert Burns, Edinburgh: Oliphant, Anderson and Ferrier, 1896, ("Famous Scots Series")
- George Malcolm, London: Bliss Sands & Co, 1897.
- The Skipper of Barncraig, London: A. Constable & Co., 1901.
