= Jane Barlow =

Irish novelist and poet (1856–1917)

Jane Barlow D.Litt
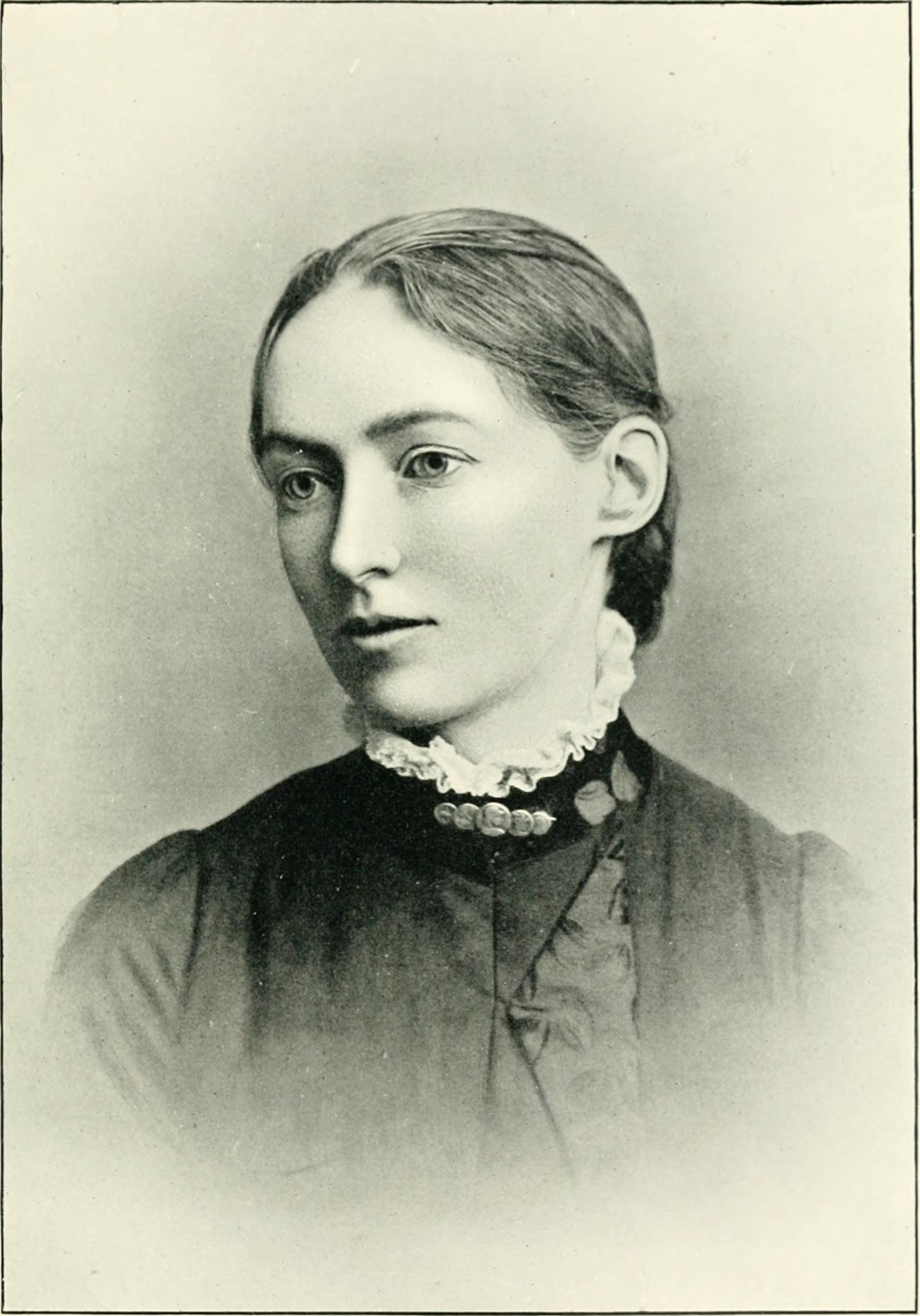
- A portrait of Jane Barlow from a photograph by Lafayette Studio (1903).
- Born: Jane Barlow; 17 October 1856; Dollymount, Clontarf, County Dublin, Ireland
- Died: 17 April 1917 (aged 60); Bray, County Wicklow, Ireland
- Resting place: Mount Jerome Cemetery, Dublin
- Education: Trinity College Dublin
- Occupation: Writer
- Writing career
- Pen name: Felix Ryark; Antares Skorpios
- Notable works: Irish Idylls; Kerrigan's Quality; Strangers at Lisconnell

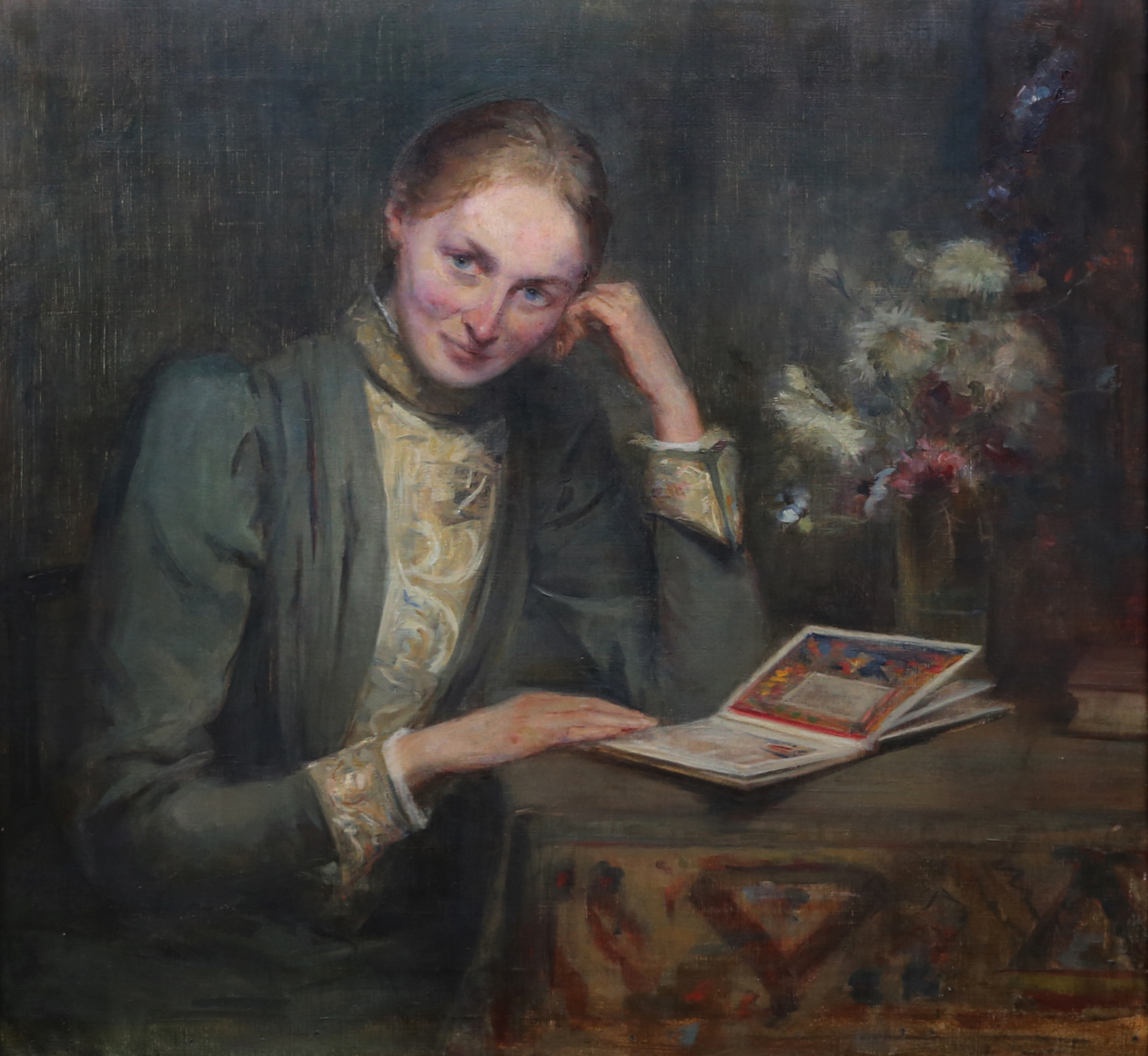
A portrait of Jane Barlow as painted by her friend, Irish painter Sarah Purser, in 1894. The painting is held by Hugh Lane Gallery in Dublin, Ireland.

Jane Barlow (17 October 1856 – 17 April 1917) was an Irish writer, noted for her novels and poems describing the lives of the Irish peasantry, chiefly about Lisconnell and Ballyhoy, in relation to both landlords and the Great Famine.

== Life ==
Barlow was the second child and eldest daughter of Rev. James William Barlow, vice-provost of Trinity College Dublin. Born in Dollymount, Clontarf, County Dublin, she spent most of her life living in Raheny, then a village in County Dublin, in the house in the townland of Ballyhoy which then was called "The Cottage":

The house was known by various names over the years, as "Ballyhoy", "The Cottage" and "Raheny House". Built in the 18th century, originally with a thatched roof, another wing was added in the 1840s. [...] In 1986, it became the Garda Siochána Retirement Home and the original house was incorporated into the new additions.

She was educated by the family's governess and her father. She became proficient in French and German, and was a talented classical scholar and an accomplished pianist. She travelled much throughout Ireland, and in her twenties visited Italy, France, Greece, and Turkey.

"Miss Barlow" had great success with the collection of stories Irish Idylls (1892). Running into nine editions, it was read in France, Germany, Britain, and America. When Trinity College Dublin began to grant degrees to women, Barlow was one of the first "to receive the highest honorary distinction that ancient seat of learning could bestow", a Doctor of Letters (D.Litt.). She was a contributor to the National Literary Society in Dublin and was friends with Katharine Tynan and Sarah Purser, who painted her portrait in 1894.

After the death of her father in 1913 she and her siblings moved to Bray, County Wicklow. By this time, she was suffering from poor health and low spirits, but she continued with her writing.

Barlow was a member of the Society for Psychical Research for more than 25 years. Shortly before her death, she was elected to its Committee of Reference and Publication.

=== Death ===
Barlow died on 17 April 1917, in Bray. In its glowing obituary (18 April 1917), The Irish Times reported nothing of her health, nor a cause of death.

Barlow is buried with her father, mother, and one of her sisters at Mount Jerome Cemetery, Dublin.

== Works ==
Barlow published under her own name and under the pseudonym Felix Ryark. She co-wrote with her father under the pseudonym Antares Skorpios. Barlow's novels and poetry collections include:

- History of a World of Immortals Without a God (McGee, 1891), as Antares Skorpios
- Bog-land Studies (Unwin, 1892)
- Irish Idylls (Hodder & Stoughton, 1892) — went into nine editions. Illustrations by Clifton Johnson
- The End of Elfintown (Macmillan, 1894) — fairy poetry illustrated by Laurence Housman, LCCN 02-6329
- Kerrigan's Quality (Hodder & Stoughton, 1894) — with 8 illustrations
- The Battle of the Frogs and Mice (Methuen, 1894) — a translation of the Greek mock-epic Batrachomyomachia with illustrations by Francis Donkin Bedford
- Strangers at Lisconnell, a Second Series of Irish Idylls (1895)
- Maureen's Fairing, and Other Stories (Dent, 1895) — illustrations by Bertha Newcombe
- Mrs. Martin's Company, and Other Stories (Dent, 1896) — illustrations by Bertha Newcombe
- A Creel of Irish Stories (Methuen, 1897)
- From the East unto the West (Methuen, 1898)
- From the Land of the Shamrock (Methuen, 1900) — short stories
- Ghost-Bereft, with Other Stories and Studies in Verse (Smith, Elder & Co., 1901)
- The Founding of Fortunes (Methuen, 1902)
- By Beach and Bog Land (Unwin, 1905)
- Irish Neighbours (Hutchinson, 1907)
- The Mockers, and Other Verses (Allen, 1908)
- A Strange Land (Hutchinson, 1908), as Felix Ryark — a "lost race" tale
- Irish Ways (Allen, 1909) — illustrations by Warwick Goble
- Mac's Adventures (Hutchinson, 1911) — dedicated to Algernon Charles Swinburne
- Flaws, a Novel (Hutchinson, 1911)
- Doings and Dealings (Hutchinson, 1913)
- Between Doubting and Daring (Blackwell, 1916)
- In Mio's Youth (Hutchinson, 1917)

In the United States, Barlow's works were published by Dodd, Mead & Co.

=== A Bunch of Lavender ===
Barlow wrote a play titled A Bunch of Lavender, staged by the Theatre of Ireland on December 18th, 1911. Because it was not a success, the play was never published.
