= The Bonnie Brier Bush =

1921 British film by Donald Crisp

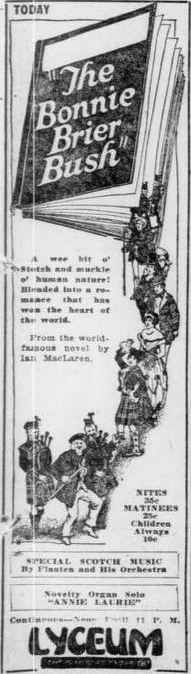
- American newspaper ad
- Directed by: Donald Crisp
- Written by: James MacArthur; Augustus E. Thomas; Margaret Turnbull
- Based on: The Bonnie Brier Bush by Ian Maclaren
- Starring: Donald Crisp
- Cinematography: Claude L. McDonnell
- Distributed by: Famous Players–Lasky British Producers
- Release date: 27 November 1921
- Running time: 50 minutes
- Country: United Kingdom
- Language: Silent (English intertitles)

The Bonnie Brier Bush is a 1921 British drama film directed by Donald Crisp. Alfred Hitchcock is credited as a title designer. The film is considered to be lost.

== Plot ==
As described in a film magazine, dour Scottish shepherd Lachlan Campbell is exceedingly harsh with his daughter Flora. Flora and Lord Malcolm Hay, the son of the Earl of Kinspindle), marry secretly according to Scottish custom, and parental objection leads to misunderstandings followed by separation and misery. A logical resolution leads to a satisfactory ending.

== Cast ==
- Donald Crisp as Lachlan Campbell
- Mary Glynne as Flora Campbell
- Alec Fraser as Lord Malcolm Hay
- Dorothy Fane as Kate Carnegie
- Jack East as Posty
- Langhorn Burton as John Carmichael (credited as Langhorne Burton)
- Jerrold Robertshaw as Earl of Kinspindle
- Adeline Hayden Coffin as Margaret Howe (credited as Mrs. Hayden-Coffin)

== See also ==
- Alfred Hitchcock filmography
