= Electa Johnson =

American sailing instructor and adventurer (1909–2004)

Exy Johnson
- Born: August 17, 1909; Rochester, New York, U.S.
- Died: November 9, 2004 (aged 95); Hadley, Massachusetts, U.S.
- Occupation: Sailor
- Spouse: Irving Johnson (m. 1932; died 1991)

Electa S. "Exy" Johnson (August 17, 1909 – November 9, 2004) was an American author, lecturer, adventurer, and sail training pioneer.

She completed many sailing feats, including sailing around the world seven times while training younger sailors.

== Early life ==
Electa "Exy" Johnson was born in Rochester, New York on August 17, 1909. She attended Smith College and then University of California, Berkeley. Exy Johnson's sailing experience started after her years in college when she boarded a schooner set to sail around France. Exy Johnson was fluent in French and German, and also had the ability to communicate in other languages. While aboard the schooner touring France she met her soon to be husband Irving Johnson, who at the time was a crew member aboard the schooner. In 1932 Exy and Irving got married and began their sailing career together.

== Teaching sailing ==
Exy and Irving Johnson began sailing the world together and teaching young enthusiasts in 1932. From then until 1958, they went on seven tours, three before World War II and four after, all of which circumnavigated the world. Exy and Irving did not sail during the war. Each tour had a new crew of two dozen fresh recruits ready to learn. Each voyage would visit 120 ports of call and crew members paid $4,860 to participate. Each tour lasted about 18 months after which Exy and Irving would take 18 months off. During their breaks, they would work on their books, lecture students, and work on films. The books they wrote are listed below. Also if Exy and Irving had free time during their summer off they would show young girl scouts how to sail by sailing up and down the coast of New England.

Exy and Irving used different types of sailing vessels for training their crew mates. The first ship they had was a 92-foot wooden schooner named Yankee. The next ship they used for training was a 96-foot steel brigantine also named Yankee. Their final ship was a 50-foot ketch named Yankee. This ketch was primarily for their own personal use after their years of training. In her lifetime, Exy sailed further than the distance to the Moon.

== Later years ==
Exy and Irving had two children. Before the children could walk they boarded ship as "Ship's Baby" and began to sail with the family.

After 1958, when Exy and Irving were done teaching young people how to sail on seagoing vessels, they sailed from 1958 to 1975 in more confined waters. On this they mainly sailed their 50-foot ketch and toured around exploring the European waterways with paying guests.

Exy finally retired from sailing in 1975 where she and her husband settled down in Hadley, Massachusetts on the farm that Irving had grown up on. Irving died in 1991. The Los Angeles Maritime Institute has honored Irving and Exy by naming their twin brigantines for use in their award-winning Topsail Youth program after them, Irving Johnson and Exy Johnson. Exy Johnson oversaw the christening ceremonies of the vessels she was instrumental in constructing prior to her death in 2004.

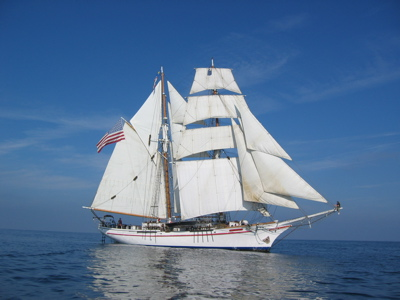
The tall ship Exy Johnson named in her honor

== Books ==
=== Westward Bound in the Schooner Yankee ===
Westward Bound in the Schooner Yankee tells of Exy and Irving's first trip around the world. The Yankee left her home port Gloucester and hit notable ports all around the world including The Galapagos, Tahiti, The Cook Islands, Fiji, The Solomon Islands, and much more before heading home. During their first trip around the world they discovered one of the tallest waterfalls in the world which they named Yankee falls. During the 18-month trip Exy and the crew of the Yankee experienced native cultures that few even knew about at the time.

=== Yankee Sails Across Europe ===
Exy and Irving trips in the European water ways took them over 10,000 miles in the Mediterranean and Baltic seas and the canals between them. The Yankee's home base during their trip was the island of Ischia in the bay of Naples. During their trip they went to Corfu and the port island by Odysseus and St. Paul. They then sailed westward to Sicily and Elba. They then sailed in Switzerland after they sailed down into the Netherlands and Germany. After Germany they headed to Denmark and then back to the Baltic taking them to Finland. Once back in the Mediterranean they had ports of call in Corsica and ended back in Ischia.

=== Yankee Sails the Nile ===
Yankee Sails the Nile is about Exy and Irving's trip on the Nile before the building of the Aswan High Dam which would cut off part of the Nile. They were the last foreign vessel up the Nile. They sailed the heavy traffic of the Nile starting in Nile delta and headed down to Cairo. After Cairo the Yankee Sailed to see the Pyramids of Karnack and the tomb of Abu Simbel.

=== Bibliography ===
- Johnson, Irving; Johnson, Harriet Electa Search (1936). Westward bound in the schooner Yankee. W. W. Norton.
- Johnson, Irving; Johnson, Electa (1939). Sailing to see: picture cruise in the schooner Yankee. W. W. Norton.
- Johnson, Irving; Johnson, Electa (1949). Yankee's wander world: circling the globe in the brigantine 'Yankee'. W. W. Norton.
- Johnson, Irving; Johnson, Electa; Edes, Lydia (1955). Yankee's people and places. Norton.
- Johnson, Irving; Johnson, Harriet Eleca Search (1962). Yankee sails across Europe. Norton.
- Johnson, Irving; Johnson, Electa (1966). Yankee sails the Nile. Norton.

== Articles ==
- Irving and Electa Johnson; Westward Bound in the Yankee (National Geographic Magazine, January 1942)
- Irving and Electa Johnson; The Yankee's Wander World (National Geographic Magazine, January 1949)
- Irving and Electa Johnson. Yankee Roams the Orient (National Geographic Magazine, March 1951)
- Irving and Electa Johnson; South Seas Incredible Land Divers (National Geographic Magazine, January 1955)
- Irving and Electa Johnson; The New Yankee (Yachts and Yachting, October 10, 1958)
- Irving and Electa Johnson; Lost World of the Galapagos (National Geographic Magazine, May 1959)
- Irving and Electa Johnson; New Guinea to Bali in Yankee (National Geographic Magazine, December 1959)
- Irving and Electa Johnson; Inside Europe Aboard Yankee (National Geographic Magazine, August 1964)
- Irving and Electa Johnson; Yankee Cruises the Storied Nile (National Geographic Magazine, May 1965)
- Irving and Electa Johnson; Yankee Sails Turkey's History-Haunted Coast (National Geographic Magazine, December 1969)
- Electa Johnson; Yankee Cruises Inland Italy: Part I (Yachting, July 1973)
- Electa Johnson; Yankee Cruises Inland Italy: Part II (Yachting, August 1973)

== Films ==
- Yankee Sails Across Europe (National Geographic Society, 1967)
- Voyage of the Brigantine Yankee (National Geographic Society, 1968)
- Irving Johnson: High Seas Adventurer (National Geographic Society, 1985)
- Around Cape Horn (Mystic Seaport, 1985) (from original 16 mm footage shot by Irving Johnson, 1929)
- Unfurling the World: The Voyages of Irving and Electa Johnson (Mystic Seaport, 2012)
