= Ian Maclaren =

Scottish writer John Watson (1850–1907)

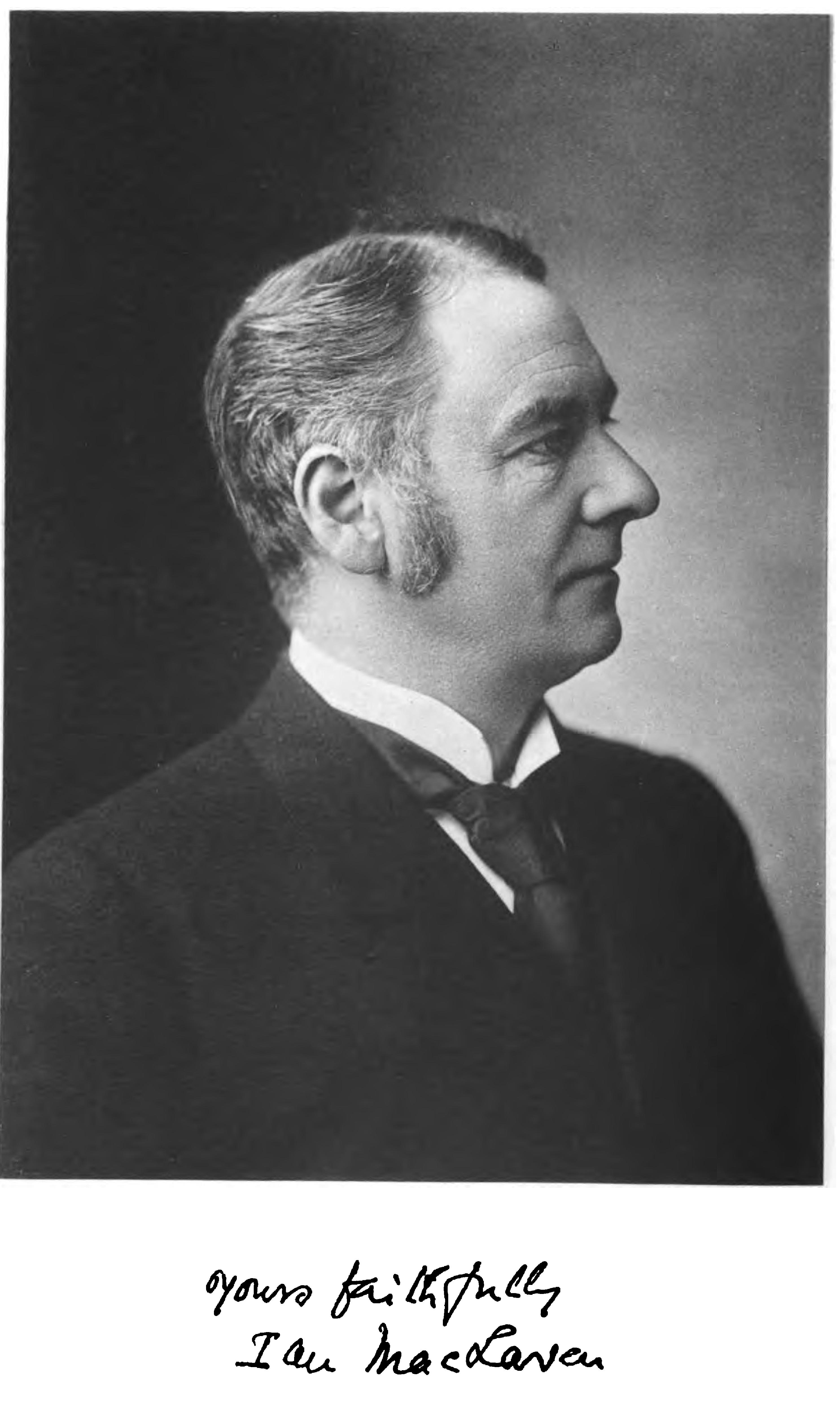
- Born: John Watson; 3 November 1850; Manningtree, Essex, England
- Died: 6 May 1907 (aged 56); Mount Pleasant, Iowa, U.S.

John Watson (3 November 1850 – 6 May 1907), was a minister of the Free Church of Scotland. He is remembered as an author of fiction, known by his pen name Ian Maclaren.

== Life ==
The son of John Watson, a civil servant, he was born in Manningtree, Essex, and educated at Stirling. His paternal uncle Rev Hiram Watson (1813–1891) was a minister of the Free Church of Scotland and John appears to have chosen to follow in his shoes.

He studied at Edinburgh University, then trained as a Free Church minister at New College in Edinburgh, also undertaking some postgraduate study at Tübingen.

In 1874 he was licensed by the Free Church of Scotland and became assistant minister of Edinburgh Barclay Church. In 1875 he was ordained as minister at Logiealmond in Perthshire. In 1877 he was transferred to St Matthews Free Church in Glasgow. In Glasgow he lived at 44 Windsor Terrace. In 1880 he became minister of Sefton Park Presbyterian Church in Liverpool, from which he retired in 1905. During this period he was a main mover in the founding of the Westminster College in Cambridge.

In 1896 he was Lyman Beecher lecturer at Yale University, and in 1900 he was moderator of the synod of the English Presbyterian Church. While travelling in the United States he died from blood poisoning, following a bout with tonsillitis, at Mount Pleasant, Iowa. His body was returned to England, and buried in Smithdown Cemetery in Liverpool.

Maclaren's first stories of rural Scottish life, Beside the Bonnie Brier Bush (1894), achieved extraordinary popularity, selling more than 700,000 copies, and was succeeded by other successful books, The Days of Auld Lang Syne (1895), Kate Carnegie and those Ministers (1896), and Afterwards and other Stories (1898). By his own name Watson published several volumes of sermons, among them being The Upper Room (1895), The Mind of the Master (1896) and The Potter's Wheel (1897). Today he is regarded as one of the principal writers of the Kailyard school.

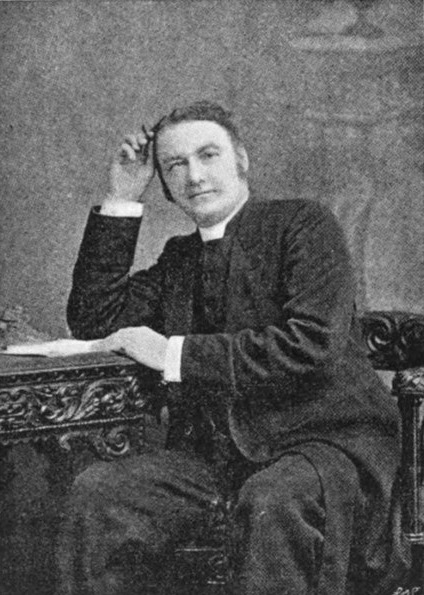
Photo of Maclaren in March 1895 edition of The Bookman (New York City)

It is thought that Maclaren was the original source of the quotation "Be kind, for everyone you meet is fighting a hard battle," now widely misattributed to Plato or Philo of Alexandria. The oldest known instance of this quotation is in the 1897 Christmas edition of The British Weekly, penned by Maclaren: "Be pitiful, for every man is fighting a hard battle."

The highly impressive St Matthews Free Church became the Highland Memorial Church in 1941 and was destroyed by fire in 1952.

== Family ==
In 1878, Maclaren married Jane B. Ferguson.

== Bibliography ==
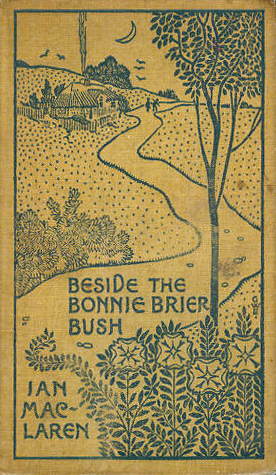
Cover of Beside the Bonnie Briar Bush (1894)

=== Fiction as Ian Maclaren ===
- Maclaren, Ian (1894). Beside the Bonnie Brier Bush.
- Maclaren, Ian (1895). The Days of Auld Lang Syne.
- Maclaren, Ian (1895). A Doctor of the Old School.
- Maclaren, Ian (1896). Kate Carnegie and those Ministers.
- Maclaren, Ian (1898). Afterwards and other Stories.
- Maclaren, Ian (1898). Rabbi Saunderson.
- Maclaren, Ian (1899). Young Barbarians.
- Maclaren, Ian (1907). Graham of Claverhouse.
- Maclaren, Ian (1907). St. Jude's. Philadelphia: Sunday School Times Company. Short stories.

=== Non-fiction as Ian Maclaren ===
- Maclaren, Ian; Wharton, Henry Marvin; Buel, James William (1899). The light of the world, or, the Bible illuminated and explained: A complete story of Bible history that narrates in chronological arrangement all the teachings and events recorded in scripture, from Genesis to Revelation. Standard Pub.
- "Ian Maclaren" (Dr. John Watson) (1900). Church Folks: Being practical studies in congregational life. New York City: Doubleday, Page, & Co.
- Maclaren, Ian (1912). Books and Bookmen. London: James Nisbet. — a description of booksellers in general, the industry, and the books that are sold.
- Maclaren, Ian; Buel, James William (1913). Illustrated Bible stories for young and old.

=== Books of sermons as John Watson ===
- John Watson (Ian Maclaren) (1895). The Upper Room. New York City: Dodd, Mead, and company.
- Watson, John (1896). The Mind of the Master. New York City: Dodd, Mead. ISBN 978-0-8370-4236-7.
- John Watson (Ian Maclaren) (1897). Ideals of strength: Together with a sketch of his life. New York: Wilbur B. Ketcham.
- Watson, John (1897). The Potter's Wheel.
- Watson, John (1898). Companions of the Sorrowful Way.
- Watson, John (1899). In Answer to Prayer: The Touch of the Unseen. - A book of sermons cowritten with Rev. W. Boyd Carpenter (Lord Bishop of Ripon 11), Rev. Theodore L. Cuyler, Rev. Canon Knox Little, William Quarrier, Leonard K. Shaw, Rev. R. F. Horton, Rev. H. Price Hughes, Rev. J. Clifford, G. D. Boyle (Dean of Salisbury)
- Watson, John (1905). The inspiration of our faith and other sermons. London: Hodder & Stoughton.

=== Other books as John Watson ===
- Watson, John (1896). The Cure of Souls. Lyman Beecher lectures on preaching at Yale University. New York City: Dodd, Mead, and company.
- Watson, John (1898). Companions of the sorrowful way. London: Hodder & Stoughton.
- Watson, John (1903). The homely virtues. London: Hodder & Stoughton.
- Watson, John (1907). The Scot of the eighteenth century: his religion and his life.
- Watson, John (1907). God's message to the human soul: The use of the Bible in the light of the new knowledge. Cole Lectures of the Vanderbilt University. London: Hodder & Stoughton.
- Watson, John (1909). Respectable sins. Hodder & Stoughton. Collection of essays on specific vices.
- Watson, John (1912). Children of the Resurrection.
