= 1890s =

Decade

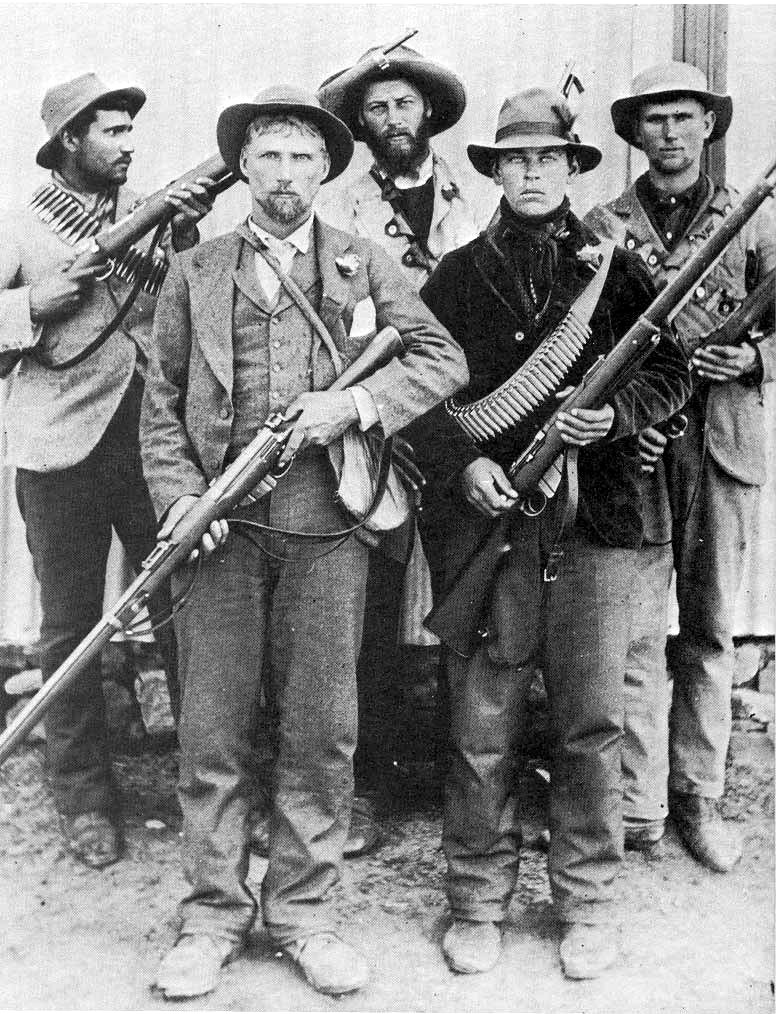
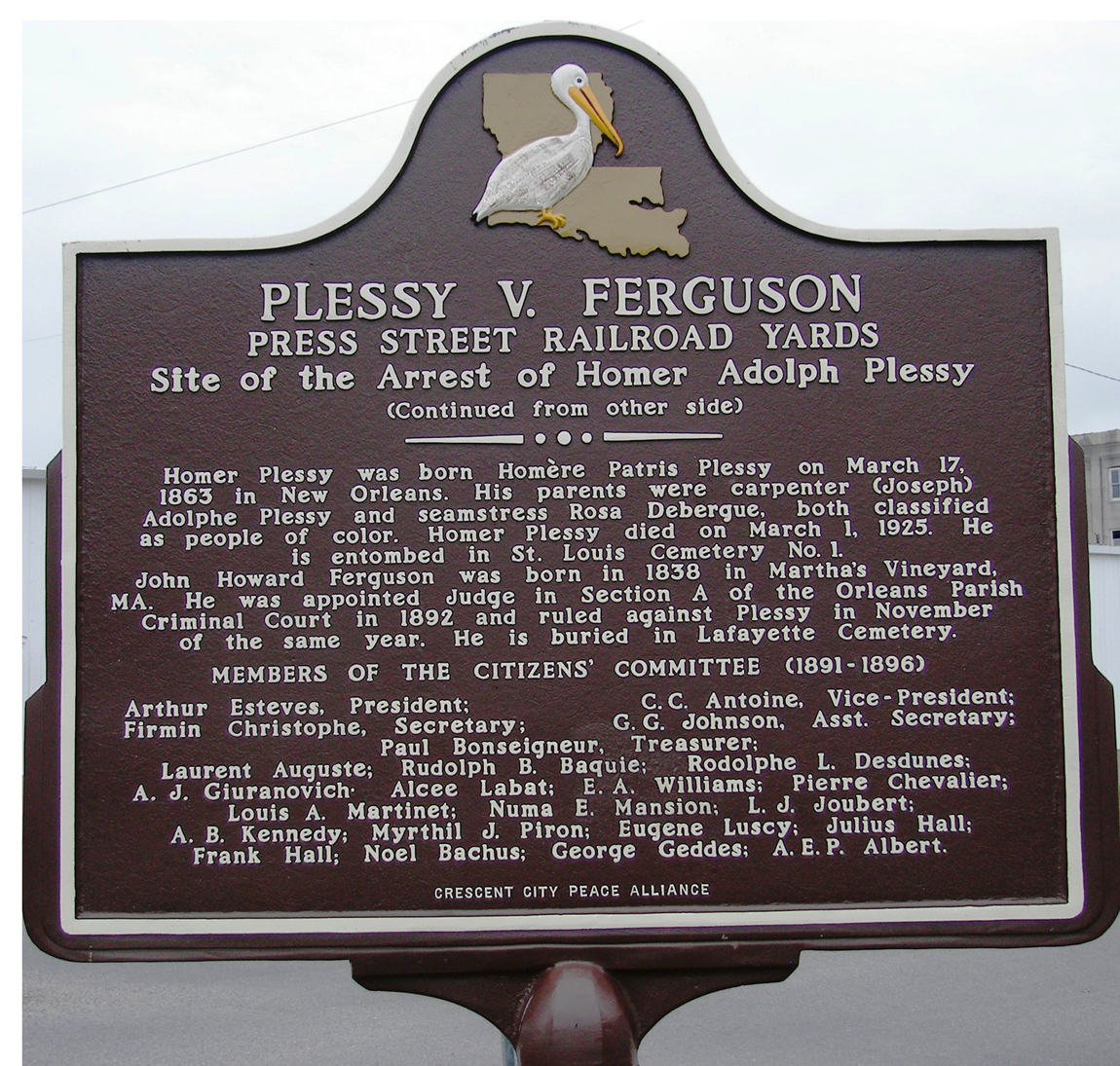
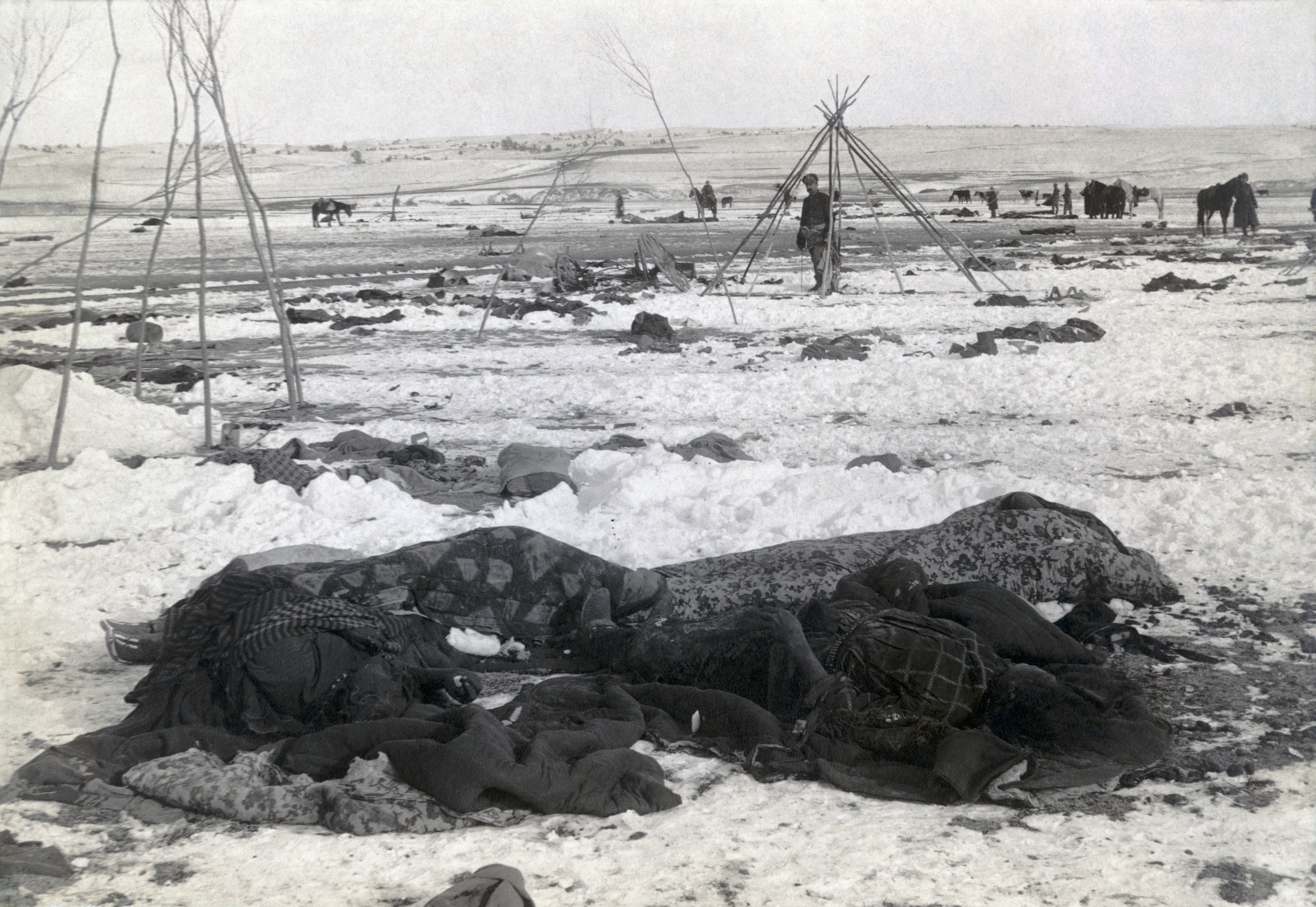
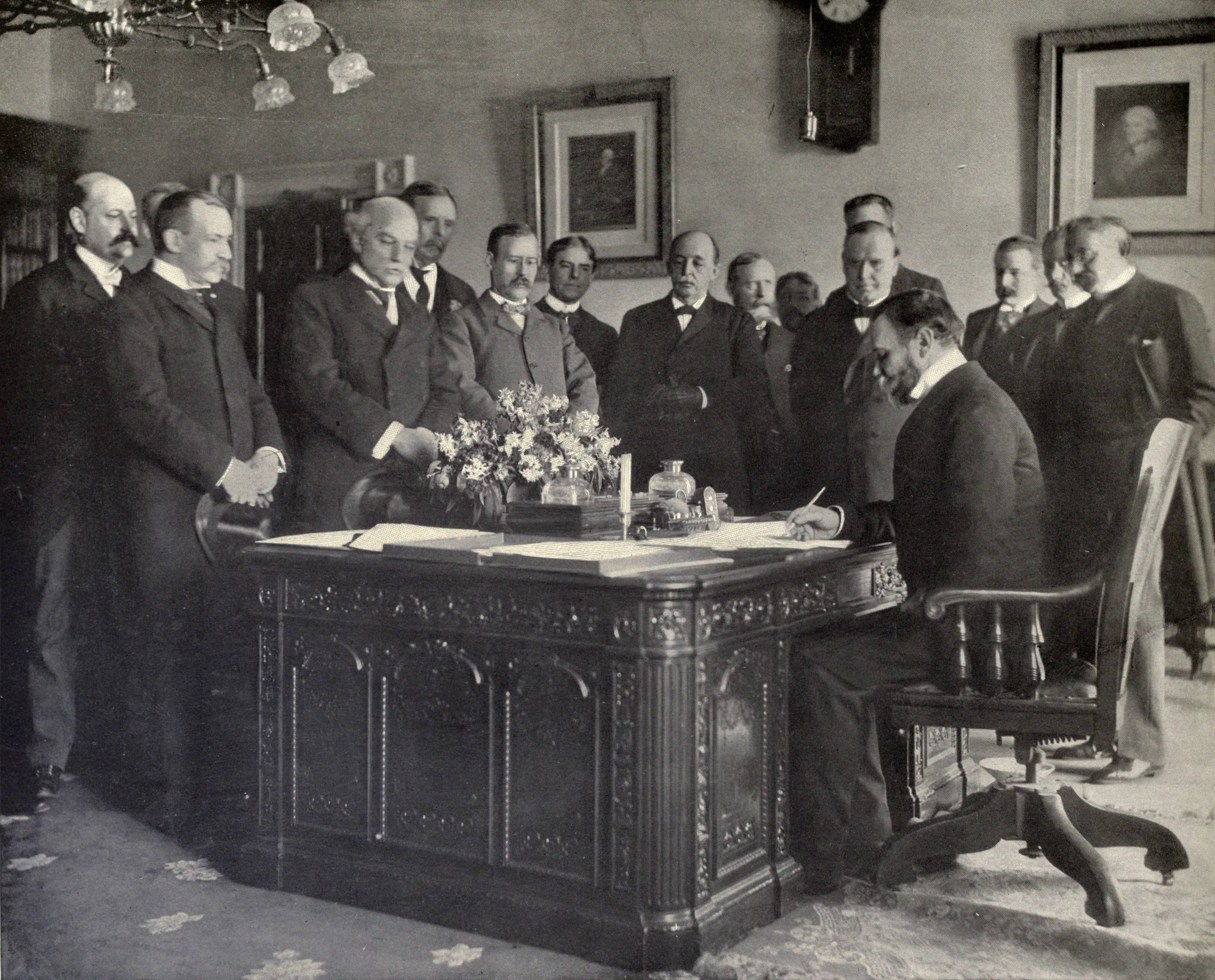
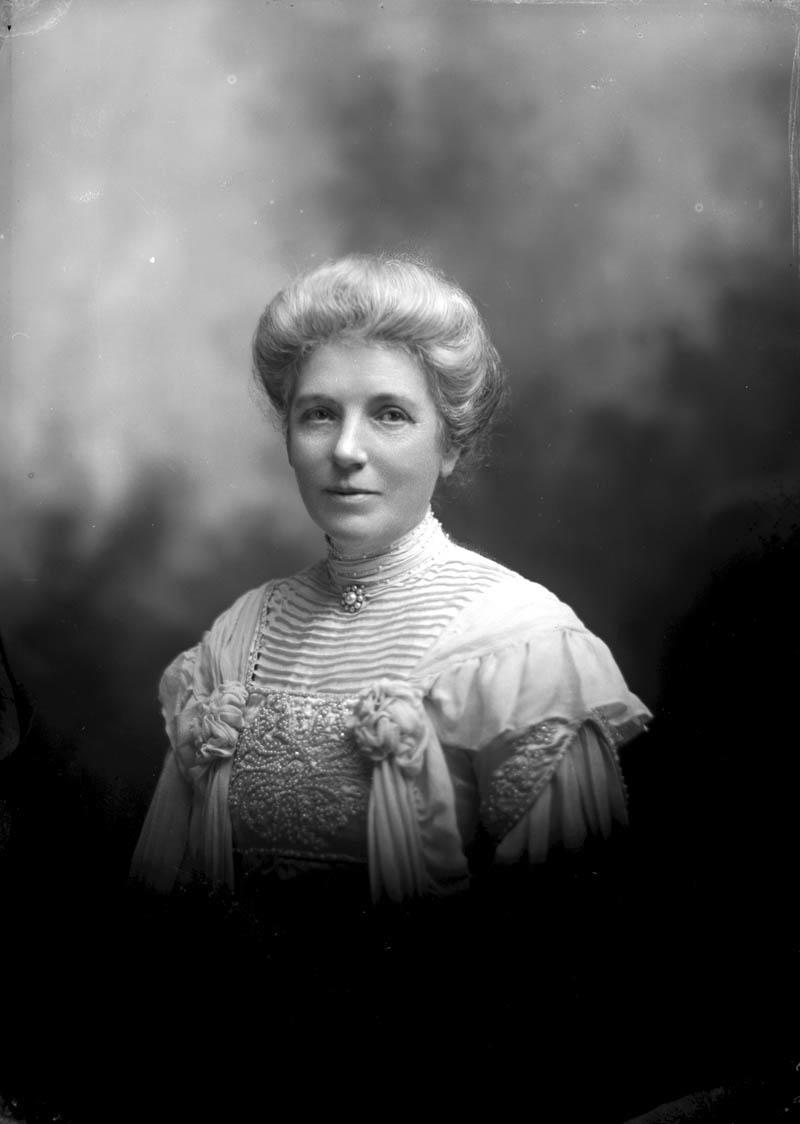
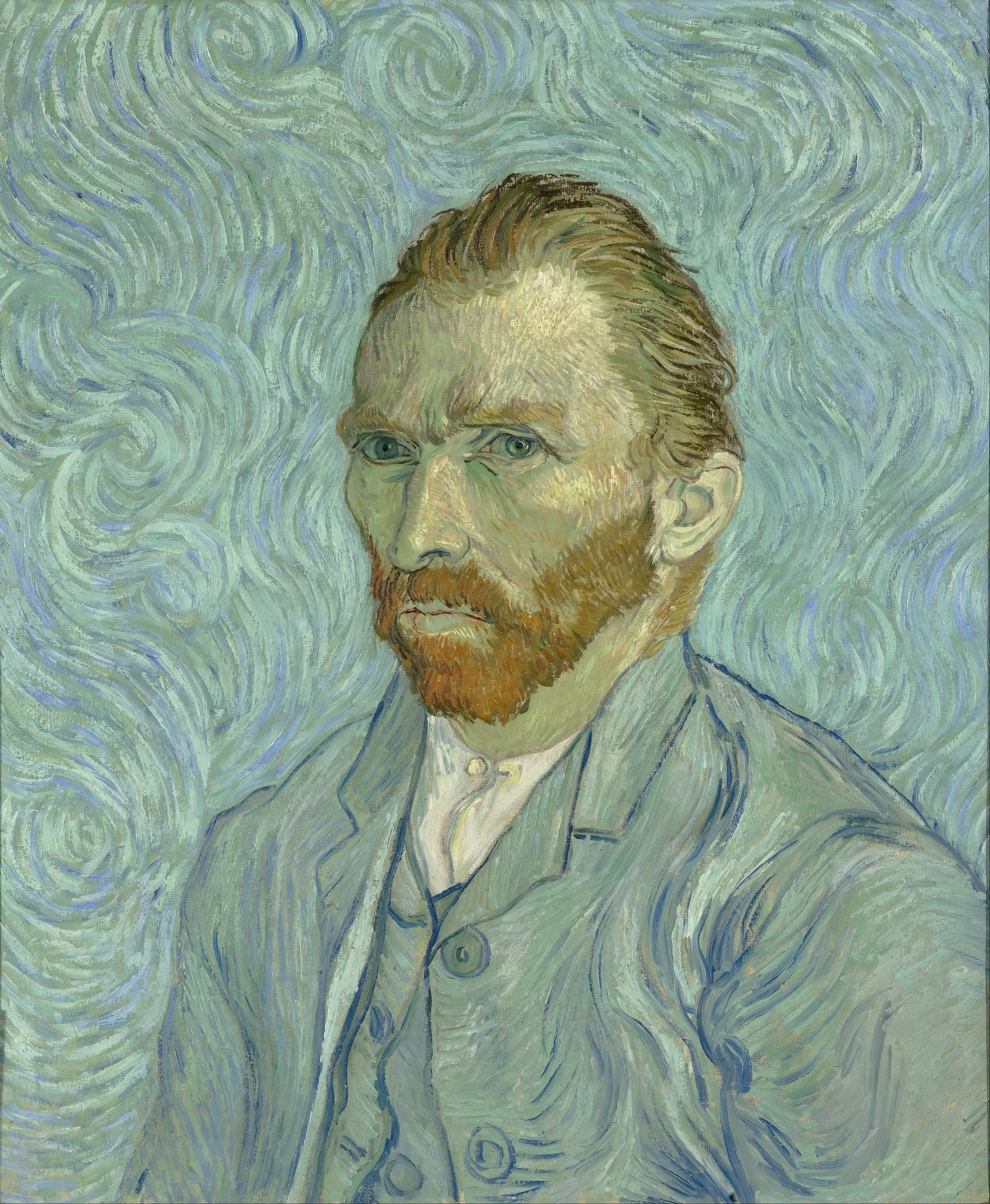
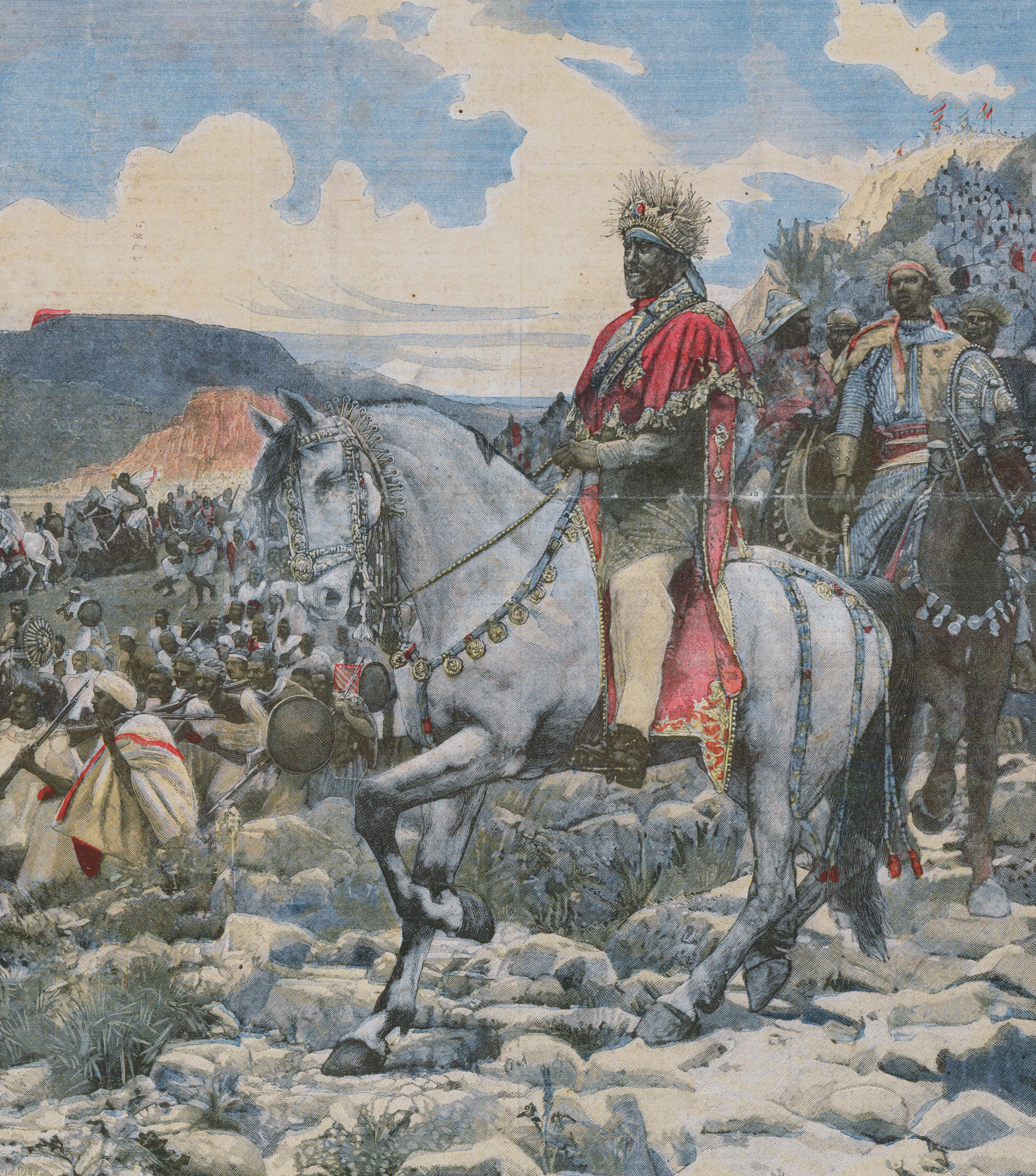
From top to bottom, left to right: Theodore Roosevelt as Colonel of the Rough Riders which he led to victory at the Battle of San Juan Hill, 1898; Boer commandos during the Second Boer War, late 1890s; Plessy v. Ferguson establishes the American doctrine of racial segregation, leading to the Jim Crow laws, photographed in 1899; nearly three hundred ethnic Lakota people are massacred by the United States Army at Wounded Knee in 1890; the U.S. pays $20 million to annex the Philippines from Spain in the Treaty of Paris in 1898; activism spearheaded by Kate Sheppard, pictured in 1905, leads to New Zealand being the first country to give women the right to vote; Vincent van Gogh, the Dutch master of modern art, dies, likely by suicide in 1890; Menelik II leads Ethiopia to a sweeping victory over Italy at the Battle of Adwa, First Italo-Ethiopian War between 1895 and 1896.

The 1890s (pronounced "eighteen-nineties") was a decade of the Gregorian calendar that began on January 1, 1890, and ended on December 31, 1899. In American popular culture, the decade would later be nostalgically referred to as the "gay nineties" ("gay" meaning carefree or cheerful). The decade took place during what historians call the Victorian Era in the history of the United Kingdom, the Belle Époque in the history of France, and the Gilded Age in the history of the United States.

As European powers continued their colonial expansion, the decade saw the defeat of Edi (1890), Siam (1893), Morocco (1894), Dahomey (1894), Arab-Swahili warlords (1894), Lombork (1894), Pahang (1895), Merina (1895), Zanzibar (1896), Khaua and Mbandjeru (1896), Ashanti (1896), Matabeleland (1897), Pedir (1898), Sudan (1899), and various north-west Indian tribes and states. Whereas most colonial campaigns were successful, Italy faced a significant defeat as it failed to conquer Ethiopia, being decisively defeated at Adwa (1896). Furthermore, the second half of the decade saw the final unravelling of Spanish America, which began with insurrections in Cuba (1895) and the Philippines (1896) and ended with the Spaniards' defeat at the hands of the United States in 1898. Following the sale of various Pacific islands to Germany in 1899, the Spanish colonial empire would be restricted to Africa. Further in the east, Japan sought to expand its own empire, waging wars against Donghak (1894–1895), Qing China (1894–1895) and the Republic of Formosa (1895). Other conflicts included the Garza War (1891–1893), the Greco-Turkish War (1897) and internal conflicts in Samoa (1886–1894, 1898–1899), Afghanistan (1888–1893), Argentina (1890), Chile (1891), the Ottoman Empire (1891, 1893, 1894, 1895–96, 1896–1897, 1896), Mexico (1891–1892), Brazil (1893–1894, 1893–1895, 1899–1903), Peru (1894–1895), the South African Republic (1894), northwest China (1895–1896), Bolivia (1898–1899) and Columbia (1899–1902).

The decade was characterized by an international economic depression ending in 1896 with the beginning of strong economic growth. The Second Industrial Revolution featured major innovations especially electricity, gasoline, automobiles, textiles, and organic chemistry). The decade also saw the apogee of the coal-powered steam engine. In the United States, the decade was marked by a severe economic depression sparked by the Panic of 1893. This economic crisis would help bring about the end of the so-called "Gilded Age", and coincided with numerous strikes in the industrial workforce. The economic depression sparked a political struggle over free silver and the collapse of the Third Party System. Concurrently in Australia, a banking crisis occurred, caused by the collapse of a speculative boom in the Australian property market. First-wave feminism made a significant breakthrough as a successful petition in 1893 resulted in New Zealand becoming the first country to grant women the right to vote.

From 1889 to 1890, a worldwide respiratory viral pandemic took place, resulting in 300–900 million infections and 1 million deaths. The pandemic is presumed to have originated in the central Asian city of Bukhara. Furthermore, in this decade, an epizootic of the rinderpest virus struck Africa, considered to be "the most devastating epidemic to hit southern Africa in the late nineteenth century". It killed more than 5.2 million cattle south of the Zambezi, as well as domestic oxen, sheep, and goats, and wild populations of buffalo, giraffe, and wildebeest. This led to starvation resulting in the death of an estimated third of the human population of Ethiopia and two-thirds of the Maasai people of Tanzania. In 1891−1892, poor weather alongside government mismanagement in Russia led to a famine, causing 375,000 to 400,000 deaths. British India suffered two famines this decade, first from 1896 to 1897 and then from 1899 to 1900, due to drought and British policies. Famines also took place in Cuba and China. Major earthquakes of this decade include the 1891 Mino–Owari earthquake (7,273 deaths), the 1893 Quchan earthquake (18,000 casualties), and the 1896 Sanriku earthquake (22,066 people dead or missing).

The first international Olympic Games in modern history were held in Athens in 1896, with 241 athletes from across 14 nations competing. In the United States, the best-selling books of this decade (by year) were Beside the Bonnie Brier Bush (a collection of short stories, best-seller in 1895), Tom Grogan (a drama novel, best-seller in 1896), Quo Vadis (a historical novel, best-seller in 1897), Caleb West (best-seller in 1898), and David Harum (best-seller in 1898). The film industry, still in its infancy, continued to produce short films such as Le Coucher de la Mariée and The Kiss. Songs of this decade include "America the Beautiful", "Daisy Bell" and "Hello! Ma Baby".

In this decade, the world population grew from approximately 1.5 billion to 1.6 billion. The last living person from this decade, Emma Morano, died on April 15, 2017. The last living man from this decade, Jiroemon Kimura, died on June 12, 2013.

== Politics and wars ==
=== Colonization ===
Harbin founded as a Russian city within Manchuria to serve as the center of construction and the main junction and administration center of the Russian-built Chinese Eastern Railway. The location for the city was largely chosen strategically to cross the Songhua River, a tributary of the Amur, and the largest river in Manchuria.

=== Wars ===
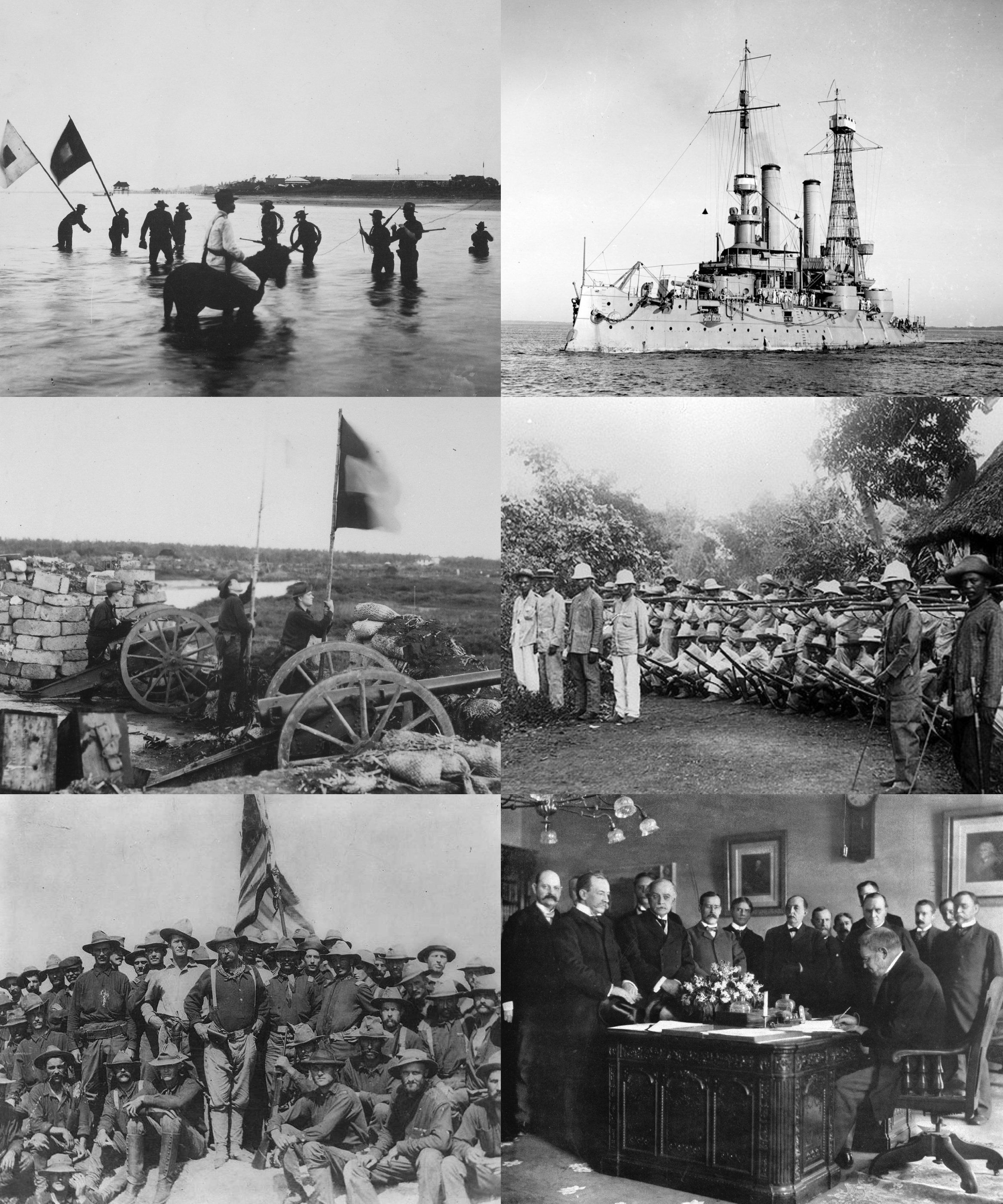
Spanish–American War

- First Franco-Dahomean War (1890)
- Second Franco-Dahomean War (1892–1894)
- First Sino-Japanese War (1894–1895)
- First Italo-Ethiopian War (1895–1896)
- Greco-Turkish War (1897)
- Spanish–American War (1898)
- Philippine–American War (1899–1902)
- Second Boer War (1899–1902)

=== Local conflicts ===
The Wounded Knee Massacre in South Dakota on December 29, 1890, when 365 troops of the US 7th Cavalry, supported by four Hotchkiss guns, surrounded an encampment of Miniconjou (Lakota) and Hunkpapa Sioux (Lakota) near Wounded Knee Creek, South Dakota. The Army had orders to escort the Sioux to the railroad for transport to Omaha, Nebraska. One day earlier, the Sioux had been cornered and agreed to turn themselves in at the Pine Ridge Agency in South Dakota. They were the last of the Sioux to do so. In the process of disarming the Sioux, a deaf tribesman named Black Coyote could not hear the order to give up his rifle and was reluctant to do so. A scuffle over Black Coyote's rifle escalated into an all-out battle, with those few Sioux warriors who still had weapons shooting at the 7th Cavalry, and the 7th Cavalry opening fire indiscriminately from all sides, killing men, women, and children, as well as some of their own fellow troopers. The 7th Cavalry quickly suppressed the Sioux fire, and the surviving Sioux fled, but US cavalrymen pursued and killed many who were unarmed. By the time it was over, about 146 men, women, and children of the Lakota Sioux had been killed. Twenty-five troopers also died, some believed to have been the victims of friendly fire as the shooting took place at point-blank range in chaotic conditions. Around 150 Lakota are believed to have fled the chaos, with an unknown number later dying from hypothermia. The incident is noteworthy as the engagement in military history in which the most Medals of Honor have been awarded in the military history of the United States. This was the last tribe to be invaded which broke the backbone of the American Indian Wars and the American Frontier.

In 1891 the Chilean Civil War was fought from January to September. José Manuel Balmaceda, President of Chile, and the Chilean Army loyal to him face Jorge Montt's Junta. The latter was formed by an alliance between the National Congress of Chile and the Chilean Navy.

In 1892 the Johnson County War occurred in Wyoming. Actually this range war took place in April 1892 in Johnson County, Natrona County and Converse County. The combatants were the Wyoming Stock Growers Association (the WSGA) and the Northern Wyoming Farmers and Stock Growers' Association (NWFSGA). WSGA was an older organization, comprising some of the state's wealthiest and most popular residents. It held a great deal of political sway in the state and region. A primary function of the WSGA was to organize the cattle industry by scheduling roundups and cattle shipments. The NWFSGAA was a group of smaller Johnson County ranchers led by a local settler named Nate Champion. They had recently formed their organization in order to compete with the WSGA. The WSGA "blacklisted" the NWFSGA and told them to stop all operations, but the NWFSGA refused the powerful WSGA's orders to disband and instead made public their plans to hold their own roundup in the spring of 1892. The WSGA, under the direction of Frank Wolcott (WSGA Member and large North Platte rancher), hired a group of skilled gunmen with the intention of eliminating alleged rustlers in Johnson County and break up the NWFSGA. Twenty three gunmen from the Paris, Texas, region and four cattle detectives from the WSGA were hired, as well as Idaho frontiersman George Dunning who would later turn against the group. A cadre of WSGA and Wyoming dignitaries also joined the expedition, including State Senator Bob Tisdale, state water commissioner W. J. Clarke, as well as W. C. Irvine and Hubert Teshemacher, both instrumental in organizing Wyoming's statehood four years earlier. They were also accompanied by surgeon Charles Penrose, who served as the group's doctor, as well as Asa Mercer, the editor of the WSGA's newspaper, and a newspaper reporter for the Chicago Herald, Sam T. Clover, whose lurid first-hand accounts later appeared in the eastern newspapers.

In 1893 the Leper War on Kauaʻi took place on the island of Kauai. The Provisional Government of Hawaii under Sanford B. Dole passes a law which would forcibly relocate lepers to the Leprosy Colony of Kalawao on the Kalaupapa peninsula. When Kaluaikoolau, a leper, resisted arrest by a deputy sheriff and killed the man, Dole reacted by sending armed militia against the lepers of Kalalau Valley. Kaluaikoolau reportedly foiled or killed some of his pursuers. But the conflict ended with the evacuation of the area in July 1893. The main source for the event is a 1906 publication by Kahikina Kelekona (John Sheldon), preserving the story as told by Piilani, Kaluaikoolau's widow.

During the span of 1893–1894 the Enid-Pond Creek Railroad War was fought in the Oklahoma Territory. It was effectively a county seat war. The Rock Island Railroad Company had invested in the townships of Enid and Pond Creek following an announcement by the United States Department of the Interior that the two would become county seats. The Department of the Interior decided to create an Enid and Pond Creek at another location, free of company influence. Resulting in two Enids and two Pond Creeks vying for becoming county seats, starting in September 1893. Rock Island refused to have its trains stop at "Government Enid". They would pass by without taking passengers. Frustrated Enid residents "turned to acts of violence". Some were regularly shooting at the trains. Others were damaging trestles and rail tracks, setting up train accidents. Only government intervention stopped the conflict in September 1894.

During 1893–1897 the War of Canudos arose, a conflict between the state of Brazil and a group of some 30,000 settlers under Antônio Conselheiro who had founded their own community in the northeastern state of Bahia, named Canudos. After a number of unsuccessful attempts at military suppression, it came to a brutal end in October 1897, when a large Brazilian army force overran the village and killed most of the inhabitants. The conflict started with Conselheiro and his jagunços (landless peasants) of this "remote and arid" area protesting against the payment of taxes to the distant government of Rio de Janeiro. They founded their own self-sufficient village, soon joined by others in search of a "Promised Land". By 1895, they refused requests by Rodrigues Lima, Governor of Bahia and Jeronimo Thome da Silva, Archbishop of São Salvador da Bahia to start obeying the laws of the Brazilian state and the rules of the Catholic Church. In 1896, a military expedition under Lieutenant Manuel da Silva Pires Ferreira was sent to pacify them. It was instead attacked, defeated and forced to retreat. Increasingly stronger military forces were sent against Canudos, only to meet with fierce resistance and suffering heavy casualties. In October 1897, Canudos finally fell to the Brazilian military forces. "Those jagunços who were not killed in combat were taken prisoner and summarily executed (by beheading) by the army".

In 1894 the Donghak Peasant Revolution in Joseon Korea came to pass. The uprising started in Gobu during February 1894, with the peasant class protesting against the political corruption of local government officials. The revolution was named after Donghak, a Korean religion stressing "the equality of all human beings". The forces of Emperor Gojong failed in their attempt to suppress the revolt, with initial skirmishes giving way to major conflicts. The Korean government requested assistance from the Empire of Japan. Japanese troops, armed with "rifles and artillery", managed to suppress the revolution. With Korea being a tributary state to Qing Dynasty China, the Japanese military presence was seen as a provocation. The resulting conflict over dominance of Korea would become the First Sino-Japanese War. In part, the government of Emperor Meiji was acting to prevent expansion by the Russian Empire or any other great power towards Korea. Viewing such an expansion as a direct threat to Japanese national security.

During 1895, the Doukhobors, a pacifist Christian sect of the Russian Empire, attempt to resist a number of laws and regulations forced on them by the Russian government. They are mostly active in the South Caucasus, where universal military conscription was introduced in 1887 and was still controversial. They also refuse to swear an oath of allegiance to Nicholas II, the new Russian Emperor. Under further instructions from their exiled leader Peter Vasilevich Verigin, as a sign of absolute pacifism, the Doukhobors of the three Governorates of Transcaucasia made the decision to destroy their weapons. As the Doukhobors assembled to burn them on the night of June 28/29 (July 10/11, Gregorian calendar) 1895, with the singing of psalms and spiritual songs, arrests and beatings by government Cossacks followed. Soon, Cossacks were billeted in many of the Large Party Doukhobors' villages, and over 4,000 of their original residents were dispersed through villages in other parts of Georgia. Many of those died of starvation and exposure.

1896–1898 was when Philippine Revolution occurred. The Philippines, part of the Spanish East Indies, attempt to secede from the Spanish Empire. The Philippine Revolution began in August 1896, upon the discovery of the anti-colonial secret organization Katipunan by the Spanish authorities. The Katipunan, led by Andrés Bonifacio, was a secessionist movement and shadow government spread throughout much of the islands whose goal was independence from Spain through armed revolt. In a mass gathering in Caloocan, the Katipunan leaders organized themselves into a revolutionary government and openly declared a nationwide armed revolution. Bonifacio called for a simultaneous coordinated attack on the capital Manila. This attack failed, but the surrounding provinces also rose up in revolt. In particular, rebels in Cavite led by Emilio Aguinaldo won early victories. A power struggle among the revolutionaries led to Bonifacio's execution in 1897, with command shifting to Aguinaldo who led his own revolutionary government. That year, a truce was officially reached with the Pact of Biak-na-Bato and Aguinaldo was exiled to Hong Kong, though hostilities between rebels and the Spanish government never actually ceased. In 1898, with the outbreak of the Spanish–American War, Aguinaldo unofficially allied with the United States, returned to the Philippines and resumed hostilities against the Spaniards. By June, the rebels had conquered nearly all Spanish-held ground within the Philippines with the exception of Manila. Aguinaldo thus declared independence from Spain and the First Philippine Republic was established. However, neither Spain nor the United States recognized Philippine independence. Spanish rule in the islands only officially ended with the 1898 Treaty of Paris, wherein Spain ceded the Philippines and other territories to the United States. The Philippine–American War broke out shortly afterward.

In 1897 the Lattimer massacre happened. The violent deaths of 19 unarmed striking immigrant anthracite coal miners at the Lattimer mine near Hazleton, Pennsylvania, on September 10, 1897. The miners, mostly of Polish, Slovak, and Lithuanian ethnicity, were shot and killed by a Luzerne County sheriff's posse. Scores more workers were wounded. The Lattimer massacre was a turning point in the history of the United Mine Workers (UMW).

In 1898 the Bava Beccaris massacre in Milan, Kingdom of Italy came about, killing and injuring hundreds. On May 5, 1898, workers organized a strike to demonstrate against the government of Antonio Starabba, Marchese di Rudinì, Prime Minister of Italy, holding it responsible for the general increase of prices and for the famine that was affecting the country. The first blood was shed that day at Pavia, when the son of the mayor of Milan was killed while attempting to halt the troops marching against the crowd. After a protest in Milan the following day, the government declared a state of siege in the city. Infantry, cavalry and artillery were brought into the city and General Fiorenzo Bava Beccaris ordered his troops to fire on demonstrators. According to the government, there were 118 dead and 450 wounded. The opposition claimed 400 dead and more than 2,000 injured people. Filippo Turati, one of the founders of the Italian Socialist Party, was arrested and accused of inspiring the riots.

During 1898 the Voulet–Chanoine Mission became a disastrous French military expedition sent out from Senegal to conquer the Chad Basin and unify all French territories in West Africa. The expedition descended into wanton violence against the local population and ended in sedition on the part of the commanders.

In 1898, the Battle of Sugar Point takes place in the northeast shore of Leech Lake, Minnesota. "Old Bug" (Bugonaygeshig), a leading member of the Pillager Band of Chippewa Indians in Bear Island had been arrested in September 1898. A reported number of 22 Pillagers helped him escape. Arrest warrants were issued for all Pillagers involved in the incident. On October 5, 1898, about 80 men serving or attached to the 3rd U.S. Infantry Regiment arrived on Bear Island to perform the arrests. Finding it abandoned, they proceeded to Sugar Point. There, a force of 19 Pillagers armed with Winchester rifle was observing the soldiers from a forested area. When a soldier fired his weapon, allegedly a new recruit who had done so accidentally, the Pillagers returned fire. Major Melville Wilkinson, the commanding officer, was shot three times and killed. By the end of the conflict, seven soldiers had been killed (including Wilkinson), another 16 wounded. There were no casualties among the 19 Natives. Peaceful relations were soon re-established but this uprising was among the last Native American victories in the American Indian Wars. It is known as "the last Indian Uprising in the United States".

=== Prominent political events ===
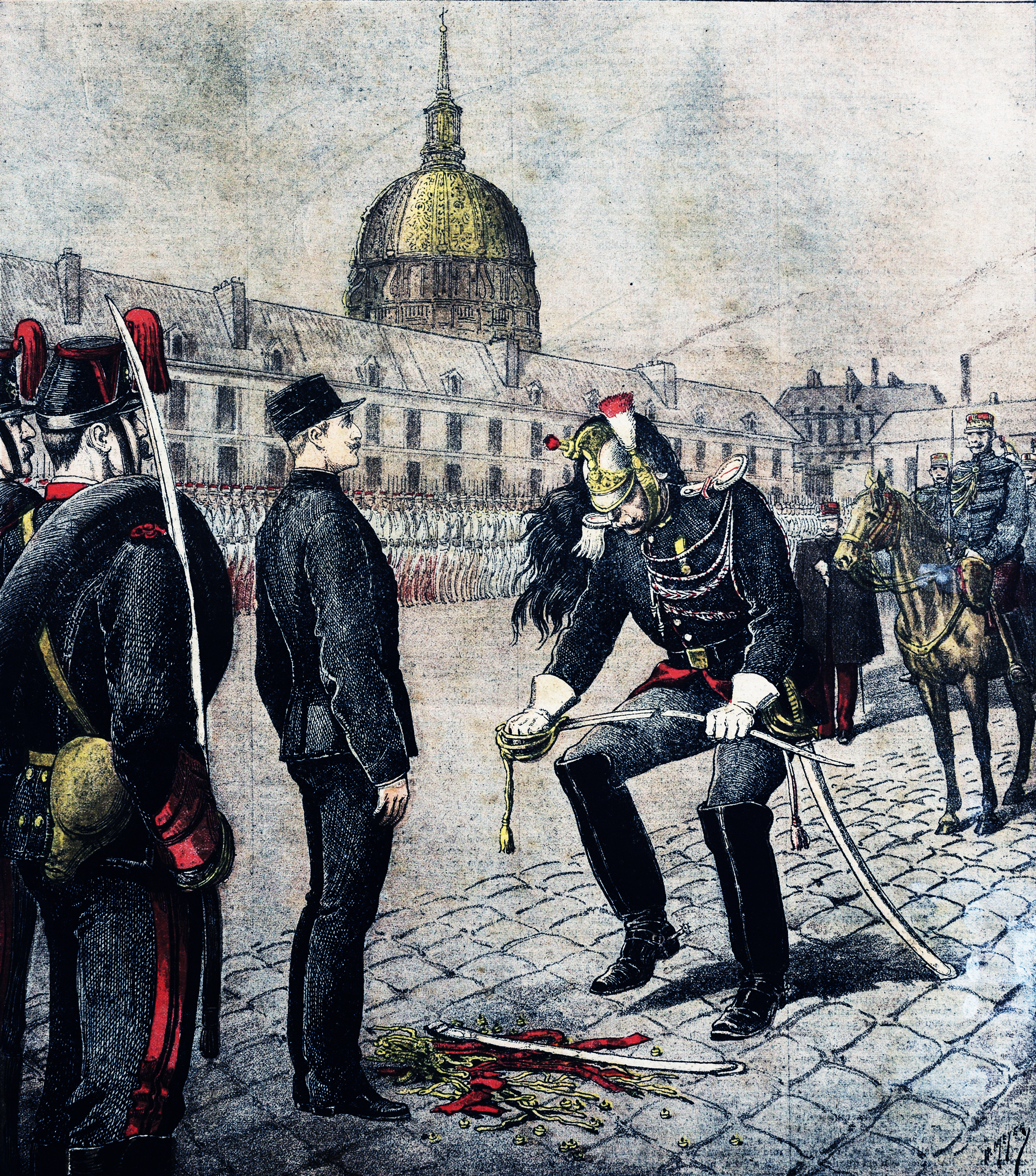
Dreyfus affair – Alfred Dreyfus being dishonorably discharged, 5 January 1895.

- 1890: A split erupted in Irish nationalism over a scandal involving the Irish leader Charles Stewart Parnell's affair with a fellow MP's wife, Katharine O'Shea.
- 1890: The Revolution of the Park - a failed uprising in Argentina, against the government of Miguel Juárez Celman, which forced Celman's resignation and marked the decline of the historical period known as the Generation of '80.
- 1893: New Zealand becomes the first country to grant women the vote.
- 1894: The Greenwich Observatory bomb attack. This was possibly the first widely publicised terrorist incident in Britain.
- The Dreyfus affair – a political scandal that divided France in the 1890s and the early 20th century. It involved the conviction for treason in November 1894 of Captain Alfred Dreyfus, a young French artillery officer of Alsatian Jewish descent.
- 1895: The Gongche Shangshu movement. In April, over 1300 Jǔrén, present in Beijing to participate in the imperial examination, sign a petition requesting reforms by the Guangxu Emperor. Kang Youwei is the main organizer of the movement. In May, thousands of Beijing scholars and citizens protested against the Treaty of Shimonoseki. The emperor would respond with the Hundred Days' Reform of 1898.
- Venezuelan crisis of 1895: It is resolved by the Paris Arbitration Award of 1899 by which much of the disputed territory is awarded to British Guiana instead of Venezuela.
- 1896 Republican Realignment
- The 1896 Cross of Gold speech by William Jennings Bryan
- In June 1897: The Diamond Jubilee of Queen Victoria was celebrated marking Queen Victoria's 60-year reign. Celebrations to honour the grand occasion — the first Diamond Jubilee of any British monarch — showcased the Queen's role as 'mother' of the British Empire and its Dominions.
- 1899:
- The New Imperialism
- The Populist Party reaches its high point in American history.

== Economics in the United States ==
- 1892: The Homestead strike in Homestead, Pennsylvania. Labor dispute between the Amalgamated Association of Iron and Steel Workers (the AA) and the Carnegie Steel Company starting in June 1892. The union negotiated national uniform wage scales on an annual basis; helped regularize working hours, workload levels and work speeds; and helped improve working conditions. It also acted as a hiring hall, helping employers find scarce puddlers and rollers. With the collective bargaining agreement due to expire on June 30, 1892, Henry Clay Frick (chairman of the company) and the leaders of the local AA union entered into negotiations in February. With the steel industry doing well and prices higher, the AA asked for a wage increase. Frick immediately countered with a 22% wage decrease that would affect nearly half the union's membership and remove a number of positions from the bargaining unit. Andrew Carnegie encouraged Frick to use the negotiations to break the union: "...the Firm has decided that the minority must give way to the majority. These works, therefore, will be necessarily non-union after the expiration of the present agreement." Frick locked workers out of the plate mill and one of the open-hearth furnaces on the evening of June 28. When no collective bargaining agreement was reached on June 29, Frick locked the union out of the rest of the plant. A high fence topped with barbed wire, begun in January, was completed and the plant sealed to the workers. Sniper towers with searchlights were constructed near each mill building, and high-pressure water cannons (some capable of spraying boiling-hot liquid) were placed at each entrance. Various aspects of the plant were protected, reinforced or shielded.
- 1892: Buffalo switchmen's strike in Buffalo, New York, during August, 1892. In early 1892, the New York State Legislature passed a law mandating a 10-hour work-day and increases in the day- and night-time minimum wage. On August 12, switchmen in the Buffalo railyards struck the Lehigh Valley Railroad, the Erie Railroad and the Buffalo Creek Railroad after the companies refused to obey the new law. On August 15, Democratic Governor Roswell P. Flower called out the New York State Guard to restore order and protect the railroads' property. However, State Guard Brigadier General Peter C. Doyle, commanding the Fourth Brigade, held a full-time position as an agent of the Lehigh Valley Railroad and was determined to crush the strike.
- 1892: New Orleans general strike taking place in New Orleans, Louisiana, during November, 1892. 49 labor unions affiliated through the American Federation of Labor (AFL) had established a central labor council known as the Workingmen's Amalgamated Council that represented more than 20,000 workers. Three racially integrated unions—the Teamsters, the Scalesmen, and the Packers—made up what came to be called the "Triple Alliance." Many of the workers belonging to the unions of the Triple Alliance were African American. The Triple Alliance started negotiations with the New Orleans Board of Trade in October. Employers utilized race-based appeals to try to divide the workers and turn the public against the strikers. The board of trade announced it would sign contracts agreeing to the terms—but only with the white-dominated Scalesmen and Packers unions. The Board of Trade refused to sign any contract with the black-dominated Teamsters. The Board of Trade and the city's newspapers also began a campaign designed to create public hysteria. The newspapers ran lurid accounts of "mobs of brutal Negro strikers" rampaging through the streets, of African American unionists "beating up all who attempted to interfere with them," and repeated accounts of crowds of blacks assaulting lone white men and women. The striking workers refused to break ranks along racial lines. Large majorities of the Scalesmen and Packers unions passed resolutions affirming their commitment to stay out until the employers had signed a contract with the Teamsters on the same terms offered to other unions. The Board of Trade's tactics essentially backfired when the Workingmen's Amalgamated Council called for a general strike, involving all of its unions. The city's supply of natural gas failed on November 8, as did the electrical grid, and the city was plunged into darkness. The delivery of food and beverages immediately ceased, generating alarm among city residents. Construction, printing, street cleaning, manufacturing and even fire-fighting services ground to a halt.
- 1893: The Panic of 1893 set off a widespread economic depression in the United States of America that lasts until 1897. One of the first signs of trouble was the bankruptcy of the Philadelphia and Reading Railroad, which had greatly over-extended itself, on February 23, 1893, ten days before Grover Cleveland's second inauguration. Some historians consider this bankruptcy to be the beginning of the Panic. As concern of the state of the economy worsened, people rushed to withdraw their money from banks and caused bank runs. The credit crunch rippled through the economy. A financial panic in the United Kingdom and a drop in trade in Europe caused foreign investors to sell American stocks to obtain American funds backed by gold. People attempted to redeem silver notes for gold; ultimately the statutory limit for the minimum amount of gold in federal reserves was reached and US notes could no longer be successfully redeemed for gold. Investments during the time of the Panic were heavily financed through bond issues with high interest payments. The National Cordage Company (the most actively traded stock at the time) went into receivership as a result of its bankers calling their loans in response to rumors regarding the NCC's financial distress. As the demand for silver and silver notes fell, the price and value of silver dropped. Holders worried about a loss of face value of bonds, and many became worthless. A series of bank failures followed, and the Northern Pacific Railway, the Union Pacific Railroad and the Atchison, Topeka & Santa Fe Railroad failed. This was followed by the bankruptcy of many other companies; in total over 15,000 companies and 500 banks failed (many in the west). According to high estimates, about 17%–19% of the workforce was unemployed at the Panic's peak. The huge spike in unemployment, combined with the loss of life savings by failed banks, meant that a once-secure middle-class could not meet their mortgage obligations. As a result, many walked away from recently built homes. From this, the sight of the vacant Victorian (haunted) house entered the American mindset.
- 1894: Cripple Creek miners' strike, a five-month strike by the Western Federation of Miners (WFM) in Cripple Creek, Colorado, United States. In January 1894, Cripple Creek mine owners J. J. Hagerman, David Moffat and Eben Smith, who together employed one-third of the area's miners, announced a lengthening of the work-day to ten hours (from eight), with no change to the daily wage of $3.00 per day. When workers protested, the owners agreed to employ the miners for eight hours a day – but at a wage of only $2.50. Not long before this dispute, miners at Cripple Creek had formed the Free Coinage Union. Once the new changes went into effect, they affiliated with the Western Federation of Miners, and became Local 19. The union was based in Altman, and had chapters in Anaconda, Cripple Creek and Victor. On February 1, 1894, the mine owners began implementing the 10-hour day. Union president John Calderwood issued a notice a week later demanding that the mine owners reinstate the eight-hour day at the $3.00 wage. When the owners did not respond, the nascent union struck on February 7. Portland, Pikes Peak, Gold Dollar and a few smaller mines immediately agreed to the eight-hour day and remained open, but larger mines held out.
- 1894: Coxey's Army a protest march by unemployed workers from the United States, led by the populist Jacob Coxey. The purpose of the march was to protest the unemployment caused by the Panic of 1893 and to lobby for the government to create jobs which would involve building roads and other public works improvements. The march originated with 100 men in Massillon, Ohio, on March 25, 1894, passing through Pittsburgh, Becks Run and Homestead, Pennsylvania, in April.
- 1894: The Bituminous Coal Miners' Strike, an unsuccessful national eight-week strike by miners of hard coal in the United States, which began on April 21, 1894. Initially, the strike was a major success. More than 180,000 miners in Colorado, Illinois, Ohio, Pennsylvania, and West Virginia struck. In Illinois, 25,207 miners went on strike, while only 610 continued to work through the strike, with the average Illinois miner out of work for 72 days because of the strike. In some areas of the country, violence erupted between strikers and mine operators or between striking and non-striking miners. On May 23 near Uniontown, Pennsylvania, 15 guards armed with carbines and machine guns held off an attack by 1500 strikers, killing 5 and wounding 8.
- 1894: May Day Riots, a series of violent demonstrations that occurred throughout Cleveland, Ohio, on May 1, 1894 (May Day). Cleveland's unemployment rate increased dramatically during the Panic of 1893. Finally, riots broke out among the unemployed who condemned city leaders for their ineffective relief measures.
- 1894: The workers of the Pullman Company went on strike in Illinois. During the economic panic of 1893, the Pullman Palace Car Company cut wages as demands for their train cars plummeted and the company's revenue dropped. A delegation of workers complained of the low wages and twelve-hour workdays, and that the corporation that operated the town of Pullman didn't decrease rents, but company owner George Pullman "loftily declined to talk with them." The boycott was launched on June 26, 1894. Within four days, 125,000 workers on twenty-nine railroads had quit work rather than handle Pullman cars. Adding fuel to the fire the railroad companies began hiring replacement workers (that is, strikebreakers), which only increased hostilities. Many African Americans, fearful that the racism expressed by the American Railway Union would lock them out of another labor market, crossed the picket line to break the strike; thus adding a racially charged tone to the conflict.
- 1896: The 1896 United States presidential election becomes a political realignment. The monetary policy standard supported by the candidates of the two major parties arguably dominated their electoral campaigns. William Jennings Bryan, candidate of the ruling Democratic Party campaigned on a policy of Free Silver. His opponent William McKinley of the Republican Party, which had lost elections in 1884 and 1892, campaigned on a policy of Sound Money and maintaining the gold standard in effect since the 1870s. The "shorthand slogans" actually reflected "broader philosophies of finance and public policy, and opposing beliefs about justice, order, and 'moral economy.'", The Republicans won the election and would win every election to 1912. Arguably ending the so-called Gilded Age. The McKinley administration would embrace American imperialism, its involvement in the Spanish–American War (1896–1898) leading the United States in playing a more active role in the world scene. The term Progressive Era has been suggested for the period, though often covering the reforms lasting from the 1880s to the 1920s.

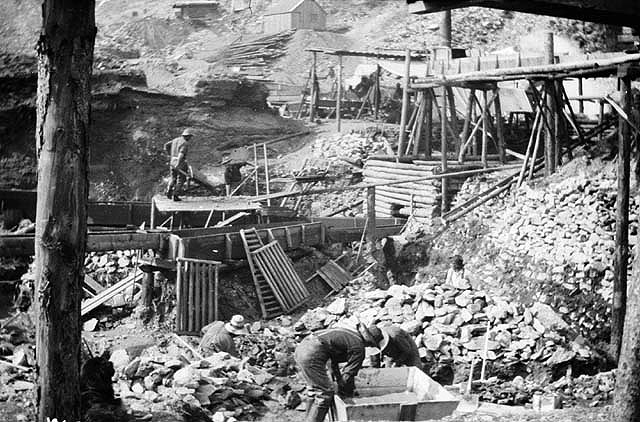
A typical gold mining operation, on Bonanza Creek.

- 1896–1897: Leadville Colorado, Miners' Strike. The union local in the Leadville mining district was the Cloud City Miners' Union (CCMU), Local 33 of the Western Federation of Miners. In 1896, representatives of the CCMU asked for a wage increase of fifty cents per day for all mine workers not already making three dollars per day. The union felt justified, for fifty cents a day had been cut from the miners' wages during the depression of 1893. By 1895, Leadville mines posted their largest combined output since 1889, and Leadville was then Colorado's most productive mine camp, producing almost 9.5 million ounces of silver that year. The mine owners "were doing a lot better than they wanted anyone to know." Negotiations over an increase in pay for the lower-paid mineworkers broke down, and 1,200 miners voted unanimously to strike all mines that were still paying at the lower rate. The next day 968 miners walked out, and mine owners locked out another 1,332 mine workers. The Leadville strike set the scene not only for the WFM's consideration of militant tactics and its embrace of radicalism, but also for the birth of the Western Labor Union (which became the American Labor Union), the WFM's participation in the founding of the Industrial Workers of the World, and for events which culminated in the Colorado Labor Wars.
- 1896–1899: The Klondike Gold Rush. In August, 1896, George Carmack, Kate Carmack, Keish, Dawson Charlie and Patsy Henderson, members of a Tagish First Nations family group, discovered rich placer gold deposits in Bonanza (Rabbit) Creek, Yukon, Canada. Soon a massive movement of people, goods and money started moving towards the Klondike, Yukon region and the nearby District of Alaska. Men from all walks of life headed for the Yukon from as far away as New York, South Africa, the United Kingdom of Great Britain and Ireland, and Australia. Surprisingly, a large proportion were professionals, such as teachers and doctors, even a mayor or two, who gave up respectable careers to make the journey. For instance, the residents of Camp Skagway Number One included: William Howard Taft, who went on to become a U.S. president; Frederick Russell Burnham, the celebrated American scout who arrived from Africa only to be called back to take part in the Second Boer War; and W. W. White, author and explorer. Most were perfectly aware of their chance of finding significant amounts of gold were slim to none, and went for the adventure. As many as half of those who reached Dawson City kept right on going without doing any prospecting at all. Thus, by bringing large numbers of entrepreneurial adventurers to the region, the Gold Rush significantly contributed to the economic development of Western Canada, Alaska, and the Pacific Northwest. New cities were created as a result of the Gold Rush, including among others Dawson City, Fairbanks, Alaska, and Anchorage, Alaska. The heyday of the individual prospector and the rush towards the north ended by 1899. Exploitation of the area by "big mining companies with their mechanical dredges" would last well into the 20th century.
- 1898: Welsh coal strike, involving the colliers of South Wales and Monmouthshire. The strike began as an attempt by the colliers to remove the sliding scale, which determined their wage based on the price of coal. The strike quickly turned into a disastrous lockout which would last for six months and result in a failure for the colliers as the sliding scale stayed in place. The strike officially ended on September 1, 1898. The lack of organisation and vision apparent form the colliers' leaders was addressed by the foundation of the South Wales Miners' Federation, or 'the Fed'.
- 1899: Newsboys Strike in New York City, New York. The newsboys were not employees of the newspapers but rather purchased the papers from the publishers and sold them as independent agents. Not allowed to return unsold papers, the newsboys typically earned around 30 cents a day and often worked until very late at night. Cries of "Extra, extra!" were often heard into the morning hours as newsboys attempted to hawk every last paper. In 1898, with the Spanish–American War increasing newspaper sales, several publishers raised the cost of a newsboy bundle of 100 newspapers from 50¢ to 60¢, a price increase that at the time was offset by the increased sales. After the war, many papers reduced the cost back to previous levels, with the notable exceptions of the New York World and the New York Morning Journal. In July 1899, a large number of New York City newsboys refused to distribute the papers of Joseph Pulitzer, publisher of the World, and William Randolph Hearst, publisher of the Journal. The strikers demonstrated across the Brooklyn Bridge for several days, effectively bringing traffic to a standstill, along with the news distribution for most New England cities. Several rallies drew more than 5,000 newsboys, complete with charismatic speeches by strike leader Kid Blink. Blink and his strikers were the subject of violence, as well. Hearst and Pulitzer hired men to break up rallies and protect the newspaper deliveries still underway.

== Other significant international events ==
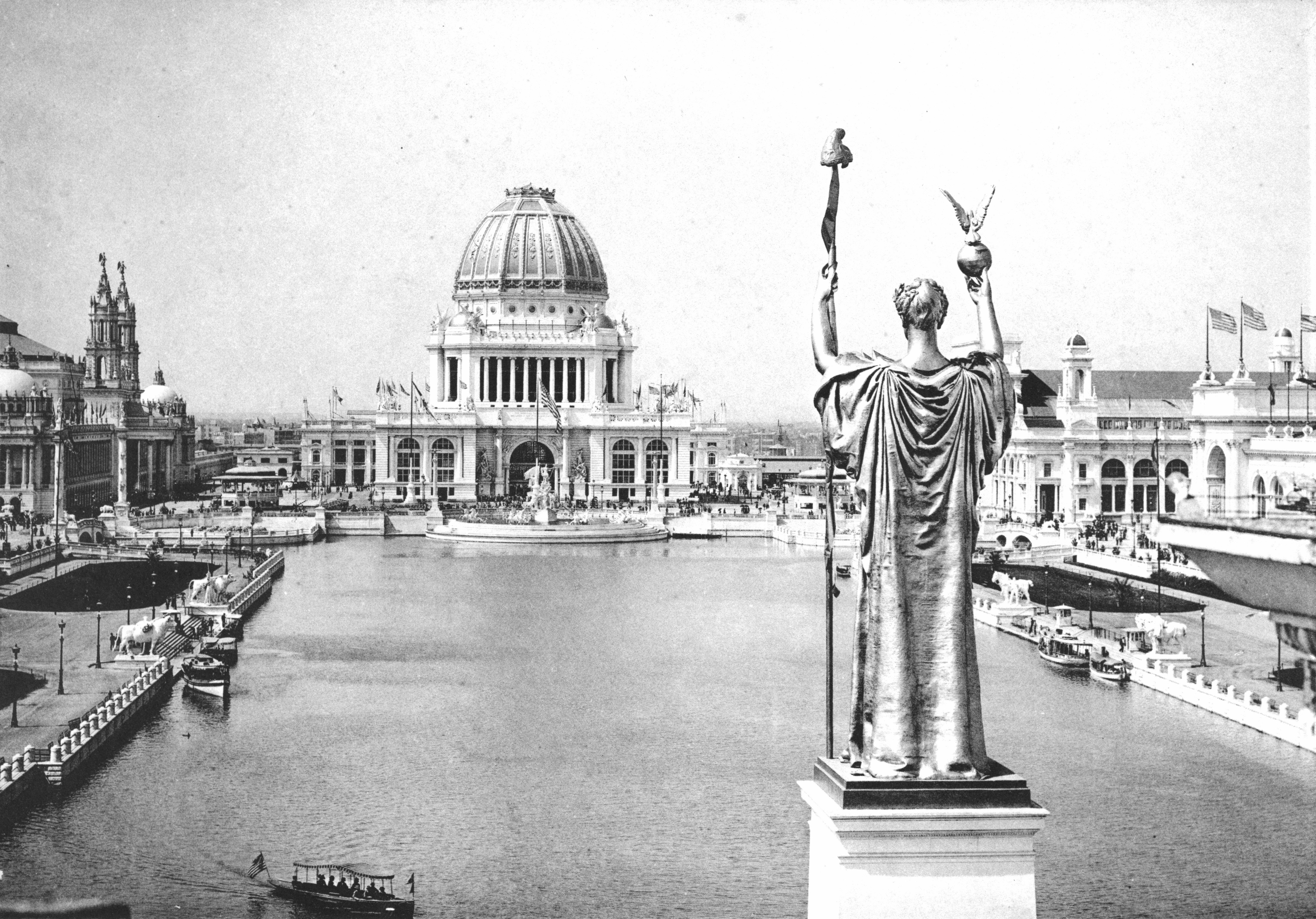
World's Columbian Exposition, 1893

- May 1-October 30, 1893 - The 1893 World's Fair, also known as the World's Columbian Exposition, was held in Chicago, Illinois to celebrate the 400th anniversary of Christopher Columbus's discovery of the New World. The Exposition was an influential social and cultural event and had a profound effect on architecture, sanitation, the arts, Chicago's self-image, and American industrial optimism.

== Science and technology ==
=== Technology ===
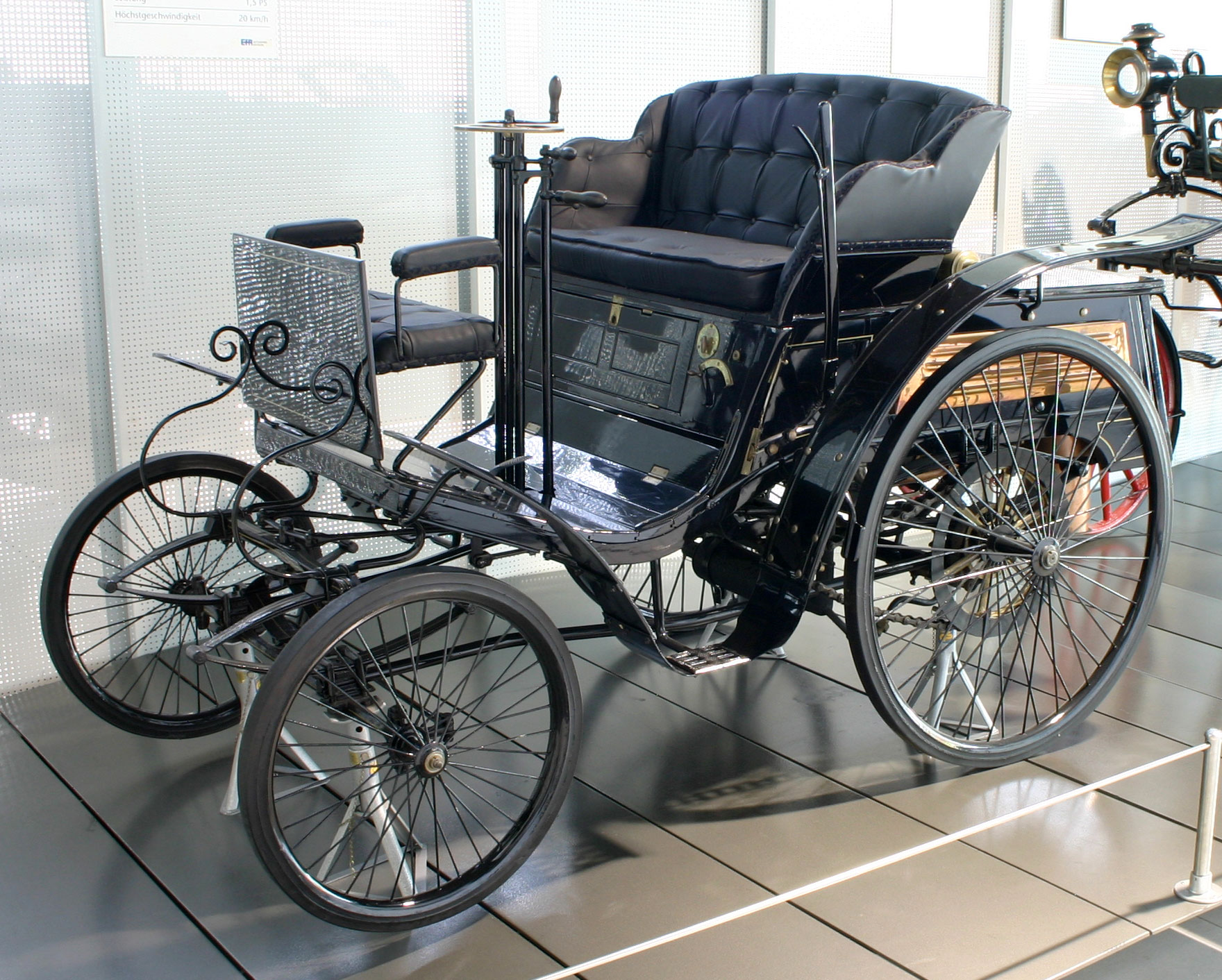
1895 Benz Velo. Along with its contemporary Duryea Motor Wagon, those vehicles were considered the earliest standardized cars. The 1890s also saw further developments in the history of the automobile.

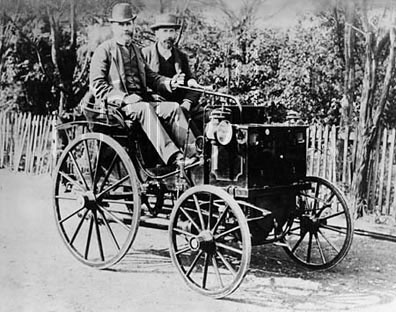
Panhard-Levassor (1890–1895). This model was the first automobile to circulate in Portugal

- 1890s: Bike boom sweeps Europe and America with hundreds of bicycle manufacturers in the biggest bicycle craze to date.
- 1890: Clément Ader of Muret, France creates his Ader Éole. "Ader claimed that while he was aboard the Ader Eole he made a steam-engine powered low-level flight of approximately 160 feet on October 9, 1890, in the suburbs of Paris, from a level field on the estate of a friend." It was a powered and heavier-than-air flight, but is often discounted as a candidate for the first flying machine for two main reasons. "It was not capable of a prolonged flight (due to the use of a steam engine) and it lacked adequate provisions for full flight control.". His Ader Avion II and Ader Avion III had more complex designs but failed to take-off.
- 1891: Commercial production of automobiles began and was at an early stage. The first company formed exclusively to build automobiles was Panhard et Levassor in France, which also introduced the first four-cylinder engine. Panhard was originally called Panhard et Levassor, and was established as a car manufacturing concern by René Panhard, Émile Levassor, and Belgian lawyer Edouard Sarazin in 1887. In 1891, the company built their first all-Lavassor design, a "state of the art" model: the Systeme Panhard consisted of four wheels, a front-mounted engine with rear wheel drive, and a crude sliding-gear transmission, sold at 3500 francs. (It would remain the standard until Cadillac introduced synchromesh in 1928.) This was to become the standard layout for automobiles for most of the next century. The same year, Panhard shared their Daimler engine license with bicycle maker Armand Peugeot, who formed his own car company. In 1895, 1205 cc (74 ci) Panhards finished 1–2 in the Paris–Bordeaux–Paris race, one piloted solo by Levassor, for 48¾hr.
- 1891: Otto Lilienthal of Anklam, Province of Pomerania, Kingdom of Prussia creates his Derwitzer Glider, a glider aircraft. It became "the first successful manned aircraft in the world, covering flight distances of up to about 80 feet near Derwitz/Krielow in Brandenburg." Lilienthal continued creating and testing flying machines to 1896. He achieved international fame. On August 9, 1896, Lilienthal lost control of one of his gliders due to a sudden gust of wind, crashing from a height of about 17 m (56 ft) and suffering severe injuries. He died the following day.
- 1892: Rudolf Diesel of Paris, France discovers the Diesel cycle, a thermodynamic cycle. On February 23, 1893, Diesel received a patent for compression ignition engine which would put his discovery in practical use. Further research would lead to his creation of the Diesel engine, an internal combustion engine. "Diesel originally designed the diesel engine to use peanut oil as a fuel in order to help support agrarian society." It was an early form of biodiesel.
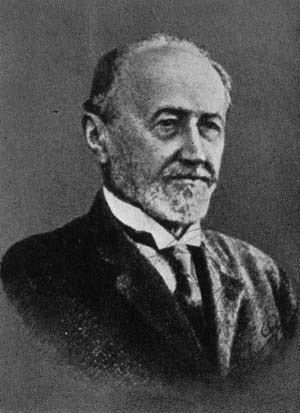
  Juan Vucetich, Argentine police officer and pioneer of dactyloscopy.
- 1892: For the first time a criminal was positively identified through fingerprints in Argentina, due to the pioneering work of Juan Vucetich.
- 1893: The Duryea Motor Wagon Company, founded by siblings Charles Duryea and J. Frank Duryea, arguably becomes the first American automobile firm. In 1893, the Duryea brothers tested their first gasoline-powered automobile model and in 1896 established their company to build the Duryea model automobile, supposedly the first auto ever commercially manufactured. Their 1893 model was a one-cylinder "Ladies Phaeton", first demonstrated on September 21, 1893, at Chicopee, Massachusetts. It is considered the first successful gas-engine vehicle built in the U.S. Their 1895 model, driven by Frank, won the Chicago Times-Herald race in Chicago on a snowy Thanksgiving Day. He travelled 54 miles (87 km) at an average 7.5 mph (12.1 km/h), marking the first U.S. auto race in which any entrants finished. That same year, the brothers began commercial production, with thirteen cars sold by the end of 1896.

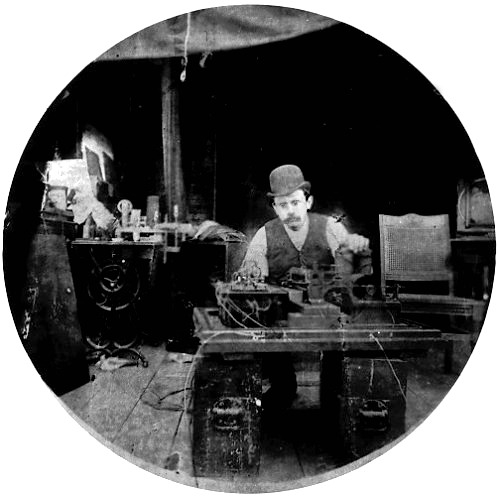
Charles Kayser of the Edison lab seated behind the Kinetograph. Portability was not among the camera's virtues.

- 1893–1894: The Kinetoscope, an early motion picture exhibition device invented by Thomas Edison and developed by William Kennedy Dickson, is introduced to the public. (It was in development since 1889 and a number of films had already been created for it). The premiere of the completed Kinetoscope was held not at the Chicago World's Fair, as originally scheduled, but at the Brooklyn Institute of Arts and Sciences on May 9, 1893. The first film publicly shown on the system was Blacksmith Scene (aka Blacksmiths); directed by Dickson and shot by Heise, it was produced at the new Edison moviemaking studio, known as the Black Maria. Despite extensive promotion, a major display of the Kinetoscope, involving as many as twenty-five machines, never took place at the Chicago exposition. Kinetoscope production had been delayed in part because of Dickson's absence of more than eleven weeks early in the year with a nervous breakdown. On April 14, 1894, a public Kinetoscope parlor was opened by the Holland Bros. in New York City at 1155 Broadway, on the corner of 27th Street—the first commercial motion picture house. The venue had ten machines, set up in parallel rows of five, each showing a different movie. For 25 cents a viewer could see all the films in either row; half a dollar gave access to the entire bill. The machines were purchased from the new Kinetoscope Company, which had contracted with Edison for their production; the firm, headed by Norman C. Raff and Frank R. Gammon, included among its investors Andrew M. Holland, one of the entrepreneurial siblings, and Edison's former business chief, Alfred O. Tate. The ten films that comprise the first commercial movie program, all shot at the Black Maria, were descriptively titled: Barber Shop, Bertoldi (mouth support) (Ena Bertoldi, a British vaudeville contortionist), Bertoldi (table contortion), Blacksmiths, Roosters (some manner of cockfight), Highland Dance, Horse Shoeing, Sandow (Eugen Sandow, a German strongman), Trapeze, and Wrestling. As historian Charles Musser describes, a "profound transformation of American life and performance culture" had begun.
- 1894: Hiram Maxim completes his flying machine and was ready to use it. He built a 145 feet (44 m) long craft that weighed 3.5 tons, with a 110 feet (34 m) wingspan that was powered by two compound 360 horsepower (270 kW) steam engines driving two propellers. In trials at Bexley in 1894 his machine rode on 1800 rails and was prevented from rising by outriggers underneath and wooden safety rails overhead, somewhat in the manner of a roller coaster. His goal in building this machine was not to soar freely, but to test if it would lift off the ground. During its test run all of the outriggers were engaged, showing that it had developed enough lift to take off, but in so doing it damaged the track; the "flight" was aborted in time to prevent disaster. The craft was almost certainly aerodynamically unstable and uncontrollable, which Maxim probably realized, because he subsequently abandoned work on it. "On the Maxim Biplane Test-Rig's third test run, on July 31, 1894, with Maxim and a crew of three aboard, it lifted with such force that it broke the reinforced restraining track and careened for some 200 yards, at times reaching an altitude of 2 or 3 feet above the damaged track. It was believed that a lifting force of some 10,000 pounds had likely been generated."
- 1894: Lawrence Hargrave of Greenwich, England successfully lifted himself off the ground under a train of four of his box kites at Stanwell Park beach, New South Wales, Australia on 12 November 1894. Aided by James Swain, the caretaker at his property, the kite line was moored via a spring balance to two sandbags. Hargrave carried an anemometer and inclinometer aloft to measure windspeed and the angle of the kite line. He rose 16 feet (4.9 m) in a wind speed of 21 mph (34 km/h). This experiment was widely reported and established the box kite as a stable aerial platform
- 1895: Auguste and Louis Lumière of Besançon, Franche-Comté, France introduce cinematograph, a combination film camera, film projector and developer, to the public. Their first public screening of films at which admission was charged was held on December 28, 1895, at Salon Indien du Grand Café in Paris. This history-making presentation featured ten short films, including their first film, Sortie des Usines Lumière à Lyon (Workers Leaving the Lumière Factory).
- 1896: Samuel Langley of Roxbury, Boston, Massachusetts, has two significant breakthroughs while testing his Langley Aerodromes, flying machines. In May, Aerodrome number 5 made "circular flights of 3,300 and 2,300 feet, at a maximum altitude of some 80 to 100 feet and at a speed of some 20 to 25 miles an hour". In November, Aerodrome number 6 "flew 4,200 feet, staying aloft over 1 minute.". The flights were powered (by a steam engine), but unmanned.
- 1896: Octave Chanute and Augustus Moore Herring co-design the Chanute-Herring Biplane. "Each 16-foot (4.9-meter) wing was covered with varnished silk. The pilot hung from two bars that ran down from the upper wings and passed under his arms. This plane was originally flown at Dune Park, Indiana, about sixty miles from Chanute's home in Chicago, as a triplane on August 29, 1896, but was found to be unwieldy. Chanute and Herring removed the lowest of the three wings, which vastly improved its gliding ability. In its flight on September 11, it flew 256 feet (78 meters)." It influenced the design of later aircraft, setting the pattern for a number of years.
- 1897: Carl Richard Nyberg of Arboga, Sweden starts constructing his Flugan, an early fixed-wing aircraft, outside his home in Lidingö. Construction started in 1897, and he kept working on it until 1922. The craft only managed a few short jumps and Nyberg was often ridiculed, however several of his innovations are still in use. He was the first to test his design in a wind tunnel and the first to build a hangar. The reasons for failure include poor wing and propeller design and, allegedly, that he was afraid of heights.
- 1898: Wurlitzer builds the first coin-operated player piano.
- 1899: Gustave Whitehead, according to a witness who gave his report in 1934, made a very early motorized flight of about half a mile in Pittsburgh in April or May 1899. Louis Darvarich, a friend of Whitehead's, said they flew together at a height of 20 to 25 ft (6.1 to 7.6 m) in a steam-powered monoplane aircraft and crashed into a three-story building. Darvarich said he was stoking the boiler and was badly scalded in the accident, requiring several weeks in a hospital. This claim is not accepted by mainstream aviation historians including William F. Trimble.
- 1899: Percy Pilcher of Bath, Somerset dies in October, without having a chance to fly his early triplane. Pilcher had built a hang glider called The Bat which he flew for the first time in 1895. He then built more hang gliders ("The Beetle", "The Gull" and "The Hawk"), but had set his sights upon powered flight, which he hoped to achieve on his triplane. On 30 September 1899, having completed his triplane, he had intended to demonstrate it to a group of onlookers and potential sponsors in a field near Stanford Hall. However, days before, the engine crankshaft had broken and, so as not to disappoint his guests, he decided to fly the Hawk instead. The weather was stormy and rainy, but by 4 pm Pilcher decided the weather was good enough to fly. Whilst flying, the tail snapped and Pilcher plunged 10 metres (33 feet) to the ground: he died two days later from his injuries with his triplane having never been publicly flown. In 2003, a research effort carried out at the School of Aeronautics at Cranfield University, commissioned by the BBC2 television series "Horizon", has shown that Pilcher's design was more or less workable, and had he been able to develop his engine, it is possible he would have succeeded in being the first to fly a heavier-than-air powered aircraft with some degree of control. Cranfield built a replica of Pilcher's aircraft and added the Wright brothers' innovation of wing-warping as a safety backup for roll control. Pilcher's original design did not include aerodynamic controls such as ailerons or elevator. After a very short initial test, the craft achieved a sustained flight of 1 minute and 25 seconds, compared to 59 seconds for the Wright Brothers' best flight at Kitty Hawk. This was achieved under dead calm conditions as an additional safety measure, whereas the Wrights flew in a 25 mph+ wind to achieve enough airspeed on their early attempts.
- 1899: Augustus Moore Herring introduces his biplane glider with a compressed-air engine. On October 11, 1899 (or 1898), Herring flew at Silver Beach Amusement Park in St. Joseph, Michigan. He reportedly covered a distance of 50 feet (15 m). However, there are no known witnesses. On October 22, 1899 (or 1898) Herring took a second flight, covering 73 feet (22 m) in 8 to 10 seconds. This time the flight was covered by a newspaper reporter. It is often discounted as a candidate for the first flying machine for various reasons. The craft was difficult to steer, discounting it as controlled flight. While an aircraft outfitted with an engine, said engine could operate for "only 30 seconds at a time". The design was still recognizably a glider, introducing no innovations in that regard. It was also a "technological dead end", failing to influence the flying machines of the 20th century. It also attracted little press coverage, though possibly because the Michigan press was preoccupied with William McKinley, President of the United States visiting Three Oaks, Michigan, at about the same time.

=== Science ===
- Henri Becquerel discovered radioactivity.
- Swedish scientist Svante Arrhenius and US geologist Thomas Chrowder Chamberlin independently suggested that human CO_{2} emissions might cause global warming.
- 1894: Argon was discovered by Lord Rayleigh and William Ramsay.
- 1895: Helium was discovered to exist on the Earth by William Ramsay, 27 years after first being detected spectrographically on the Sun in 1868.
- 1895: X-rays were discovered by Wilhelm Röntgen.
- 1896: A year after helium's terrestrial discovery, neon, krypton, and xenon were discovered by William Ramsay and Morris Travers.
- 1897: Social scientist Émile Durkheim published the groundbreaking study Suicide.

== Popular culture ==
- Settlement movement based on Jane Addams' Hull House in Chicago.
- Hale Johnson was a major leader of the American temperance movement.
- Department of Scientific Temperance Instruction, under Mary Hunt, achieved de facto control over all alcohol education in the USA.
- The fin de siècle (primarily in Paris and Brussels).

=== Literature and arts ===
First edition cover of The Time Machine (1895)

- Oscar Wilde published The Picture of Dorian Gray in 1890 (revised in 1891).
- Sir Arthur Conan Doyle published the first Sherlock Holmes story in The Strand Magazine in 1891.
- Frank Wedekind releases Spring Awakening in 1891.
- Thomas Hardy published Tess of the d'Urbervilles in 1891.
- Rudyard Kipling published Barrack-Room Ballads in 1892.
- Ángel Della Valle completed The Return of the Malón in 1892.
- Charlotte Perkins Gilman published The Yellow Wallpaper in 1892.
- Ernesto de la Cárcova completed Without Bread and Without Work in 1893.
- Rudyard Kipling published The Jungle Book in 1894.
- Kate Chopin published "The Story of an Hour" in 1894
- George H. Thomas published in 1894 the first illustrated song for "The Little Lost Child".
- H. G. Wells published The Time Machine (1895), The Island of Doctor Moreau (1896), and created modern science fiction with his book The War of the Worlds (1898).
- A. E. Housman published A Shropshire Lad in 1896.
- William James published ‘’The Will to Believe’’ in 1896, laying out the basics of Pragmatism.
- Bram Stoker's Dracula is published by Archibald Constable & co. (UK) in 1897.
- Anton Chekhov published Uncle Vanya in 1899.
- Kate Chopin published The Awakening in 1899.
- Joseph Conrad published Heart of Darkness in 1899.
- Increasing importance of Art Nouveau style.
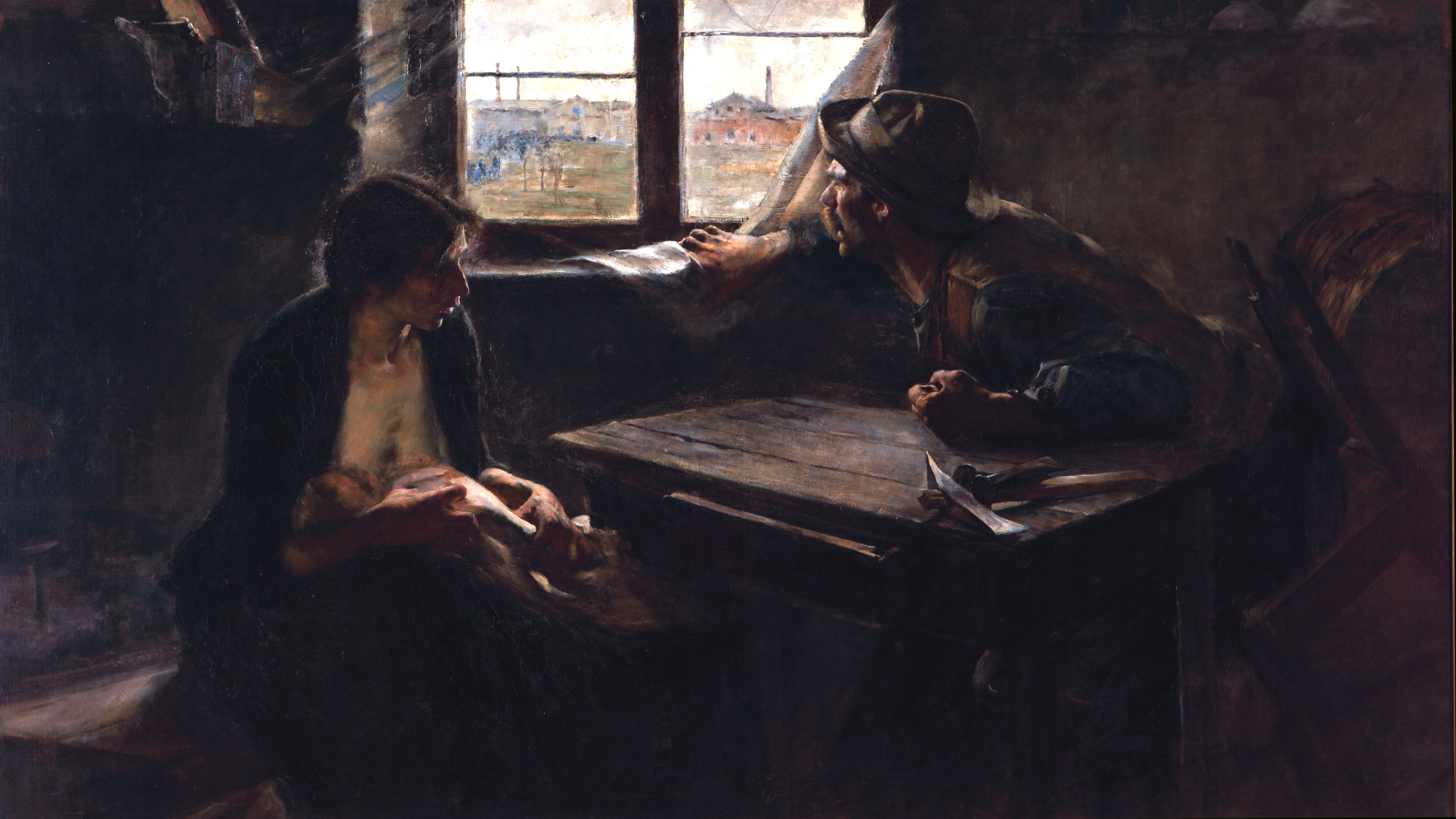
  Without Bread and Without Work by Ernesto de la Cárcova

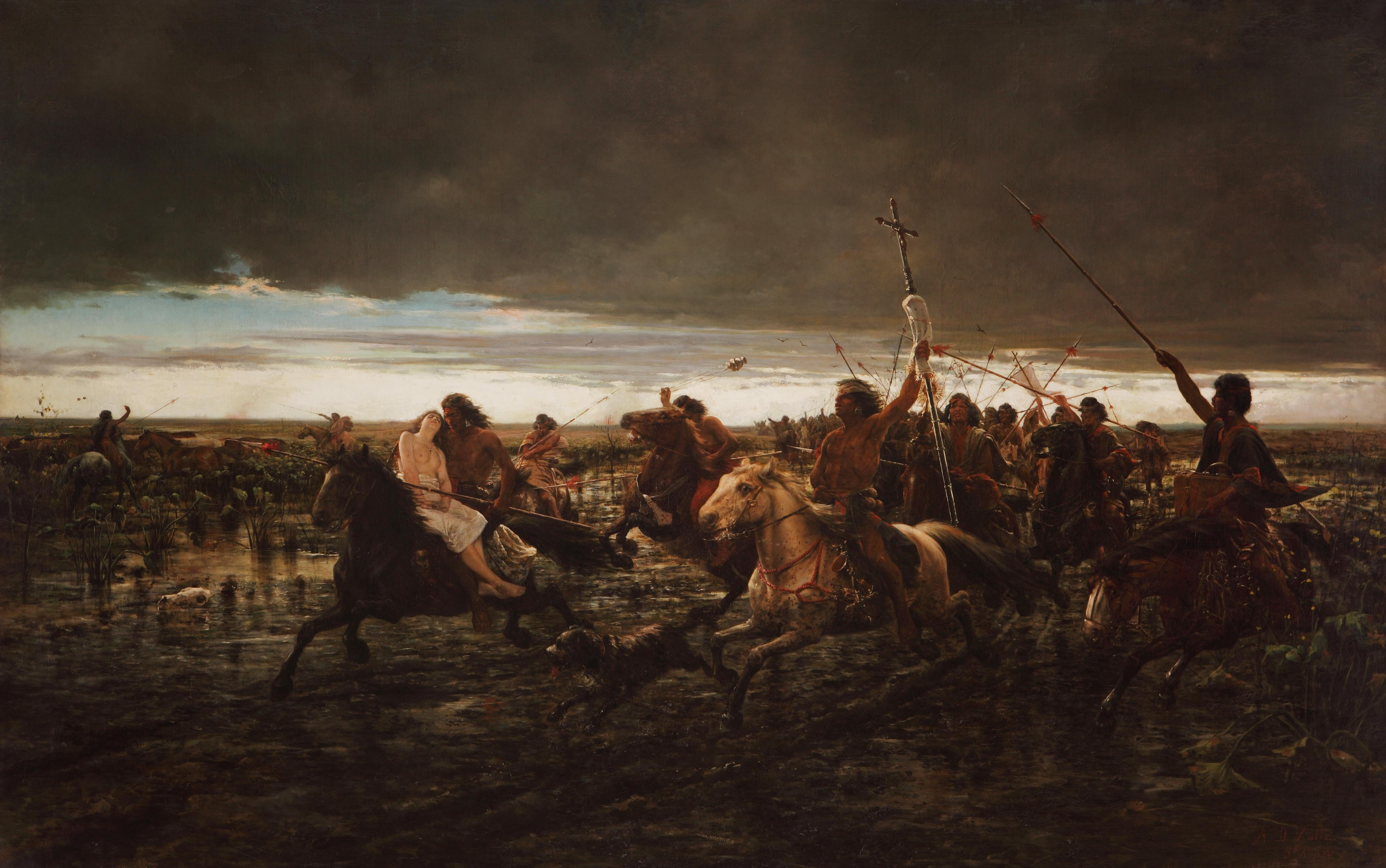
The Return of the Malón by Ángel Della Valle.

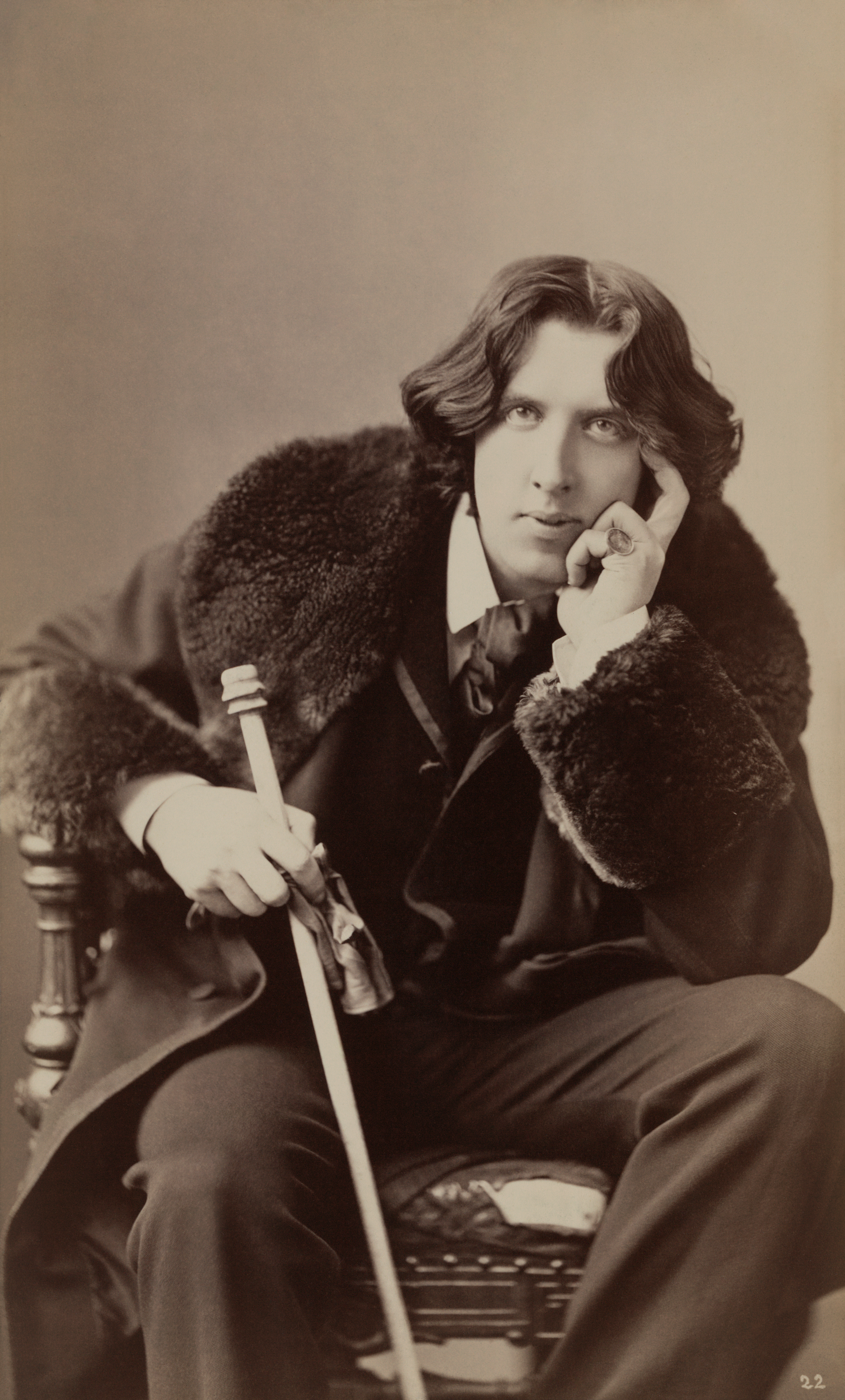
Oscar Wilde

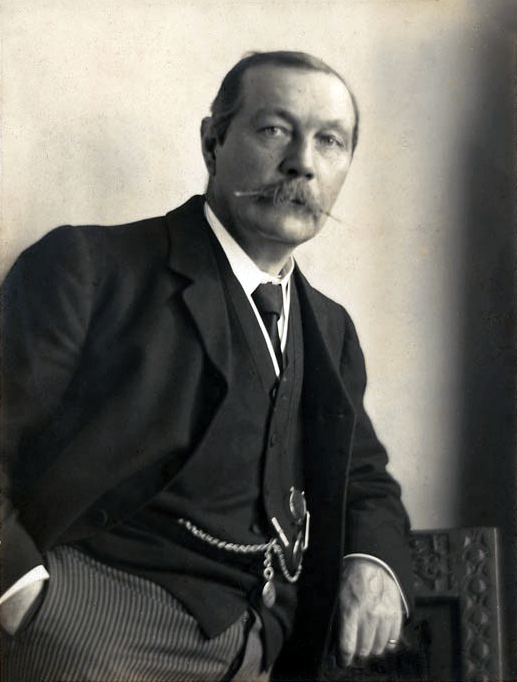
Arthur Conan Doyle

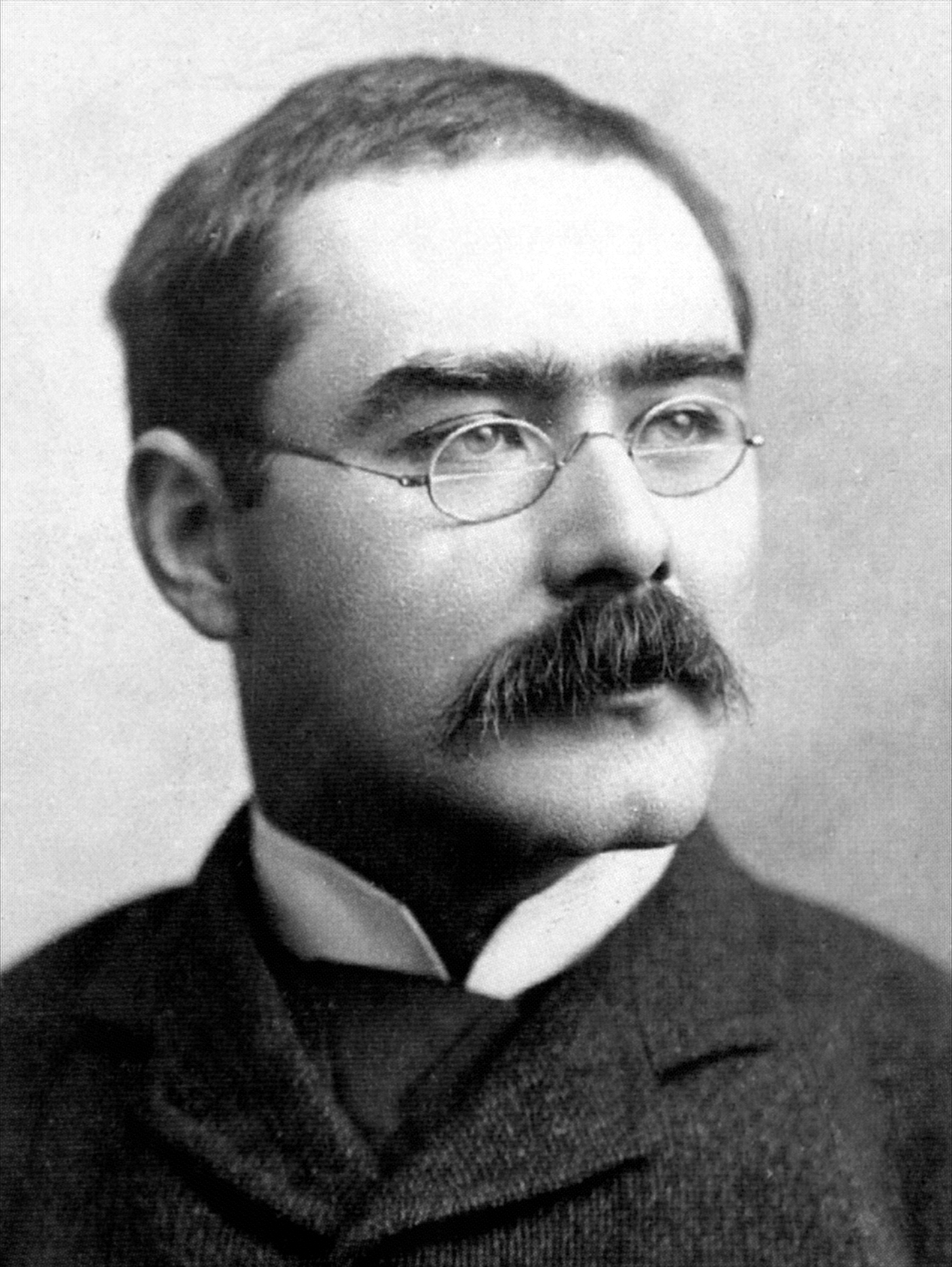
Rudyard Kipling

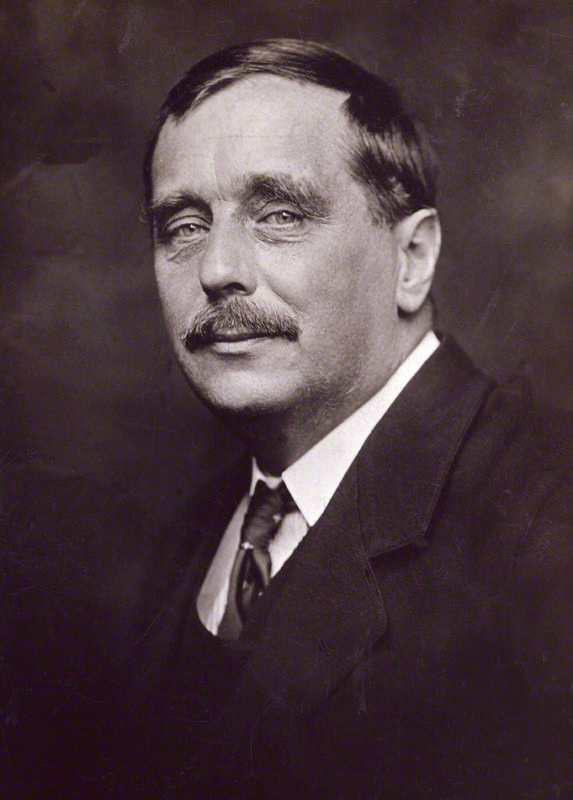
H. G. Wells

Mark Twain

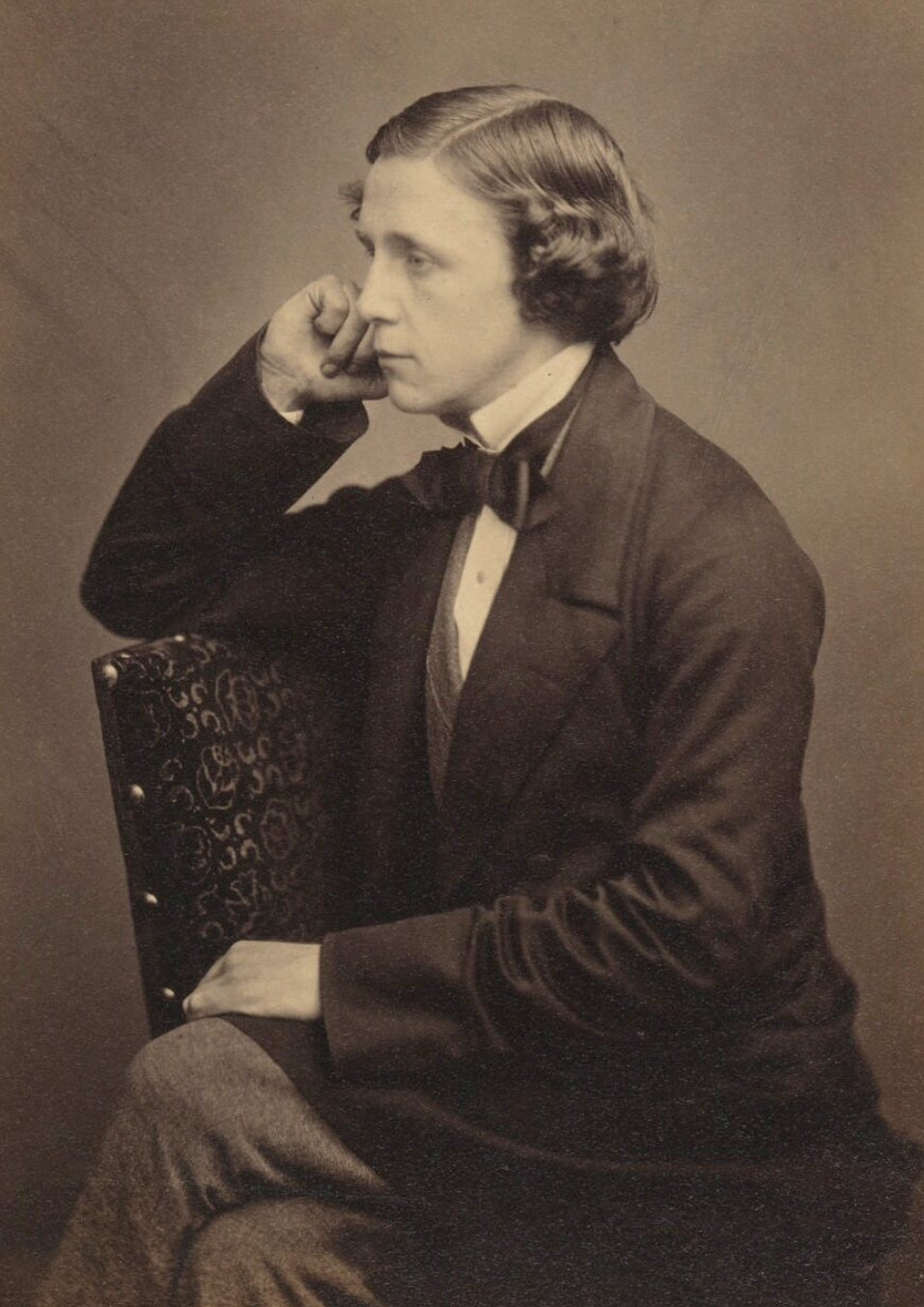
Lewis Carroll

=== Film ===
- For the first time in history, a coronation is filmed. The coronation is of Tsar Nicholas II.

=== Music ===
- Symphony No. 6 (1893) by Pyotr Ilyich Tchaikovsky
- Symphony No. 9 (1893) by Antonín Dvořák
- Also sprach Zarathustra (1896) by Richard Strauss
- Finlandia (1899) by Jean Sibelius
- Ragtime
- Tango
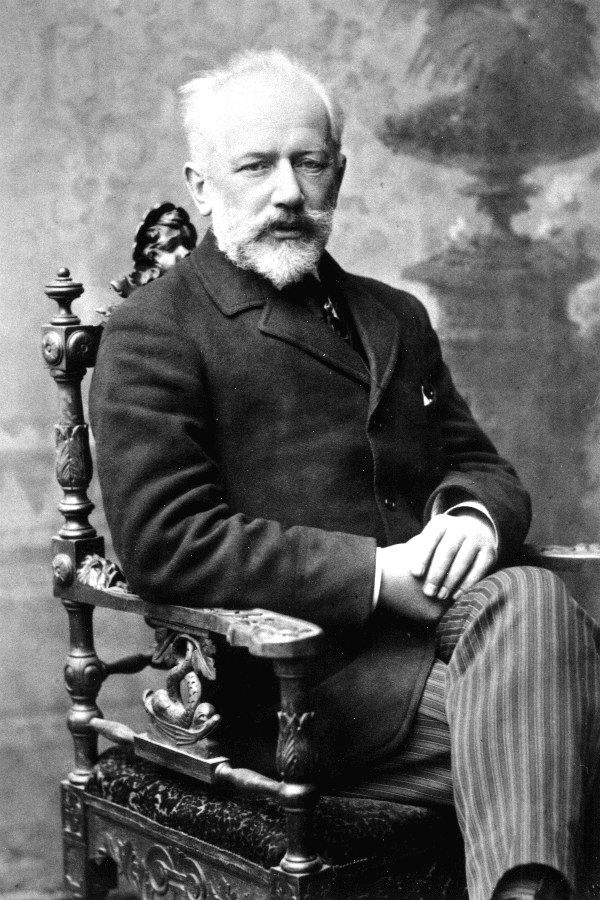
Tchaikovsky

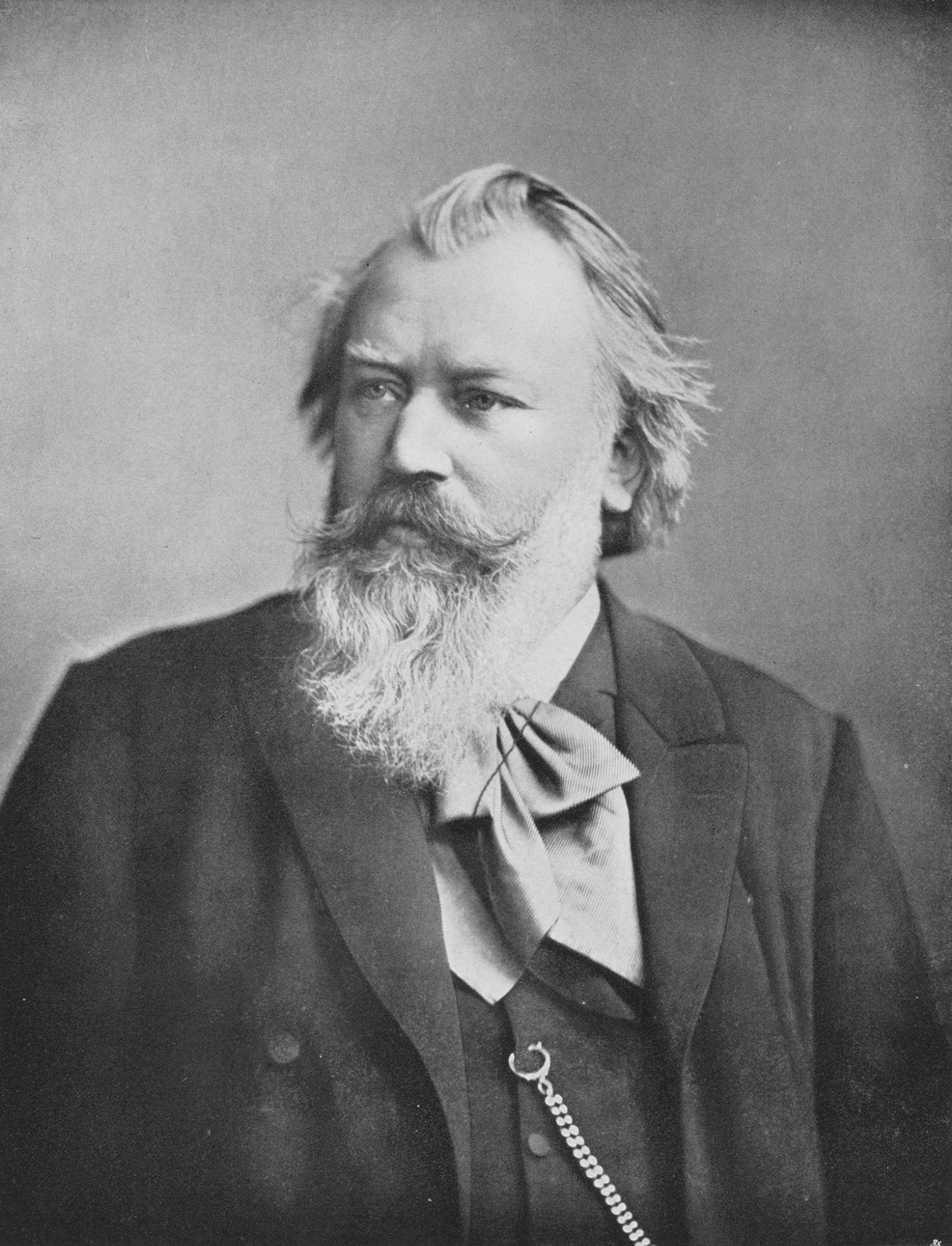
Johannes Brahms

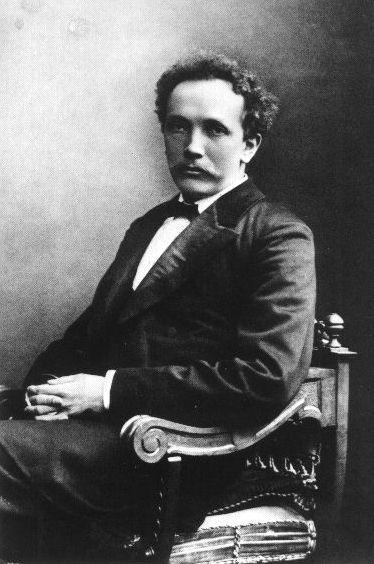
Richard Strauss

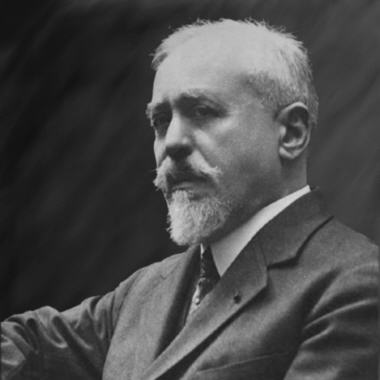
Paul Dukas

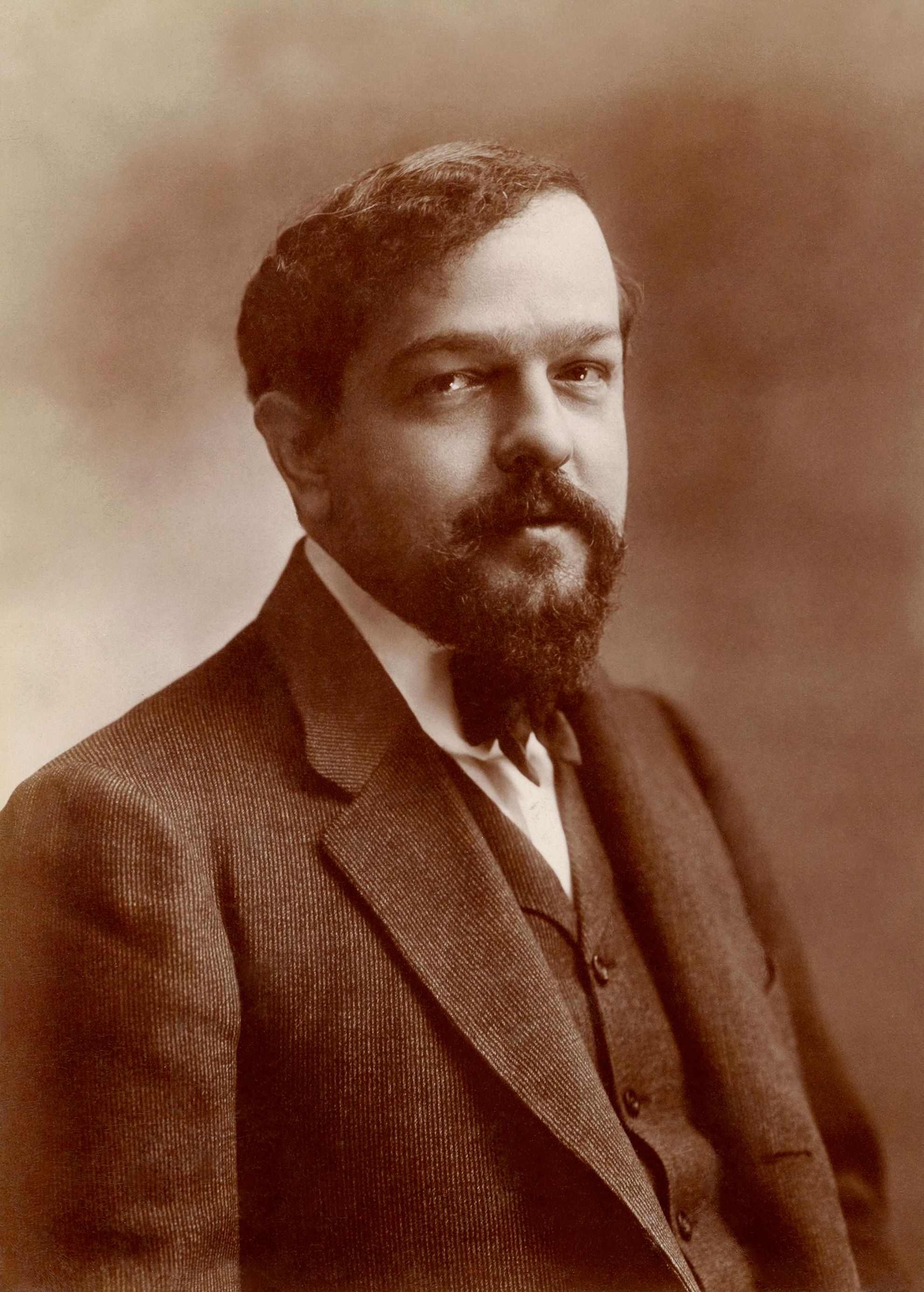
Claude Debussy

=== Sports ===
- The Argentine Football Association is founded in 1893.
- The Campeonato Argentino Abierto de Polo is organized for the first time in 1893.
- The 1896 Summer Olympics officially known as the Games of the I Olympiad, was the first international Olympic Games held in modern history
- Australian Football League as Victorian Football League started its first season in 1897. This is currently the premier division of Australian Football.

=== Other ===
- 1890 – Lipton tea was introduced.
- 1894- The Hershey Company was founded.
- 1885–1913 – Annie Oakley, Li'l Sure Shot performed throughout US and Europe with Buffalo Bill's Wild West Show

== People ==
=== Politics ===
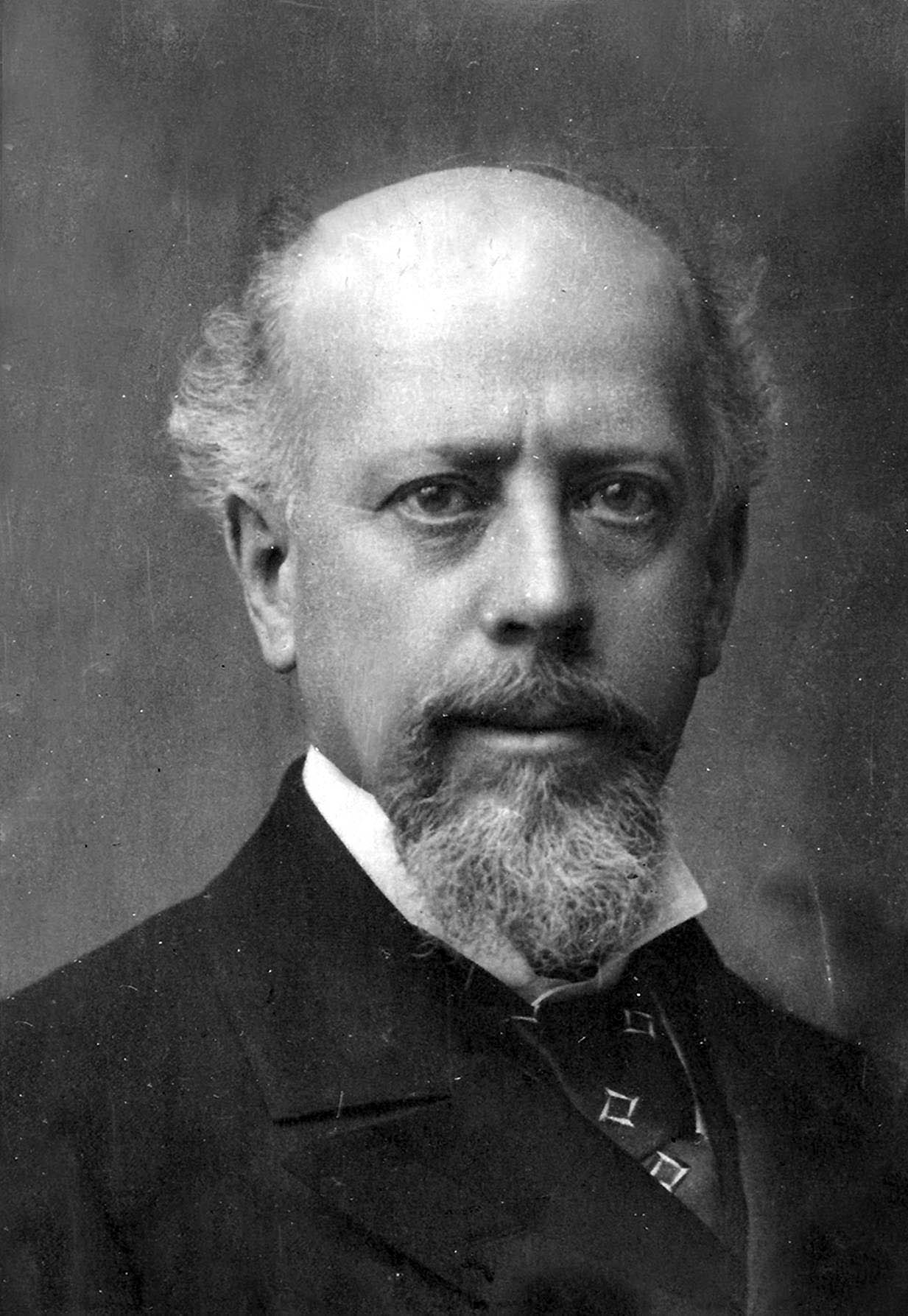
Julio Argentino Roca, President of Argentina

- Charles Albert Gobat, Secretary-general Inter-Parliamentary Union
- Henri Morel, Director World Intellectual Property Organization
- Gustave Moynier, President International Committee of the Red Cross
- Julio Argentino Roca, 9th and 14th President of Argentina.
- Grover Cleveland, President of the United States

=== Entertainers ===
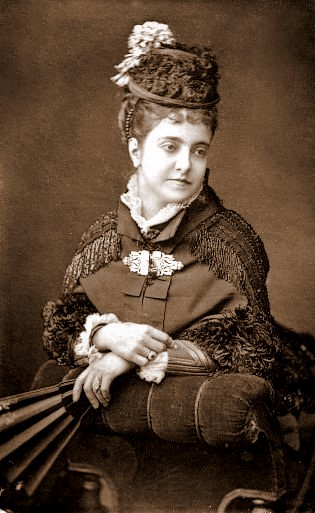
Adelina Patti

- Adelina Patti

=== Authors ===
- Kate Chopin (The Awakening)
- Stephen Crane
- Henry James
- E. E. Smith
- Edith Wharton

=== Sports figures ===
- Cap Anson
- Bob Fitzsimmons
- Jim O'Rourke
- Cy Young

=== Other people ===
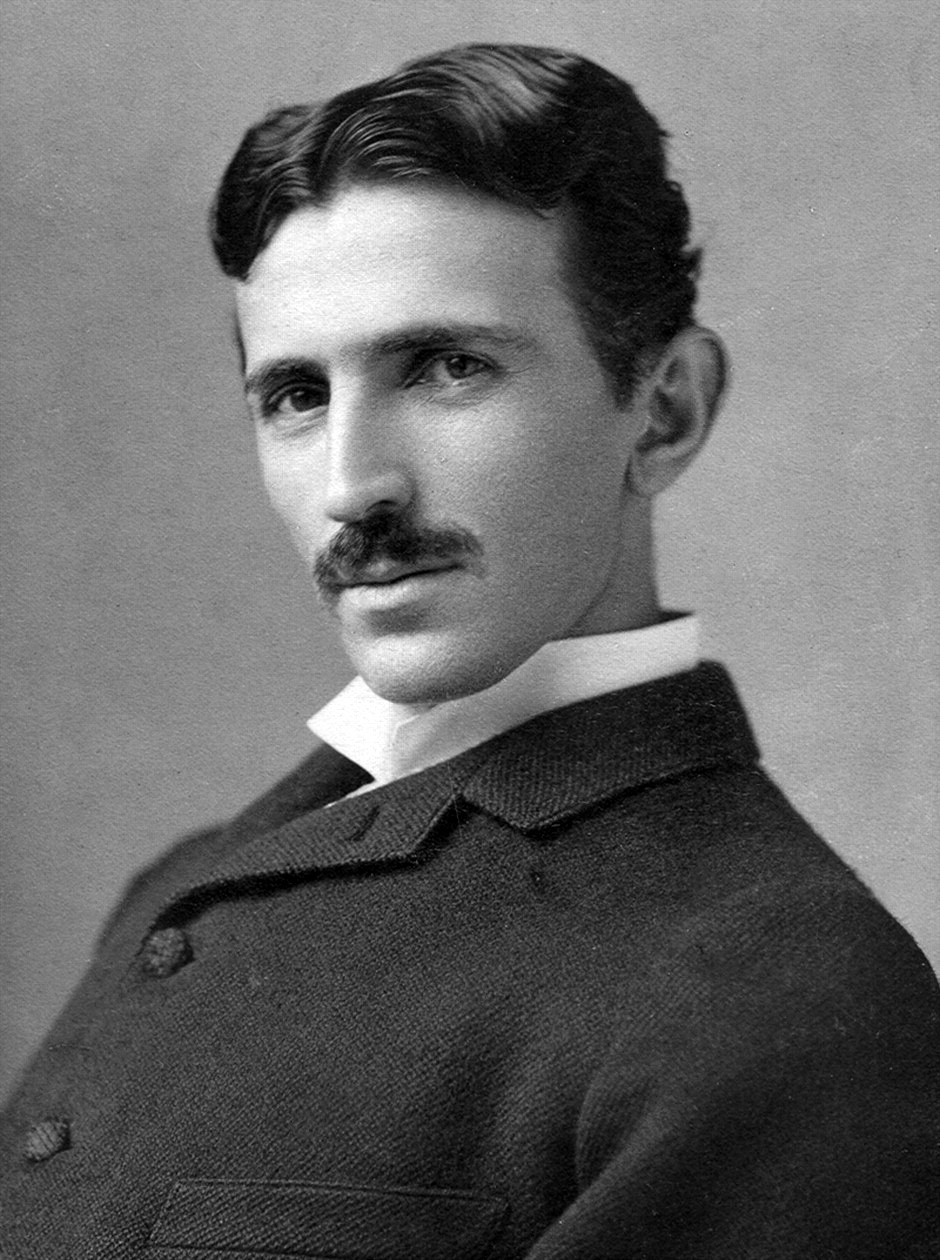
Nikola Tesla, c. 1890

- Auguste Vaillant, French anarchist
- Émile Henry, French anarchist
- Martial Bourdin, French anarchist
- Sante Geronimo Caserio, anarchist and assassin of Marie François Sadi Carnot
- Simón Radowitzky, Argentine anarchist and assassin of Ramón Lorenzo Falcón
- Thomas Lipton, Scottish businessman, merchant and yachtsman known for Lipton tea
- Crawford Goldsby, Wild West, outlaw
- Alberto Williams, Argentine composer.
- Nikola Tesla, a Serbian-American electrical engineer and inventor

== See also ==
- List of decades, centuries, and millennia
- Victorian era
- Gilded Age (during the earlier years of the decade)
- Progressive Era (during the later years of the decade)
- Gay Nineties
