= Pedir Expedition =

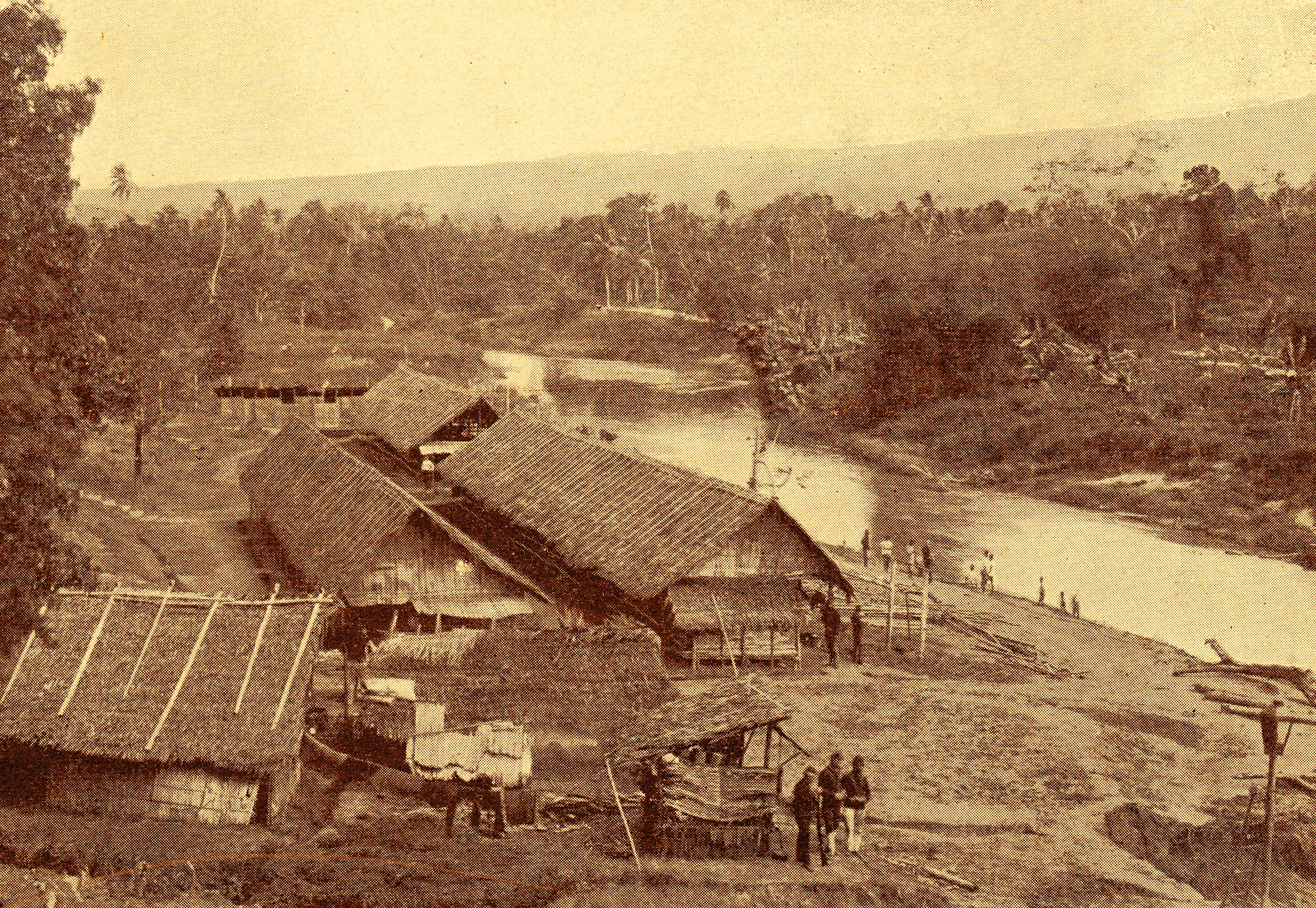
Artillery and cavalry bivouac at Selimoen.

The Pedir Expedition (Dutch: Pedir-expeditie) was a punitive expedition of the Royal Netherlands East Indies Army against Pedir (Acheh) in 1897 and 1898.

== Sources ==
- 1898. Bintang Djaoeh. Pedir en de aanstaande expeditie (met een overzichtskaart van Atjeh). Eigen Haard. Bladzijde 362-365.
- 1898. Bintang Djaoeh. De Pedir-expeditie (Selimoen). Eigen Haard. Bladzijde 376-379, 388-390 en 410-413
- 1898. In memoriam. Luitenant J. Goldenberg. Eigen Haard. Bladzijde 459.
