= Altman, Colorado =

Ghost town in Teller County, Colorado, United States

- Ghost town
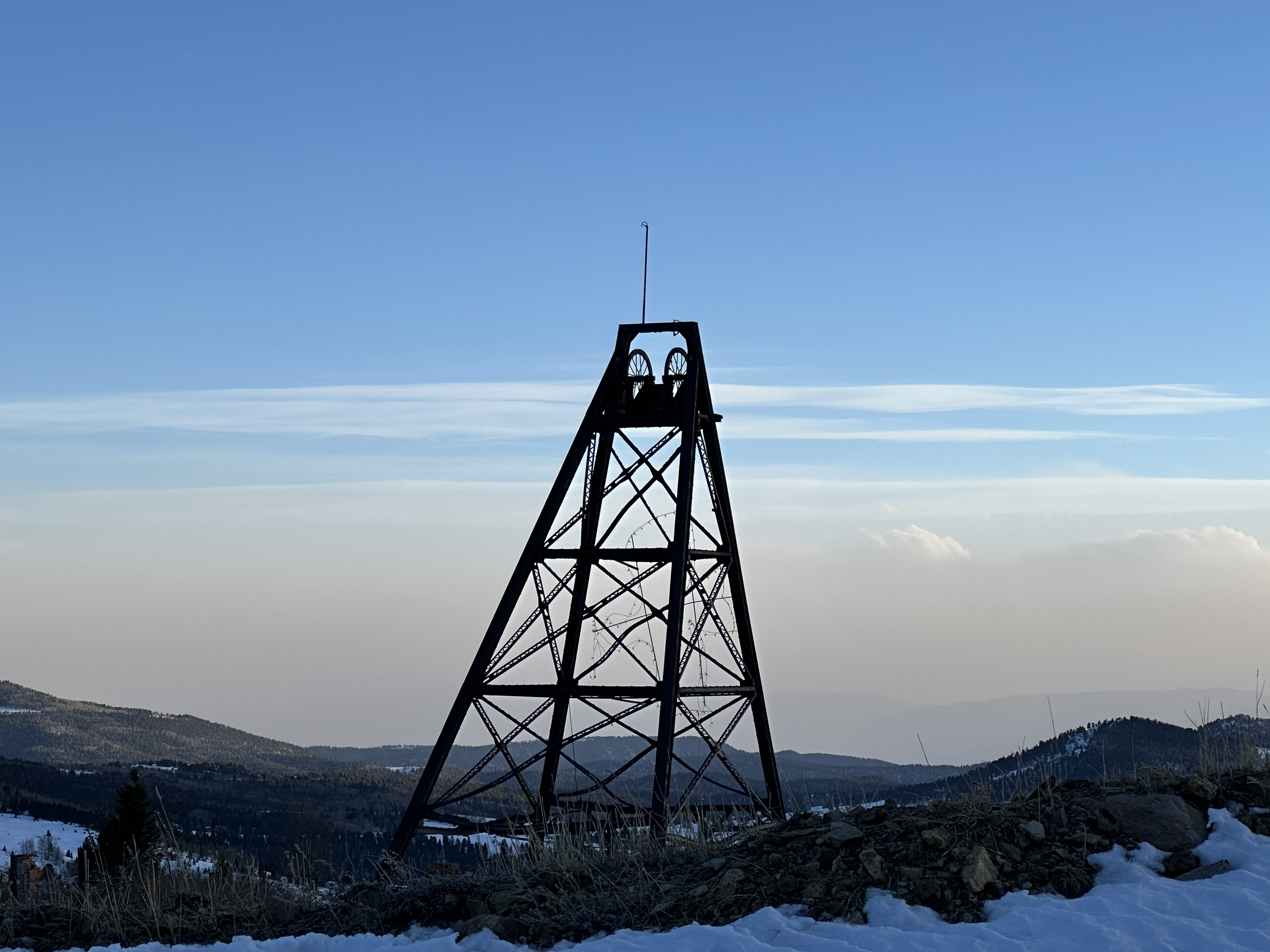
- Headframe at road entering Altman, Colorado

- Location of Altman, Colorado. Altman (Colorado)
- Coordinates: 38°44′10″N 105°08′02″W
- Country: United States
- State: Colorado
- County: Teller

Government
  - Body: Teller County
- Elevation: 10,630 ft (3,240 m)
- Time zone: UTC−07:00 (MST)
  - Summer (DST): UTC−06:00 (MDT)
- GNIS pop ID: 203908

Altman is an extinct mining town located in Teller County, Colorado, United States.

== History ==
The Altman, Colorado, post office operated from January 18, 1894, until May 30, 1911. Much of the town was destroyed by fire on May 24, 1903.

== See also ==
- Front Range Urban Corridor
