= Ena Bertoldi =

British contortionist appearing in kinetoscope films (1878 – 1906)

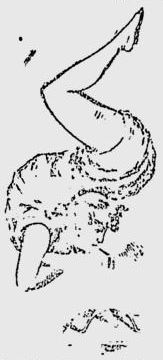
- Illustration of Ena Bertoldi in Toledo Evening Bee (1892)
- Born: Beatrice Mary Claxton; 1878; Sheffield
- Died: 1 April 1906 (aged 27–28)
- Burial place: Lambeth cemetery, Tooting
- Occupation: Contortionist
- Years active: 1886-1901
- Known for: Kinetoscope films
- Notable work: Bertoldi (Table Contortion); Bertoldi (Mouth Support)
- Spouse: Albert George Spink

Ena Bertoldi (born Beatrice Mary Claxton) (1878 – 1906) was an English contortionist who was the subject of one of the first kinetoscope films.

== Career ==
She was born Beatrice Mary Claxton to performer and agent Thomas Claxton Gregory, and began performing in circuses at the age of eight. In 1891, she travelled to America and performed with the Howard Athenaeum Specialty Co. In 1894, she performed at Koster & Bial's theatre and at the Union Square theatre as part of the B.F. Keith circuit.

Along with many of the circus and vaudeville acts at Koster & Bial's, she went to New Jersey to make films for the Thomas Edison Kinetoscope system at the Black Maria studio. Her films, filmed in the spring of 1894 and released that year, were Bertoldi (Table Contortion) and Bertoldi (Mouth support). The films were shown at the Holland Brothers parlour, where patrons paid twenty-five cents to watch a twenty- to thirty-second film through a slot in a wooden box.

In 1898 – 9, she carried out a twelve-month contract for G.A. Payne for £1300, earning her the nickname 'Queen of Contortionists' by the Royal Magazine. She claimed to be able to carry out her feats 'without feeling.'

== Personal life and death ==
In 1896, Beatrice married fellow performer Albert George Spink, who appears in the 1927 short film Dandy George and Rosie. She filed for separation from him in 1904 on the grounds of physical abuse. She died on 1 April 1906 of alcohol abuse.
