= Grace Livingston Furniss =

American playwright (1864-1938)

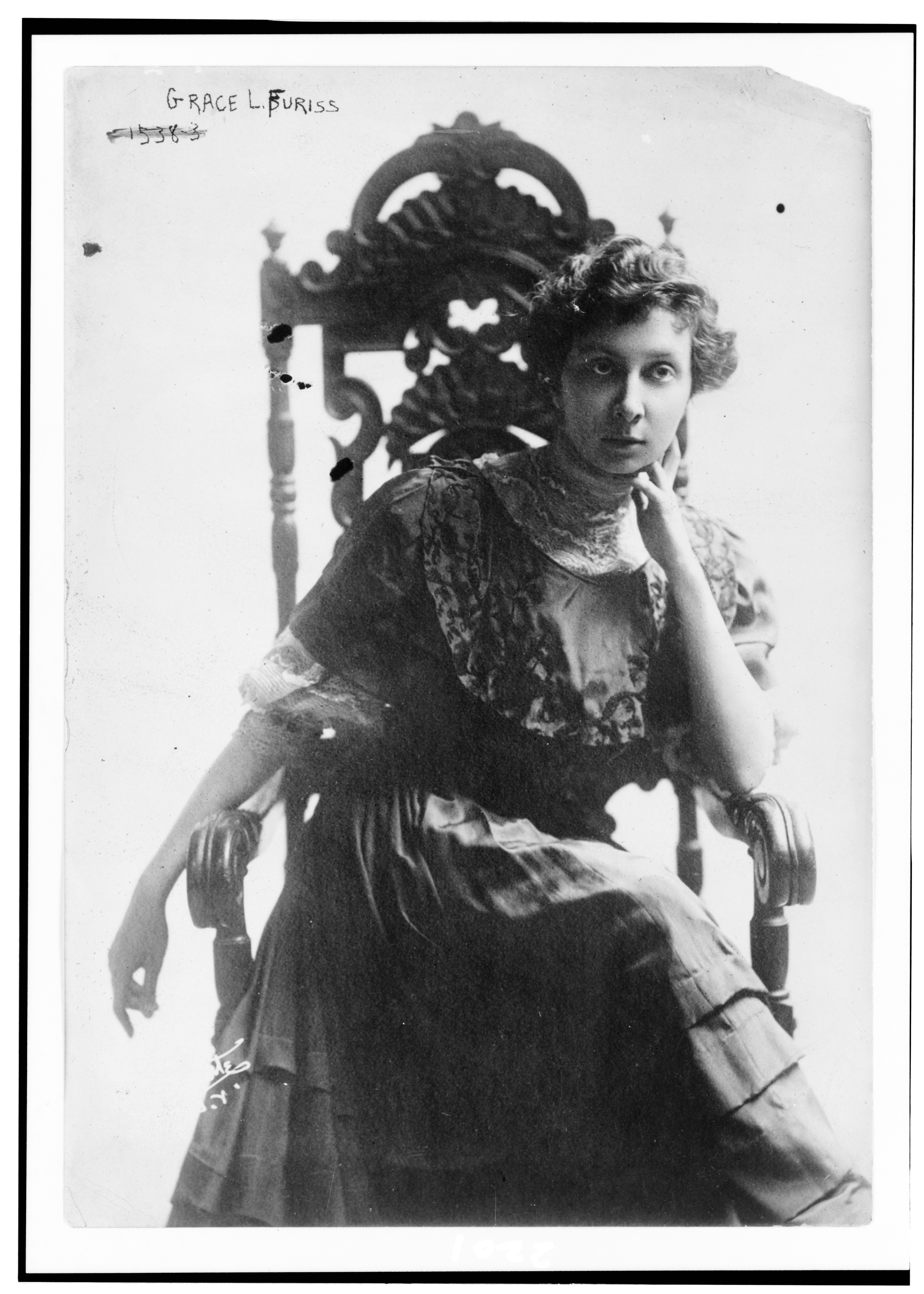
- Born: March 15, 1864; Bayonne
- Died: April 20, 1938; Rye
- Occupation: Playwright
- Father: William Furniss

Grace Livingston Furniss (March 15, 1864 – April 20, 1938) was an American playwright.

Grace Livingston Furniss was born on March 15, 1864 in Bayonne. She was the daughter of author William Furniss and Louise (Chollet) Furniss.

She collaborated with Abby Sage Richardson on a number of plays, including The Pride of Jennico, an adaptation of the novel by Agnes Castle and Egerton Castle. Directed by Edward E. Rose, it premiered at the Criterion Theatre on March 6, 1900 and ran for 143 performances. James K. Hackett played Basil Jennico, a Bohemian nobleman who marries a princess after some machinations including identity switching, royal plotting, and a gypsy.

Her play The Man on the Box premiered at Hoyt's Theatre on October 3, 1905 and ran for 111 performances. Based on the novel by Harold McGrath, Henry E. Dixey plays a lieutenant on leave who pretends to be a coachman, but picks up the wrong woman. The couple ends up together after a series of melodramatic misadventures.

Two of her plays were adapted into films: The Pride of Jennico (1914) and Gretna Green (1915). She was also writer of the short film On With the Dance (Vitagraph, 1915).

Grace Livingston Furniss died at the Colly Convalescent Home in Rye, New York on April 20, 1938,

== Bibliography ==
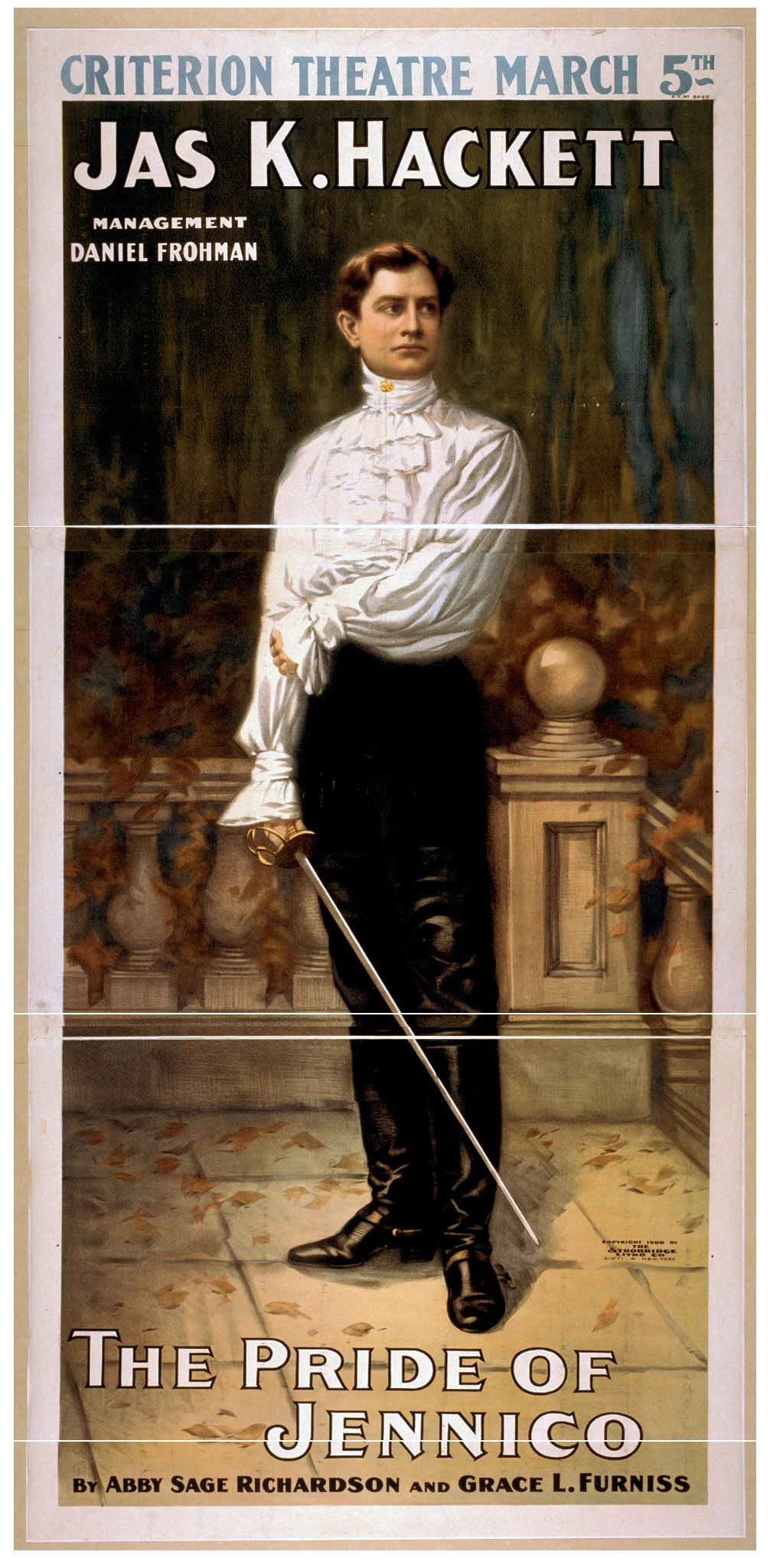
Poster for The Pride of Jennico (1900)

- A Box of Monkeys: A Parlour Farce in Two Acts. Boston: W. Baker 1890.
- A Box of Monkeys and Other Farce-Comedies. NY: Harper, 1891. Includes Tulu, The Jack Trust, and The Veneered Savage.
- The Corner Lot. Boston, W. Baker, 1891.
- The Jack Trust. NY: Harper, 1891.
- The Nyvtalops or Nyctalopia or a Nyctalops or Myctalops: In Three Acts. NY, 1891.
- Tulu. NY: Harper, 1891.
- The Veneered Savage. NY: Harper, 1891.
- Second-Floor, Spoopendyke: A Farce in One Act. Boston: W. Baker, 1892.
- The Flying Wedge: A Football Farce in One Act. Boston: W. Baker, 1896.
- A Dakota Widow: A Comedy in One Act. NY: S. French, 1915.
- Father Walks Out: A Comedy in Three Acts. NY: S. French, 1928.
- The Man on the Case , 1931.
- Captain of His Soul: A Play. London: n.d.

=== Unpublished plays ===
- A Colonial Girl with Abby Sage Richardson, Lyceum Theatre, 1898.
- Americans at Home with Abby Sage Richardson, Lyceum Theatre, 1899.
- Smoldering Fires, Empire Theatre, 1894
- A Close Call, Empire Theatre, 1895
- The Pride of Jennico with Abby Sage Richardson, Criterion Theatre, 1900.
- Robert of Sicily: A Romantic Drama in Four Acts, 1900. (Adaptation of a work by Henry Wadsworth Longfellow)
- A Gentleman of France, 1901.
- Gretna Green, Madison Square Theatre, 1903.
- Mrs. Jack, Wallack's Theatre, 1902.
- The Man on the Box, 1905.
- Honor Bright, 1906.
