= Elinor Sweetman =

Irish poet and author

- Born: Elinor Mary Sweetman c. 1860/1861; County Laois, United Kingdom of Great Britain and Ireland
- Died: 1922; Clontarf, County Dublin, Ireland
- Occupations: poet and author
- Relatives: Agnes Castle (sister), Egerton Castle (brother-in-law); Mary Elizabeth Francis (sister)

Elinor Mary Sweetman (c. 1860/1861 – 1922) was a Victorian era Irish poet and author who worked with both her sisters.

== Early life ==
Sweetman was born in County Dublin to Michael James Sweetman (1829–1864), of Lamberton Park, Queen's County, JP, High Sheriff of Queen's County, and (Mary) Margaret, only child and heir of Michael Powell, of Fitzwilliam Square, Dublin. She had two brothers and three sisters. The Sweetman family were landed gentry of Longtown, County Kildare, and per family tradition were "long settled in Dublin" and "previously resident near Callan and Newtown, County Kilkenny", tracing their line back to the mid-1500s.

After her father's death, when she was a small child, the remaining family moved to Brussels in 1873 and she spent her summers in Switzerland. Her sisters, Agnes Sweetman and Mary Elizabeth Sweetman were also writers. With her sisters she began two family magazines: the Ivy Home Magazine’ and Ivy Home Library. Her poetry was used in several of her sisters' novels. She remained unmarried and was one of her mother's heirs after her death in 1912.

Sweetman was a poet and writer published in magazines and periodicals as well as in collections of poetry and her own folios. Her work was often illustrated by well known artists including Arthur Wallis Mills and Elizabeth Gulland. Though she has largely been ignored as a writer she was critically celebrated at the time and is a clear example of the poetry of women at the time discussing religion and romance.

== Selected works ==
- Carmina Mariana; an English anthology in verse in honour of or in relation to the Blessed Virgin Mary, Edited by Shipley, Orby, 1832-1916, ed; (1894)
- Footsteps of the Gods and other poema (1893)
- Pastorals and other poems (1899)
- The wild orchard (1911)
- Psalms, verse (1911)
- The Oxford Book Of Victorian Verse (1912)
- Alfred Perceval Graves (1972). The Book of Irish Poetry, Edited with an Introd. Books for Libraries Press. ISBN 978-0-8369-6345-8.
