= Mace Greenleaf =

American actor (1872–1912)

Mace Greanleaf
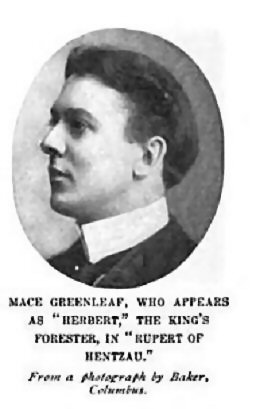
- Born: December 8, 1872; Dixfield, Maine, US
- Died: March 23, 1912 (aged 39); Philadelphia, Pennsylvania, US
- Occupations: Stage and Screen Actor

Mace Greenleaf (December 8, 1872 – March 23, 1912) was an American stage and silent film actor.

== Early life ==
Mace Greenleaf was born at Dixfield, Maine, the only child of Charles Ward Greenleaf and Mary Stanley (née Eustis) Greenleaf. Charles Greenleaf was a native of Massachusetts and supported his family employed as a surveyor.

== Career ==
Greenleaf's first important role came in the late 1890s playing Herbert, the king's forester, in stock productions of The Prisoner of Zenda and its companion piece Rupert of Hentzau. In 1898, he played Mr. Hunston in Sir Arthur Wing Pinero's play Trelawny of the 'Wells' that opened at the Lyceum Theatre in New York on November 22, 1898. His next Broadway performance was in The Pride of Jennico with James K. Hackett and Bertha Galland staged at the Criterion Theatre in 1900. Later that year, he played the role of Myrtle May's lover in a road production of The Parish Priest with Daniel Sully.

During the first decade of the 20th century, Mace Greenleaf played leading roles in stock companies on both coasts and middle America. He returned to Broadway in 1905 to play the prince of Wales in the romantic musical Edmund Burke. In 1911, he joined the fledgling motion picture industry where he would appear in at least 18 films in the final year of his life.

== Marriage ==
In September 1906, Greenleaf married Lucy (a.k.a. Lucie) Banning in Santa Ana, California. Banning came from a very wealthy family that owned Catalina Island, and was remembered at the time for an affair she had while married to her first husband that ended with the suicide of her lover. Lucy Banning was known as something of a free spirit and often scandalized "polite society" with the number of men in her life. She left Greenleaf in 1910 for the son of a prominent judge.

== Death ==
Mace Greenleaf died on March 23, 1912, while in Philadelphia after a brief battle with pneumonia.
