= The Pride of Jennico (film) =

- Directed by: J. Searle Dawley
- Based on: the 1897 novel by Agnes and Egerton Castle and the 1900 play The Pride of Jennico by Abby Sage Richardson and Grace Livingston Furniss
- Produced by: Adolph Zukor, Famous Players Film Company
- Starring: House Peters
- Distributed by: State Rights
- Release date: February 20, 1914
- Running time: 4 reels
- Country: USA
- Language: Silent..English titles

The Pride of Jennico is a lost 1914 silent swashbuckler film directed by J. Searle Dawley. It was produced by Adolph Zukor and released on a State Rights basis. On the Broadway stage, the play starred James K. Hackett, Bertha Galland and Arthur Hoops.

== Cast ==
- House Peters - Basil Jennico
- George Moss - Basil's Uncle
- Marie Leonard - Princess Ottilie
- Augustus Balfour - Duke of Dornheim
- Emily Calloway - Marie, Ottilie's Maid
- Peter Lang - Von Krappitz
- Hal Clarendon - Prince Eugen
- Betty Harte - The Gypsy Maid, Michel
