= Abby Sage Richardson =

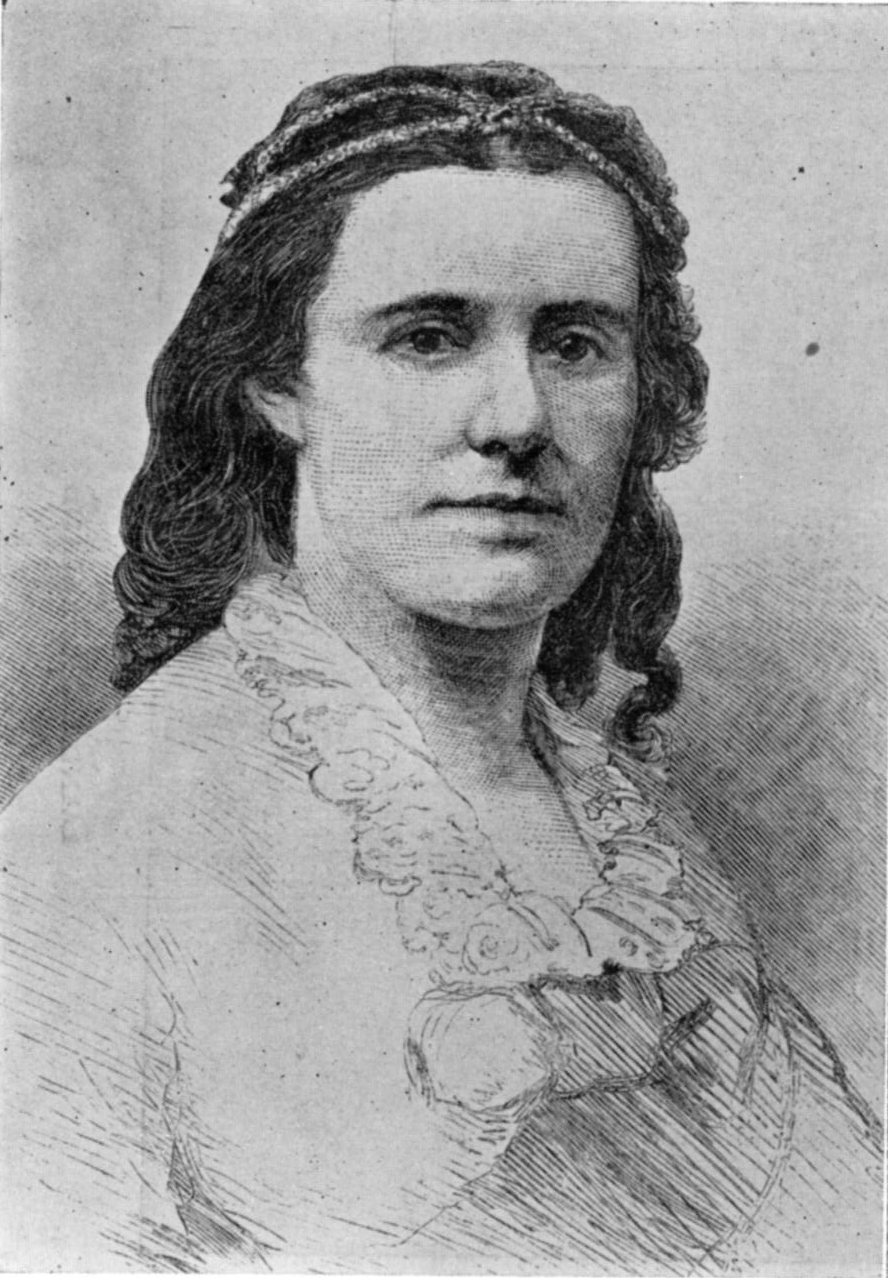
- Born: October 14, 1837; Massachusetts
- Died: December 5, 1900; Rome
- Occupation: Writer
- Spouse: Albert D. Richardson

Abby Maria Sage Richardson (October 14, 1837 – December 5, 1900) was an American author, dramatic reader, and actress. She was at the center of a notorious 1870 murder trial after her former husband, Daniel McFarland, shot and killed her second husband, Albert D. Richardson.

== Life ==
Abby Sage was born on October 14, 1837 in Massachusetts, the eldest child of William and Abigail Sage. In 1842, the family moved to Manchester, New Hampshire, where her father opened a harness and twine shop. She was educated at a normal school in New Brighton, New Hampshire and began teaching at Webster's Academy in New Haven, Connecticut. In 1857, she met and married a 39-year old lawyer, Daniel McFarland. She later discovered that McFarland had no law practice and made what little money he had through land speculation, blackmail, and seeking political patronage jobs. He was also physically abusive and frequently drunk.

She showed promise as a dramatic reader, and through her performances in New York City met some prominent friends, of which she was closest to Lucia Calhoun. Through these friends she was able to secure work performing dramatic readings, publishing in newspapers and magazines, and in small acting roles under the name M. Cushing. Her first book was Percy's Year of Rhymes (1867), a collection of poetry, followed by Pebbles and Pearls for the Young Folks (1868).

In the spring of 1866, she met Albert D. Richardson, the famous New York Tribune reporter who wrote about his capture by Confederate forces, imprisonment, and escape during the American Civil War. Richardson was a widower with three children from his late wife. As the McFarland marriage disintegrated, Abby McFarland and Albert Richardson grew closer, while Daniel McFarland retaliated by filing multiple lawsuits, then shooting Richardson in March 1867. Richardson suffered only a flesh wound and refused to press charges, wishing to avoid a public scandal. In October 1869, Abby McFarland secured a divorce from Daniel McFarland in Indiana to escape his abuse and to eventually marry Richardson.

On November 25, 1869, Daniel McFarland shot Albert Richardson again, this time in the New York Tribune offices. Albert Richardson lived for a week, long enough for him to marry Abby McFarland in a deathbed ceremony presided over by Rev. Henry Ward Beecher. McFarland's murder trial the next year was a public spectacle, with the press and defense council depicting Albert Richardson as a "libertine" and adherent of "free love". Abby Richardson's accounts of abuse were ignored while public sympathy for McFarland abounded. The defense council's case employed a temporary insanity defense and after the jury deliberated for less than two hours, McFarland was found not guilty on May 10, 1870.

Abby Richardson was left to care for her son William and for Albert Richardson's surviving children. In 1871 she published Garnered Sheaves from the Writings of Albert Deane Richardson, a selection of his articles along with a short biography written by her. In September 1871, the family moved to Chicago, unfortunately shortly before the Great Chicago Fire the next month. They persevered and Richardson resumed her career of public readings and writing. She published Stories from Old English Poetry in 1872 and Songs from the Old Dramatists in 1873. Her The history of our country from its discovery by Columbus to the celebration of the centennial anniversary of its Declaration of independence (1875) was a lengthy history of the United States, published to coincide with the US centennial. She published a series of her lectures on literature, Familiar Talks on English Literature (1881). Richardson also achieved success in the theatre, adapting and translating works for the stage, including Americans Abroad by Victorien Sardou and The Prince and the Pauper by Mark Twain. She collaborated on four plays with Grace Livingston Furniss, including the successful Pride of Jennico (1900), an adaptation of the novel by Agnes and Egerton Castle.

While touring Italy with her son William, she caught pneumonia and died on December 5, 1900, in Rome.

== Children ==
She had three children with McFarland:

- Jessie McFarland (December 1858-June 1859)
- Percy McFarland (April 1860-1928). He later took the name Percy Sage and became a theatre agent and manager.
- Daniel McFarland, Jr. (born 1864), renamed William Sage after the trial. He was a banker and stockbroker turned novelist.

After Richardson's death, she cared for his surviving children by his first wife:

- Leander Pease Richardson (February 28, 1856 – February 2, 1918), journalist and playwright
- Maude Richardson (1859-1876), died of tuberculosis
- Albert Richardson, Jr. (b. 1862) was placed in the Elm Hill Private School and Home for the Education of Feeble-Minded Youth in Barre, Massachusetts
