= The Pride of Jennico =

1897 stageplay

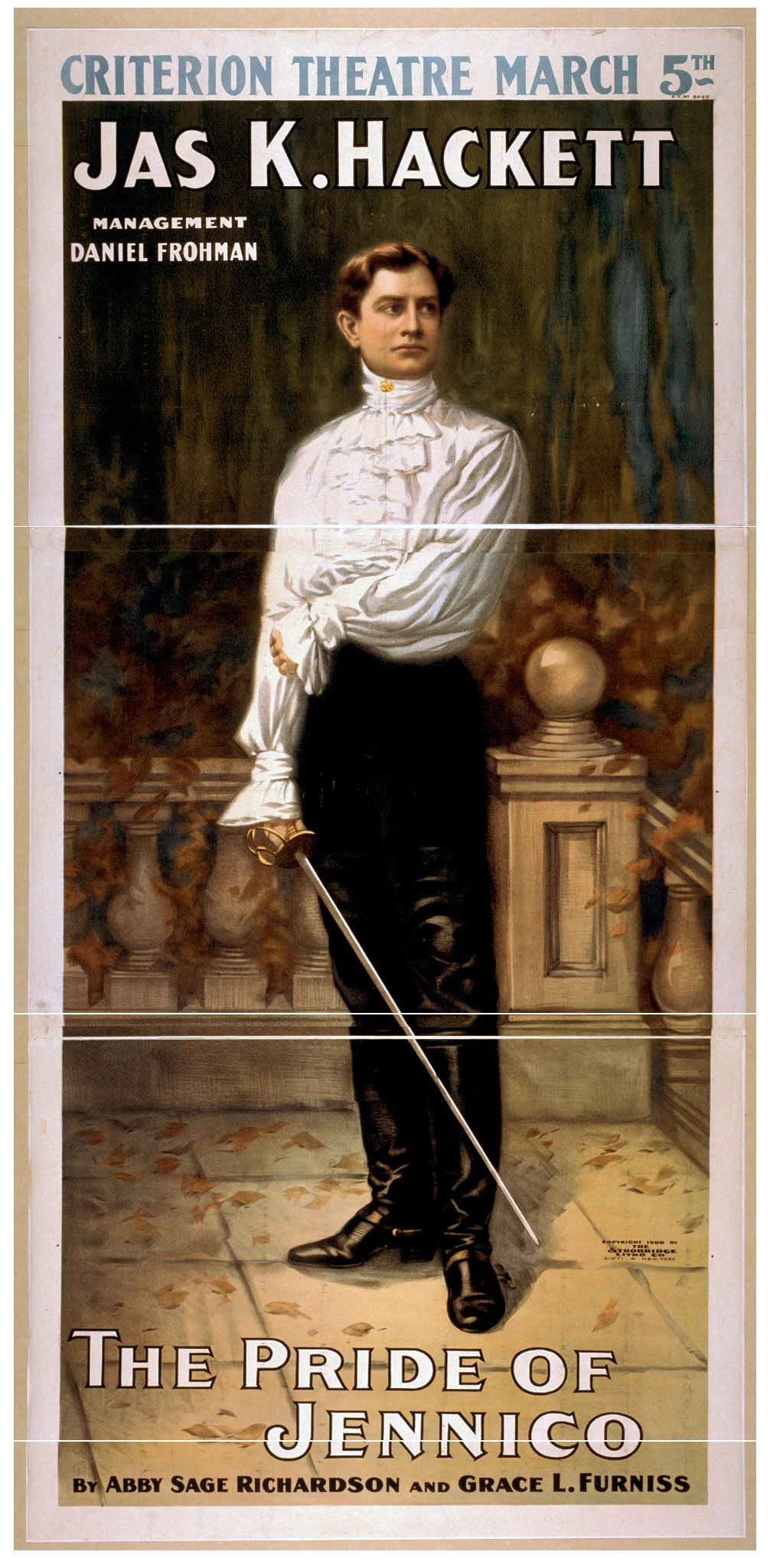
Poster for The Pride of Jennico (1900)

The Pride of Jennico is a four-act play by Abby Sage Richardson and Grace Livingston Furniss based on the book by the same name from Agnes Castle and Egerton Castle published in 1897 by the Macmillan Company.

The setting is the mid-1700s and the plot revolves around Captain Basil Jennico, an English gentleman in the service of the Austrian Empire, and the Princess Marie Ottilie of Lausitz-Rothenburg.

In America The Pride of Jennico was produced by Charles Frohman and staged by Edward Everett Rose. The play was adapted for the stage by Abby Sage Richardson and Grace L. Furniss with costumes and set design by Herrmann and E. G. Unitt, respectively. The Pride of Jennico opened in New York on March 6, 1900, at the Criterion Theatre on 44th and Broadway, and had a run of 111 performances.

== Reception ==
A review published in The New York Times on March 7, 1900, read:

Three emphatic hits were scored last night in the Criterion Theatre by James K. Hackett, who again establishes his right to rank high in the list of romantic actors; by Bertha Galland, who met a New York audience for the first time and conquered it, and by The Pride of Jennico a melodramatic play that Abby Sage Richardson and Grace L. Furniss have constructed from the chief incident in the novel by Agnes and Egerton Castle.

== Opening night cast ==
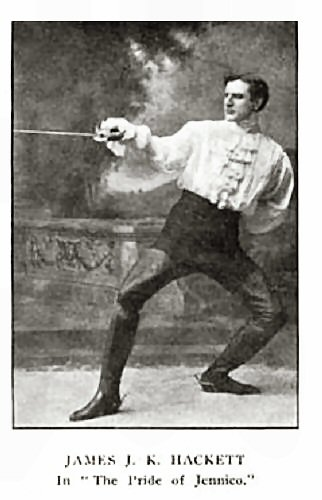
James K. Hackett as Captain Basil Jennico

- Carl Ahrendt as Janos
- George Alison as Karl
- Frank Anderson as Gottlieb
- Virginia Buchanan as Lisbeth
- Edward Donnelly as Anton
- Bertha Galland as Marie Ottilie
- Mace Greenleaf as Timar
- James K. Hackett as Basil Jennico
- Thomas A. Hall as Von Krappitz
- Miss Head as Rosel
- Arthur Hoops as Sir John Beddoes
- James Ottley as Landlord
- Sidney Price as Ismali
- Grace Reals as Michel
- Amy Ricard as Bertha
- Gertrude Rivers as Marie Pahlen
- Brigham Royce as Van Rothenburg
- Longley Taylor as Markham
- George Trimble as Hildebrand
- Stephen Wright as Fabula

== Adaptations ==
Jesse Lasky produced a film version of the play in 1914 starring House Peters and Betty Harte.
