= Sweet Kitty Bellairs (1916 film) =

1916 film by James Young

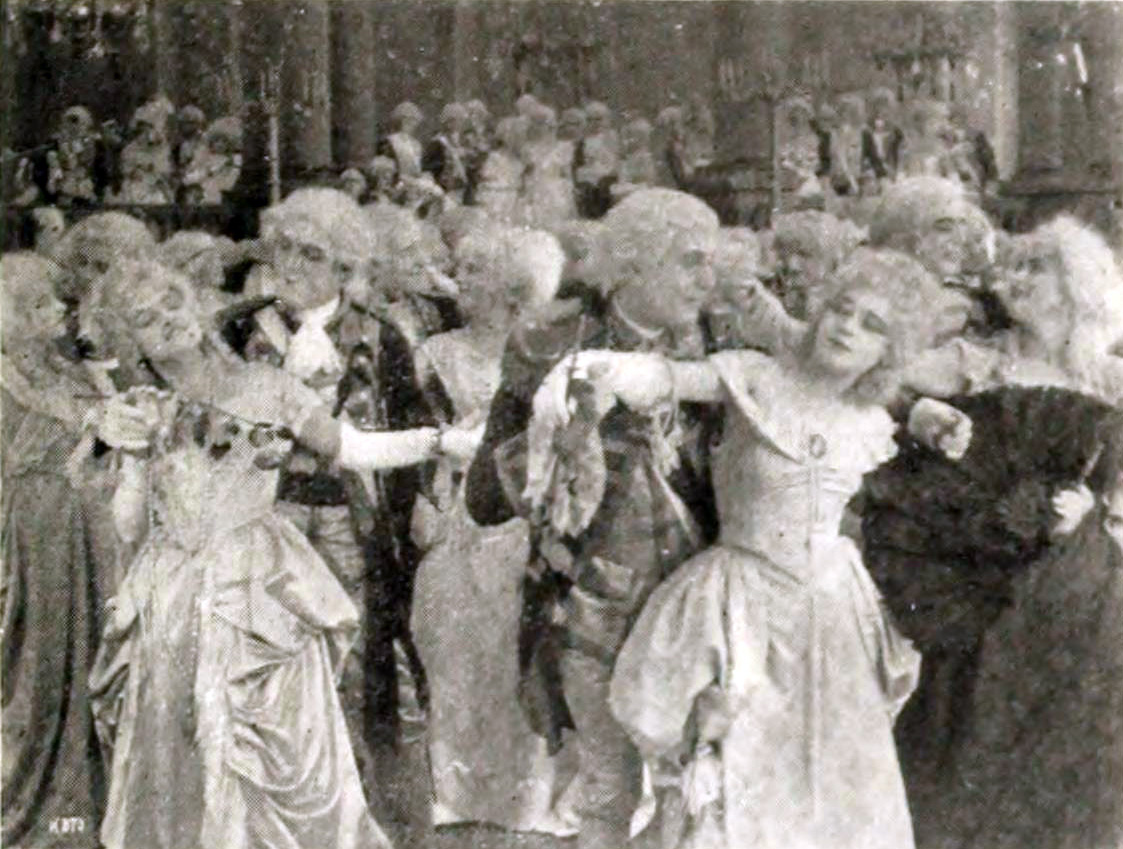
- Directed by: James Young
- Written by: James Young (scenario)
- Based on: The Bath Comedy by: Agnes and Egerton Castle Sweet Kitty Bellairs; David Belasco (play)
- Produced by: Adolph Zukor; Daniel Frohman
- Starring: Mae Murray; Tom Forman
- Cinematography: Paul P. Perry
- Distributed by: Famous Players–Lasky; Paramount Pictures
- Release date: May 22, 1916 (United States)
- Running time: 50 minutes
- Country: United States
- Language: Silent

Sweet Kitty Bellairs is a 1916 American silent romantic comedy film based on the 1903 play Sweet Kitty Bellairs by David Belasco. Belasco's play was based on the 1900 novel The Bath Comedy, by Agnes and Egerton Castle, which also served as source material for the 1916 silent film. Belasco's play was a huge Broadway success for lead actress Henrietta Crosman. The film version stars Mae Murray and was directed by James Young.

== Cast ==
- Mae Murray as Kitty Bellairs
- Tom Forman as Lord Verney
- Belle Bennett as Lady Julia
- Lucille Young as Lady Barbara Flyte
- Joseph King as Sir Jasper
- James Neill as Colonel Villers
- Lucille Lavarney as Lady Maria
- Horace B. Carpenter as Captain Spicer
- Robert Gray as Captain O'Hara
- Loretta Young (uncredited)

== Production ==
Filming began in March 1916, at the Lasky studio in Los Angeles, concurrently with a $150,000 expansion to the studio. A replica of the casino at Bath was constructed for a ballroom scene, and two hundred extras were clothed in costumes by Alfreda Hoffman.

== Reception ==
Motion Picture News reviewer Harvey F. Thew gave the film a positive review, describing the film as having "an undoubted charm" and being "especially well-cast."

Motography reviewer Thomas C. Kennedy called the film "very delightful screen entertainment" and praised Mae Murray for rising "to the heights of a real picture star." He also praised the film for its cinematography and the costumes.

== Preservation ==
With no holdings located in archives, Sweet Kitty Bellairs is considered a lost film.

== Other adaptations ==
Sweet Kitty Bellairs was remade again in 1930 as a sound musical comedy filmed in Technicolor.

== See also ==
- List of lost films
