= Rose of the World (1918 film) =

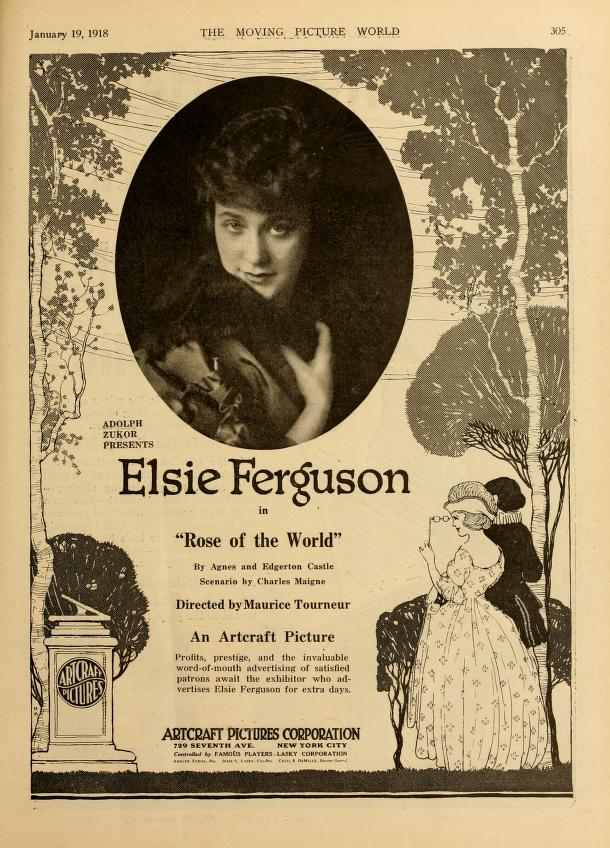
- Directed by: Maurice Tourneur
- Written by: Charles Maigne (scenario)
- Based on: Rose of the World by Agnes Castle and Egerton Castle
- Produced by: Adolph Zukor; Jesse L. Lasky
- Starring: Elsie Ferguson; Wyndham Standing
- Cinematography: John van den Broek
- Distributed by: Artcraft Pictures
- Release date: January 7, 1918
- Running time: 5 reels
- Country: United States
- Language: Silent (English intertitles)

Rose of the World is a 1918 American silent drama film produced by Famous Players–Lasky and distributed by Artcraft Pictures, an affiliate of Paramount Pictures. It was considered lost until a print was found in the Belgian Film Archive on May 7, 2026. It is based on the novels of Agnes and Egerton Castle. The film was directed by Maurice Tourneur and stars Elsie Ferguson.

It is no relation to the 1925 Warner Brothers film of the same name which is based upon a different novel.

== Plot ==
As described in a film magazine, Captain Harry English is reported to have been killed during a battle between factions in India and his wife Rosamond remarries. As time passes Rosamond finds that her love for her deceased husband is greater than her love for the older man that she has married, Sir Arthur Gerardine. She goes to live at Harry's old house and there breaks down and tells her husband the truth. She becomes ill and in her ravings asks for Harry. Harry, who was not killed, learns that his wife has remarried and, disguised as an Indian, becomes secretary to Rosamond's husband. He comes to her at a peak psychological moment and, after the shock wears off, they are reunited.

== Cast ==
- Elsie Ferguson as Rosamond English
- Wyndham Standing as Captain Harry English
- Percy Marmont as Lieutenant Belhune
- Ethel Martin as Lady Cunningham
- Clarence Handyside as Sir Arthur Gerardine (credited as Clarence Handysides)
- June Sloane as His Niece
- Marie Benedetta as Jani
- Gertrude Le Brandt as Mary
- Sloane De Masher as Dr. Chatelard
