= Amy Ricard =

American actress (1882–1937)

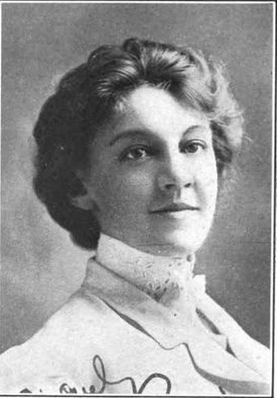
- Richard in 1908
- Born: January 1, 1882; Boston, Massachusetts, U.S.
- Died: August 17, 1937 (aged 55); New York City, U.S.
- Occupation: Actress
- Years active: 1900–1910
- Spouse: Lester Lonergan (m. 1909; died 1931)

Amy Ricard (January 1, 1882 — August 17, 1937) was an American actress and suffragist.

== Early life ==
Amy Ricard was born in Boston, Massachusetts and raised in Denver, Colorado. Her mother was Emma A. Ricard. She studied acting at the American Academy of Dramatic Arts. She also trained as a soprano singer, with Horton Kennedy.

== Career ==
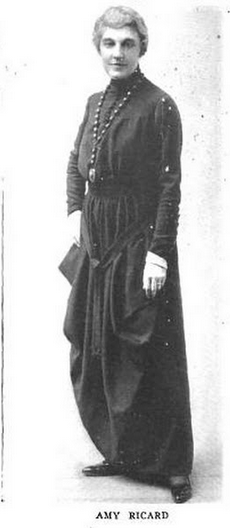
Amy Ricard in The Torches, from a 1917 publication.

Ricard appeared in Broadway in The Pride of Jennico (1900), Janice Meredith (1900–1901), The Stubbornness of Geraldine by Clyde Fitch (1902), Babes in Toyland by Victor Herbert (1903–1904), The College Widow (1904–1905), Mary and John (1905), Matilda (1906–1907), The Literary Sense (1908), The Reckoning (1908), Girls by Clyde Fitch (1908 and 1909), The Torches (1917), The Woman on the Index (1918), and Those Who Walk in Darkness (1919). On the Boston stage, with her husband Lester Lonergan, she starred in An Idyl of Erin (1910).

Dorothy Parker wrote of The Woman on the Index in Vanity Fair, saying "The thing was so well done. You know yourself that with a cast including Julia Dean, Amy Ricard, and Lester Lonergan, you can't really have such a terrible evening."

Amy Ricard made her political views in favor of women's suffrage public, wearing a "Votes for Women" pin and speaking at suffrage events in New York City.

== Personal life ==
Amy Ricard's engagement to poet and editor Charles Hanson Towne was announced in 1908, but she married Irish actor and playwright Lester Lonergan, as his third wife, in 1909. The couple owned a summer cottage on Indian Island in Maine, which was among the buildings removed by the Portland Water District in 1922 to return the island to an undeveloped state. Ricard was widowed in 1931, and she died in 1937, aged 55, in New York City.
