= Junius Henri Browne =

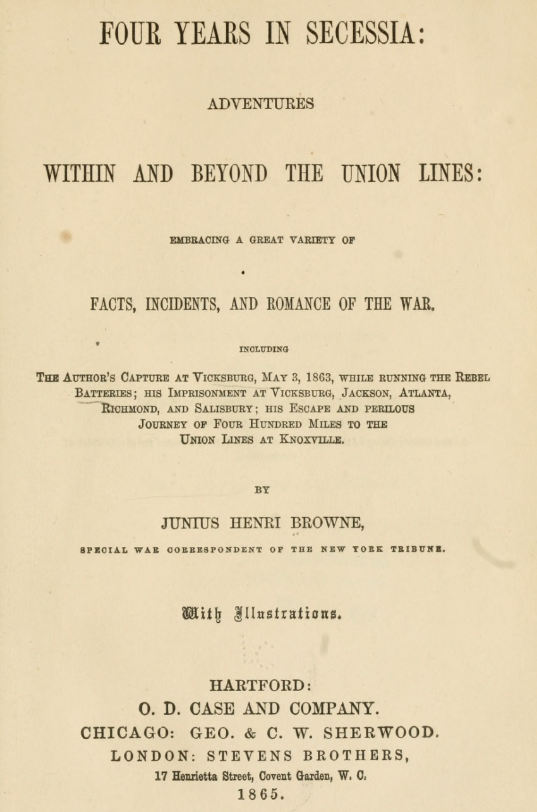
Four years in Seccessia (1865) frontpage

Junius Henri Browne (14 October 1833 Seneca Falls, New York - 2 April 1902 New York City) was an American journalist.

== Biography ==
He was a graduate of Saint Xavier College, Cincinnati. In 1861, he became war correspondent for the New York Tribune, was wounded at Fort Donelson, and taken prisoner while engaged in an abortive expedition to run the Vicksburg batteries.

Browne was imprisoned for 20 months in seven different prisons, confined successively at Vicksburg, Jackson, Atlanta, Richmond, and Salisbury, North Carolina, prisons. On December 18, 1864, Browne escaped from Salisbury, along with journalist Albert Deane Richardson. They traveled together 400 miles through hostile country, and reached the Union lines on January 14, 1865. His list of Union soldiers who died at Salisbury, published in the Tribune, is the only authentic account of their fate.

After the war, he served as correspondent of the New York Tribune, New York Times, and other journals, and contributed many articles to leading periodicals. His best-known works are Four Years in Secessia (1865), The Great Metropolis: A Mirror of New York (1869), and Sights and Sensations in Europe (1872). A series of articles on women, which he wrote for the Galaxy, created a sensation in literary circles. His Four Years in Secessia has descriptions of various incidents of the American Civil War and information concerning the conditions of the Southern prisons and the Northern soldier confined in them.

In August 2013, a new book about Browne and Richardson, Junius and Albert's Adventures in the Confederacy by journalist and author Peter Carlson, was published by PublicAffairs.
