= Sweet Kitty Bellairs (play) =

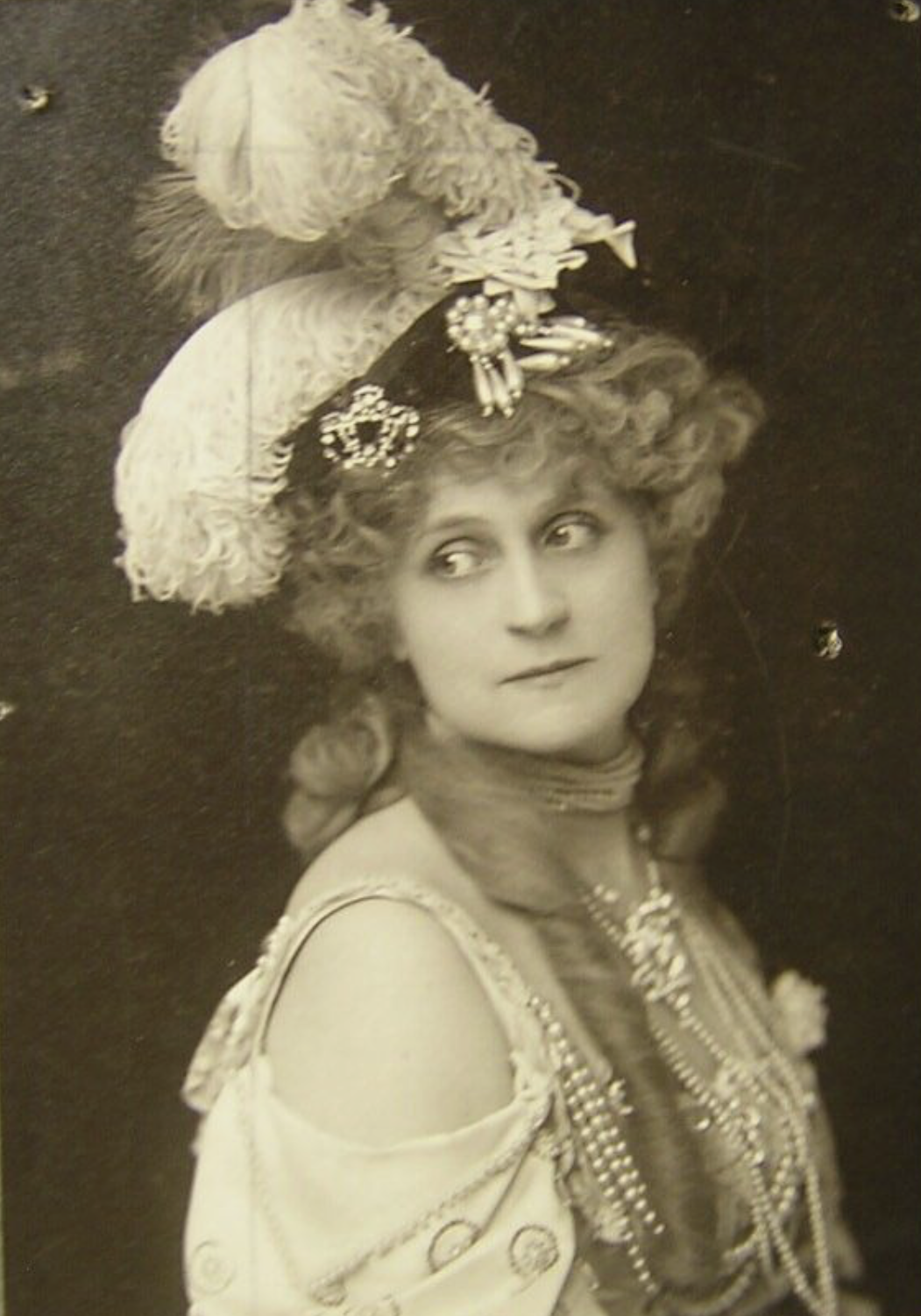
Henrietta Crosman as Kitty Bellairs in 1903

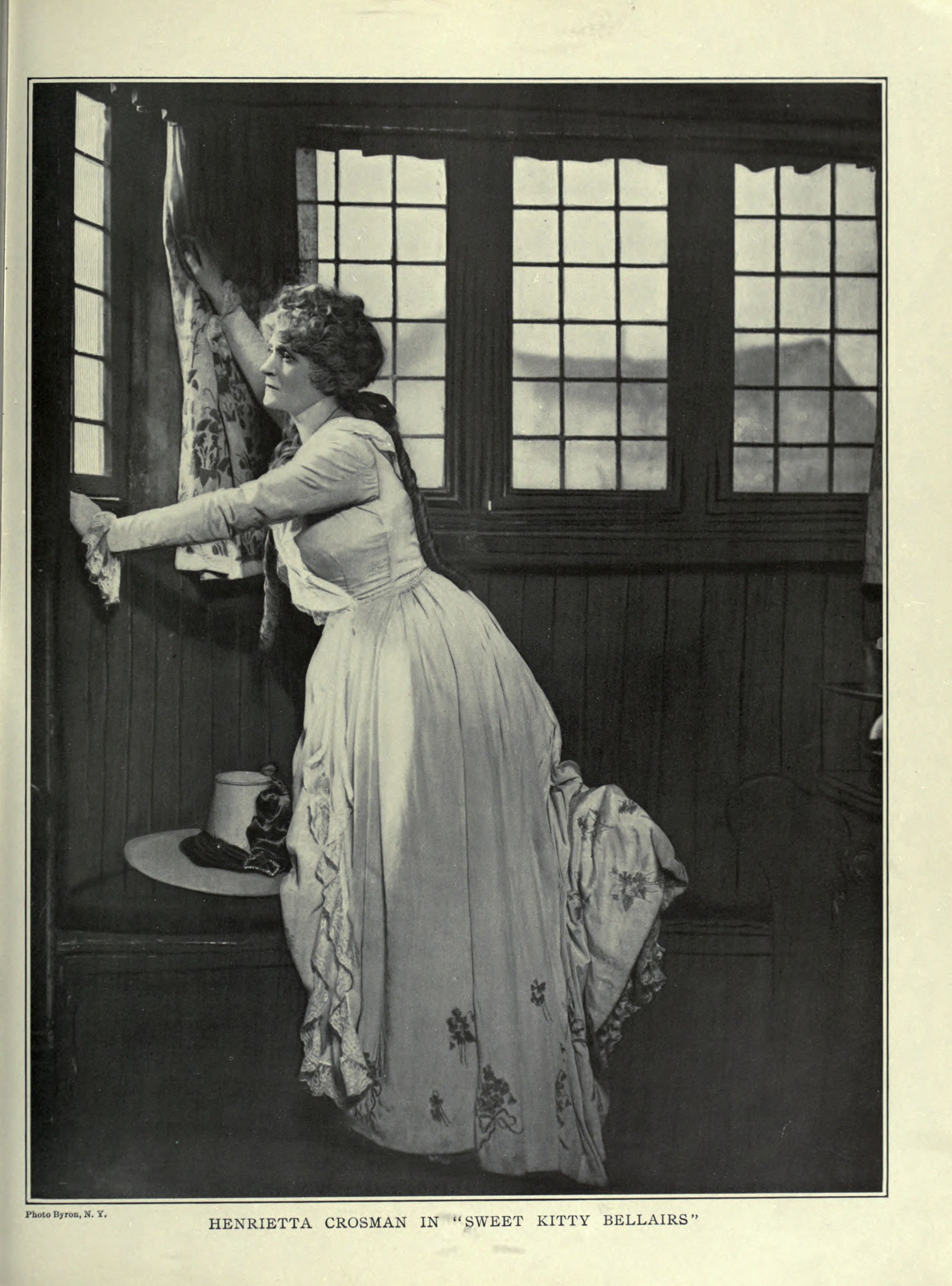
Henrietta Crosman as Kitty Bellairs

Sweet Kitty Bellairs is a play in a prologue and four acts by David Belasco. It is based on the novel The Bath Comedy (1900) by married writing team Agnes and Egerton Castle. The work premiered at the Lafayette Square Opera House in Washington D.C. on November 23, 1903. The production transferred to Broadway; opening at the Belasco Theatre on December 9, 1903. A success, it ran there for a total of 204 performances; closing on June 4, 1904. The production starred Henrietta Crosman in the title role. Others in the cast included Katherine Florence (1874–1952) as Lady Standish, John E. Kellerd (1862–1929) as Lord Standish, Edwin Stevens as Colonel Villiers, Charles Hammond as Lord Verney, and Mark Smith as the Master of Ceremonies among others.

== Adaptations ==
Belasco's play, along with its novel source material, was the basis for two film adaptions which both named themselves after the play. The first was the a 1916 silent film adaptation starring Mae Murray as Kitty Bellairs. It was made by Paramount Pictures and was directed by James Young. The second was a 1930 musical film adaptation directed by Alfred E. Green. Made by Warner Bros., it starred Claudia Dell in the title role.
