= Sweet Kitty Bellairs (1930 film) =

1930 American musical comedy film

- Lobby card
- Directed by: Alfred E. Green
- Written by: Herman Harrison
- Based on: The Bath Comedy by: Agnes Castle and Egerton Castle Sweet Kitty Bellairs; David Belasco (play)
- Starring: Claudia Dell; Walter Pidgeon; Ernest Torrence
- Cinematography: Watkins McDonald
- Edited by: Owen Marks
- Music by: Bobby Dolan; Walter O'Keefe; Rex Dunn; David Mendoza; Leonid S. Leonardi
- Color process: Technicolor Process 3
- Production company: Warner Bros. Pictures
- Distributed by: Warner Bros. Pictures
- Release date: August 9, 1930 (US)
- Running time: 63 minutes
- Country: United States
- Language: English

Sweet Kitty Bellairs is a 1930 American historical musical comedy film directed by Alfred E. Green. The film is based on the 1903 play Sweet Kitty Bellairs by David Belasco. Belasco's play was in turn adapted from the novel The Bath Comedy (1900) by Agnes Castle and Egerton Castle. This novel also served as source material for the 1930 musical film. Shot entirely in Technicolor, the film stars Claudia Dell, Ernest Torrence and, Walter Pidgeon and is set in Bath, England in 1793.

Belasco's 1903 play starred Henrietta Crosman. It was also the basis for a silent film adaptation starring Mae Murray followed in 1916.

== Plot ==
Kitty Bellairs, a famous flirt of her day, comes to Bath for the season. Early on in the film she declares that "in spite of her thirty or forty affairs, I've lost not a bit of my virtue." Her path is strewn with a number of conquests, including an enamored highwayman, a lord and some others who hang on her every word. A highwayman stops her coach as she is on her way to Bath and is immediately raptured by Kitty Bellairs. He trades the loot from the passengers for a kiss from Kitty who feels she should "yield" in order to save the life of Lord Varney, who has gallantly come to defend her honor.

In spite of this, Lord Varney draws his sword and ends up losing the fight when he loses his sword, upon which the highwayman declares, "Blood is not a pretty sight for tender eyes, Retrieve your sword while I go about my business." He proceeds to kiss Kitty who declares she considers herself not to have been kissed at all, upon which the highwayman kisses her several times and slips a ring on her finger leaving her enraptured. Lord Varney, however, is in love with Kitty himself but is extremely bashful and shy. The film then progresses to the city of Bath, where the inhabitants sing an amusing song about their daily lives, and the proceeds to a dance which Kitty is attending. She meets Captain O'Hara who declares his love for her. When Lord Varney approaches and asks for his dance from Kitty, Captain O'Hara declares that "it 'was' his dance" and whisks her away. Lord Varney is approached by his friend who laughs at his shyness.

Nevertheless, Lord Varney declares his love for her and decides to write a love poem to Kitty. The film then proceeds to the next day and we see Kitty being tended to by her maid while chatting with her hairdresser about her three lovers. She describes them and asks his opinion on whom she should choose. The film then proceeds to the house of Lady Julia Standish on whom Kitty is paying a call. Lady Julia's husband is neglecting her and Kitty gives her advice on how to make her husband interested once again. Her husband, Sir Jasper Standish arrives from a trip to find her dressed elegantly as if expecting a caller. Meanwhile, Kitty places a love note addressed to her in a conspicuous place with a lock of red hair and leaves the house. Through a welter of songs into which the principals break at short intervals she at length decides on a lord instead of a highwayman.

Lord Varney, hearing that Kitty was visiting Lady Standish, comes to call on Kitty at Lord Standish's house. Lord Standish immediately assumes that he is fooling around with his wife and insults him so that he must fight a duel "according to the code" in order to uphold his honor. The report of the scandal soon flies through the town and we are taken to a bath where everyone is talking about the supposed affair. Kitty happens to be there and as soon as she hears the story she begins to fear for the life of Lord Varney, whom she now realizes is the one she really loves. Through a welter of songs into which the principals break at short intervals, as well as outrageous Pre-Code comedy, satire and drama, Kitty and Lord Varney are at length united.

=== Pre-Code sequences ===
The film contains several examples of pre-Code humor. In one scene, an obviously gay hairdresser is talking to Kitty Bellairs about her love affairs. Kitty asks him which man she should choose and the hairdresser says she should choose the highwayman because he prefers "a manly man."

In another scene, Kitty teaches her friend how to get her husband to pay attention to her. Her instructions include wearing Parisian negligee and finding another lover.

== Cast ==
- Claudia Dell as Kitty Bellairs
- Walter Pidgeon as Lord Varney
- Ernest Torrence as Sir Jasper Standish
- Perry Askam as Capt. O'Hara
- June Collyer as Lady Julia Standish
- Lionel Belmore as Col. Villiers
- Arthur Edmund Carewe as Capt. Spicer
- Flora Finch as Gossip
- Douglas Gerrard as Tom Stafford
- Christiane Yves as Lydia
- Al Hart as Innkeeper
- Bertram Jones as Verney's Valet
- Tina Marshall as Megrim
- Geoffrey McDonell as Lord Northmore
- Edgar Norton as Lord Markham

== Songs ==
- "You, I Love But You" (Sung by Claudia Dell)
- "I've Been Waiting For You" (Sung by Walter Pidgeon)
- "Drunk Song" (Sung by Ernest Torrence, Lionel Belmore, Edgar Norton)
- "Duelling Song" (Sung by Ernest Torrence, Perry Askam, Lionel Belmore, Edgar Norton, Douglas Gerrard)
- "Peggy's Leg" (Sung by Ernest Torrence, Perry Askam, Lionel Belmore, Edgar Norton, Douglas Gerrard, Arthur Edmund Carewe)
- "Highwayman Song" (Sung by Perry Askam and Claudia Dell)
- "Pump Room Song" (Sung by Claudia Dell)
- "Song of the Town of Bath" (Sung by Extras)
- "Tally Ho" (Sung by Claudia Dell, Walter Pidgeon, Lionel Belmore)

== Preservation status ==
The film survives in a black-and-white nitrate copy. No copies of the film are known to exist in the original Technicolor. The color work on the film was highly praised by the film reviewers of the day.

== See also ==
- List of early color feature films
