= Thomas Heath Robinson =

English illustrator of books and magazines

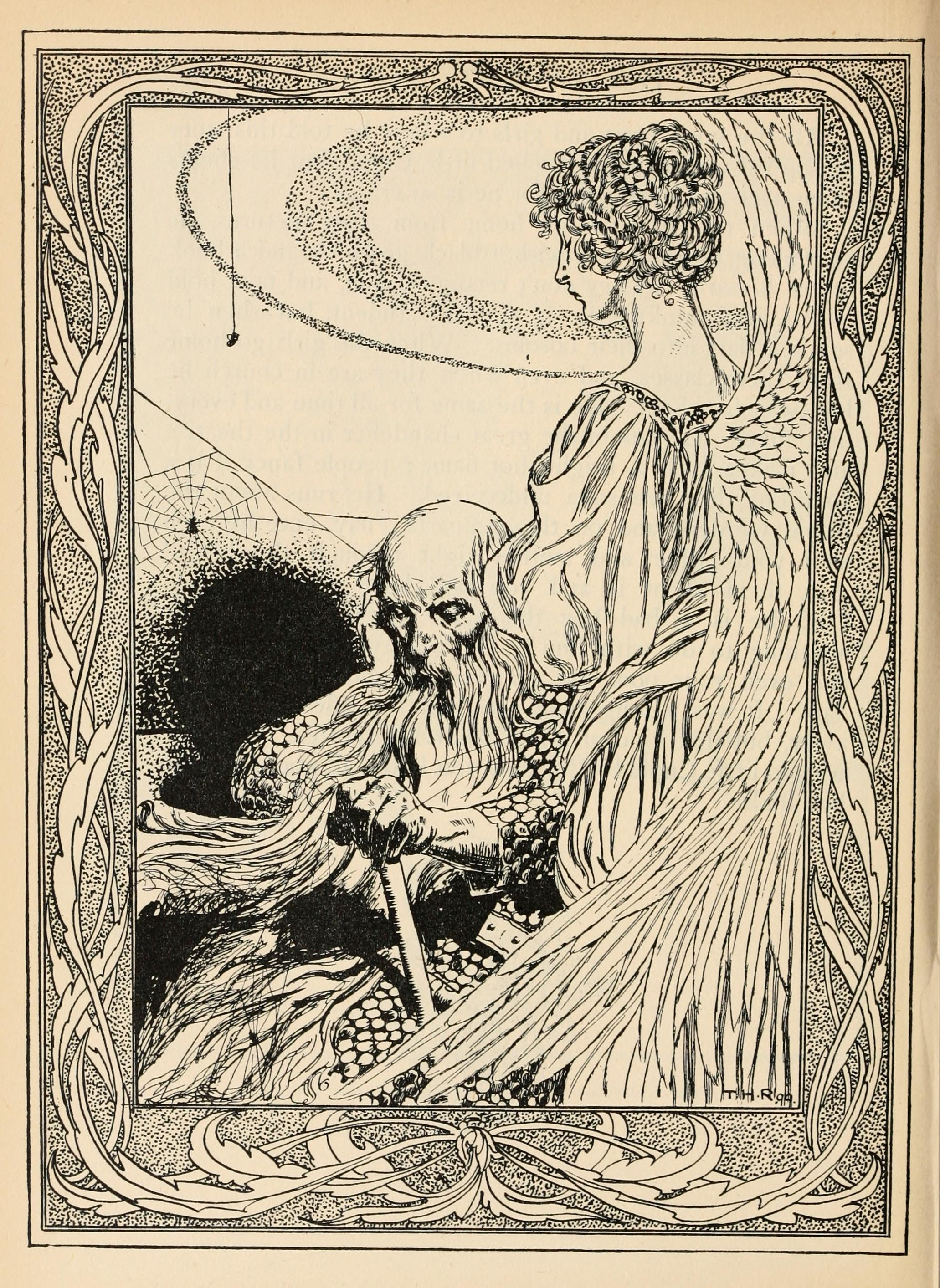
Illustration for "Holger the Dane", from Fairy tales from Hans Christian Andersen by Thomas Heath Robinson (1899)

T. Heath Robinson (1869–1954) was an English illustrator of books and magazines, in both line drawings and full colour. He illustrated many books for Allen, Nisbit, Dent, Sands and others as well as illustrations for magazines, including Cassell's Family Magazine, The Idler, Pall Mall Magazine and The Strand.

Robinson was born in London in 1869 the son of engraver Thomas Robinson (1838–1902), He attended the Islington School of Art. His younger brothers Charles and W. Heath (or Heath Robinson) were illustrators.
