= Charles Robinson (illustrator) =

British book illustrator

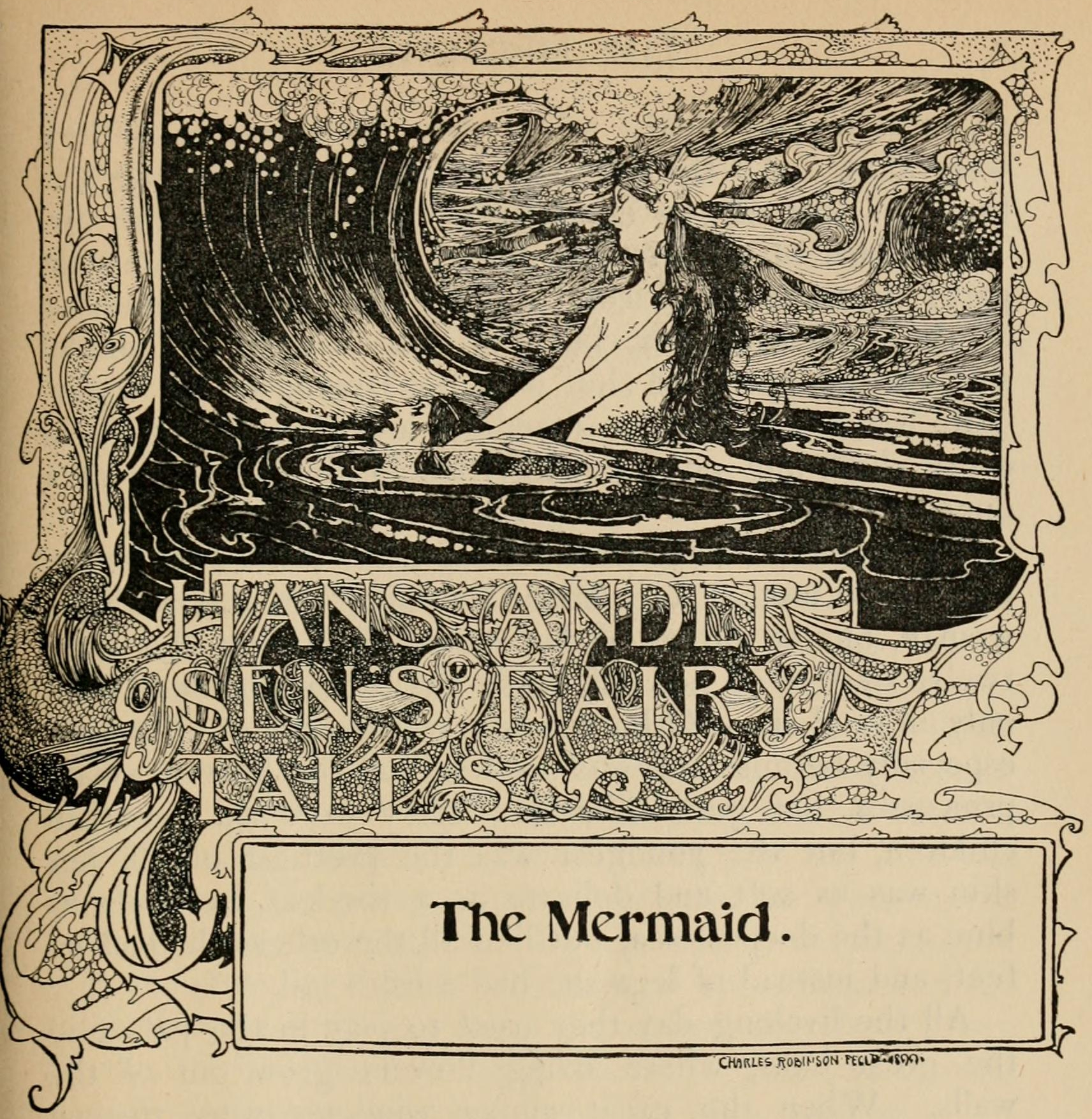
The Mermaid (1899)

Charles Robinson (1870–1937) was a prolific British book illustrator.

== Biography ==
Born in Islington, London, in October 1870, he was the son of illustrator Thomas Robinson, and his brothers Thomas Heath Robinson and William Heath Robinson also became illustrators. He served an apprenticeship as a printer and took art lessons in the evenings. He won a place at the Royal Academy in 1892 but was unable to take it up due to lack of finances.

The first full book he illustrated was Robert Louis Stevenson's A Child's Garden of Verses (1896) which includes over 100 pen and ink drawings. It was extremely popular, going through many reprints, and generated numerous commissions. He illustrated many fairy tales, children's books and books written by Walter Copeland Jerrold and himself throughout his career. He was also an active painter, especially in later life, and was elected to the Royal Institute of Painters in Water Colours in 1932.

Robinson married Edith Mary Favatt in 1897 in Middlesex, England and they were the parents of four daughters and two sons.

== Works Illustrated ==
- Aesop Fables (1895)
- Robert Louis Stevenson A Child's Garden of Verses (1896)
- Edith Carrington Animals in the Wrong Places (1896)
- H. D. Lowry Make Believe (1896)
- Gabriel Setoun The Child World (1896)
- Eugene Field's Lullaby Land (1897)
- Nancy Bell Dobbie's Little Master (1897)
- Barrington Macgregor King Longbeard (1898)
- W. E. Cule's Child Voices (1899)
- William Brighty Rands Lilliput Lyrics (1899)
- George Sand The Master Mosaic Workers (1899)
- Friedrich de la Motte Fouqué's Sintram and His Companions (1900)
- J. J. Bell Jack of all Trades (1900)
- The New Noah's Ark (1900)
- William Canton The True Annals of Fairyland (1900)
- Percy Dearmer The Little Lives of the Saints (1900)
- Norman Garstin The Suitors Of Aprille (1900)
- Homer The Adventures of Odysseus (1900)
- Friedrich de la Motte Fouqué Aslauga's Knight (1900)
- Charles Perrault Tales of Passed Times (1900)
- George Sand The Master Mosaic Workers (1900)
- Henry de Vere Stacpoole Pierrette (1900)
- Ernest Rhys The True Annals of Fairyland (1901)
- The Reign of King Cole (1901)
- A Book of Days for Little Ones (1901)
- Walter Copeland The Farm Book (1901)
- Claire Bridgman The Book of Shops (1902)
- Walter Copeland The Book of the Zoo (1902)
- The Shopping Day (1902)
- John Henry Burn The Mother's Book of Song (1902)
- Walter Jerrold Nonsense! Nonsense! (1902)
- The Coronation Autograph Book (1902)
- Walter Jerrold The Big Rook of Nursery Rhymes (1903)
- Siegfried: A Romance founded on Wagner's Operas (1904)
- Douglas William Jerrold Fireside Saints (1904)
- A Bookful of Fun (1905)
- The Black Cat Book (1905)
- The Book of Ducks and Dutchies (1905)
- The Book of the Dutch Dolls (1905)
- The Book of the Fan (1905)
- The Book of the Little JDs (1905)
- The Book of the Mandarinfants (1905)
- The Book of the Little Dutch Dots (1905)
- The Hundred Best Blank Verse Passages in the English Language (1905)
- Isaac Henry Wallis The Cloud Kingdom (1905)
- The Child's Christmas (1906)
- The Silly Submarine (1906)
- The Book of Dolly's Doings (1906)
- Bouncing Babies (1906)
- The Book of Dolly's House (1906)
- The Book of Dolly Land (1906)
- Awful Airship (1906)
- Mad Motor (1906)
- Katharine Tynan Little Book of Courtesies (1906)
- The Sweet Shop (1907)
- The Toy Shop (1907)
- The Cake Shop (1907)
- Black Bunnies (1907)
- Black Doggies (1907)
- Black Sambos (1907)
- Lewis Carroll Alice's Adventures in Wonderland (1907)
- Evelyn Sharp The Story of the Weathercock (1907)
- Babes and Blossoms (1908)
- The Book of Other people (1908)
- The Book of Sailors (1908)
- The Book of Soldiers (1908)
- Walter Jerrold The True Annals of Fairyland in the Reign of King Aberon (1909)
- Grimm's Fairy Tales (1910)
- Ruth Arkwright Brownikins and Other Fancies (1910)
- Jessie Pope Babes and Birds (1910)
- Netta Syrett The Vanishing Princess (1910)
- The Dolly Scouts (1911)
- Frances Hodgson Burnett's The Secret Garden (1911)
- The Sensitive Plant (1911)
- My Book about Australia (1912)
- Alice Talwin Morris My Book about New Zealand (1912)
- William Blake Songs of Innocence (1912)
- Anatole France Bee, The Princess of the Dwarfs (1912)
- Emily Handasyde The Four Gardens (1912)
- Walter Jerrold The Big Book of Fables (1912)
- Jessie Pope Babes and Beasts (1912)
- Henry Fielding Margaret's Book (1913)
- W. J. Minnion Topsy Turvey (1913)
- Charles Perrault Fairy Tales (1913)
- E. Temple Thurston The Open Window (1913)
- Oscar Wilde The Happy Prince and Other Tales (1913)
- Agnes and Egerton Castle Our Sentimental Garden (1914)
- Alice Talwin Morris A Child's Book of Empire (1914)
- Songs and Sonnets by William Shakespeare (1915)
- Robert Herrick (1915)
- Evelyn Sharp What Happened at Christmas (1915)
- The Story of Prince Ahmed (1915)
- Frances Hodgson Burnett The Little Hunchback Zia (1916)
- Phyllis Austin The Goldfish Bowl (1918)
- Bridget's Fairies (1919)
- M. Elsie Gullick Teddy's Year with the Fairies (1920)
- Grace Rhys The Children's Garland of Verse (1921)
- J. G. Stevenson Father Time Stories (1921)
- Doris and David Alone (1922)
- Brenda Girvin and Monica Cosens Wee Men (1923)
- A. A. Milne Once on a Time (1925)
- Mother Goose Nursery Rhymes (1928)
- The Rubaiyat of Omar Khayyam (1928)
- Jennie Dunbar Young Hopeful (1932)

== Gallery ==
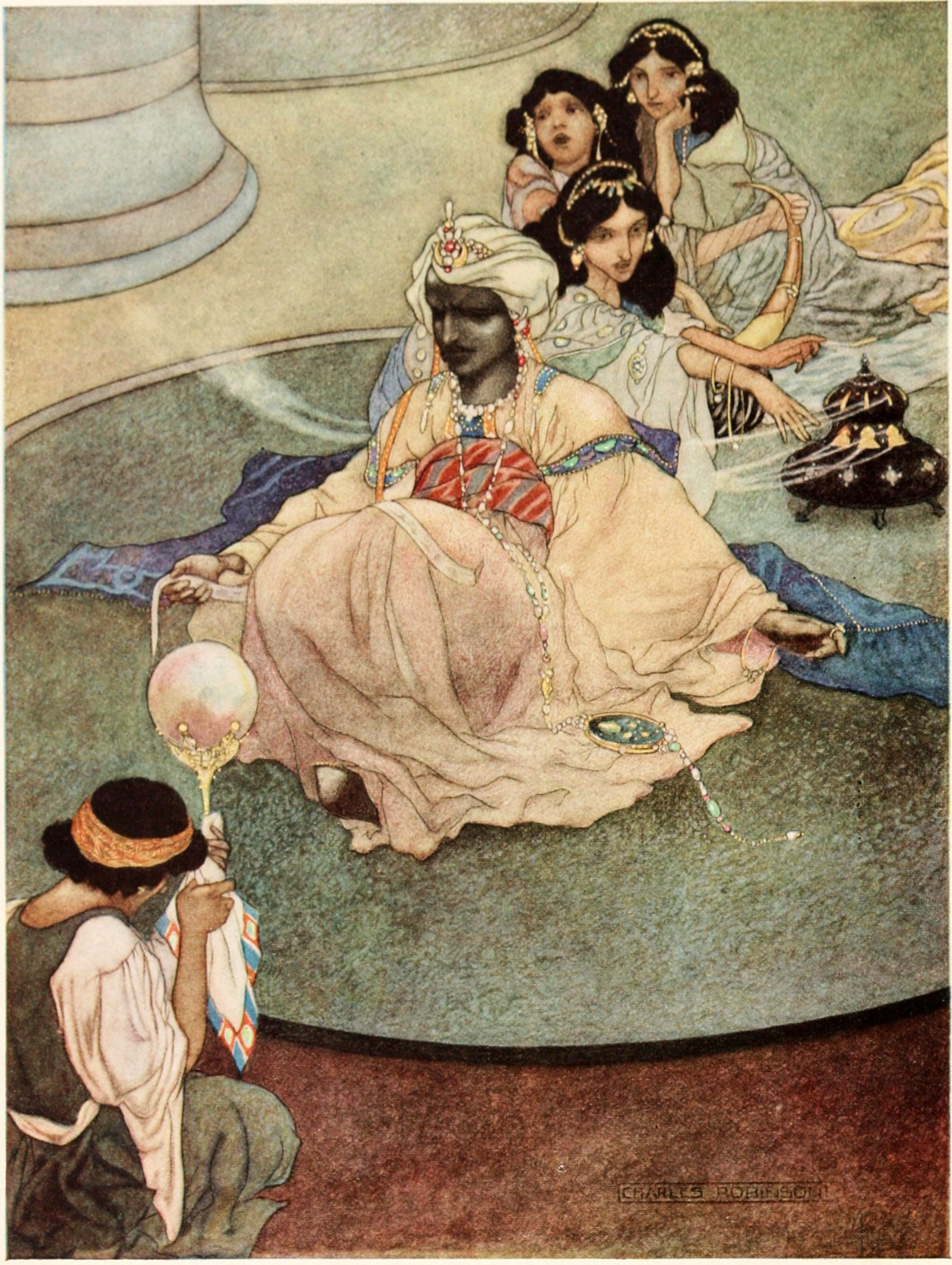
The Happy Prince (1913)

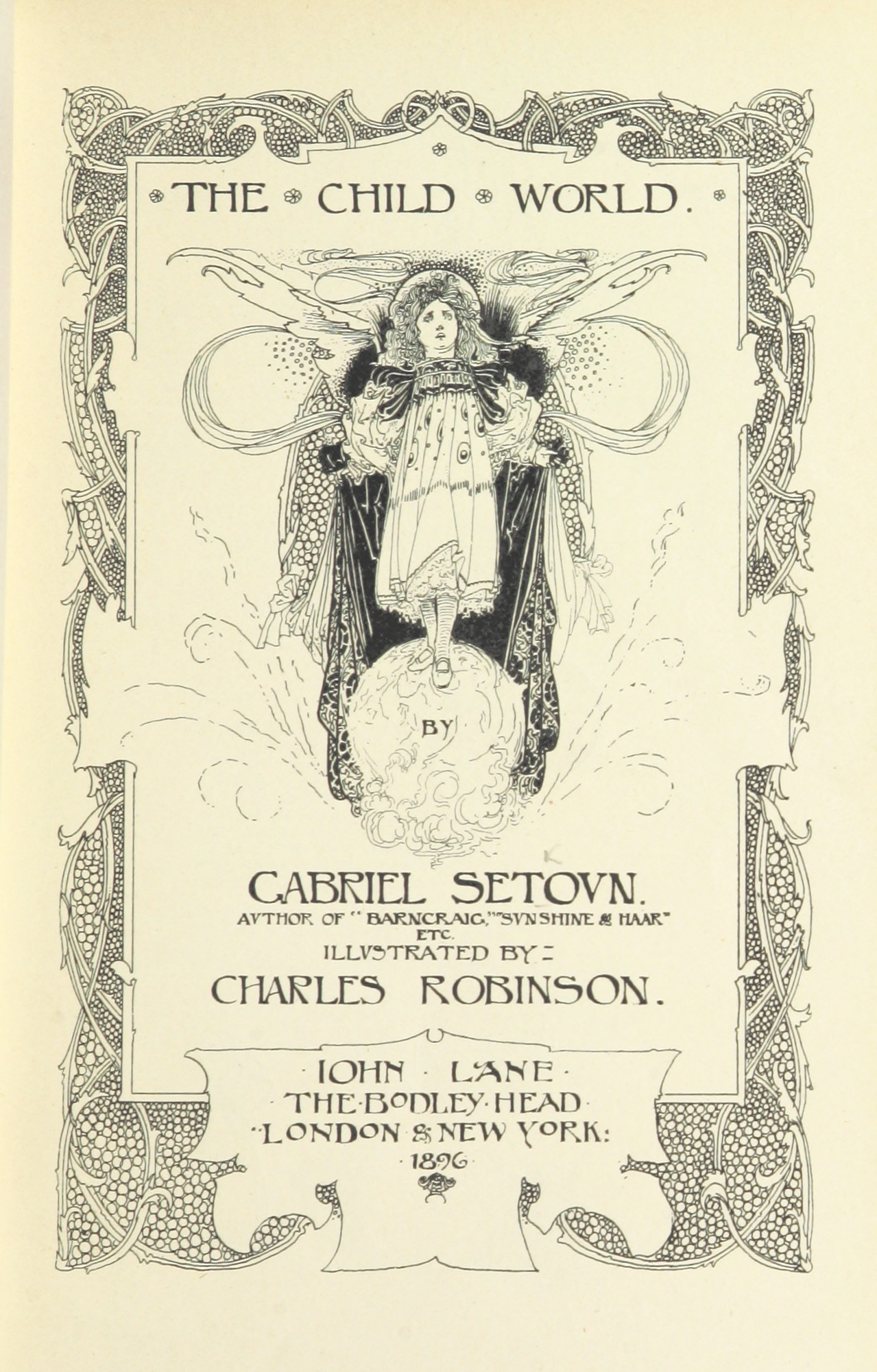
Child World (1896)

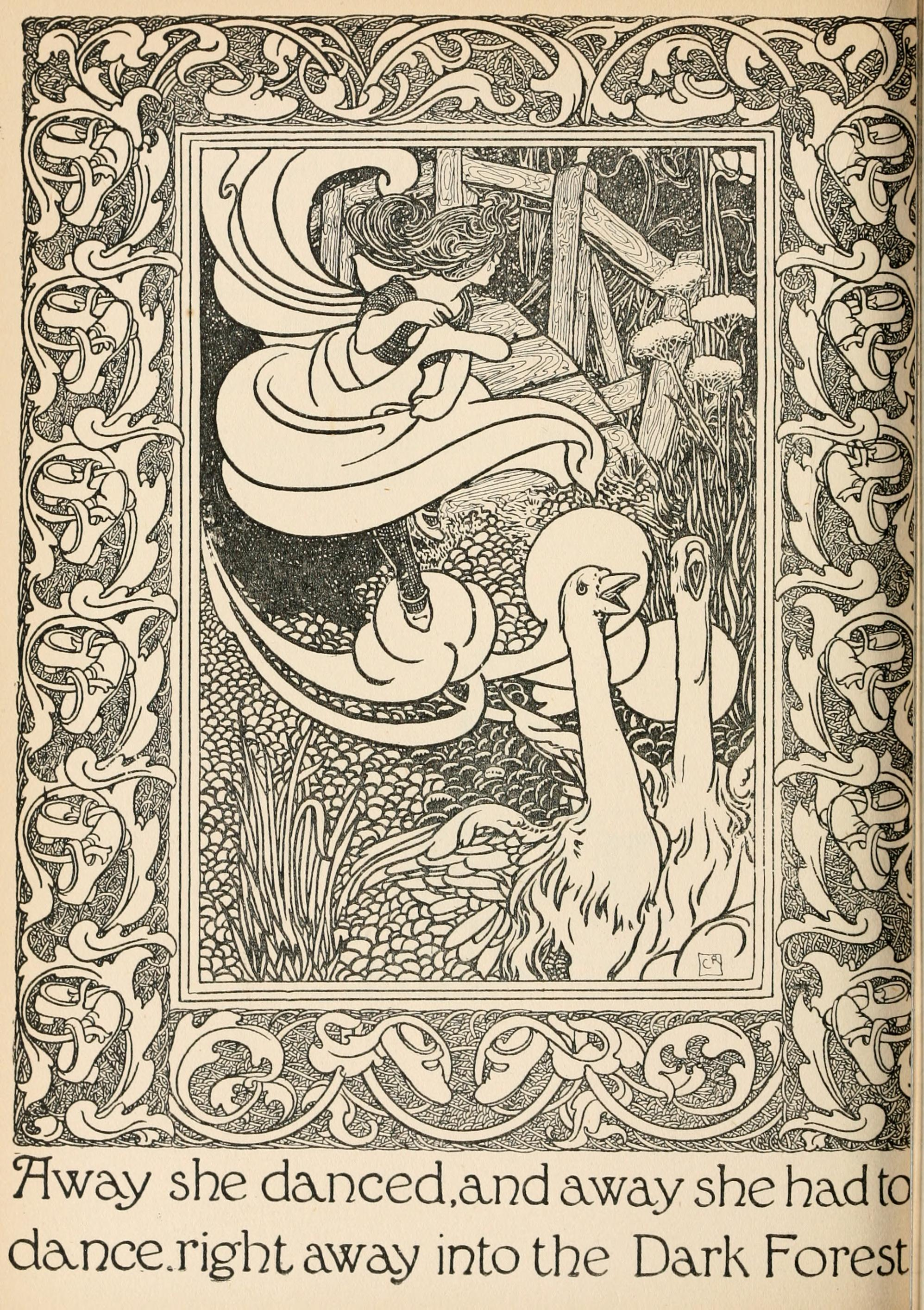
The Red Shoes (1899)

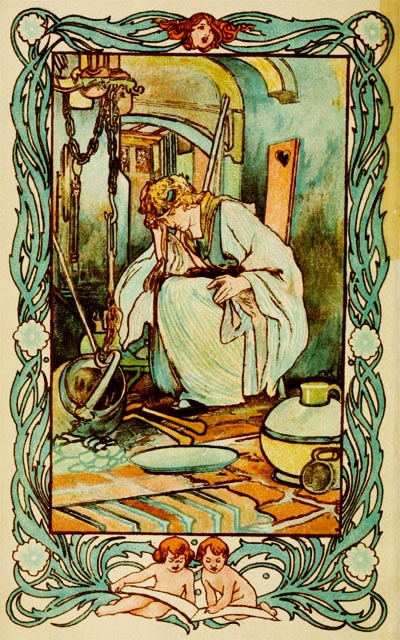
Cinderella (1900)

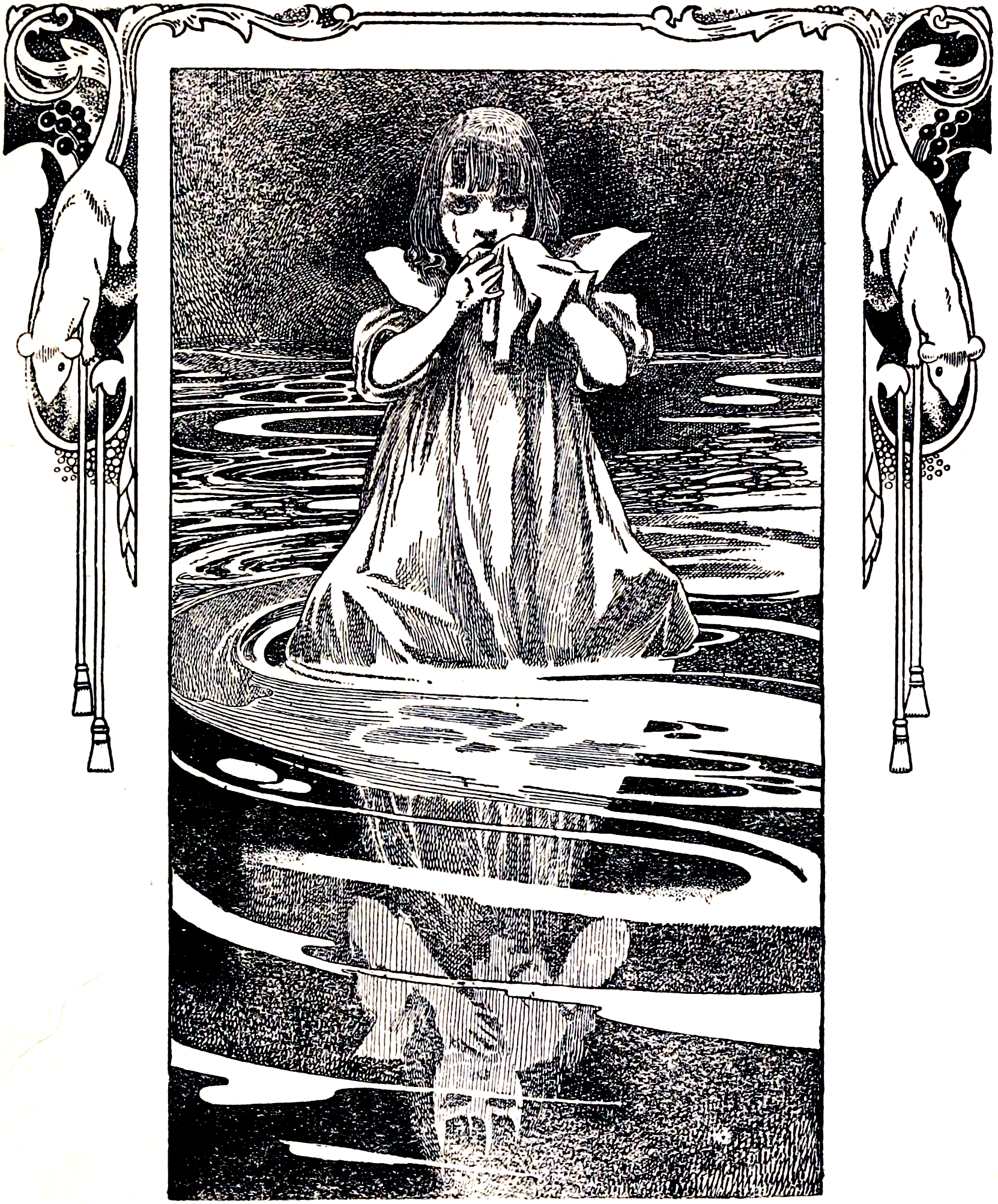
Alice in Wonderland (1907)

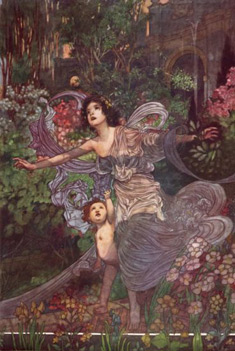
Sensitive Plant (1911)

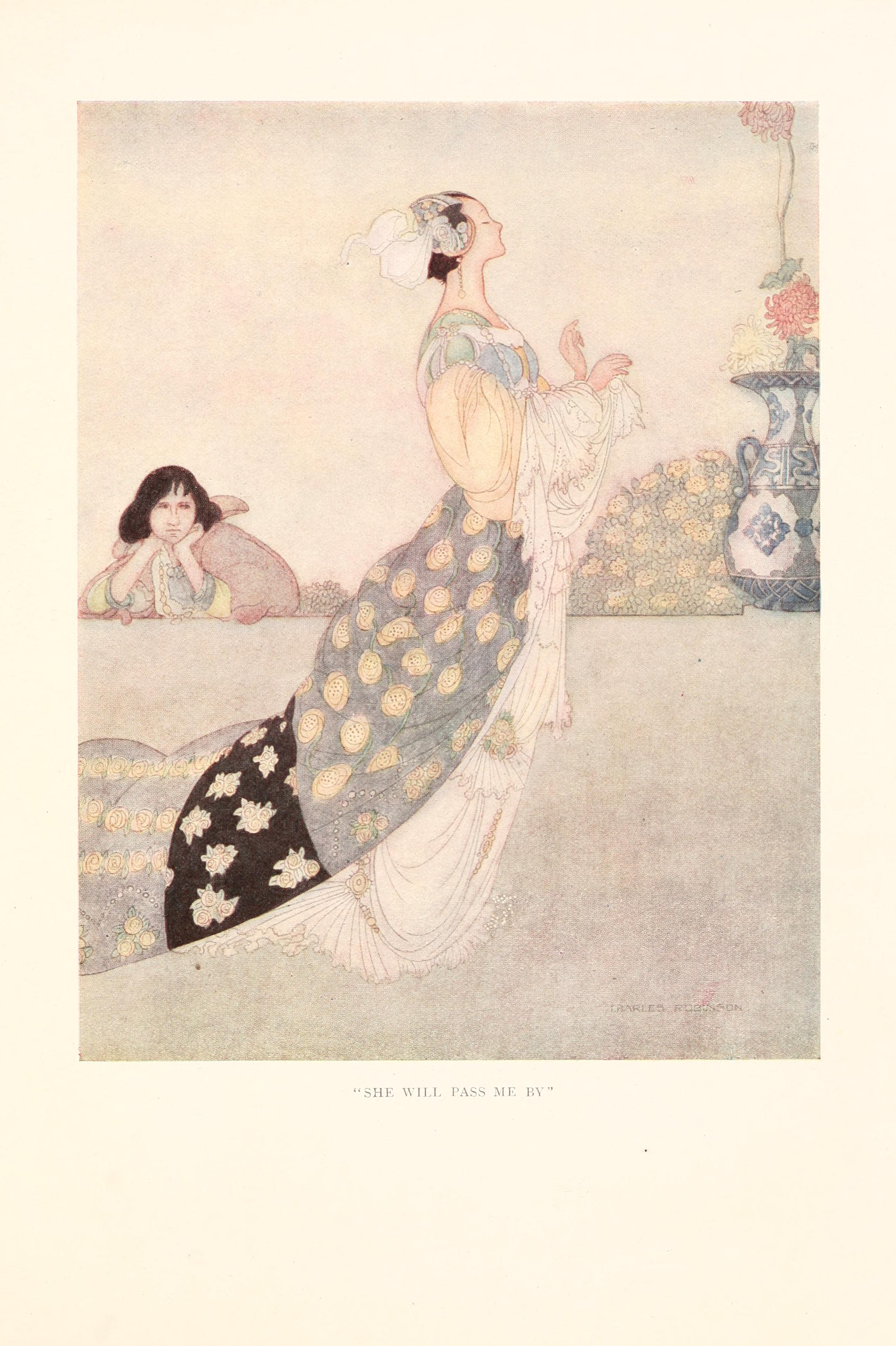
She will pass me by (1913)

== Biography ==
Charles Robinson by Leo de Freitas. London: Academy Editions; New York: St. Martins Press, 1976. ISBN 0-85670-277-3. ISBN 0-85670-282-X (pbk.).
