= Once on a Time =

1917 fairy tale by A.A. Milne

Cover of the first edition, published by Hodder & Stoughton.

Once on a Time is a fairy tale novel by English writer A. A. Milne. The first edition was published in 1917 with illustrations by H. M. Brock. The 1922 American edition was illustrated by Charles Robinson, with a colour-plate frontispiece and black-and-white line drawings, and included a preface by the author.

Milne's preface begins "This is an odd book". Ostensibly a typical fairytale, it tells the story of the war between the kingdoms of Euralia and Barodia and the political shenanigans which take place in Euralia in the king's absence, all supposedly rewritten by Milne from the writings of the fictional historian "Roger Scurvilegs".

Milne created the story to contain believable, three-dimensional characters, rather than the stereotypes which will satisfy children. Hence the book introduces us to a princess who is far from helpless; a prince who, whilst handsome, is also pompous and vain; an enchantment which is almost entirely humorous; a villain who is not entirely villainous and receives no real comeuppance; a good king who is not always good; an evil king who is not always evil, and so on.

The book was written by Milne in 1915, partly for the amusement of his wife.

== Plot summary ==
When the King of Barodia receives a pair of seven-league boots as a birthday present, his first barely controlled attempts to use the boots has him flying over the King of Euralia's castle more than eighteen times during breakfast. This naturally provokes a series of incidents which escalate into war. While the King of Euralia is away, his daughter Hyacinth tries to rule in his stead and counter the Machiavellian ambitions of the king's favourite, the Countess Belvane.

== Characters ==
- King Merriwig of Euralia: fat, jolly if occasionally pompous and easily led. He nevertheless can show great strength of mind, as related in an anecdote in which he outwitted a fairy, mostly by sheer stubbornness.
- Princess Hyacinth: Merriwig's daughter. Rather more savvy than her father, she is nevertheless at first out of her depth when trying to rule the kingdom in his absence. Despite this, she grows into the role.
- The King of Barodia: Bombastic, proud and arrogant, he takes inordinate pride in his moustache.
- The Countess Belvane: A difficult character. Beautiful, proud and haughty, she is inclined to melodramatics and emotional self-indulgence. Ostensibly the villain of the piece, her motives are complex and subtle. (Note the word play on "belle" and "vain" in the name of the Countess.)
- Lady Wiggs: Hyacinth's closest friend; helpful and dreamy.
- Lady Woggs: A palace servant; well-meaning but terribly dim.
- Prince Udo of Araby: Prince of a neighbouring realm, invited by Hyacinth to help her in her troubles with Belvane. He turns out to be very little help at all, partly due to suffering an embarrassing enchantment, but mostly due to his susceptibility to Belvane's flattery.
- Duke Coronel: Udo's companion-at-arms and best friend. Far more laid-back and likeable than the prince.
- Roger Scurvilegs: noted historian of Euralia, author of the monumental work Euralia Past and Present. The narrator gives him credit for the basic facts of the story whilst gently lampooning him for his stuffiness.

== Themes and issues ==
Milne himself resisted characterising the book. In his foreword to the 1922 edition he wrote of it:

For whom, then, is the book intended? That is the trouble. Unless I can say, "For those, young or old, who like the things which I like," I find it difficult to answer. Is it a children's book? Well, what do we mean by that? Is The Wind in the Willows a children's book? Is Alice in Wonderland? Is Treasure Island? These are masterpieces which we read with pleasure as children, but with how much more pleasure when we are grown-up. In any case, what do we mean by "children"? A boy of three, a girl of six, a boy of ten, a girl of fourteen - are they all to like the same thing? And is a book "suitable for a boy of twelve" any more likely to please a boy of twelve than a modern novel is likely to please a man of thirty-seven; even if the novel be described truly as "suitable for a man of thirty-seven"? I confess that I cannot grapple with these difficult problems. But I am very sure of this: that no one can write a book which children will like, unless he write it for himself first. That being so, I shall say boldly that this is a story for grown-ups. [...] But, as you see, I am still finding it difficult to explain just what sort of book it is. Perhaps no explanation is necessary. Read in it what you like; read it to whomever you like; be of what age you like; it can only fall into one of the two classes. Either you will enjoy it, or you won't. It is that sort of book.
