= M. E. Francis =

Novelist

M.E. Francis
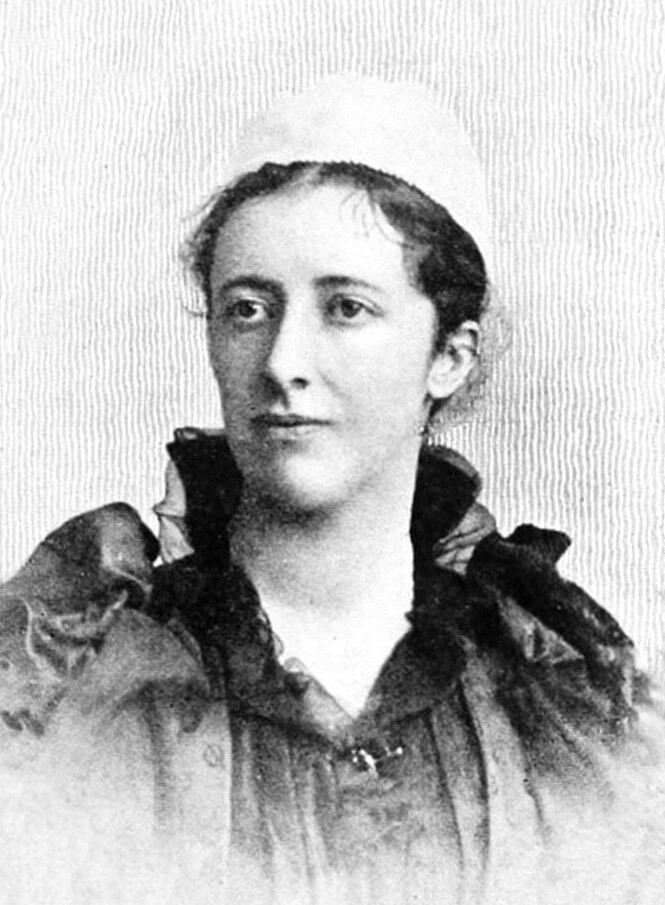
- Born: Mary Elizabeth Sweetman; 1859; Killiney Park, County Dublin
- Died: 9 March 1930
- Occupation: Writer
- Writing career
- Pen name: M. E. Francis; Mary E. Francis; Mary Elizabeth Blundell

M. E. Francis was the pen name of Mary Elizabeth Blundell (née Sweetman; 1859 – 9 March 1930) who was a prolific Irish novelist. She was described as the best known woman novelist of the day.

== Biography ==
Mary Elizabeth Sweetman was born at Killiney Park, County Dublin to Michael James Sweetman (1829-1864), of Lamberton Park, Queen's County, JP, High Sheriff of Queen's County in 1852, and (Mary) Margaret, only child and heir of Michael Powell, of Fitzwilliam Square, Dublin. She had two brothers and three sisters. The Sweetman family were landed gentry of Longtown, County Kildare, and per family tradition were "long settled in Dublin" and "previously resident near Callan and Newtown, County Kilkenny", tracing their line back to the mid-1500s. After her father's death, when she was a small child, the remaining family moved to Brussels in 1873 and she spent her summers in Switzerland. Her sisters, Agnes Sweetman and Elinor Sweetman were also writers.

She married Colonel Francis Nicholas Blundell (1853-1884) on 18 November 1879, and moved to Little Crosby, where his family had been notable Catholics since the 16th century. They had one son, the politician Francis Blundell, and two daughters, Margaret Elizabeth Clementina Mary and Agnes Mary Frances Blundell, MBE, both also writers. Her husband died after only five years of marriage, and she moved in with the Blundell family at Crosby Hall.

Blundell had written her first story when she was eight (‘True Joy’) and had a publication in the Irish Monthly the day of her wedding. She took up writing professionally after her husband's death, using his firstname as her penname. In later life she wrote in collaboration with her daughters. She later retired to Dorset, and then to Mold in Wales, where she died in 1930. She is buried in Crosby.

According to Edwardian Fiction: An Oxford Companion (1997), "The Ireland of her youth, the Lancashire of her married life, and the Dorset of her retirement provided backgrounds for many of her volumes of fiction."

== Bibliography ==
- The Little Rosary of the Sacred Heart (M. H. Gill 1886)
- Whither?: A Novel, 3 vols. (Griffith & Farran 1892), (Griffith & Farran 1893)
- In a North Country Village (Osgood & McIlwaine 1893), (1896)
- The Story of Dan (Osgood & McIlwaine 1894)
- Town Mice in the Country: A Story of Holiday Adventure (Blackie & Son 1894)
- A Daughter of the Soil (Times Novels Series] (Osgood & McIlwaine 1896)
- Frieze and Fustian (Osgood & McIlwaine 1895), (1896)
- Among the Untroden Ways (Blackwood & Son 1896)
- Maime o’ the Corner (Harper & Bros. 1898)
- Miss Erin (Methuen & Co. 1898; Benizer 1898)
- The Duenna of a Genius (Harper & Bros. 1898), (Bernhard Tauchnitz 1899), (T. Nelson & Sons 1907)
- Yeoman Fleetwood (Longmans & Co. 1900)
- Pastorals of Dorset (Longmans & Co. 1901)
- Fiander’s Widow (Longmans & Co 1901)
- The Forest Hut (The Lady's Realm, Vol XI, Hutchinson & Co, November 1901)
- North, South, and Over the Sea (Geo. Newnes 1902)
- The Manor Farm: A Novel (Longmans & Co. 1902)
- Christian Thal (Longmans & Co. 1903)
- Lychgate Hall: A Romance (Longmans & Co. 1904)
- Dorset Dear (Longmans & Co. 1905)
- Wild Wheat: A Dorset Romance (Longmans, Green & Co. 1905)
- The Lord’s Ambassador, and Other Tales (CTS 1905)
- Father Anselm and Other Stories (CTS 1905)
- Simple Annals (Longmans & Co. 1906)
- Stepping Westward (Methuen & Co. 1907)
- Children of Light and Other Stories (CTS 1907)
- Margery o’ the Mill (Methuen & Co. 1907)
- Hardy-on-the-Hill (Methuen & Co. 1908)
- Madge Make-the-Best-of-It (St Nicholas Series 1908)
- Galatea of the Wheatfield (Methuen and Co. 1909)
- Noblesse Oblige (John Long 1909)
- The Wild Heart (Smith, Elder 1910)
- The Tender Passion (John Long 1910)
- Gentleman Roger (Sands & Co. 1911)
- Honesty (Hodder & Stoughton 1912)
- Our Alty (John Long 1912), (1914; 1921)
- The Story of Mary Dunne (John Murray 1913)
- Molly’s Fortunes (Sands & Co. 1913)
- The Child’s Book of Prayers in Time of War (R. & T. Washbourne 1914);
- Dark Rosaleen (Cassell & Co. 1915)
- Penton’s Captain (Chapman & Hall 1916)
- Little Pilgrims to Our Lady of Lourdes (Burns & Oates 1917)
- A Maid o’ Dorset (Cassell & Co. 1917)
- The Things of a Child (W. Collins & Sons 1918)
- Beck of Beckford (Allen & Unwin 1920)
- Rosanna Dew (Odhams 1920)
- Renewal (Allen & Unwin 1921)
- Mary Waters (Hutchinson 1921)
- The Runaway (Hutchinson & Co. 1923)
- Lady Jane and the Smallholders, with Margaret Blundell (Hutchinson & Co., 1924)
- Young Davis Wife (Hutchinson & Co 1924)
- Cousin Christopher (T. Fisher Unwin 1925), (Phoenix Publ. n.d.)
- Golden Sally, with Agnes Blundell (Sands & Co. 1925; B. Herder Book Co., 1925)
- Young Dave’s Wife: A Novel (Hutchinson (1924])
- Napoleon of the Looms (Hutchinson & Co. (1925])
- Idylls of Old Hungary (Sheed & Ward 1926)
- Tyrer’s Lass, with Agnes Blundell (Sands & Co. 1926)
- Mossoo; A Comedy of a Lancashire Village (Hutchinson & Co. (1927])
- The Evolution of Aenome (Hutchinson & Co. 1928)
- Wood Sanctuary, with Margaret Blundell (Allen & Unwin 1930)
- Hannie and Father Pat (CTSI 1935)
