= Albert D. Richardson =

American journalist, spy, and author (1833–1869)

Albert Deane Richardson
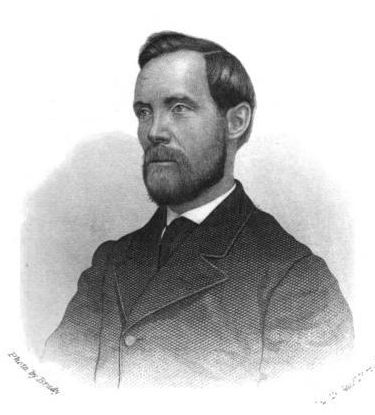
- Portrait from The Secret Service (1865).
- Born: October 6, 1833; Franklin, Massachusetts, U.S.
- Died: December 2, 1869 (aged 36); New York City, New York, U.S.
- Spouses: Mary Louise Pease (m. 1855; died 1864); Abby Sage McFarland (m. 1869)

Albert Deane Richardson (October 6, 1833 – December 2, 1869) was a well-known American journalist, Union spy, and author. He wrote a book about his own experiences and a biography of Ulysses S. Grant. Richardson was shot on two occasions, the second time fatally, by a jealous husband of the woman Richardson was in love with.

== Timeline ==
- Born in Franklin, Massachusetts, October 6, 1833
- Obtained first job with newspaper, Pittsburgh Commercial Journal, 1851.
- Married Mary Louise Pease, April 1855.
- Correspondent for the Boston Journal, 1857.
- Edited The Western Mountaineer of Golden City, Colorado, 1860.
- Journalist for the New York Daily Tribune.
- Captured by the Confederates at Vicksburg, May 3, 1863.
- Wife and daughter died.
- Escaped Salisbury, North Carolina, prison, December 18, 1864.
- Shot by Daniel McFarland, March 14, 1867.
- Wrote Through to the Pacific for the New York Tribune, May–June, 1869.
- Shot again by Daniel McFarland, November 25, 1869.
- Married Abby Sage McFarland, November, 1869; marriage performed by Henry Ward Beecher.
- Died December 2, 1869 (McFarland acquitted in a sensational trial).

== Civil War imprisonment and escape ==
Richardson wrote for the New York Tribune owned by Horace Greeley, and traveled to battlefields during the American Civil War to report on the war, often with fellow journalist Junius Henri Browne.

Richardson and Browne were imprisoned for 20 months in seven different prisons, confined successively at Vicksburg, Jackson, Atlanta, Richmond, and Salisbury, North Carolina, prisons. On December 18, 1864, after 20 months of imprisonment, he escaped from Salisbury, along with Browne. They traveled together more than 400 miles through hostile country, and reached the Union lines on January 14, 1865. His list of Union soldiers who died at Salisbury, published in the Tribune, is the only authentic account of their fate.

== A Tragic Affair ==
Richardson was one of the best known reporters of his age, due to his abilities as a writer and his services (during the American Civil War) as a Union spy. His reputation is recalled as the victim of a homicide that gained considerable notoriety in the Gilded Age.

Richardson's wife and daughter died during the war, and he subsequently met Abby Sage McFarland, an actress married to Daniel McFarland. McFarland claimed to be a major businessman and politician, but basically he was a violent husband and alcoholic with connections with Tammany Hall. Richardson and Abby Sage McFarland lived together, their friends and acquaintances (including Horace Greeley) understanding Richardson was protecting the woman he loved while she was trying to get a divorce, something that was not well received generally by the public in the 1860s.

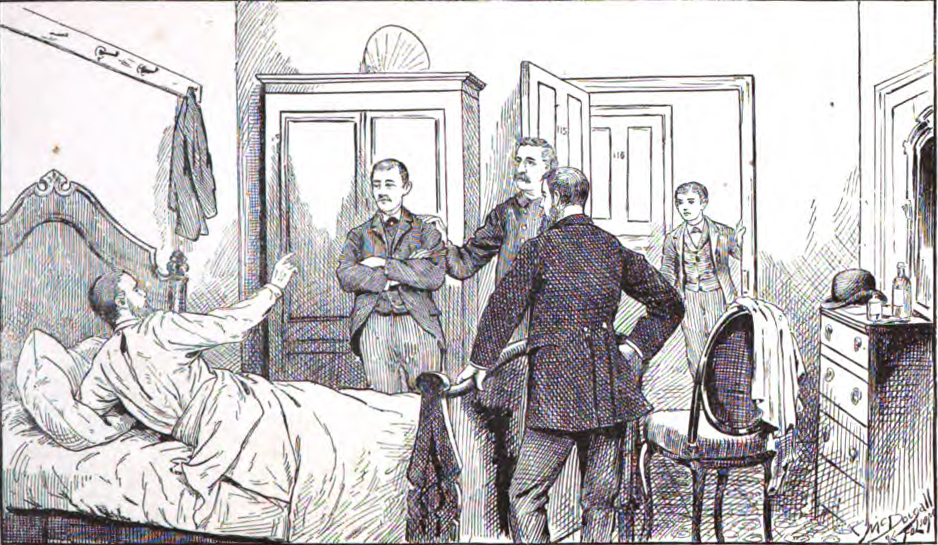
Allaire stands guard over Daniel McFarland as Albert D. Richardson identifies him as his murderer.

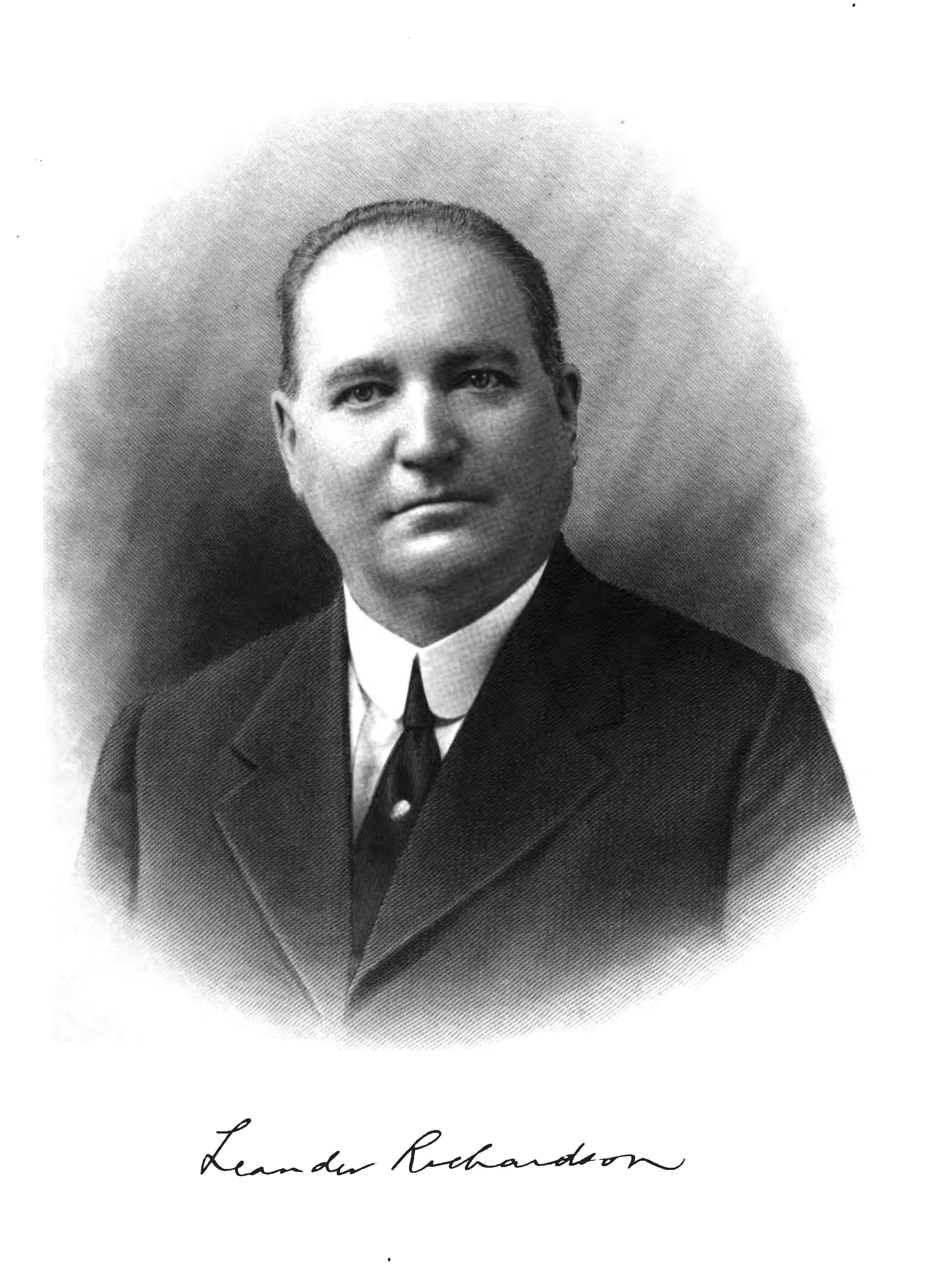
Leander P. Richardson

Sage McFarland and Richardson got advice from his friend Vice President Schuyler Colfax on using Indiana divorce laws for the fastest results. McFarland shot and wounded Richardson in March 1867, but the latter recovered. But on November 25, 1869, McFarland shot Richardson in the offices of the New York Tribune in front of the night clerk Daniel Frohman (later a famous Broadway producer). Richarson was fatally shot, but lived for over a week. By this time Abby Sage had gotten her divorce, and Richardson married her at a special bedside marriage performed by the Rev. Henry Ward Beecher.

The trial was a farce, with Tammany connections and dislike for the people who worked at the Tribune being used fairly shamelessly to protect McFarland. He was shown by his defenders to be a defender of the home and hearth against a seducer, as Harry K. Thaw would be shown to be in his 1907 trial for the murder of Stanford White. McFarland was acquitted among cheering crowds. But his ex-wife did not return to him and spent the rest of her life as Abby Richardson, working in the theater as play reader. She died in 1900. McFarland went west. In the words of the criminal historian Edmund Pearson, it did not take him long to drink himself to death.

The story continues to resonate because Abby was the victim of domestic violence. Yet even sixty years later the historian Claude G. Bowers in his partisan history The Tragic Era (1929) showed a mean comfort in the fate of Richardson, and the tarnishing of Beecher, Colfax, and Greeley by the scandal (as though they were responsible, not McFarland).

Journalist Leander Richardson was the son of Albert and Mary Louise.

== Books ==
- Richardson, Albert D. (1865). The Secret Service, the Field, the Dungeon, and the Escape. American Publishing Company; Hartford, CT.
- —— (1867). 'Beyond the Mississippi, From the Great River to the Great Ocean. American Publishing Company; Hartford, CT.
  (reprint edition, June 1, 1967, by Johnson Reprint Corp, ISBN 0-384-50670-4)
- A Personal History of Ulysses S Grant. American Publishing Company; Hartford, CT; 1868.
- Garnered Sheaves. Columbian Book Company; Hartford, CT; 1871 (a collection of his writings published posthumously by his wife).
- Carlson, Peter (2013). Junius and Albert's Adventures in the Confederacy. PublicAffairs. ISBN 9781610391542. (A new book about Junius Henri Browne and Richardson)

== See also ==
- Bibliography of Ulysses S. Grant
