= Virginia Buchanan =

- Born: August 26, 1866; Cincinnati
- Died: December 22, 1931 (aged 65); Amityville
- Occupation: Actor
- Parent(s): McKean Buchanan

Virginia Ellen Buchanan (August 26, 1866 – December 22, 1931) was an American stage actor.

Virginia Buchanan was born on August 26, 1866 in Cincinnati, Ohio, the daughter of noted Shakespearean actor McKean Buchanan. She made her stage debut as an apparition in Macbeth in Cardiff and went on to play supporting roles with her father such as Desdemona and Ophelia. Her most prominent role may have been as Margaret Dalyrmple in Our Boarding House (1877). She created the role and starred in it for five years. She spent several years with the Madison Square Theatre Company and performed with the company of Tommaso Salvini.

Her final stage appearance was alongside Ethel Barrymore in Sunday.

Virginia Buchanan died on 22 December 1931 in Amityville, New York.

== Personal life ==
In 1872, she married Benton Parker. He died in 1873.
