= Agnes Castle =

Irish writer

- Born: Agnes Mary Frances Sweetman c. 1860/c. 1861; County Dublin
- Died: 1922
- Occupation: Writer
- Spouse: Egerton Castle

Agnes Mary Frances Castle (née Sweetman; c. 1860/1861 – 1922) was a Victorian era Irish author who worked with both her own sisters and her husband. The stories that she co-wrote were the basis of several plays and films.

== Life ==
Agnes Mary Frances Sweetman was born in County Dublin to Michael James Sweetman (1829-1864), of Lamberton Park, Queen's County, JP, High Sheriff of Queen's County in 1852, and (Mary) Margaret, only child and heir of Michael Powell, of Fitzwilliam Square, Dublin. She had two brothers and was the youngest of four sisters. The Sweetman family were landed gentry of Longtown, County Kildare, and per family tradition were "long settled in Dublin" and "previously resident near Callan and Newtown, County Kilkenny", tracing their line back to the mid-1500s. After her father's death, when she was a small child, the remaining family moved to Brussels in 1873 and she spent her summers in Switzerland. Her sisters, Elinor and Mary Elizabeth, were also writers. With her sisters she began two family magazines: the "Ivy Home Magazine" and "Ivy Home Library".

Agnes married Egerton Castle in 1883 and co-authored many novels with her husband. She also wrote plays for children, as well as stories for magazines such as Temple Bar, Cornhill Magazine, and Macmillan. She has largely been ignored as a writer compared to her husband. Her daughter, Marie Louise Egerton Castle (1885-1969), made a "considerable reputation" as author of a "History of Italian Literature" and reviser of Cary's translation of Dante's Divine Comedy; on 25 October 1922, at the Brompton Oratory, she married Count Antoine de Meeûs, of Brussels.

== Selected works ==
- Love Gilds the Scene, and Women Guide the Plot. B. Tauchnitz. 1912.
- Minuet and Foxtrot. Hutchinson. 1900.
- The Third Year in the Little House. Hutchinson. 1917.
- My Merry Rockhurst: Some Episodes in the Life of Viscount Rockhurst, a Friend of the King at One Time Constable of His Majesty's Tower. Tauchnitz. 1908.
- My Little Lady Anne. John Lane, The Bodley Head. 1896.
- Nan. B. Wahlström. 1918.
- The Pride of Jennico: Being a Memoir of Captain Basil Jennico. Macmillan. 1907.
- The Bath Comedy (Macmillan 1901); adapted by David Belasco into the Broadway play Sweet Kitty Bellairs (1903)
- If Youth But Knew (Smith Elder 1906)
- Flower o' the Orange and Other Stories (Methuen 1908)
- The Star Dreamer (Constable 1903)
- The Composer (1911)
- Incomparable Bellairs (1903)
- Rose of the World (1905)
- The Heart of Lady Anne (1905)
- Flower o' the Orange and Other Tales of Bygone Days (1908)
- Panther's Cub (1911)
- The Golden Barrier (1913)
- Forlorn Adventures (1915)
- Minniglen (1918)
- Our Sentimental Garden illustrated by Charles Robinson (1914, USA; 1915, London)
- A Little House in War Time (1916)
- Wolf-Lure (1917)
- New Wine (1919)
- John Seneschal's Margaret (1920)
- Pamela Pounce; a tale of tempestuous petticoats (1921)
- Diamonds Cut Paste (1922)
- The Wind's Will (1916)
- "The Heart of Lord Mandeville", Vol 19, 1903-04 [included in Incomparable Bellairs, 1903]
- "To the Tune of Little Red Heels", Windsor Magazine, Vol 19, 1903-04 [included in Incomparable Bellairs, 1903]
- Vengeance Is Mine; Enchanted Casements, Hutchinson 1923

== Filmography ==
Agnes co-wrote the books these films were based on.

- The Pride of Jennico, directed by J. Searle Dawley (1914, based on The Pride of Jennico)
- The Incomparable Bellairs, directed by Harold M. Shaw (UK, 1914, based on The Incomparable Bellairs)
- The Secret Orchard, directed by Frank Reicher (1915, based on The Secret Orchard)
- Sweet Kitty Bellairs, directed by James Young (1916, based on The Bath Comedy)
- Rose of the World, directed by Maurice Tourneur (1918, based on Rose of the World)
- Sweet Kitty Bellairs, directed by Alfred E. Green (1930, based on The Bath Comedy)
