= Bertha Galland =

American actress

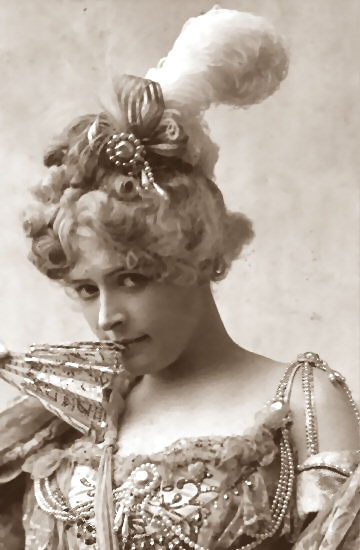
- Born: November 15, 1876; Wilkes-Barre, Pennsylvania, U.S.
- Died: November 20, 1932 (aged 56); White Plains, New York, U.S.
- Occupation: Stage Actress
- Relatives: Louis Arthur Watres (uncle)

Bertha Galland (November 15, 1876 – November 20, 1932) was an American dramatic stage actress remembered for her romantic roles.

== Early life ==
Bertha Galland was the daughter of Berthold Galland and Anna Miller Hawley. According to her obituary in The New York Times, she was born near Wilkes-Barre, Pennsylvania, though early travel documents and census records give Bergen, New Jersey or New York City as her birthplace. Berthold Galland was a native of Posen, Prussia (present-day Poznań, Poland) who came to America in 1860 where he became a dry goods merchant and later found success as a manufacturer of fashionable women’s lace undergarments. Anna Galland (a.k.a. A. M. Galland), born in Harford, Pennsylvania, was a talented marine and landscape artist. Anna’s sister, Effie Julia Hawley, was the wife of Louis Arthur Watres, a onetime Lieutenant Governor of Pennsylvania.

Galland took to the stage about age twenty after studying drama for several years in Europe and later in America as a student of George Edgar, a former instructor of actress Margaret Mather. In the summer of 1895 it was widely reported in the press that the following season Galland would debut playing Juliet, Lady Macbeth and Frou-Frou in a tour of New England. Two months later though, the tour was cancelled after her father and uncle withdrew their financial support for the venture. Later in 1896 she formed a stock company with George Edgar performing “Comedy and Tragedy” in engagements such as their December, 1896 presentations at the opera house in Adams and the Columbia Opera House in North Adams, Massachusetts, playing five select scenes taken from plays by Shakespeare, Sheridan and Daly. An Adams theater critic later wrote, “Lovers of good acting who failed to attend the performance of Miss Bertha Galland and George Edgar at the opera house at Adams last evening, missed one of the best attractions of the season.”

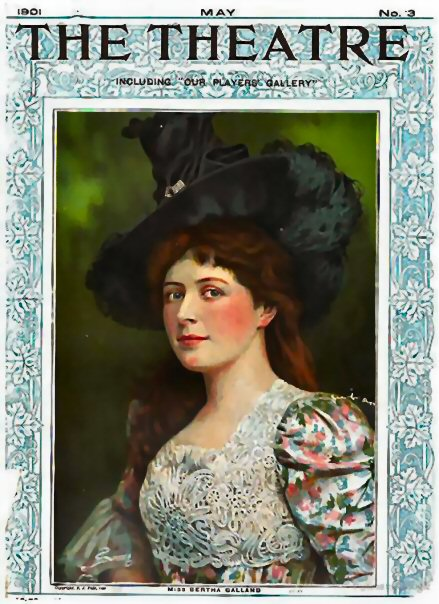
On the cover of The Theatre, May 1901

== Career ==
Galland's first major success came in 1900 at the Criterion Theatre in New York playing Marie Ottilie in The Pride of Jennico opposite James K. Hackett. The following year she played the lead role Isoult the Desirous in The Forest Lovers at the Lyceum Theatre. She next appeared in The Love Match at the Lyceum as Pansy de Castro and then in a long engagement as Esméralda, in a road production of The Hunchback of Notre-Dame.

Her greatest success came in 1903 at the New York Theatre as Dorothy in the Elizabethan drama Dorothy Vernon of Haddon Hall. After the play ended its New York run it went on the road for several seasons before returning to New York for a brief revival production at the Lyric Theatre near the end of 1904. She found similar success with David Belasco playing the title role in Sweet Kitty Bellairs in New York and elsewhere. After a brief absence from the stage she returned in 1909 to star in the modern fantasy The Return of Eve, staged at the Herald Square Theatre early in 1909.

== Later life ==
Though only in her mid-thirties and still in demand, Galland chose to retire after touring with The Return of Eve in 1910. During the remainder of her life she stayed active among theater circles, wrote and traveled with her mother. At some point in her later years Galland wrote The Coral Girl, a libretto for light opera. John James Donnelly, her former manager, had planned to produce the piece but, like Galland, did not live to see the project through completion. On May 8, 1910, Bertha Galland was one of fourteen prominent actresses to greet President William Howard Taft before his inaugural address opening the Actors Fund Fair in New York. The fair was organized to raise $200,000 to benefit the Actors Fund of America and drew some 10,000 visitors on its first day. On May 2, 1929, Galland presented President Herbert Hoover with an illuminated copy of a song she composed as a possible American national anthem called America Beloved Land. The song had earlier been performed by the U.S. Marine Band at Hoover's inauguration celebration.

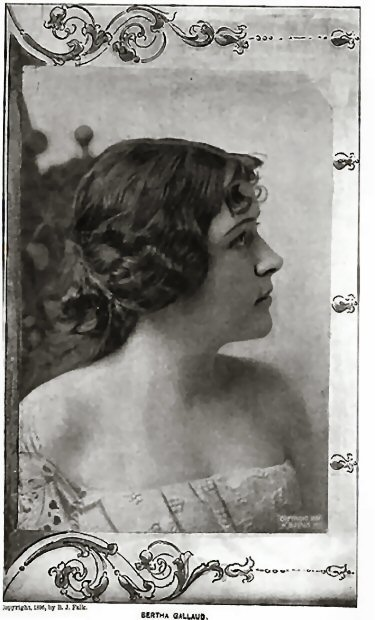
Metropolitan Magazine, 1897

The following year, at the Twelfth Night Club’s annual celebration held at the American Women’s Association ballroom on West Fifty- Seventh Street in New York, Galland recited a poem she composed for the club’s guest of honor, producer Daniel Frohman. Six months later Frohman, who was then president of the Actors Fund, read a poem by Galland at a luncheon following his annual inspection of the fund’s retirement home in Englewood, New Jersey.

Galland possibly had some connection with her father’s business for in 1907 she was issued a patent by the U.S. Patent and Trademark Office for a design for a lace fastener/yoke for a nightgown or kimono which could be removed prior to washing the garment, thus protecting the lace fastener from damage. This design allowed a more expensive lace upper section to be attached to a common nightgown.

== Death ==
Bertha Galland died in an automobile accident in White Plains, New York on November 20, 1932. At the time she was a passenger in a car with her mother and a family friend. Their driver was unable to stop in time when a car pulled out from a side street. The force of the accident was such that Galland’s car overturned striking a fire hydrant and severely injuring several people at a bus stop. Galland died on the way to hospital and her mother shortly after arriving. While both drivers later claimed they were driving safely, eyewitness accounts indicated that the other driver ran a stop sign and that Galland’s car was traveling at an excessive speed. She was survived by her brother Seymour and uncle, Louis Watres. Seymour’s daughter, Dorothy Galland, was a 1920s vaudeville singer, comedian and quick-change artist. Berthold Galland, a co-founder of the Galland-Stewart Co., died on March 2, 1911, while in his mid-sixties.
