= Egerton Castle =

British fencer and author

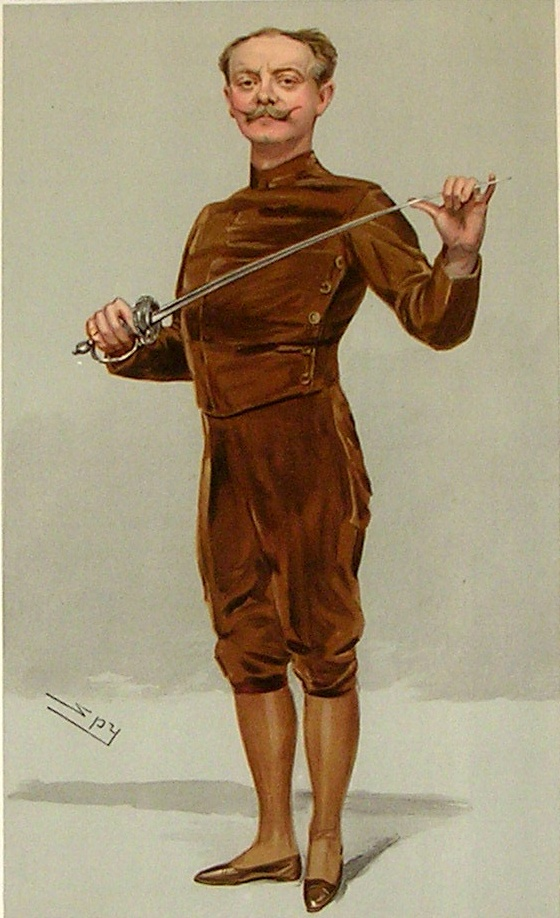
"He insists that his pen is mightier than his sword" Castle as caricatured by Spy (Leslie Ward) in the magazine Vanity Fair, March 1905.

Egerton Smith Castle F.S.A. (12 March 1858 – 16 September 1920) was an author, antiquarian, and swordsman, and an early practitioner of reconstructed historical fencing, frequently in collaboration with his colleague Captain Alfred Hutton. Castle was the captain of the British épée and sabre teams at the 1908 Summer Olympics.

He was born in London into a wealthy family; his maternal grandfather was the publishing magnate and philanthropist Egerton Smith. He was a lieutenant of the Second West India Regiment and afterwards a captain of the Royal Engineers Militia. He was also an expert on bookplates and a keen collector.

Egerton Castle co-authored several novels with his wife, Agnes Sweetman Castle.

== Selected works ==
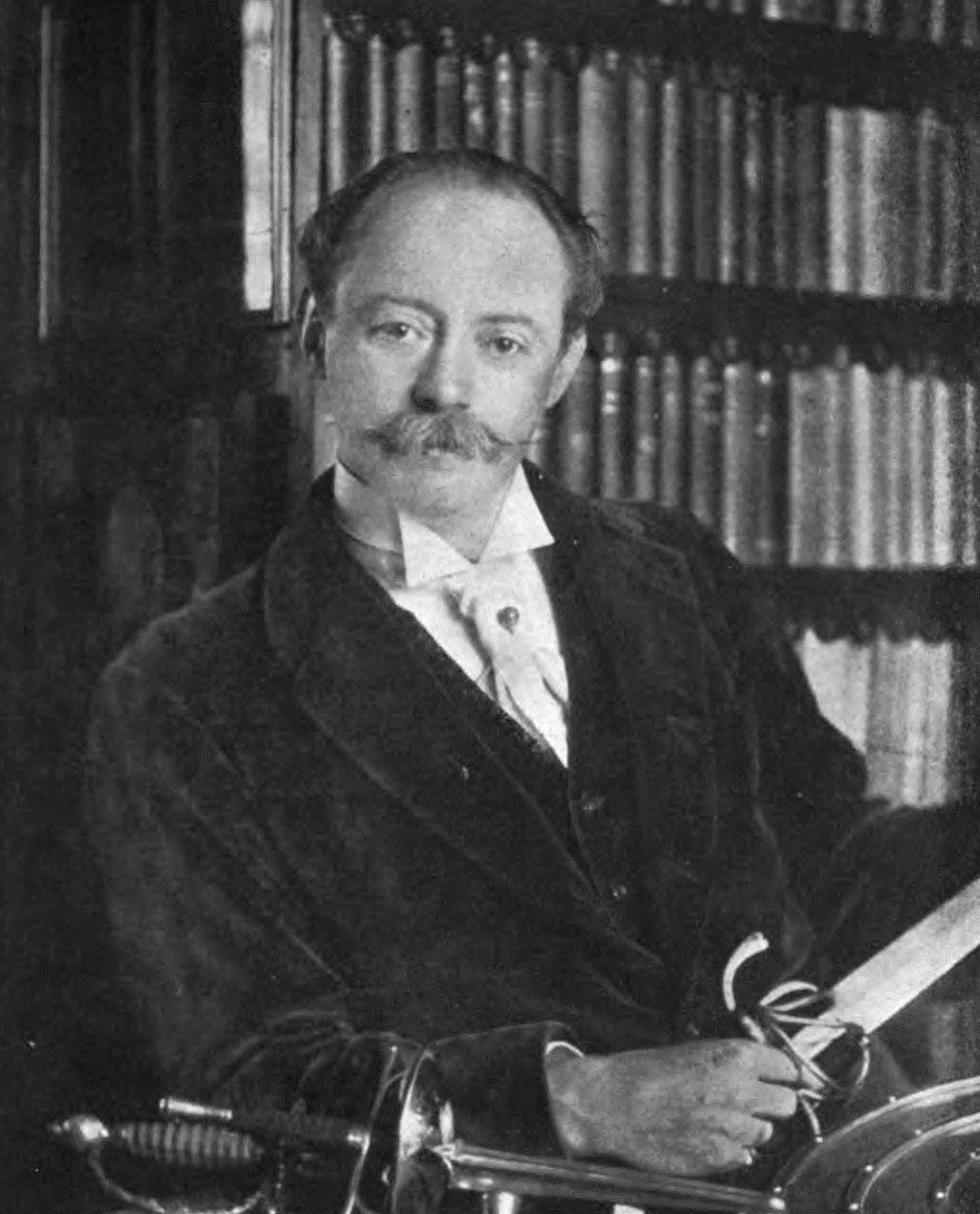
c. 1908.

- Schools and Masters of Fencing : From the Middle Ages to the Eighteenth Century, ISBN 0-486-42826-5 (2005), ISBN 1-4286-0940-7 (2006). (The first edition: G. Bell & Sons, London 1885)
- Castle, Egerton. "The Baron's Quarry". onlinebooks.library.upenn.edu.
- Consequences. London: Richard Bentley and Son. 1891. 3 volume novel.
- English Book-plates. An illustrated handbook for students of ex-libris. (G. Bell & sons, London 1893).
- The Pride of Jennico (1897, novel, composed with Agnes Castle).
- The Pride of Jennico, play based on the novel of same name.
- The Bath Comedy (1900, novel, with Agnes Castle); adapted by David Belasco into the 1903 Broadway play Sweet Kitty Bellairs; in turn made into a 1916 silent movie and a 1930 musical movie in Technicolor. See below, Sweet Kitty Bellairs.
- La Bella And Others (short stories published by Macmillan, London 1900).
- Marshfield the Observer; and The Death Dance. (fantasy fiction published by Macmillan 1900).
- Rose of the World (1905, novel, with Agnes Castle).
- Our Sentimental Garden. (with Agnes Castle and illustrated by Charles Robinson) 1914 USA /1915 London.
- Count Raven (Cassell, London 1916) novel.
- Minniglen. (romance, 1918, with Agnes Castle).

== Filmography ==
- The Pride of Jennico, directed by J. Searle Dawley (1914, based on The Pride of Jennico).
- The Incomparable Bellairs, directed by Harold M. Shaw (UK, 1914, based on The Incomparable Bellairs).
- The Secret Orchard, directed by Frank Reicher (1915, based on The Secret Orchard).
- Sweet Kitty Bellairs, directed by James Young (1916, based on The Bath Comedy).
- Rose of the World, directed by Maurice Tourneur (1918, based on Rose of the World).
- Young April, directed by Donald Crisp (1926, based on Young April).
- Sweet Kitty Bellairs, directed by Alfred E. Green (1930, based on The Bath Comedy).

== See also ==
- Alfred Hutton
- Agnes Castle

== Sources ==
- The Edgar Rice Burroughs Library
