= Bookman list of bestselling novels in the United States in the 1890s =

This is a list of bestselling novels in the United States from 1895 through 1899, as determined by The Bookman, a New York–based literary journal. Without the international copyright law which came into force in 1891, these volumes could have been printed and published by anyone, the change in this state of affairs made it possible to compile accurate sales figures.

Notable attempts to compile a list of best-selling books in the United States prior to 1895 include The Popular Book: A History of America's Literary Taste (1950) by James D. Hart.

== 1895 ==
Title page illustration for The Princess Aline (1895)

1. Beside the Bonnie Brier Bush by Ian Maclaren
2. Trilby by George du Maurier
3. The Adventures of Captain Horn by Frank R. Stockton
4. The Manxman by Hall Caine
5. The Princess Aline by Richard Harding Davis
6. The Days of Auld Lang Syne by Ian Maclaren
7. The Master by Israel Zangwill
8. The Prisoner of Zenda by Anthony Hope
9. Degeneration by Max Nordau
10. My Lady Nobody by Maarten Maartens

== 1896 ==
1. Tom Grogan by Francis Hopkinson Smith
2. A Lady of Quality by Frances Hodgson Burnett
3. The Seats of the Mighty by Gilbert Parker
4. A Singular Life by Elizabeth Stuart Phelps Ward
5. The Damnation of Theron Ware by Harold Frederic
6. A House-Boat on the Styx by John Kendrick Bangs
7. Kate Carnegie by Ian Maclaren
8. The Red Badge of Courage by Stephen Crane
9. Sentimental Tommy by J. M. Barrie
10. Beside the Bonnie Brier Bush by Ian Maclaren

== 1897 ==
1. Quo Vadis by Henryk Sienkiewicz
2. The Choir Invisible by James Lane Allen
3. Soldiers of Fortune by Richard Harding Davis
4. On the Face of the Waters by Flora Annie Steel
5. Phroso by Anthony Hope
6. The Christian by Hall Caine
7. Margaret Ogilvy by J. M. Barrie
8. Sentimental Tommy by J. M. Barrie
9. Pursuit of the House-Boat by John Kendrick Bangs
10. The Honorable Peter Stirling by Paul Leicester Ford

== 1898 ==
1. Caleb West by Francis Hopkinson Smith
2. Hugh Wynne by Silas Weir Mitchell
3. Penelope's Progress by Kate Douglas Wiggin
4. Helbeck of Bannisdale by Mary Augusta Ward
5. Quo Vadis by Henryk Sienkiewicz
6. The Pride of Jennico by Agnes and Egerton Castle
7. The Day's Work by Rudyard Kipling
8. Shrewsbury by Stanley J. Weyman
9. Simon Dale by Anthony Hope
10. (tie) The Adventures of François by Silas Weir Mitchell and The Battle of the Strong by Gilbert Parker

== 1899 ==
1. David Harum by Edward Noyes Westcott
2. When Knighthood Was in Flower by Charles Major
3. Richard Carvel by Winston Churchill
4. The Day's Work by Rudyard Kipling
5. Red Rock by Thomas Nelson Page
6. Aylwin by Theodore Watts-Dunton
7. Janice Meredith by Paul Leicester Ford
8. Mr. Dooley in Peace and War by Finley Peter Dunne
9. No. 5 John Street by Richard Whiteing
10. The Market Place by Harold Frederic
