= Felix O'Day =

Felix O'Day may refer to:

- Felix O'Day (novel), a 1915 novel by Francis Hopkinson Smith
- Felix O'Day (film), a lost 1920 silent film based on the novel
