= Fishers Island Ferry District =

Special district in Suffolk County, New York, United States

- The district's MV Race Point at the New London, Connecticut terminal in 2014

Ferry district overview
- Formed: 1947
- Headquarters: 261 Trumbull Drive Fishers Island, New York 06390
- Website: www.fiferry.com

The Fishers Island Ferry District is a special district serving Fishers Island in Suffolk County, New York, United States.

== Description ==
The primary purpose of the Fishers Island Ferry District is to operate the Fishers Island Ferry – a passenger & vehicular ferry system linking Fishers Island with New London, Connecticut to its north, across the Fishers Island (Long Island) Sound. The district also operates and maintains numerous properties and facilities owned by – and on behalf of – the Town of Southold on Fishers Island, including Elizabeth Field.

The district is primarily funded through special district taxes on properties within the district and through the issuance of bonds.

== History ==
The Fishers Island Ferry District was established in 1947, through an act of the New York State Legislature under Section 4 of chapter 699 of the laws of 1947; the act was known as the Ferry District Enabling Act. Its creation came in response the Fishers Island Navigation Company – which had privately operated the ferry between Fishers Island and the mainland for roughly 58 years – ceasing operations on October 15 of that year; the establishment of the new ferry district would ensure the continuation of ferry operations between the island and mainland through a dedicated government agency.

In 2025, the district sued the Southold Town Police Department, asserting that it illegally seized district property.

In the mid-2020s, it was announced that the Fishers Island Ferry District was seeking to raise funds to replace one of its boat ramps completed in the 1980s and for the erection and ordering of a new, larger ferryboat to replace a one in its existing fleet christened in the 1970s.

== Governance ==
The Fishers Island Ferry District is governed by a five-member elected board of commissioners, known as the Fishers Island Ferry District board of commissioners.

As of September 2026, the district commissioners are Heather F. Burnham, Thomas "Tom" Cashel, David Congdon, James "Jim" Reid, and Dianna Shillo.

== Fishers Island Ferry ==
Fishers Island Ferry

- The Fishers Island Ferry District's New London ferry terminal in 2022
- Waterway: Fishers Island Sound
- Transit type: Passenger and automobile ferry
- Owner: Fishers Island Ferry District
- Operator: Fishers Island Ferry District
- No. of vessels: 2
- No. of terminals: 2
- Website: www.fiferry.com

The Fishers Island Ferry is a passenger and vehicular ferry line linking Fishers Island, New York with New London, Connecticut, via the Fishers Island (Long Island) Sound. It is operated year-round by the Fishers Island Ferry District – a special district of New York state.

=== Description ===
The ferry carries passengers, vehicles, and freight across the Long Island Sound. Children from mainland Connecticut and Rhode Island who attend the Fishers Island Union Free School District's school for their K-12 education commute to and from the mainland and the island each day.

=== Fleet ===
==== Active fleet ====
As of October 2026, the Fishers Island Ferry operates the following vessels:

Fishers Island Ferry current fleet
| Image | Vessel | Year built | Vehicle capacity | Passenger capacity | Length | Type | Note | Reference(s) |
|---|---|---|---|---|---|---|---|---|
| | MV Munnatawket | 1977 | 24 | 209 | 132 feet (40 m) | ROPAX | Commissioned by Fishers Island Ferry District; designed and built in Warren, Rhode Island, by Blount Marine. | |
| | MV Race Point | 1985 | 34 | 246 | 162 feet (49 m) | ROPAX | Commissioned by Fishers Island Ferry District; designed and built in Panama City, Florida, by Eastern Marine Inc. | |

== See also ==
- Special districts in New York (state)
- Bridgeport and Port Jefferson Ferry
- Cross Sound Ferry
- Fire Island Ferries
- North Ferry
- South Ferry (Shelter Island)
