= Caleb West =

Caleb West may refer to:

- Caleb Walton West (1844–1909), Governor of Utah Territory
- Caleb West (novel), an 1898 novel by Francis Hopkinson Smith
