= The Tides of Barnegat =

- Directed by: Marshall Neilan
- Screenplay by: Francis Hopkinson Smith (novel); Eve Unsell
- Produced by: Jesse L. Lasky
- Starring: Blanche Sweet; Elliott Dexter; Tom Forman; Norma Nichols; Billy Jacobs; Walter Rodgers
- Cinematography: Walter Stradling
- Production company: Jesse L. Lasky Feature Play Company
- Distributed by: Paramount Pictures
- Release date: April 12, 1917
- Running time: 50 minutes
- Country: United States
- Language: English

The Tides of Barnegat is a lost 1917 American drama silent film directed by Marshall Neilan and written by Francis Hopkinson Smith and Eve Unsell. The film stars Blanche Sweet, Elliott Dexter, Tom Forman, Norma Nichols, Billy Jacobs and Walter Rodgers. The film was released on April 12, 1917, by Paramount Pictures.

== Cast ==
- Blanche Sweet as Jane Cobden
- Elliott Dexter as Dr. John Cavendish
- Tom Forman as Barton Holt
- Norma Nichols as Lucy Cobden
- Billy Jacobs as Archie
- Walter Rodgers as Captain Nathan Holt
- Harrison Ford as Sidney Gray
- Lillian Leighton as Martha Lillian

== Preservation ==
With no holdings located in archives, The Tides of Barnegat is considered a lost film.
