= Caleb West (novel) =

Novel by Francis Hopkinson Smith

Caleb West, Master Diver
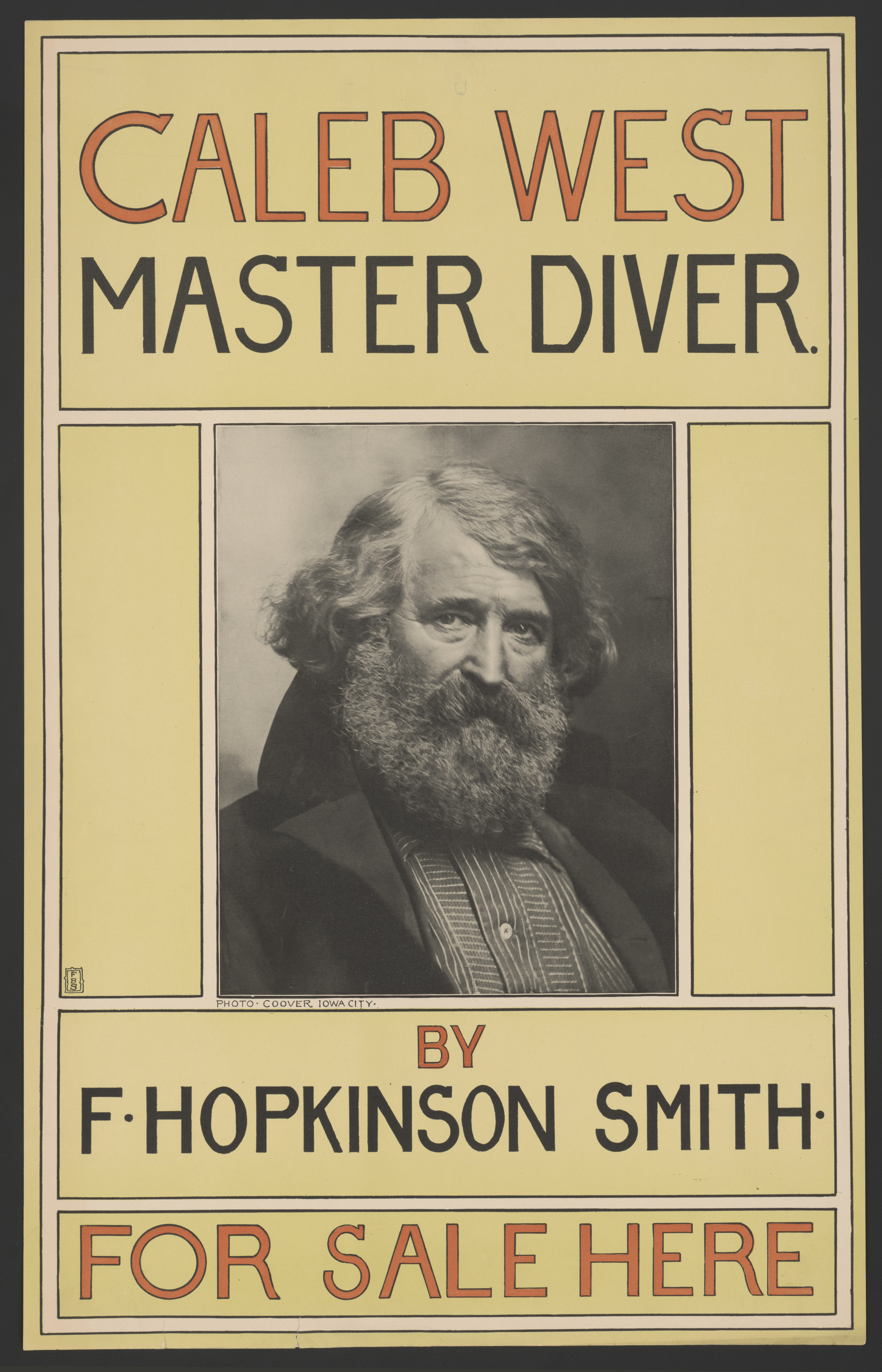
- Literary poster c. 1898
- Author: Francis Hopkinson Smith
- Illustrator: Malcolm Fraser and Arthur I. Keller
- Language: English
- Genre: Novel
- Publication date: April 1898
- Publication place: United States
- Media type: Print (Hardcover)
- Pages: 378 pp

Caleb West, Master Diver is a novel published in 1898 by Francis Hopkinson Smith that was the best selling book in the United States in 1898. It was first serialized in The Atlantic Monthly from October 1897 to March 1898, and was published in book form by Houghton Mifflin in April 1898 with illustrations by Malcolm Fraser and Arthur I. Keller.

The book is based on Smith's experience in the building of the Race Rock Light near Fishers Island, New York in the 1870s.

== Adaptations ==
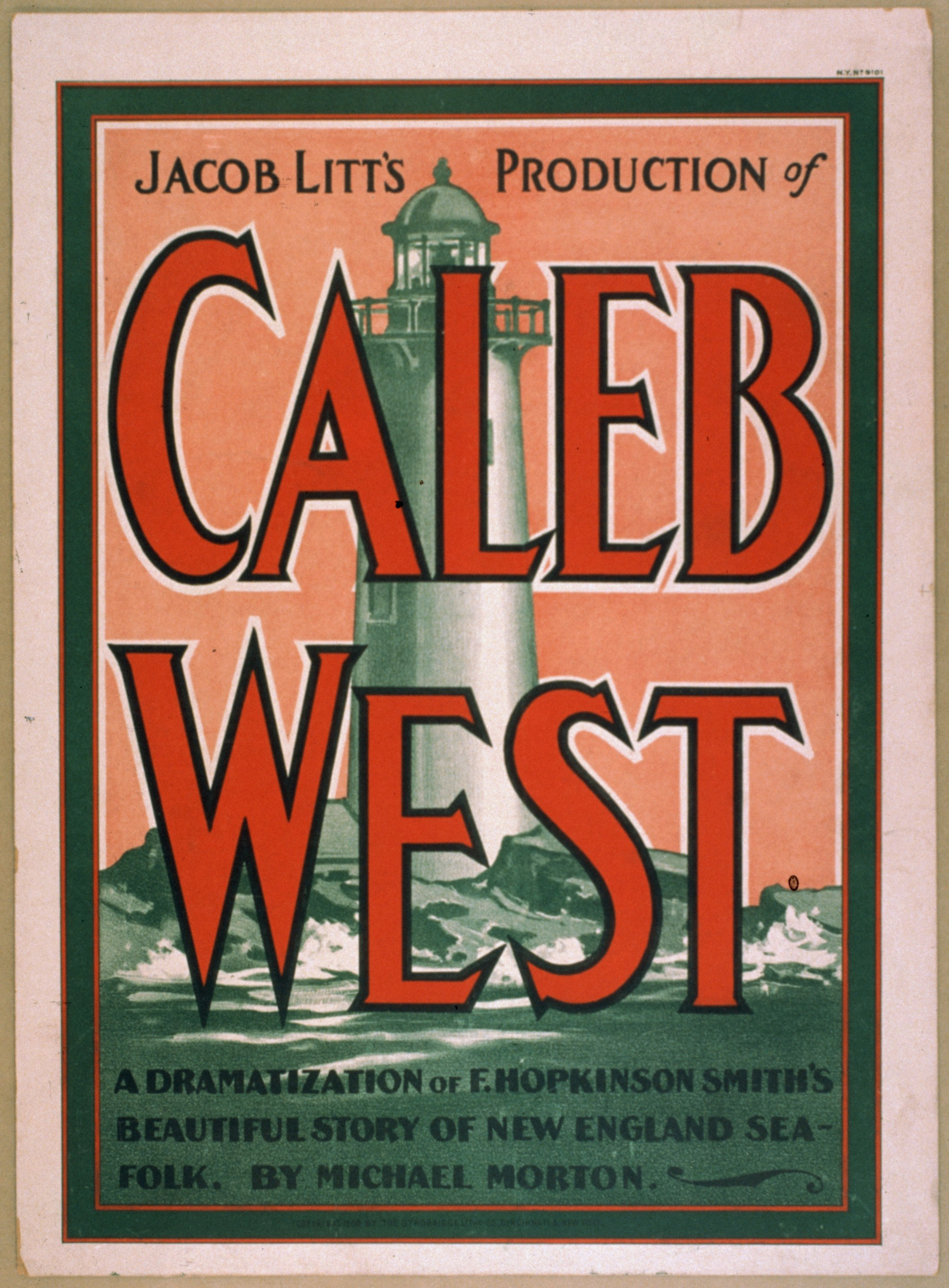
Poster for the play Caleb West (1900), adapted by Michael Morton

The novel was adapted into a play by Michael Morton.

It was also adapted into a silent film in 1912, and a 1920 silent film called Deep Waters.
