= Elizabeth Field (Suffolk County, New York) =

- IATA: FID; ICAO: none; FAA LID: 0B8

Summary
- Airport type: Public
- Owner: Town of Southold
- Operator: Fishers Island Ferry District
- Serves: Fishers Island, New York
- Elevation AMSL: 9 ft (2.7 m)
- Coordinates: 41°15′05″N 072°01′54″W
- Website: www.fiferry.com/airport/

Map
- Interactive map of Elizabeth Field

Runways
Direction	Length		Surface
Direction	ft	m	Surface
12/30	2,328	710	Asphalt
7/25	1,792	546	Asphalt

Statistics (2007)
- Aircraft operations: 2,125
- Based aircraft: 6
- Source: Federal Aviation Administration

Elizabeth Field (IATA: FID, FAA LID: 0B8) is a public use airport located on Fishers Island, in Suffolk County, New York, United States. It is owned by the Town of Southold. According to the FAA's National Plan of Integrated Airport Systems for 2009–2013, Elizabeth Field is classified as a general aviation airport.

Located on the western end of Fishers Island, the airfield saw military use during World War II as part of Fort H. G. Wright.

== Facilities and aircraft ==
Elizabeth Field covers an area of 122 acres (49 ha) at an elevation of 9 feet (3 m) above mean sea level. It has two asphalt paved runways: 12/30 is 2,328 by 100 feet (710 x 30 m) and 7/25 is 1,792 by 75 feet (546 x 23 m).

For the 12-month period ending September 27, 2007, the airport had 2,125 aircraft operations, an average of 177 per month: 52% air taxi, 47% general aviation and 1% military. At that time there were 6 aircraft based at this airport: 67% single-engine and 33% multi-engine.

== See also ==
- List of airports in New York
- Block Island State Airport
