= Deep Waters (1920 film) =

1920 film by Maurice Tourneur

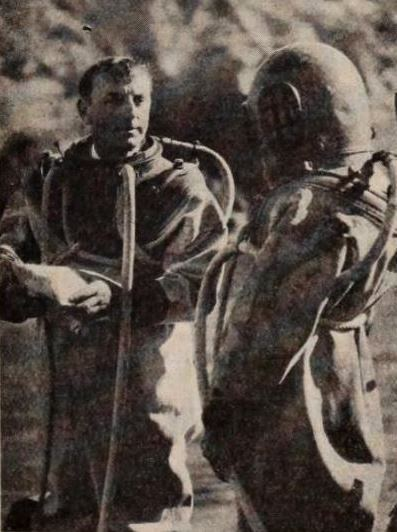
- Director Maurice Tourneur preparing to scout out a possible underwater filming location
- Directed by: Maurice Tourneur
- Screenplay by: F. Hopkinson Smith (novel Caleb West); Michael Morton; John Gilbert
- Produced by: Maurice Tourneur
- Starring: Rudolph Christians; Barbara Bedford; John Gilbert; Florence Deshon; Jack McDonald; Henry Woodward; George Nichols
- Cinematography: Alfred Ortlieb; Homer Scott
- Production company: Maurice Tourneur Productions
- Distributed by: Paramount Pictures
- Release date: October 10, 1920
- Running time: 50 minutes
- Country: United States
- Language: Silent (English intertitles)

Deep Waters is a lost 1920 American silent drama film directed by Maurice Tourneur and written by F. Hopkinson Smith, Michael Morton and John Gilbert. The film stars Rudolph Christians, Barbara Bedford, John Gilbert, Florence Deshon, Jack McDonald, Henry Woodward, and George Nichols. The film was released on October 10, 1920, by Paramount Pictures.

== Cast ==
- Rudolph Christians as Caleb West
- Barbara Bedford as Betty West
- John Gilbert as Bill Lacey
- Florence Deshon as Kate Leroy
- Jack McDonald as Morgan Leroy
- Henry Woodward as Henry Sanford
- George Nichols as Captain Joe Bell
- Lydia Yeamans Titus as Aunty Bell
- Marie Van Tassell as Barzella Busteed
- James Gibson as Squealer
- Ruth Wing as Zuby Higgins
- B. Edgar Stockwell as Seth Wingate
- Charles Millsfield as Professor Page
- Siggrid McDonald as Page's Niece
