= New London Customhouse =

- New London Custom House
- U.S. National Register of Historic Places
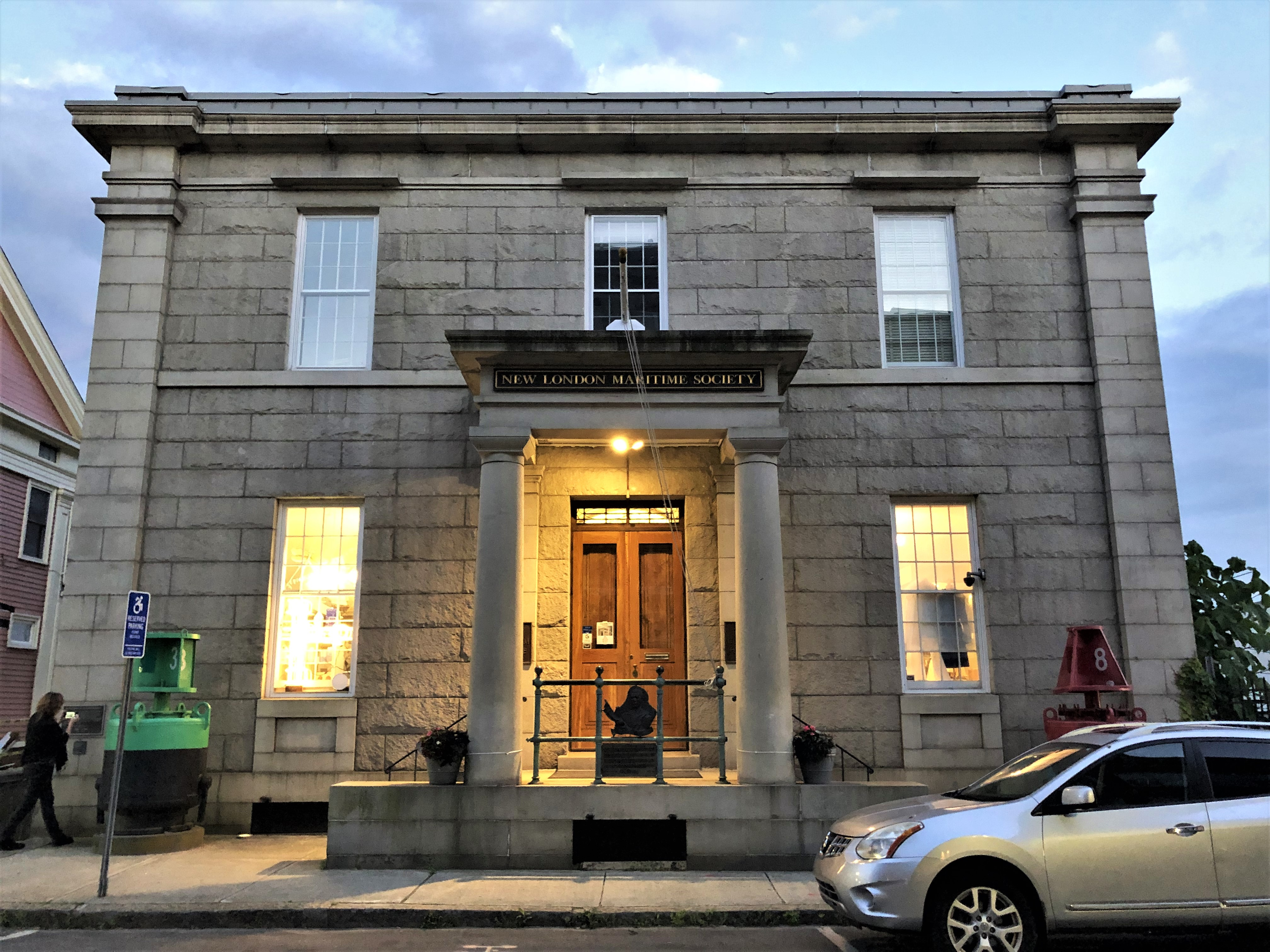
- New London Custom House

- Location within Connecticut Location within the United States
- Location: 150 Bank Street, New London, Connecticut
- Coordinates: 41°21′8″N 72°5′46″W
- Area: 2 acres (0.81 ha)
- Built: 1833
- Architect: Robert Mills
- NRHP reference No.: 70000706
- Added to NRHP: October 15, 1970

The New London Custom House is a historic custom house at 150 Bank Street in New London, Connecticut, built in 1833-35. It was designed by Robert Mills, one of the country's first formally trained architects. From 1839-40, the schooner La Amistad, on which captured Africans meant for the slave trade rebelled, was impounded at a wharf behind the customhouse. It was listed on the National Register of Historic Places for its architecture in 1970, and is now a local museum covering the city's maritime history.

== Description and history ==
The New London Custom House is located on New London's waterfront, facing north onto Bank Street east of its junction with Pearl Street. It is a three-story masonry structure, built out of dressed granite of differing colors. Due to sloping terrain, it presents two stories to Bank Street and three to Water Street, which separates it from the waterfront. It has corner pilasters shaped out of light granite, and its main entrance is sheltered by a porch with round columns and pilasters made of more smoothly finished light granite. A stringcourse of light granite separates the upper floors, and the top-floor windows have projecting cornices over the lintels. The door is fashioned out of wood that was once used in the USS Constitution. The custom house was built in 1833 to a design by Robert Mills, who was then employed by the federal government. The granite for its construction was taken from the Millstone Quarry in Waterford, Connecticut.

The building was still in use as a customs office at the time of its National Register listing in 1970. It now serves as the headquarters of the New London Maritime Society, which operates it as the Custom House Maritime Museum. Exhibits include New London's maritime history, ship models, the Amistad affair, the history of the Robert Mills building, and regional lighthouses. The Frank L. McGuire Maritime Library consists of more than 2,300 books, charts, maps, and prints. The Society also owns the nearby New London Harbor Light, the offshore Race Rock Light, and New London Ledge Light, and it operates tours of all three.

== See also ==
- National Register of Historic Places listings in New London County, Connecticut
- List of maritime museums in the United States
