= Francis Hopkinson Smith =

American writer, artist, and engineer (1838–1915)

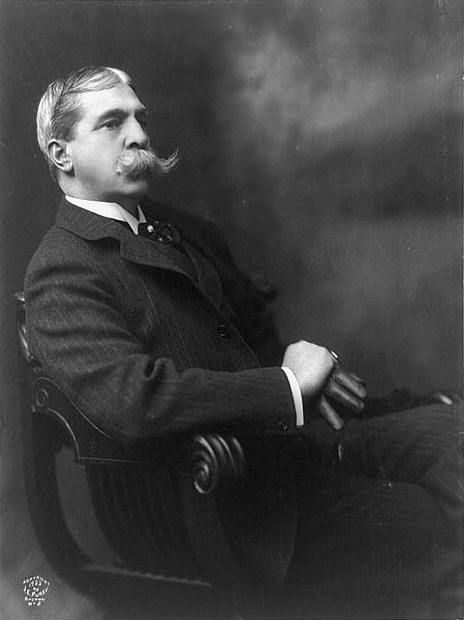
- Smith, c. 1903
- Born: October 23, 1838; Baltimore, Maryland, U.S.
- Died: April 7, 1915 (aged 76); New York City, New York, U.S.
- Occupations: Writer, artist, engineer
- Known for: Constructing the foundation of the Statue of Liberty
- Spouse: Josephine Van Deventer (m. 1866)

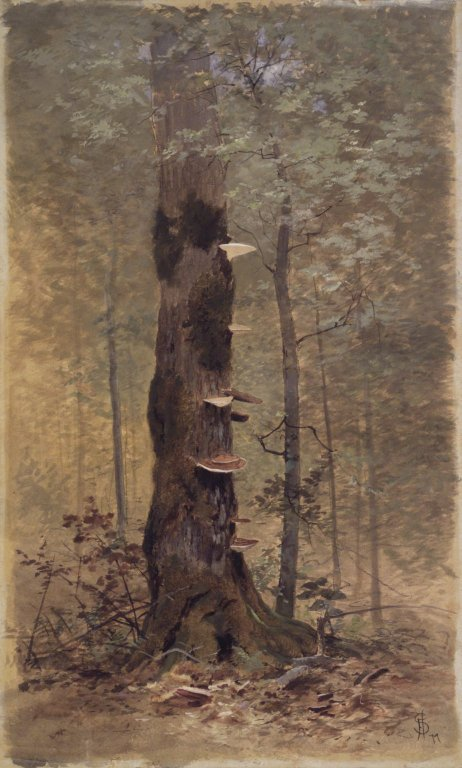
In the Woods by Francis Hopkinson Smith

Francis Hopkinson Smith (October 23, 1838 – April 7, 1915) was an American author, artist, and engineer. He built the foundation for New York City's Statue of Liberty, wrote numerous stories, and received recognition for his paintings.

Smith was the great-uncle of American architect, author, and photographer G. E. Kidder Smith (1913–1997).

== Biography ==
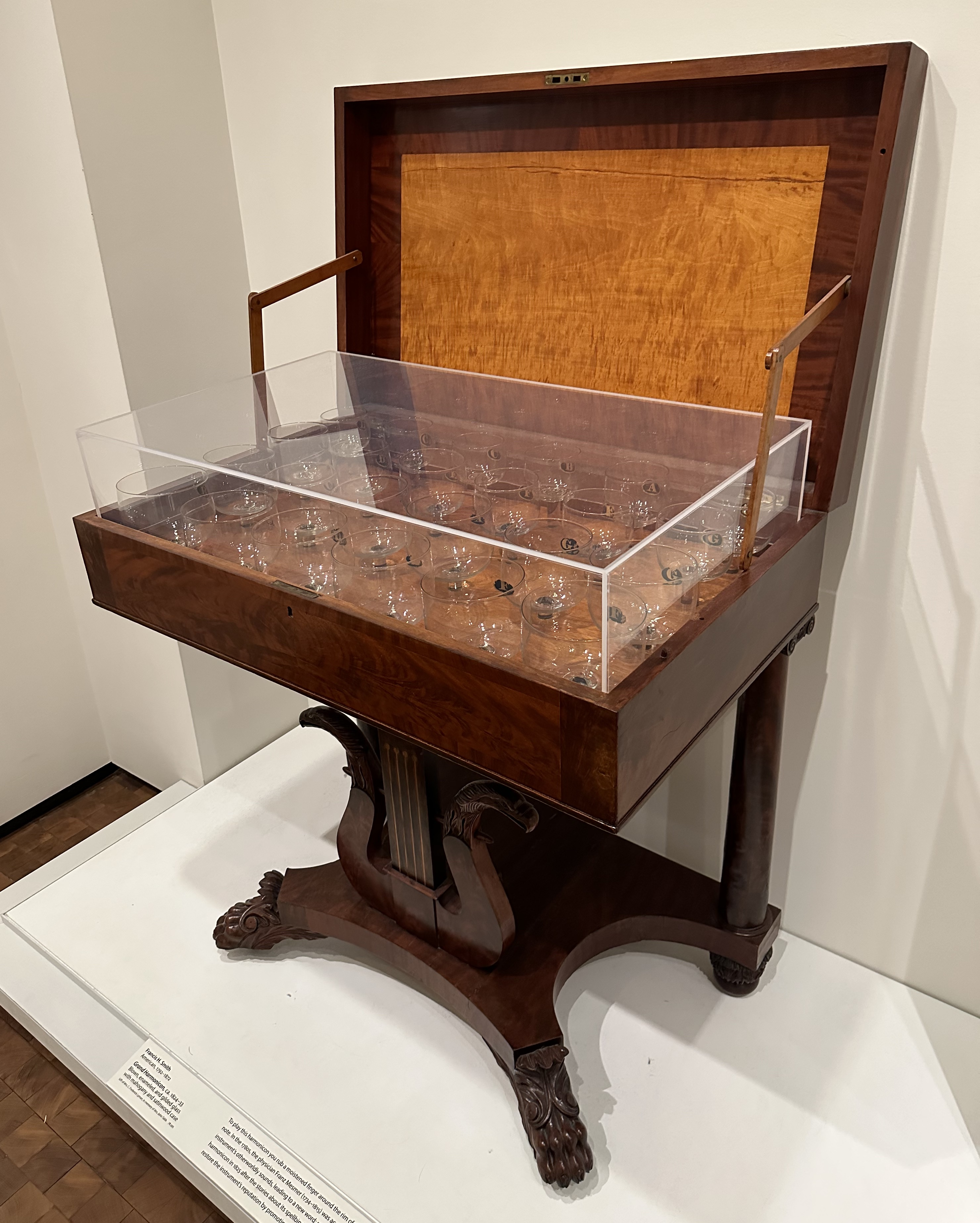
A Grand Harmonicon, a musical instrument invented by Smith, consisting of musical glasses in a wooden stand.

Francis Hopkinson Smith was born in Baltimore, Maryland, on October 23, 1838. He was a descendant of Francis Hopkinson, one of the signers of the Declaration of Independence.

He graduated from the Boys' Latin School of Maryland. In 1914, he argued against African American suffrage, stating that the solution to racial issues would be a return to plantation-era ways.

Smith became a contractor in New York City and worked extensively for the federal government. His projects included the stone ice-breaker at Bridgeport, Connecticut, the jetties at the mouth of the Connecticut River, the foundation for the Bartholdi Statue of Liberty in New York Harbor, the Race Rock Lighthouse (southwest of Fishers Island, New York), and numerous life-saving stations.

During his vacations, Smith traveled widely and sketched landscapes in the White Mountains, Cuba, and Mexico. He also visited and painted scenes from Venice, Constantinople, and the Netherlands.

On April 26, 1866, he married Josephine Van Deventer.

Smith's first popular book was Col. Carter of Cartersville (1891). His 1896 novel Tom Grogan and 1898 novel Caleb West were each the best-selling book in the United States in their respective years of publication.

On March 1, 1915, Smith wrote to the Carmel Arts and Crafts Club in Carmel-by-the-Sea, California, regarding a collection of fifteen of his original paintings that were to be exhibited at the club from June 8 to June 26, 1915. It was his first venture to the American West.

Smith died at his home in New York City on April 7, 1915.

== Selected bibliography ==
He illustrated and published numerous travelogues, including:

- Old Lines in New Black and White (1885)
- Well-Worn Roads (1886)
- A White Umbrella in Mexico (1889)
- Gondola Days (1897)
- The Venice of To-Day (1897)

His novels and short stories are especially felicitous in their portrayal of the Old South. Among them are:

- Col. Carter of Cartersville (1891), which was successfully dramatized
- A Day at La Guerre's and other Days (1892)
- A Gentleman Vagabond and Some Others (1895)(short stories)
- Tom Grogan (1896)
- Caleb West (1898)
- The Other Fellow (1899) (short story collection, including "A Kentucky Cinderella" which was adapted to film in 1917 and 1921)
- The Fortunes of Oliver Horn (1902), which has reminiscences of his artist friends
- The Under Dog (1903) (collection of 13 short stories)
- Col. Carter's Christmas (1904)
- At Close Range (1905)
- The Tides of Barnegat (1906)
- The Veiled Lady (1907)
- The Romance of an Old Fashioned Gentleman (1907)
- Peter (1908)
- Forty Minutes Late and Other Stories (1909)
- Kennedy Square (1911)
- The Arm-chair at The Inn (Charles Scribner's Sons) (1912)
- In Thackeray's London: Pictures and Text (Doubleday, Page & Co.) (1913)
- In Dickens' London (1914).
- Felix O'Day (1915)
- Enoch Crane (1916) (completed by F. Berkeley Smith)

== Selected filmography ==
- Kennedy Square, directed by S. Rankin Drew (1916, based on the novel Kennedy Square)
- The Tides of Barnegat, directed by Marshall Neilan (1917, based on the novel The Tides of Barnegat)
- A Kentucky Cinderella, directed by Rupert Julian (1917, based on the short story A Kentucky Cinderella)
- Felix O'Day, directed by Robert Thornby (1920, based on the novel Felix O'Day)
- Deep Waters, directed by Maurice Tourneur (1920, based on the novel Caleb West)
