= New London Ledge Light =

Lighthouse in Connecticut, United States

New London Ledge Light New London Ledge Light
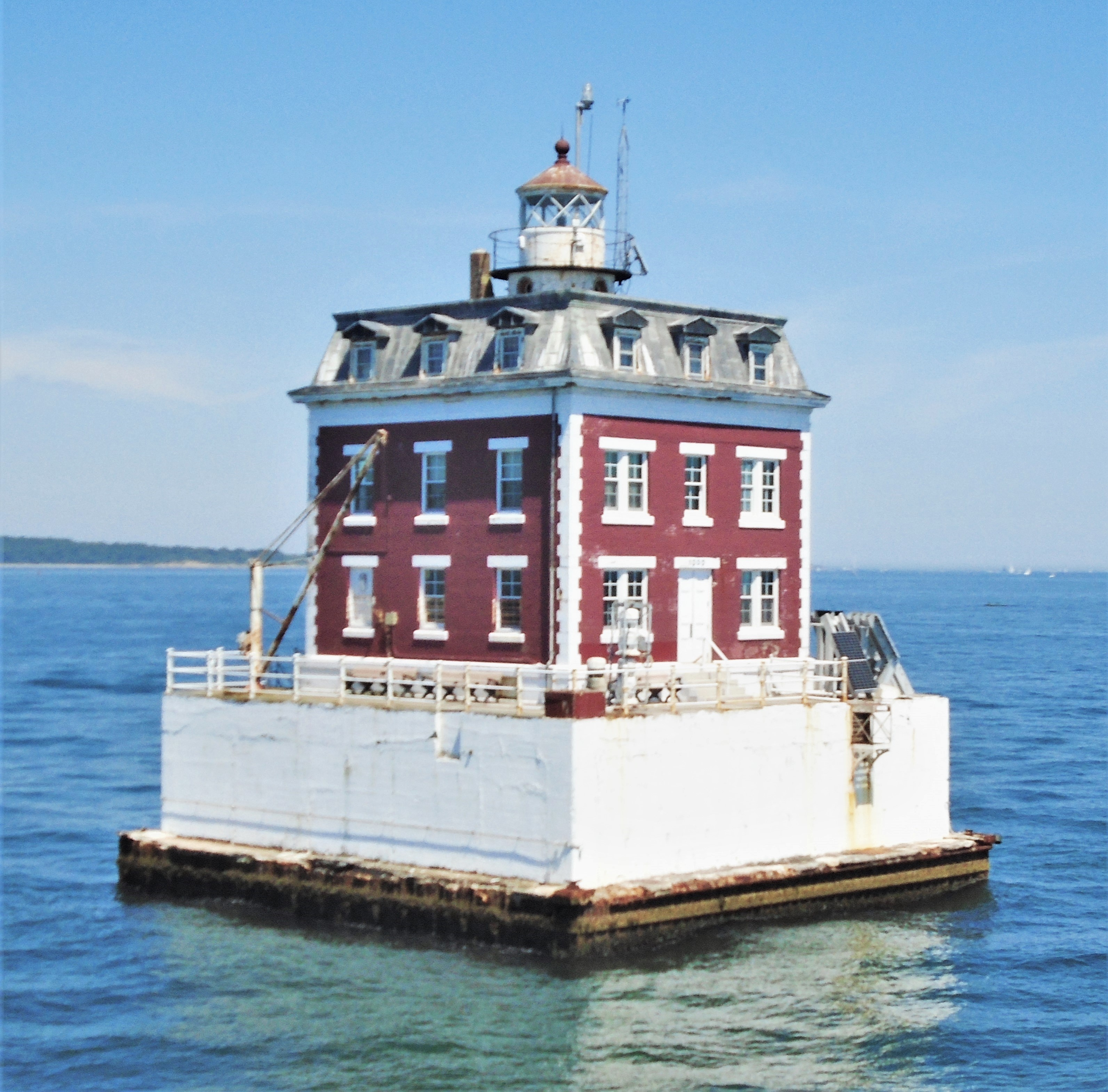
- The lighthouse in 2022
- Location: Thames River; New London Harbor, Connecticut
- Coordinates: 41°18′21.18″N 72°04′38.82″W

Tower
- Constructed: 1909
- Foundation: concrete pier
- Construction: granite and brick building
- Automated: 1987
- Height: 58 ft (18 m)
- Shape: short cylindrical tower on 3-story dwelling
- Markings: white tower, red lantern roof
- Power source: solar power
- Operator: New London Ledge Lighthouse Foundation
- Heritage: National Register of Historic Places listed place

Light
- Focal height: 58 ft (18 m)
- Lens: Fourth order Fresnel lens (original), VRB-25 (current)
- Range: 15 nmi (28 km; 17 mi)
- Characteristic: three white flashes separated by 5 s, 10 s off, red flash, 10 s off
- New London Ledge Lighthouse
- U.S. National Register of Historic Places
- Built: 1909
- Built by: T.A. Scott Company (foundation); Hamilton R. Douglas Company (structure)
- Architectural style: Second Empire
- MPS: Operating Lighthouses in Connecticut MPS
- NRHP reference No.: 89001471
- Added to NRHP: May 29, 1990

New London Ledge Lighthouse is a lighthouse on the Thames River in the U.S. state of Connecticut, at the mouth of New London Harbor. It was built in 1909 in the Second Empire style and was automated in 1987. In 1990, it was added to the National Register of Historic Places. The lighthouse is owned and maintained by the New London Maritime Society as part of the National Historic Lighthouse Preservation Act program.

== History ==
New London Ledge Lighthouse was built in 1909 on the southwest ledge at the mouth of New London Harbor. It was originally called the Southwest Ledge light, but this caused confusion with Southwest Ledge Light in New Haven, Connecticut, so it was renamed New London Ledge Light in 1910. The United States Coast Guard took over in 1939 upon its merger with the Lighthouse Service, and the light was automated in 1987. The original fourth order Fresnel lens was removed and was later put on display in the New London Customhouse museum. The light was added to the National Register of Historic Places in 1990.

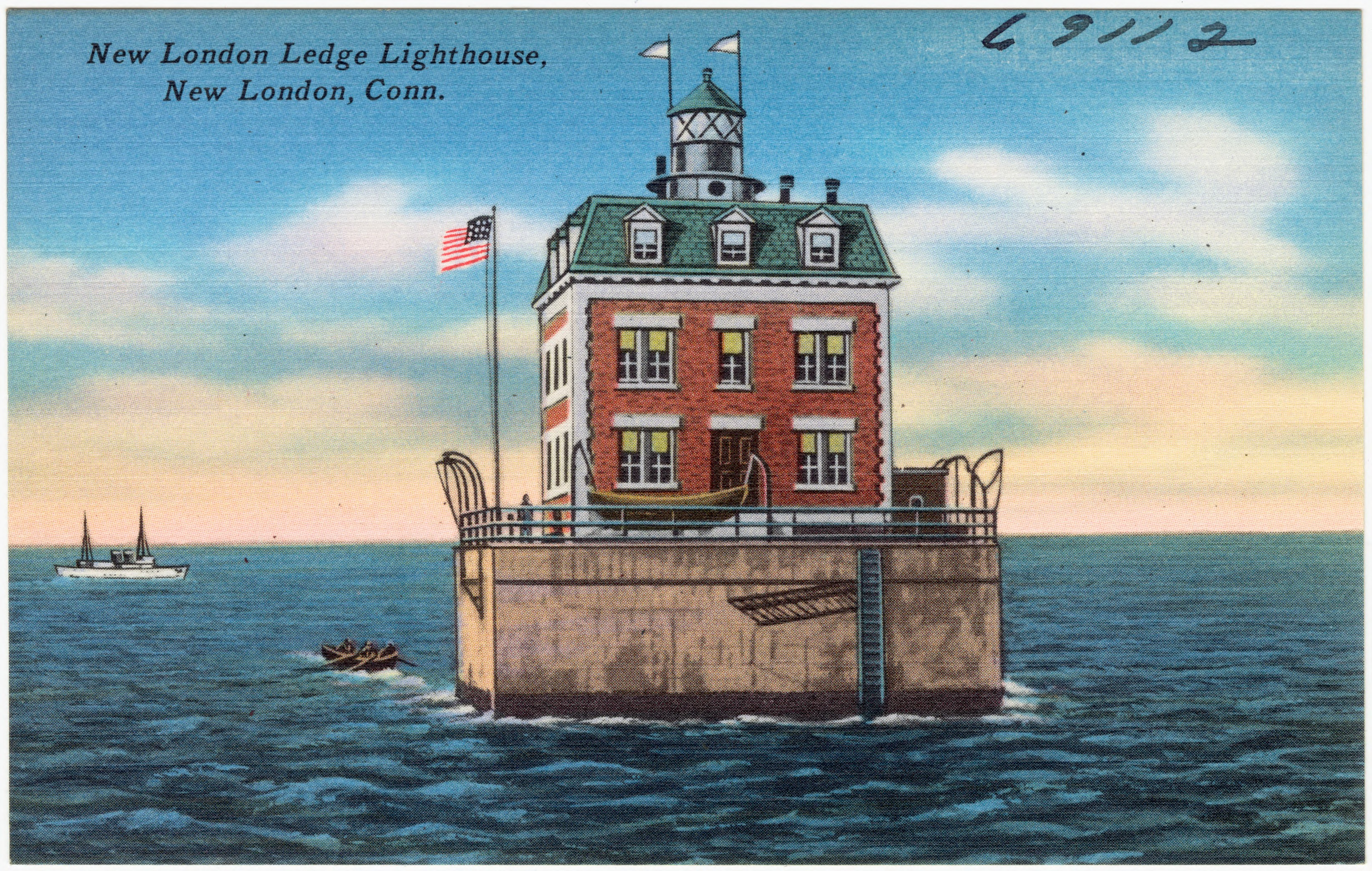
Postcard, c.1930-45

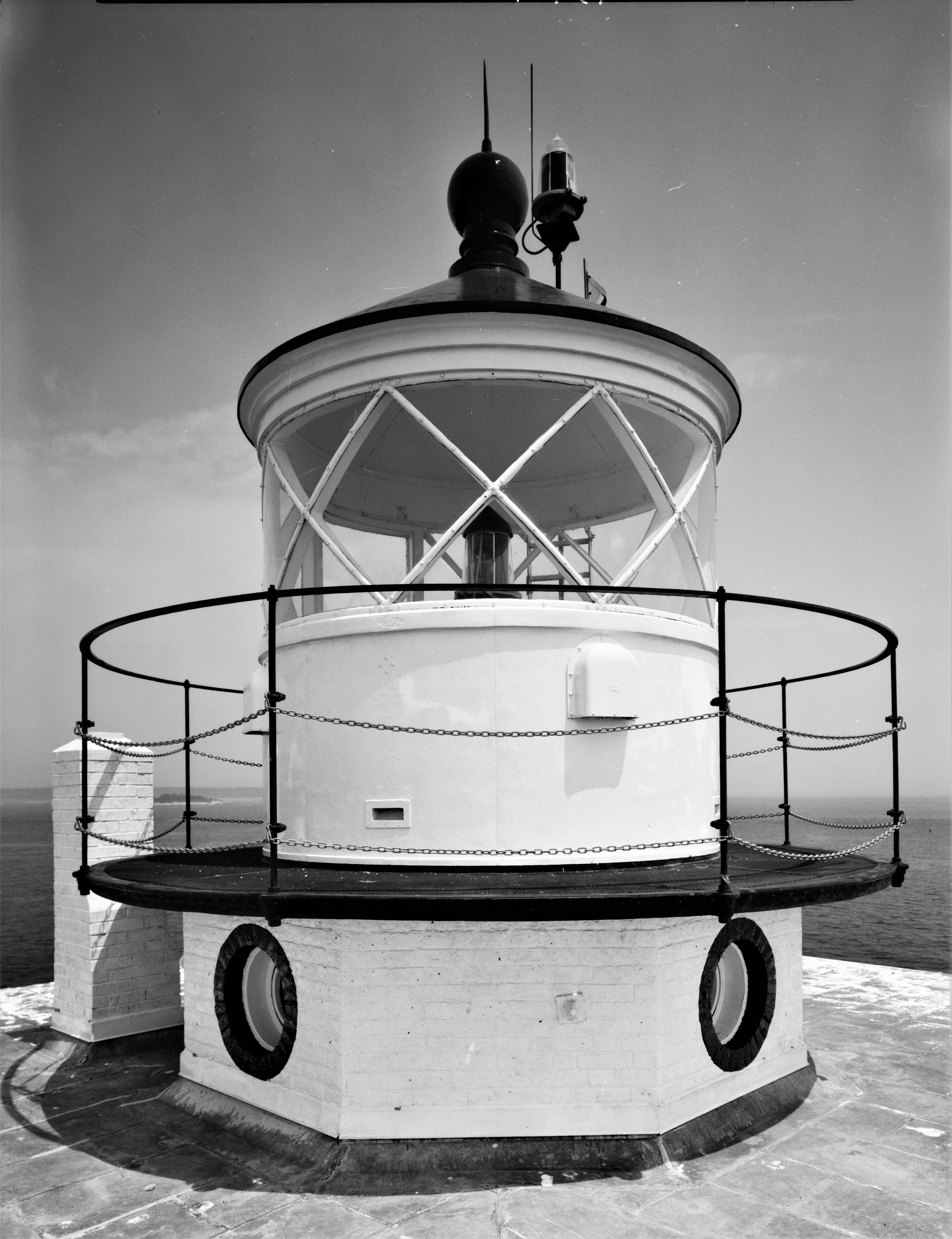
The light's lantern and watch room in 1997

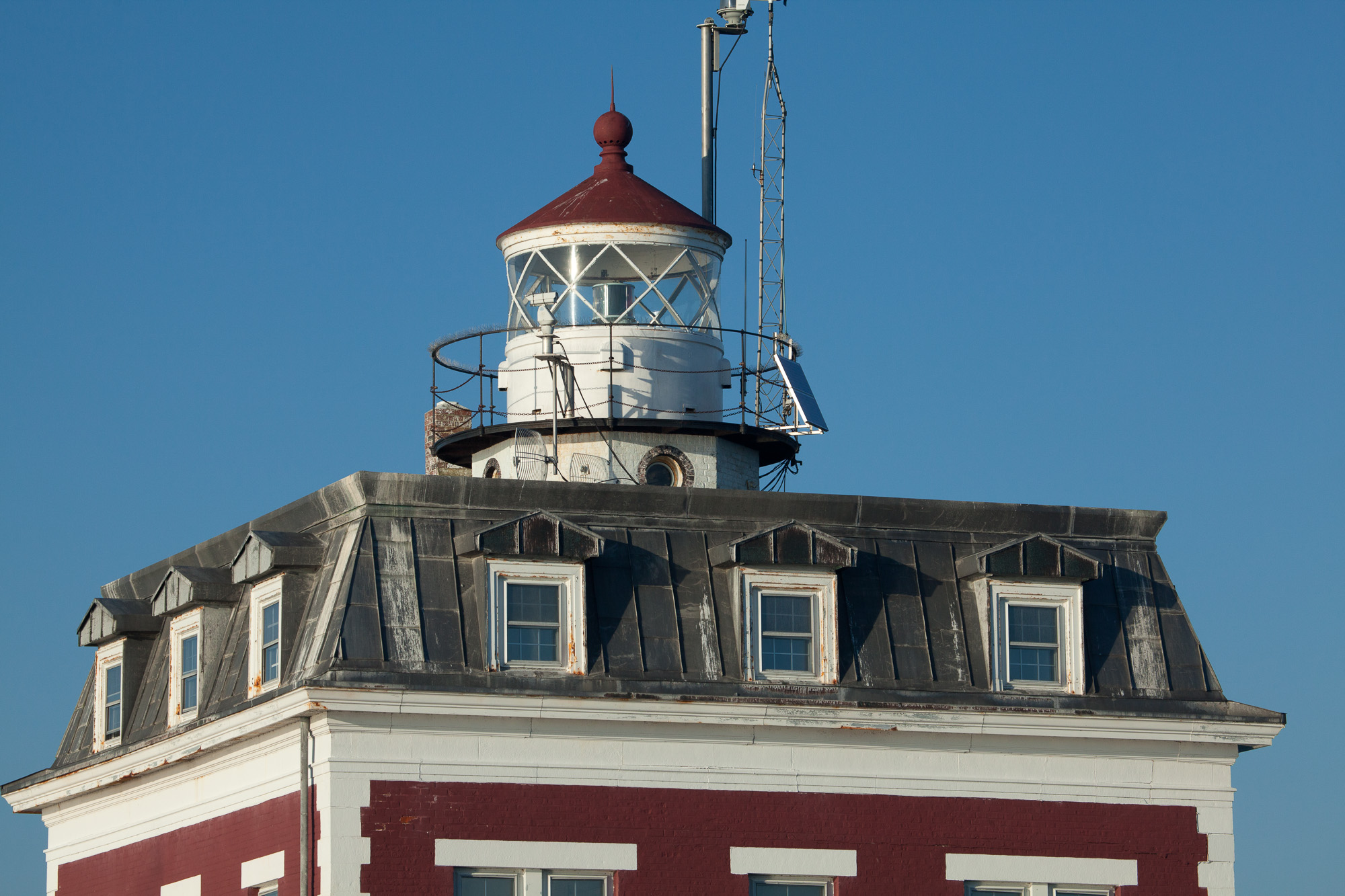
The top of the lighthouse in 2010

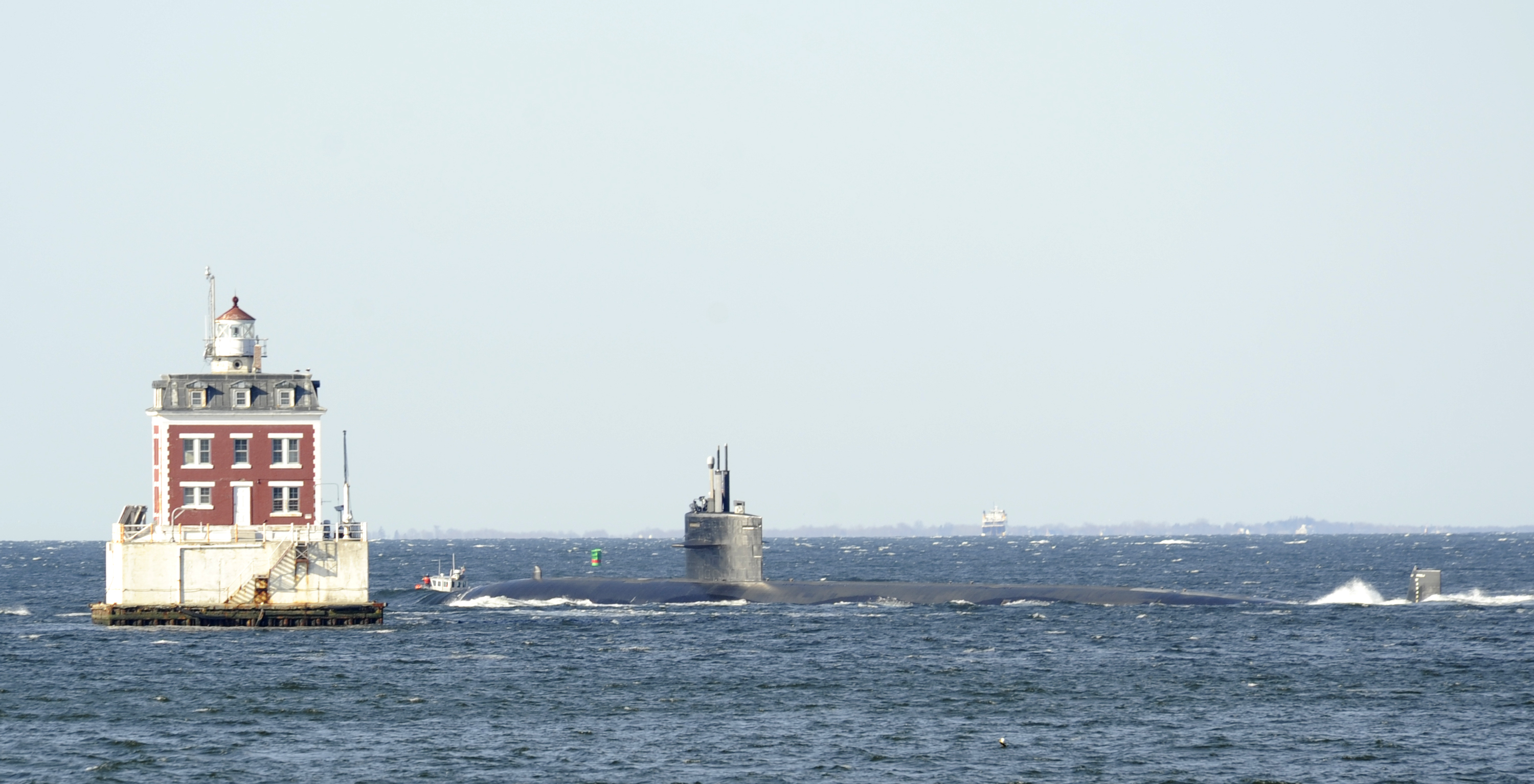
The submarine U.S.S. Memphis passes the light for the final time before being decommissioned in 2011

== Ghost legend ==
Ledge Light has long been the subject of a ghost legend, centering around the supposed spirit of a former keeper named Ernie. The lighthouse has been featured on paranormal reality shows such as Scariest Places on Earth and Ghost Hunters. Investigators from The Atlantic Paranormal Society concluded on Ghost Hunters that there was not enough evidence to determine any paranormal activity taking place at the lighthouse, despite a few unexplained phenomena such as cold spots.

== Head keepers ==
- W.B. Petty (1909 – 1910)
- George E. Hansen (1910 – at least 1917)
- Howard B. Beebe (1926 – 1938)
- Leonard Fuller (at least 1940)
- Michael Scanlan (1943 – 1949)
- William Clark (1954 – 1959)

== See also ==
- List of lighthouses in Connecticut
- List of lighthouses in the United States
- National Register of Historic Places listings in New London County, Connecticut
