= Felix O'Day (novel) =

1915 American novel

Felix O'Day is a 1915 novel by American author Francis Hopkinson Smith. The novel was published posthumously and received positive reception. It was adapted into a 1920 film of the same title.

== Plot ==
Irish baronet Felix O'Day travels to New York City to search for his wife, Barbara, who left him with a man named Dalton more than a year prior. Dalton was also responsible for O'Day losing his fortune. O'Day asks a local priest for help in finding Barbara so that O'Day can help her. Barbara is discovered by Martha, who used to be her nurse, and Martha's brother Stephen after they tried to assist O'Day in finding Barbara. However, the two of them did not know where to find O'Day upon locating Barbara. Barbara now lives in Martha's apartment for protection from Dalton who is abusive. Martha tells Barbara that O'Day is looking for her, leading Barbara to refuse help from him until she changes her mind after learning that O'Day lost his fortune. Barbara believes that she is largely to blame for O'Day descending into poverty. During his search for Barbara, O'Day meets the expressman's wife Kitty Cleary after becoming employed, later befriending her. O'Day is able to reconcile with what happened with the help of his newfound neighbors and later meets Barbara again. The two of them reconcile with each other and O'Day accepts her back into his life.

== Publication and reception ==
The novel was published posthumously by Charles Scribner's Sons. A review from The New York Times said, "Felix O'Day has a simple plot that never relaxes its interest, characters so fully alive that they seem like personal friends, and an optimistic spirit of goodwill that lingers like a strain of sweet music." The Press-Telegram said that the novel is "considered the crowning achievement" of the author's works.The Des Moines Register said, "Gentle and rambling of style, rather than powerful and intense, the book still holds the interest easily from beginning to end." Publishers Weekly listed the novel as the second bestselling book of December 1915 in the United States.

The novel received a film adaptation of the same name in 1920.
