= The Princess Aline =

1895 novelette by Richard Harding Davis

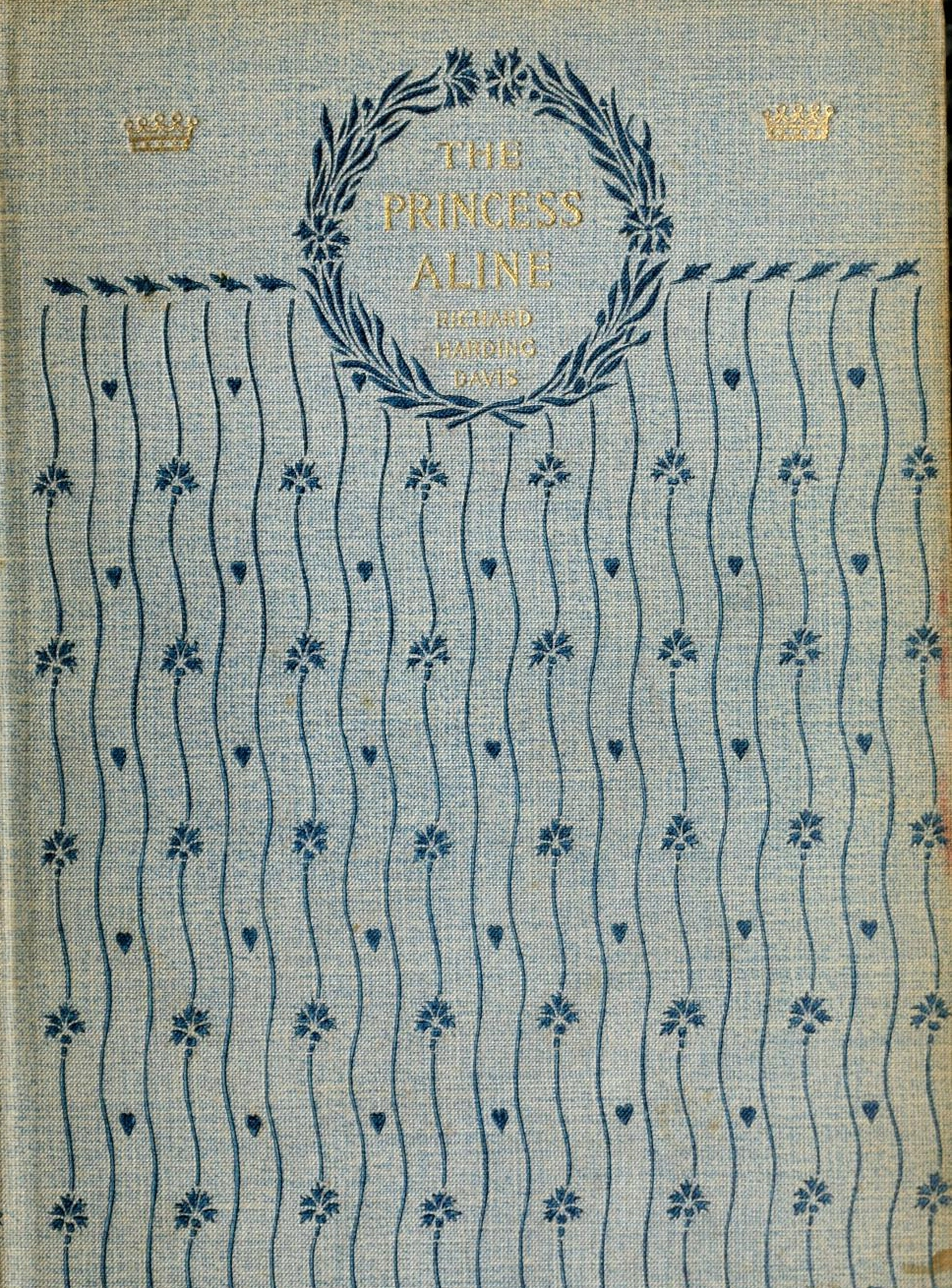
- First edition cover
- Author: Richard Harding Davis
- Illustrator: Charles Dana Gibson
- Language: English
- Publisher: Harper & Brothers
- Publication date: 1895
- Publication place: United States
- Media type: Print (paperback)
- Pages: 163

The Princess Aline is a novella by Richard Harding Davis. The story debuted in Harper's Monthly and was then published in its entirety in 1895, becoming the 5th-best selling novel in the United States for that year.

The Princess Aline originally ran as a serial in the January through March 1895 issues of Harper's Monthly with illustrations by Charles Dana Gibson.

Title page illustration by Gibson

The plot is about a prominent and well-off artist in America in his early 20s who sets off for Europe on a steamship to try and meet a princess he becomes enthralled with from a picture. He is joined by companions he meets along the journey.

== Reception ==
A blurb in Harper's from 1895 excerpted fawning reviews of the book including one from Boston Traveller that applauded the work's humorous whimsy, ingenuity and delicate pathos. The New York Times called it a "little story ... to be commended, first of all, as a charming and lucid record of travel" and also "as a charming love story." And although the Princess Aline of the story "is not a myth," the Times saw parallels to the popular 1869 short story "Majorie Daw" by Thomas Bailey Aldrich.

The Library of the World’s Best Literature (1917 edition) states: "The book is written in a clever, crisp style, and shows much worldly knowledge."

== Story development and royal reviews ==
The story was inspired by Davis' infatuation with Princess Alix of Hesse-Darmstadt, Czarina of Russia. Alix was also the granddaughter of Queen Victoria, and Davis was told by a royal attendant that the Queen and her daughters had read and enjoyed his book. When Davis asked whether they approved of his ending, where the Princess does not marry the commoner, he was told "of course", as "they realized that no other conclusion would have been possible."

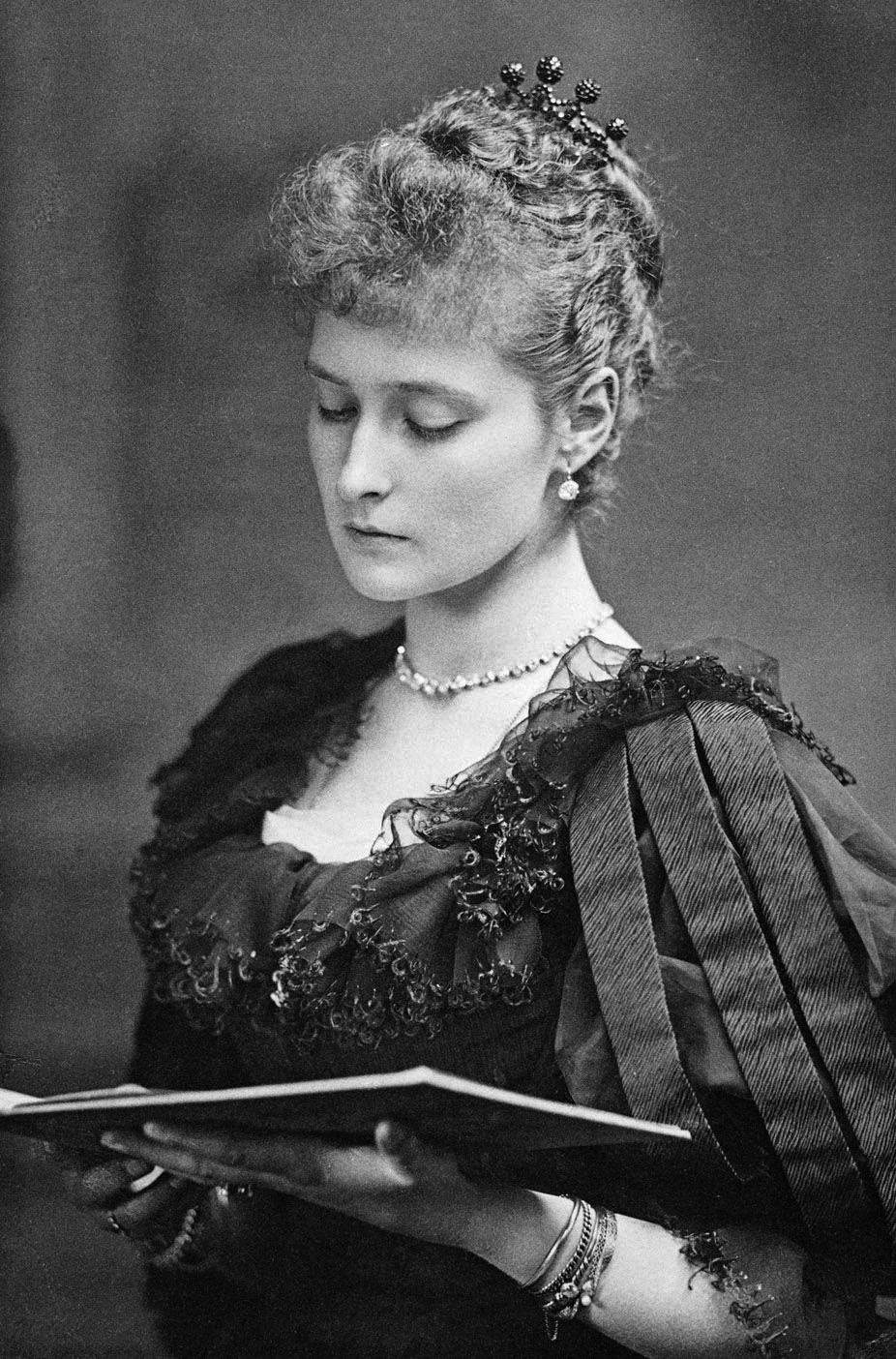
Princess Alix, the inspiration for Princess Aline

It was noted when the story was published that Princess Aline seemed to resemble Princess Alix, and that the illustrations of the book's hero by Gibson looked quite like Davis himself.

== See also ==
- Publishers Weekly list of bestselling novels in the United States in the 1890s
