= Fishers Island Union Free School District =

School district in Fishers Island, New York

Address
- 78 Greenwood Road #600 Fishers Island, New York, 06390; United States

District information
- Type: Public
- Grades: PreK–12
- NCES District ID: 3611100

Students and staff
- Students: 56
- Teachers: 12.0
- Staff: 8.2
- Student–teacher ratio: 5.58

Other information
- Website: www.fischool.com

The Fishers Island Union Free School District is a school district headquartered in Fishers Island, New York. It consists of a single K-12 school, Fishers Island School.

The school district itself consists of all of Fishers Island – an area located within the Town of Southold. The school also functions as a magnet school for out of state students.

== History ==
The school population declined by about 50 when the U.S. Army closed its base on Fishers Island. The depopulation meant that some grade levels were not taught at times as zero students existed for those grades. The current facility opened in 1974. In 1997 area residents continued to call it "the new school" even though it was built in the 1970s. It began admitting out of state students in 1987.

== Campuses ==
In 1997 the school had an IBM compatible computer lab and an Apple Macintosh computer lab. Verde referred to that as something typical of a private school.

== Operations ==
As of 1997 taxation provides most of the school's revenues, with additional money from tuition.

== Admissions ==
The Fishers Island Union Free School District allows people living in mainland Connecticut and Rhode Island to send their children to the school.

In 1997 annual tuition was $1,750. In 2012 it charged $3,400 each year per out off state student. A parent of a student would additionally pay $1,500 each year for tickets for the ferry. By 2019 annual tuition was about $5,000. Residents of New York State (that is residents of Fishers Island) attend for free.

The school aims to have class sizes up to ten, so therefore according to Candice Rudd of Newsday admissions have become "competitive".

== Curriculum ==
In 1997 the school had art and music classes that, by that year, had been cut by several schools on the mainland. The taxation revenue allows the school to have these courses.

== Student body ==
Students who attend include those from, in addition to Fishers Island, those from Connecticut towns of Mystic, New London, Noank, Stonington, and Waterford.

The school separates students into two groups: Pre-K to 6th grade (elementary), and 7th to 12th grade (high school). Students in the elementary group are usually in combined classes, with the groups being Pre-K, K-2nd grade, 3rd-4th grade, and 5th-6th grade. The 5th to 6th grade group is sometimes referred to as the "middle school class." In the high school group, students have normal curriculum for that grade but have the responsibilities of a high schooler. These including walking from class to class, being able to walk around the island after school while waiting for the ferry, and being able to stand outside on the ferry.

In 1997 it had 79 students, with 27 students from Connecticut. In 2004 it had 72 students, with almost 24 from Connecticut. In 2011 the school had a total of 65 students, with about 50% living in Connecticut. In 2019 the school had 30 students from Connecticut. Circa 2021 enrollment is about 70. As of the 2025-26 school year, the school has 55 students, 27 from the island and 28 from Connecticut. 24 are in PK-6th grade and 31 are in 7th to 12th grade.

In 1997 Cornelius O'Connell, the principal, stated that several parents living off-island specifically liked the middle school curriculum and therefore sent their children to Fishers Island School for grades 6–8.

As of 2026 secondary classes may have class sizes of three to six students.

== Teaching staff ==
As of 2004 some teachers commute from Connecticut.

== Academic performance ==
It got high test scores in 1997: its 6th grade reading scores in 1996 had all four students pass - a 100% pass rate. Tom Verde of The New York Times stated that the "low student-teacher ratio[...] and one of the highest per-pupil expenditure rates in the state, [...]contributed to the school's reputation."

== Transportation ==
Out of state students use a ferry to go to and from the school. While the school day ends at 2:51, the ferry does not arrive until about 4:20, and doesn't leave until 4:45. Students who live on the island leave school at 2:51, while students who live in Connecticut must stay. For the elementary group, an after school club is supervised by an adult. In this club, children play inside, watch movies, and enjoy the playground. In the high school group, students are allowed to freely roam the school and even roam about the island. This also leaves time for extra-curricular activities like clubs which could be hosted by both teachers and students. Some students do their homework on the ferry. Days of high wind can affect ferry operations.

== Extracurricular activity ==
The school has fewer high school organized sports and band activities relative to mainland schools. During each season, there is a sport that students can participate in. For fall, there is a cross country team. For winter, there is a basketball team. For spring, there is a golf team that travels to a country club to practice. Students also take senior trips outside of the United States. These trips are funded by constant fundraising led by the students and their class advisor starting in 7th grade. The latter two aspects and campus features were ones Verde referred to as being something typical of private schools.
