= Felix O'Day (film) =

1920 film by Robert Thornby

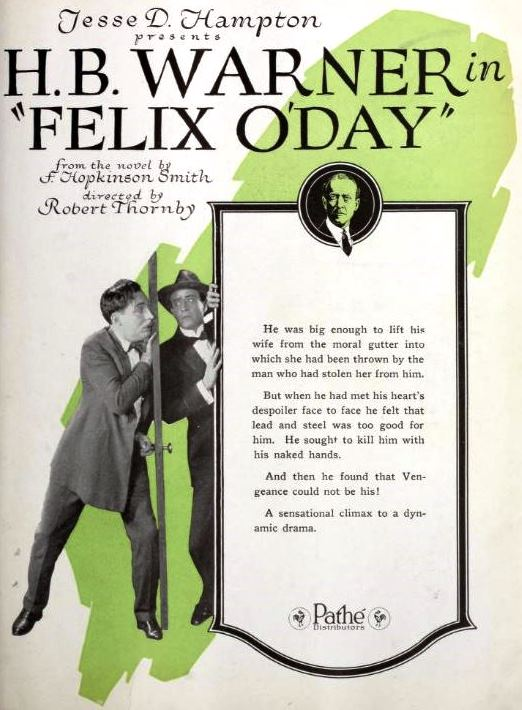
- poster
- Directed by: Robert Thornby
- Written by: Fred Myton
- Based on: novel by F. Hopkinson Smith
- Produced by: Jesse D. Hampton
- Starring: H. B. Warner
- Cinematography: Victor Milner
- Distributed by: Pathé Exchange
- Release date: September 12, 1920
- Running time: 5 reels
- Country: USA
- Language: Silent (English intertitles)

Felix O'Day is a 1920 silent drama film directed by Robert Thornby and starring H. B. Warner. The film was released through Pathé Exchange. It is based on a novel of the same name.

== Cast ==
- H. B. Warner as Felix O'Day
- Marguerite Snow as Lady Barbara O'Day
- Lillian Rich as Annette Borney
- Ray Ripley as Austin Bennett
- Karl Formes as Jules Borney
- George B. Williams

== Preservation ==
Felix O'Day is currently presumed lost. In February of 2021, the film was cited by the National Film Preservation Board on their Lost U.S. Silent Feature Films list.
