= Margaret Ogilvy =

1897 book by J. M. Barrie

Margaret Ogilvy: Life Is a Long Lesson in Humility
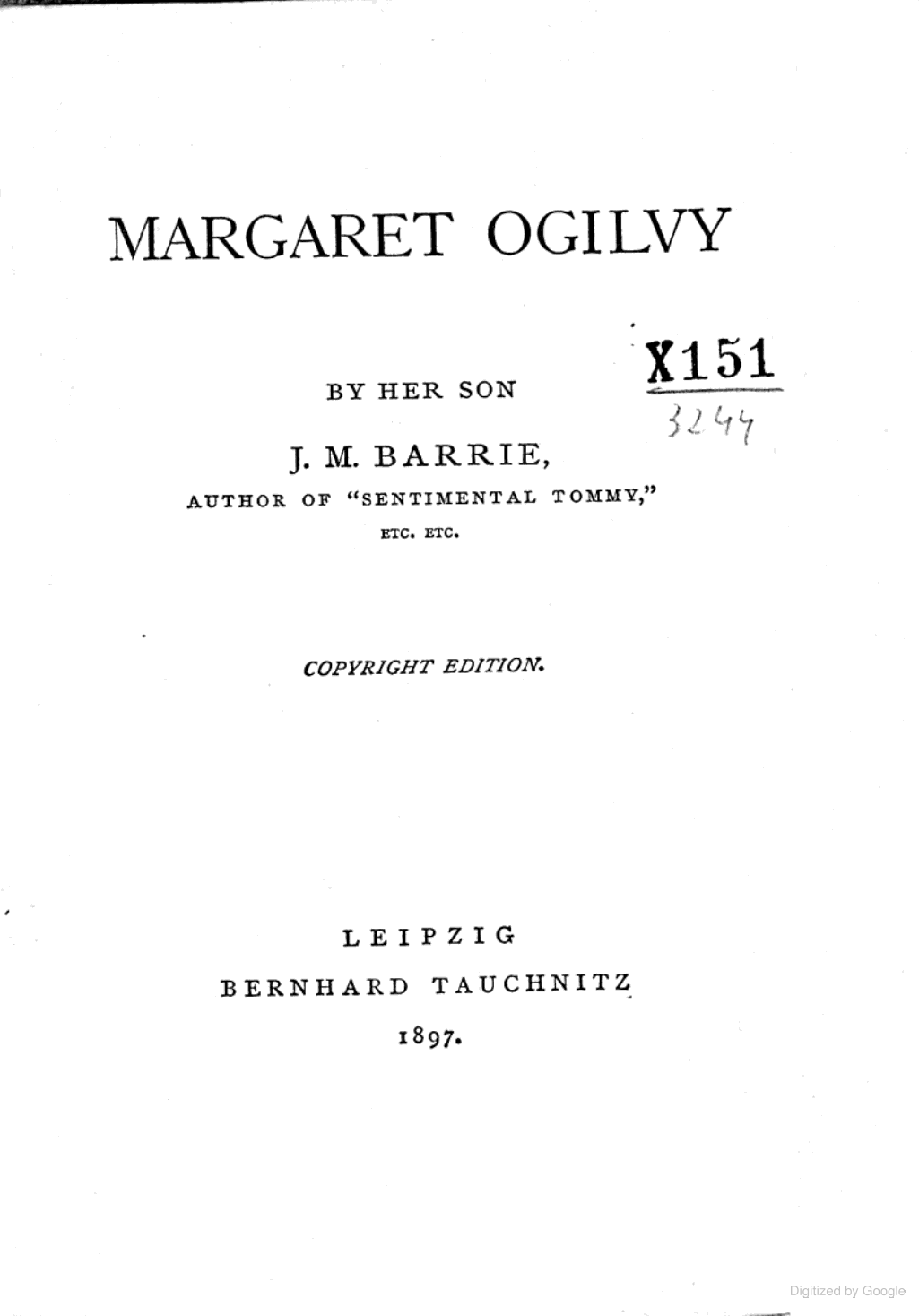
- Author: J. M. Barrie
- Language: English
- Subject: Margaret Ogilvy
- Genre: Biography
- Publication date: 1897 (approximately)

Margaret Ogilvy: Life Is a Long Lesson in Humility is a biographical book written in the late-19th century by J. M. Barrie, about his mother and family life in Scotland.

According to The Bookman literary journal, the book was the seventh-bestselling book of 1897 in the United States.

The book was written in tribute to Barrie's mother and includes family reminiscences. In the book, Barrie recounts his mother telling tales of her childhood, and credits her with inspiring his interest in literature.

== See also ==
- Publishers Weekly list of bestselling novels in the United States in the 1890s
