= The Adventures of Captain Horn =

1895 novel by Frank R. Stockton

- Author: Frank R. Stockton
- Publisher: Scribner
- Publication date: 1895
- Pages: 404
- OCLC: 1583097
- LC Class: PS2927 .A38 1895

The Adventures of Captain Horn is an 1895 adventure novel by Frank R. Stockton published by Charles Scribner's Sons. It was the third-best selling book in the United States in 1895. The sequel Mrs. Cliff's Yacht was released in 1897.

== Summary ==
In the early spring of 1884, the three-masted schooner Castor, en route from San Francisco to Valparaiso, encountered a violent tornado off the coast of Peru. The storm, which struck with terrifying swiftness, was brief but devastating. It left the Castor in ruins, her masts snapped and lost overboard, her rudder shattered by the falling debris. The ship was left adrift, rolling in the sea's trough as the floating remnants of her masts and spars battered against her sides.

After the Castor is wrecked, Captain Philip Horn and the surviving passengers and crew struggle for survival on the desolate Peruvian coast. As they make their way inland, they face natural hazards and encounters with hostile groups, and must rely on their courage and resourcefulness to overcome adversity while searching for safety and rescue.
