= Tom Grogan =

Book by Francis Hopkinson Smith

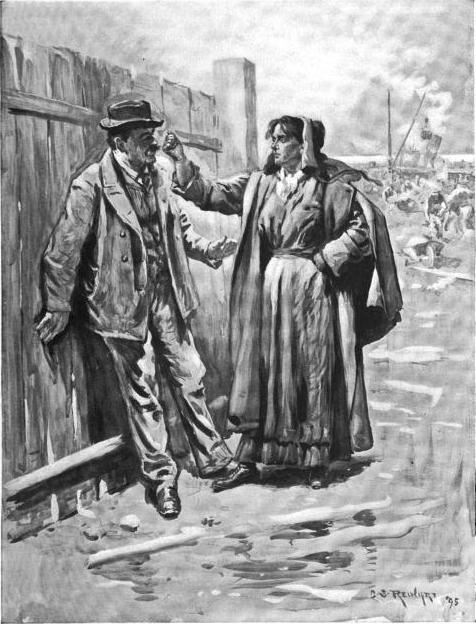
- Illustration by Charles Stanley Reinhart appearing in serialization of Tom Grogan in The Century
- Author: Francis Hopkinson Smith
- Language: English
- Genre: Novel
- Publication date: 1896
- Publication place: United States
- Media type: Print (Hardcover)
- Pages: 211 pp

Tom Grogan is a novel published in 1896 by Francis Hopkinson Smith. It was the bestselling book in the United States in 1896 according to Publishers Weekly. The novel was adapted into a play in 1896. An art print of the book cover is held in the Library of Congress.

== Plot ==
An 1898 literature guide provided this synopsis of the plot:

Tom Grogan, by F. Hopkinson Smith (1895.) is a spirited and most entertaining and ingenious study of laboring life in Staten Island, New York.

Tom Grogan was a stevedore, who died from the effects of an injury. With a family to support, his widow conceals the fact of her husband's death, saying that he is sick in a hospital, that she may assume both his name and business.

She is thenceforth known to all as 'Tom Grogan'. A sturdy, cheery, capable Irishwoman, she carries on the business with an increasing success, which arouses the jealous opposition of some rival stevedores and walking delegates of the labor union, which she has refused to join.

The story tells how, with marvelous pluck, Tom meets all the contemptible means which her enemies employ in order to down her, they resorting even to the law, blackmail, arson, and attempted murder. In all her mannish employments her mother-heart beats warm and true, and her little crippled Patsy, a companion to Dickens's Tiny Tim, and Jenny the daughter with her own tender love affair, are objects of Tom's constant solicitude.

The author has given a refreshing view of a soul of heroic mold beneath an uncouth exterior, and a pure life where men are wont to expect degradation.

== Publication history ==
The story was initially serialized in The Century Magazine starting in December 1895, with illustrations by Charles Stanley Reinhart. It was published in 1896 by Houghton Mifflin Harcourt. In 1896, Munsey's Magazine said the publishers expected the novel to be popular.

== Reception ==
The novel was the best selling novel in the United States in 1896 according to Publishers Weekly.

The Philadelphia Inquirer said, "Mr. Smith attempts nothing further than to portray a masterful woman, more competent in lines of business usually left to men than the men themselves are, and the mean and cowardly methods used by them to prevent her success." The Standard Union wrote that the novel "shows the same appreciation of character, the same quaint and original humor, and the same tender touch which has marked the literature already given by Mr. Smith to the world." A review from The New York Times said, "Hopkinson Smith's Staten Island story has as much "local color" and vitality as his Colonel Carter".

== Post-publication ==
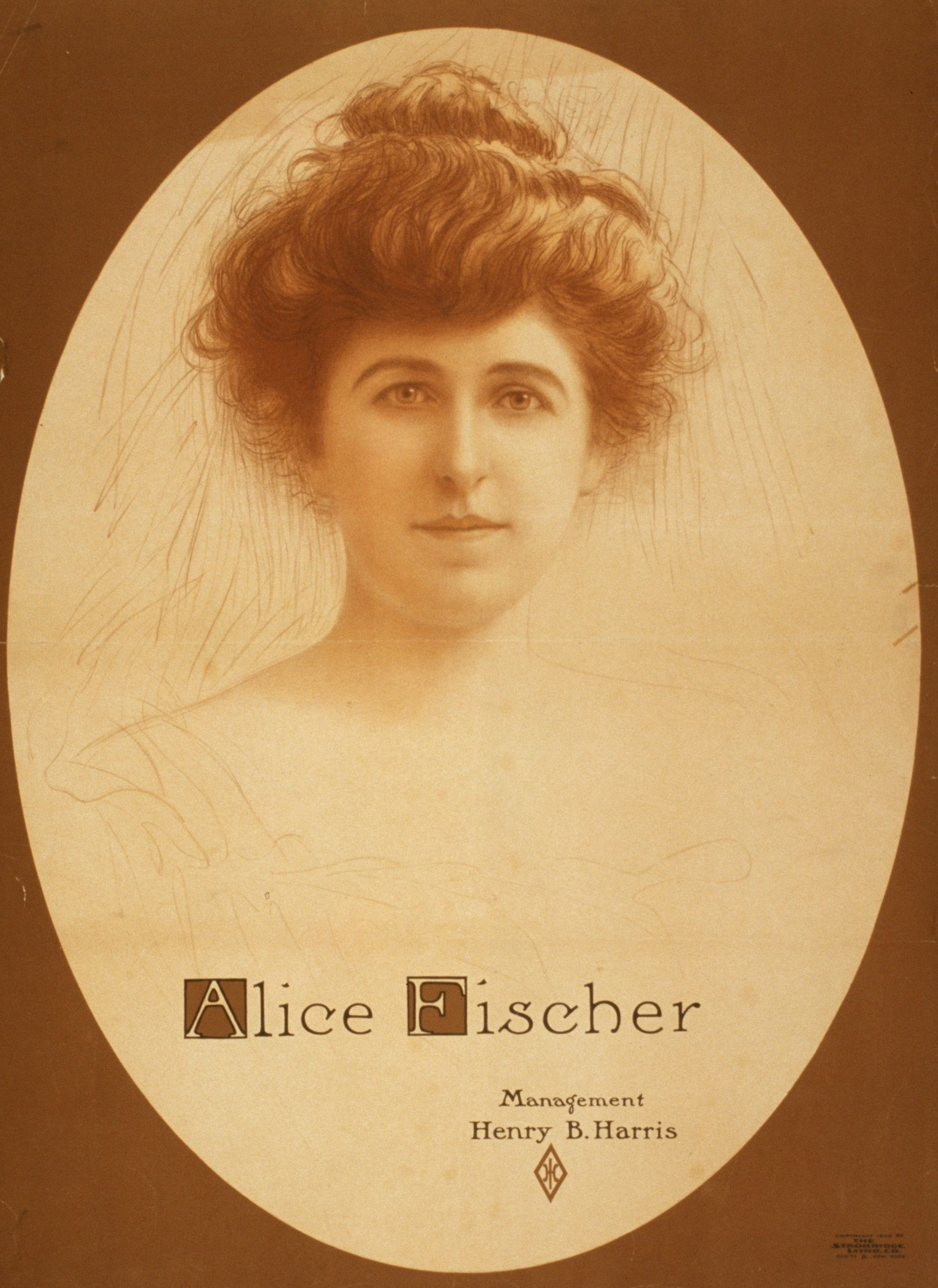
Alice Fischer

The book was adapted into a play in 1896 with Alice Fischer starring as Tom Grogan. The play kept the main points of the book, but deviated somewhat from the source material. People who knew the actress said that the role suits her. The Parsons Independent wrote that Fischer "has an off-hand breezy, self-certain manner, and she has the sentiment." The novel was listed in Library of the World's Best Literature in 1898. In December 1899, Smith read a condensed version of the novel at the Association Hall in New York City to Brooklyn Institute members and their friends. An art print of the cover is held in the Library of Congress as part of its Artist poster filing series.
