= Race Rock Light =

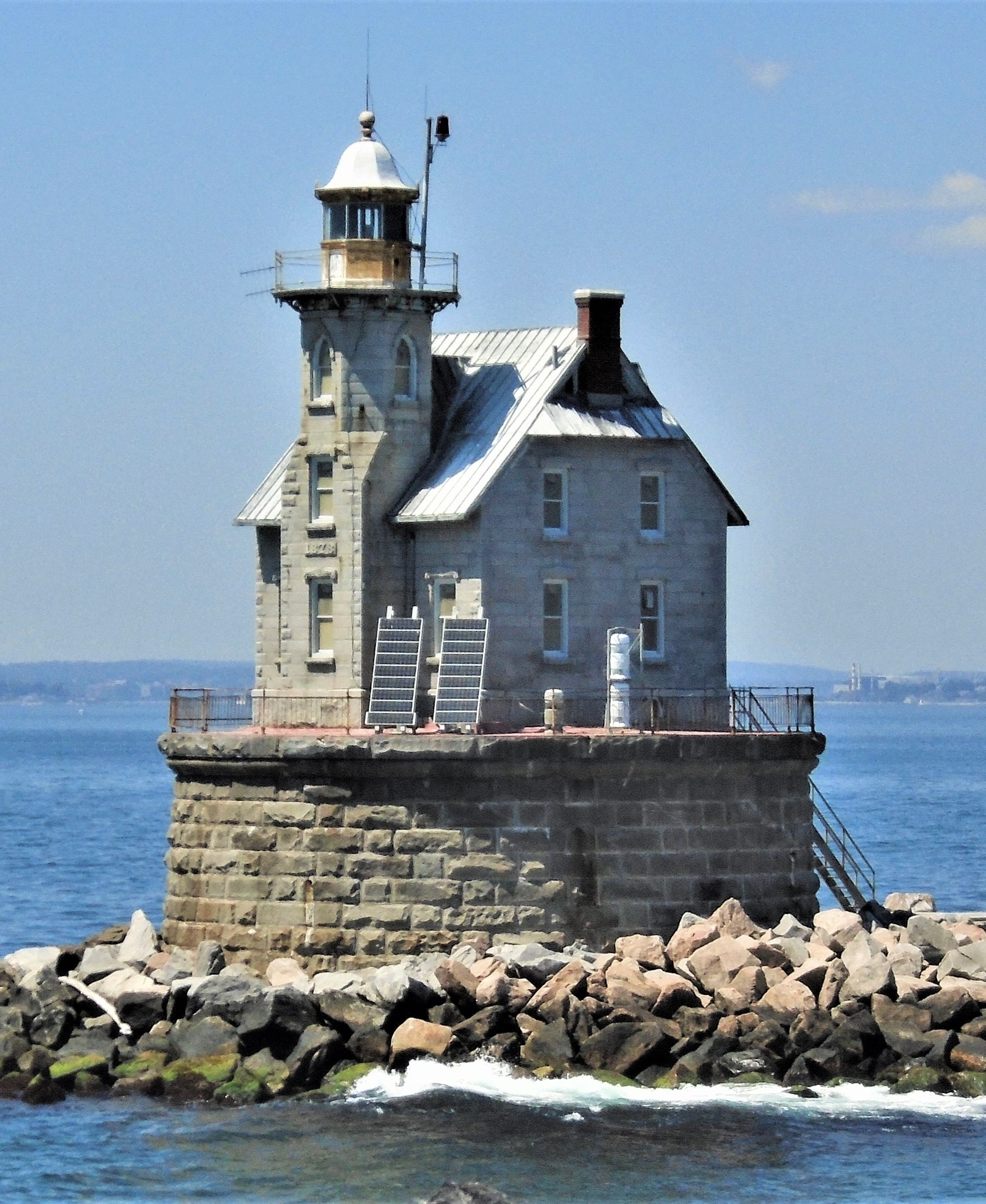
- (2022)
- Location: Entrance to Long Island sound
- Coordinates: 41°14′36.6″N 72°2′49.2″W

Tower
- Constructed: 1878
- Foundation: Granite and concrete caisson and pier.
- Construction: Granite
- Automated: 1978
- Height: 45 feet (14 m)
- Shape: Square/octagonal
- Markings: Natural color with white lantern
- Heritage: National Register of Historic Places listed place
- Fog signal: Fog Horn points southeast. HORN: 2 every 30s

Light
- First lit: 1879
- Deactivated: Active
- Focal height: 67 feet (20 m)
- Lens: Fourth order Fresnel lens
- Range: 16 nautical miles (30 km; 18 mi)
- Characteristic: Flashing Red 10s
- Race Rock Light Station
- U.S. National Register of Historic Places
- Nearest city: Fishers Island, New York
- Area: less than one acre
- Architect: Francis Hopkinson Smith
- Architectural style: Gothic Revival
- MPS: Light Stations of the United States MPS
- NRHP reference No.: 05000347
- Added to NRHP: April 29, 2005

Race Rock Light is a lighthouse on Race Rock Reef, a dangerous set of rocks in the Long Island Sound southwest of Fishers Island, New York and the site of many shipwrecks. It is currently owned and maintained by the New London Maritime Society as part of the National Historic Lighthouse Preservation Act program.

Race Rock Light was built 1871–78 and designed by Francis Hopkinson Smith (1838–1915). It is an excellent example of 19th-century engineering and design. The massive masonry foundations on the reef took seven years to complete, but the stone structure, the keeper's quarters, and the tower were built in only nine months once the foundation was secure. The lighthouse has a fourth-order Fresnel lens in a tower standing 67 feet (20 m) above the waterline. The United States Coast Guard automated the light in 1978.

Race Rock Lighthouse was added to the National Register of Historic Places in 2005.

== History ==
Race Rock Lighthouse stands in Long Island Sound, 8 miles (13 km) from New London, Connecticut, at the mouth of the Race where the waters of the Sound rush both ways with great velocity and force. By 1837, eight vessels had been lost in 8 years on Race Point reef.

In 1838, Congress appropriated $3,000 for a lighthouse at Race Rock but the money was never expended. In 1852, the Lighthouse Board reported: "Various efforts have been made, and numerous appropriations expended, in endeavoring to place an efficient and permanent mark on this point. Buoys cannot be kept on it, and spindles have hitherto only remained until the breaking up of the ice in the spring."

Construction of the riprap foundation began in April 1871. In all, 10,000 tons of granite were used in the foundation. The Board reported in 1872 that the building costs were so high that "no more than the landing and the enrockment of the foundation, and two courses of the pier" could be paid for. Congress appropriated a further $75,000 in 1873, and the lighthouse was completed at a total cost of $278,716.

The ledge on which the lighthouse is built is under water and 3/4 mile from Race Point Reef. It was made approximately level with small broken stones and riprap. Upon this was placed a circular-stepped mass of concrete, 9 feet (2.7 m) thick, built in four concentric layers. To form the layers of concrete, cylindrical bands of half-inch iron were used. The upper surface of the concrete is 8 inches (200 mm) above mean low water and carries a conical pier that is 30 feet (9.1 m) high, 57 feet (17 m) in diameter at the base, and crowned by a projecting coping 55 feet (17 m) in diameter. The pier is made of heavy masonry backed with concrete and contains cisterns and cellars.

The pier is surmounted by a 1 1/2 story granite dwelling, and the granite light tower ascends from its front. The whole structure is surrounded and protected by riprap. The tower is square at the base and octagonal at the top; it carries a fourth-order alternating electric light, standing 67 feet (20 m) above sea level and 45 feet (14 m) above land, and visible 14 nautical miles (26 km; 16 mi) at sea.

It was added to the National Register of Historic Places in 2005 as Race Rock Light Station. In June 2011, the General Services Administration made the Race Rock Light available at no cost to public organizations willing to preserve them as part of the National Historic Lighthouse Preservation Act program. The New London Maritime society took ownership of Race Rock and two other lighthouses that mark the approach to New London, Connecticut.

== See also ==
- List of lighthouses in the United States
