= Frank R. Stockton =

American novelist (1834–1902)

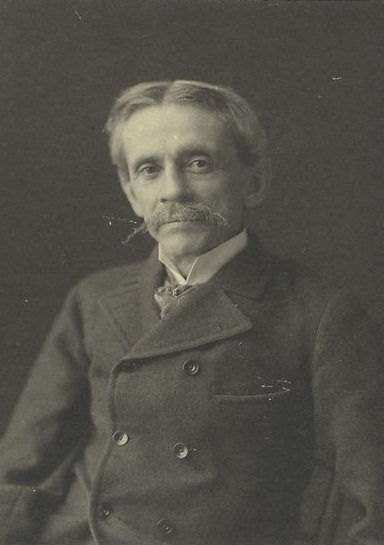
- Frank Richard Stockton
- Born: Frank Richard Stockton; April 5, 1834; Philadelphia, U.S.
- Died: April 20, 1902 (aged 68); Washington, DC, U.S.
- Resting place: The Woodlands, Philadelphia
- Occupations: Humorist, writer
- Relatives: Louise Stockton (sister)
- Writing career
- Genre: Children's literature

Frank Richard Stockton (April 5, 1834 – April 20, 1902) was an American writer and humorist, best known today for a series of innovative children's fairy tales that were widely popular during the last decades of the 19th century.

== Life ==
Stockton was born in Philadelphia in 1834, the son of a prominent Methodist minister who discouraged him from a writing career. For years, he supported himself as a wood engraver until his father's death in 1860. Before his fathers death, he married Mary Ann Edwards Tuttle and moved to Burlington, New Jersey, where he produced his first literary work. The couple then moved to Nutley, New Jersey.

In 1867, he moved back to Philadelphia to write for a newspaper founded by his brother. His first fairy tale was "Ting-a-ling", published that year in The Riverside Magazine; his first book collection appeared in 1870. He was also an editor for Hearth and Home magazine in the early 1870s. Around 1899, he moved to Charles Town, West Virginia.

Stockton died in Washington, D.C. on April 20, 1902 of a cerebral hemorrhage. He is buried at The Woodlands in Philadelphia.

== Writings ==
Stockton avoided the didactic moralizing common to children's stories of the time. Instead, he humorously poked fun at greed, violence, abuse of power, and other human foibles, describing his fantastic characters' adventures in a charming, matter-of-fact way in stories such as "The Griffin and the Minor Canon" (1885) and "The Bee-Man of Orn" (1887). These two stories were republished in 1963 and 1964 in editions illustrated by Maurice Sendak. "The Griffin and the Minor Canon" won a Lewis Carroll Shelf Award in 1963.

Stockton's most famous short story was "The Lady, or the Tiger?" (1882), about a man sentenced to an unusual punishment for having a romance with a king's daughter. The man is taken to the public arena where he is faced with two doors, and he must choose which door will open. Behind one of them is a hungry tiger that will devour him; behind the other is a beautiful lady-in-waiting whom he will have to marry. The crowd waits anxiously for his decision, when he sees the princess among the spectators pointing him to the door on the right. The man starts to open the door—and the story abruptly ends. Did the princess save her love by pointing to the door leading to the lady-in-waiting, or did she prefer to see her lover die rather than see him marry someone else? That quandary has made the story a staple in English classes in American schools, especially since Stockton was careful never to hint at what he thought the ending would be. He also wrote a sequel to the story called "The Discourager of Hesitancy".

Stockton's 1895 adventure novel The Adventures of Captain Horn was the third-best selling book in the United States in 1895. "The Bee Man of Orn" and several other tales were incorporated in The Bee Man of Orn (1887). Other stories included "The Griffin and the Minor Canon", "Old Pipes and The Dryad", "The Queen's Museum", "Christmas Before Last", "Prince Hassak's March", "The Battle of the Third Cousins", "The Banished King", and "Philopena".

== Gallery ==
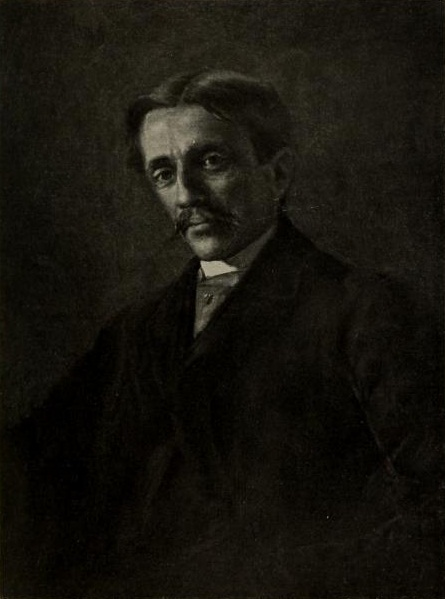
Stockton, by Dora Wheeler Keith, 1897

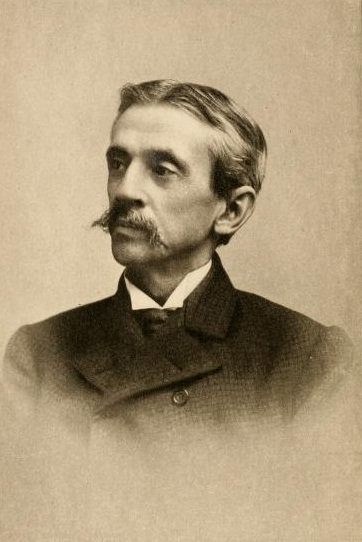

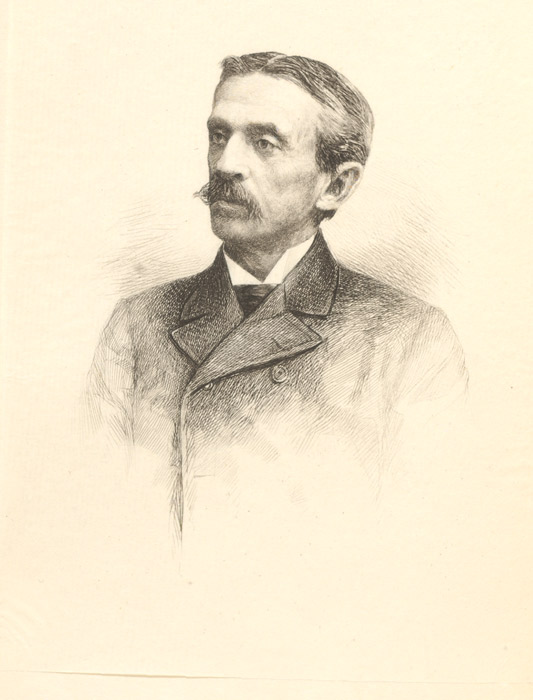
Stockton, by Charles Parker

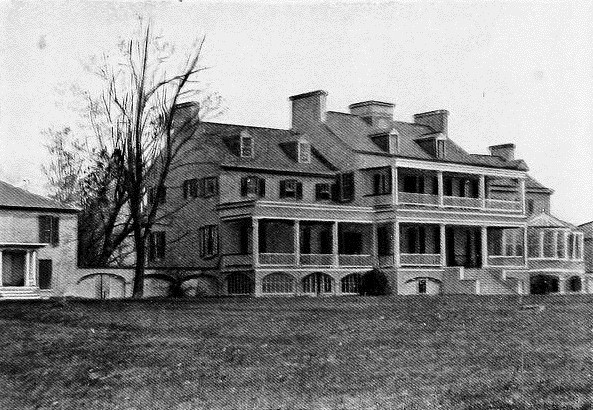
Claymont Court, Stockton's home near Charles Town, West Virginia

== Works ==
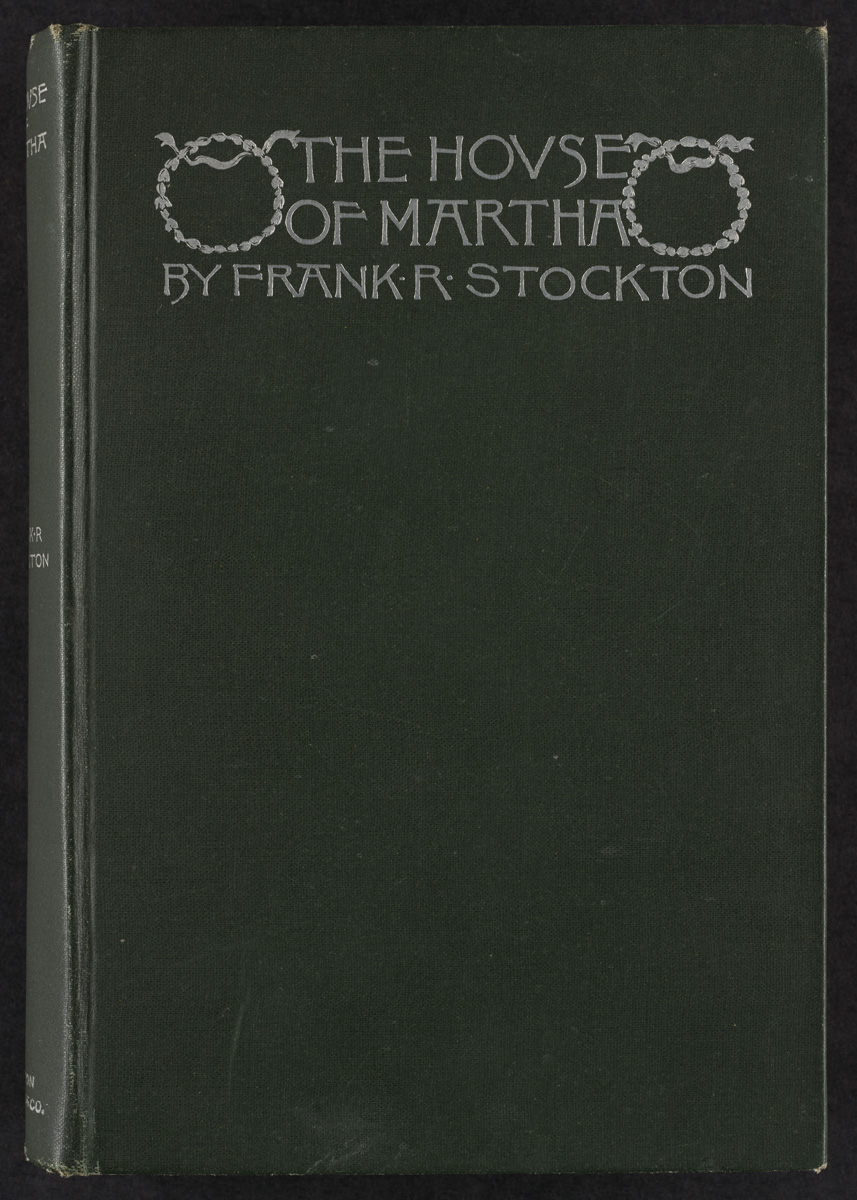
The House of Martha, 1891

- Rudder Grange, originally serialized in Scribner's Monthly
- The Lady or the Tiger? and Other Stories, David Douglas, 1884
- The Story of Viteau,1884
- The Hundredth Man, The Century Co., 1886.
- The Casting Away of Mrs. Lecks and Mrs. Aleshine, The Century Co.,1886
- The Bee-Man of Orn and Other Fanciful Tales, Charles Scribner's Sons, 1887
- The Dusantes, 1888
- The Great War Syndicate Dodd, Mead, and Company 1889
- The House of Martha, Houghton, Mifflin & Company, 1891
- The Adventures of Captain Horn, 1895
- Mrs. Cliff's Yacht, Charles Scribner's Sons, 1896
- The Vizier of the Two-Horned Alexander, The Century Co., 1899
- A Bicycle of Cathay, Harper and Brothers, 1900
- Kate Bonnet: The Romance of a Pirate's Daughter, D. Appleton & Company, 1901
- The Captain's Toll-Gate, D. Appleton & Company, 1903
- The Magic Egg and Other Stories, Charles Scribner's Sons, 1908
- The Squirrel Inn, The Century Company,1891
- The Lost Dryad, United Workers of Greenwich, 1912
- The Novels and Stories, 23 Vol., Charles Scribner's Sons, 1899–1904
- Fairy Tales of Frank Stockton, Penguin Books, 1990 (Edited and with a critical afterword by Jack Zipes). ISBN 0-451-52479-9.
