= Fishers Island, New York =

- Census-designated place
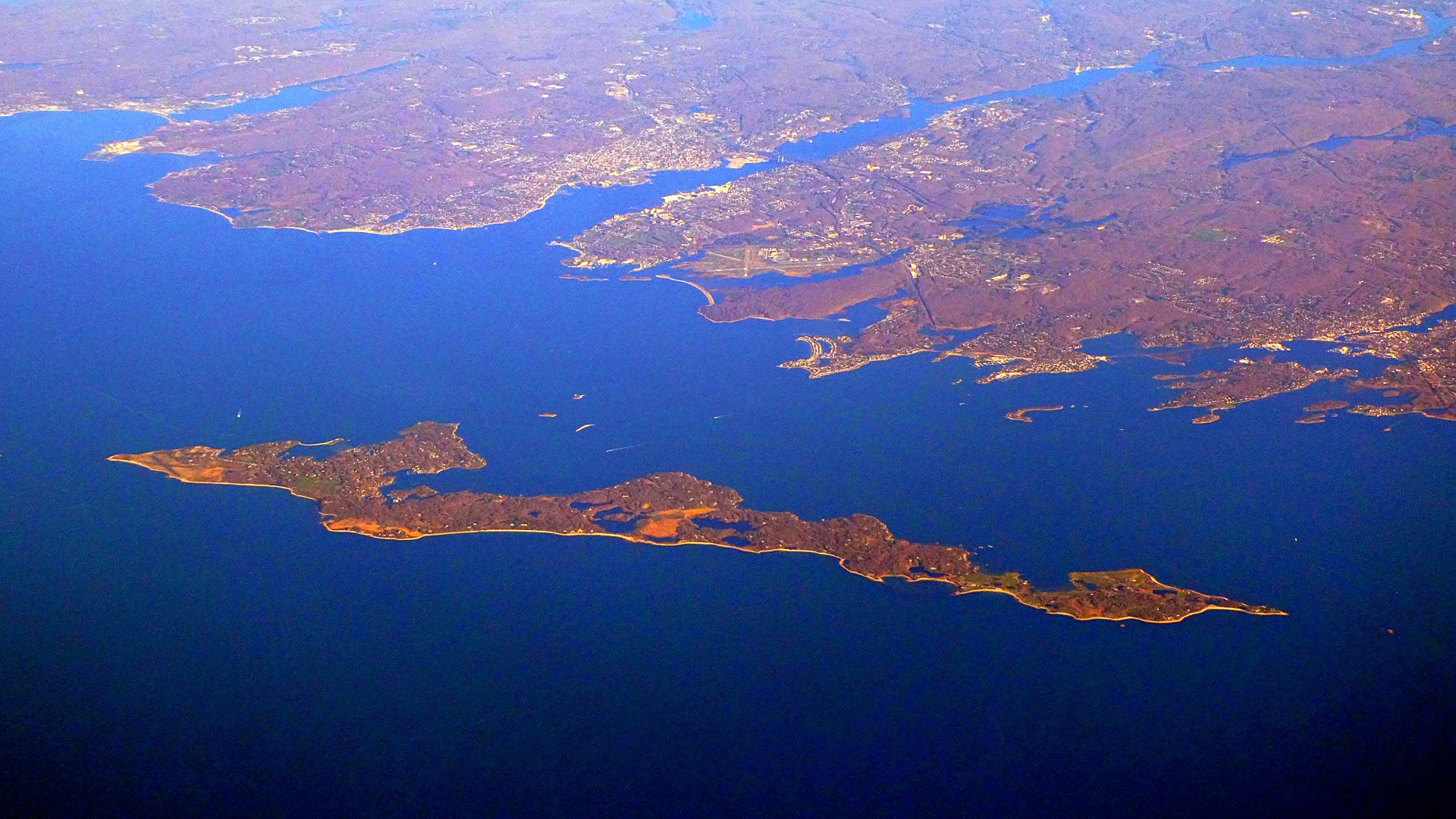
- Fishers Island, with the coast of Groton, Connecticut in the background

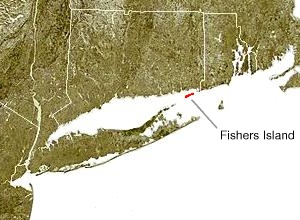

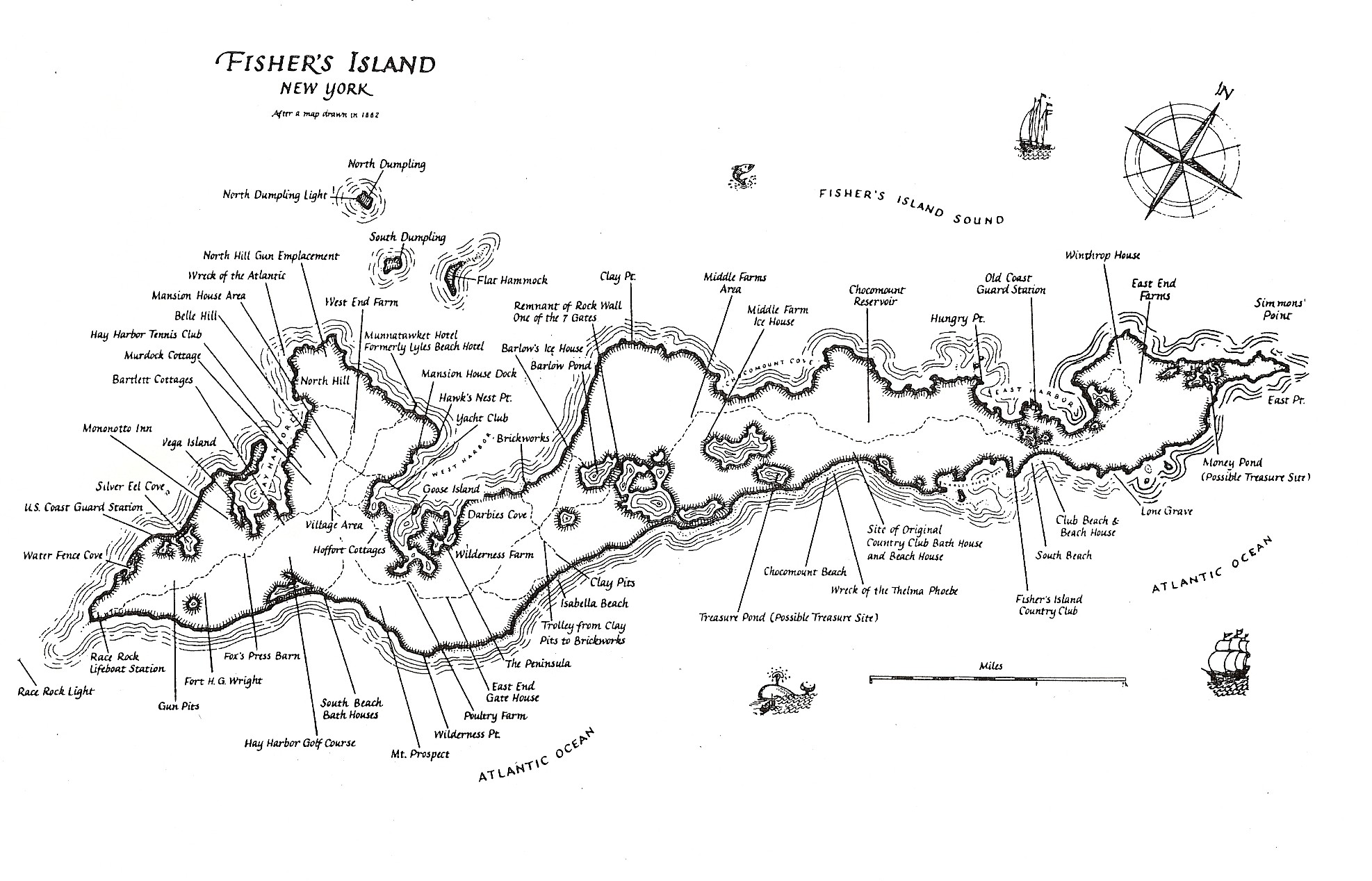
- Coordinates: 41°15′43″N 72°0′26″W
- Country: United States
- State: New York
- County: Suffolk
- Town: Southold

Area
  - Total: 4.97 sq mi (12.86 km^{2})
  - Land: 4.05 sq mi (10.50 km^{2})
  - Water: 0.91 sq mi (2.36 km^{2})
- Elevation: 16 ft (4.9 m)

Population (2020)
  - Total: 424
  - Density: 104.5/sq mi (40.36/km^{2})
- Time zone: UTC−5 (Eastern (EST))
  - Summer (DST): UTC−4 (EDT)
- ZIP Code: 06390 (originally 11943)
- Area codes: 631, 934
- FIPS code: 36-25923
- GNIS feature ID: 950166 (populated place); 950165 (island)

Fishers Island is an island within the town of Southold in Suffolk County, New York, United States. It lies at the eastern end of Long Island Sound, two miles (3 km) off the southeastern coast of Connecticut, across Fishers Island Sound. The census-designated place (CDP) of Fishers Island is coterminous with the island.

Having a length of approximately nine miles (14 km) and a width of one mile (1.6 km), the island is located roughly 11 miles (18 km) from the tip of Long Island at Orient Point; two miles (3 km) each from Napatree Point at the southwestern tip of Rhode Island and Groton Long Point in Connecticut; and about seven miles (11 km) southeast of New London, Connecticut. It is accessible from New London by plane and regular ferry service.

At the time of the 2020 census, Fishers Island had a population of 424. Seasonal residents bring the population to about 2,000 during peak summer months.

== History ==
The island was called Munnawtawkit by the Pequot Indians. Adriaen Block was the first recorded European visitor, who named it Vischer's Island in 1614 after one of his companions. It remained a wilderness for the next 25 years, visited occasionally by Dutch traders.

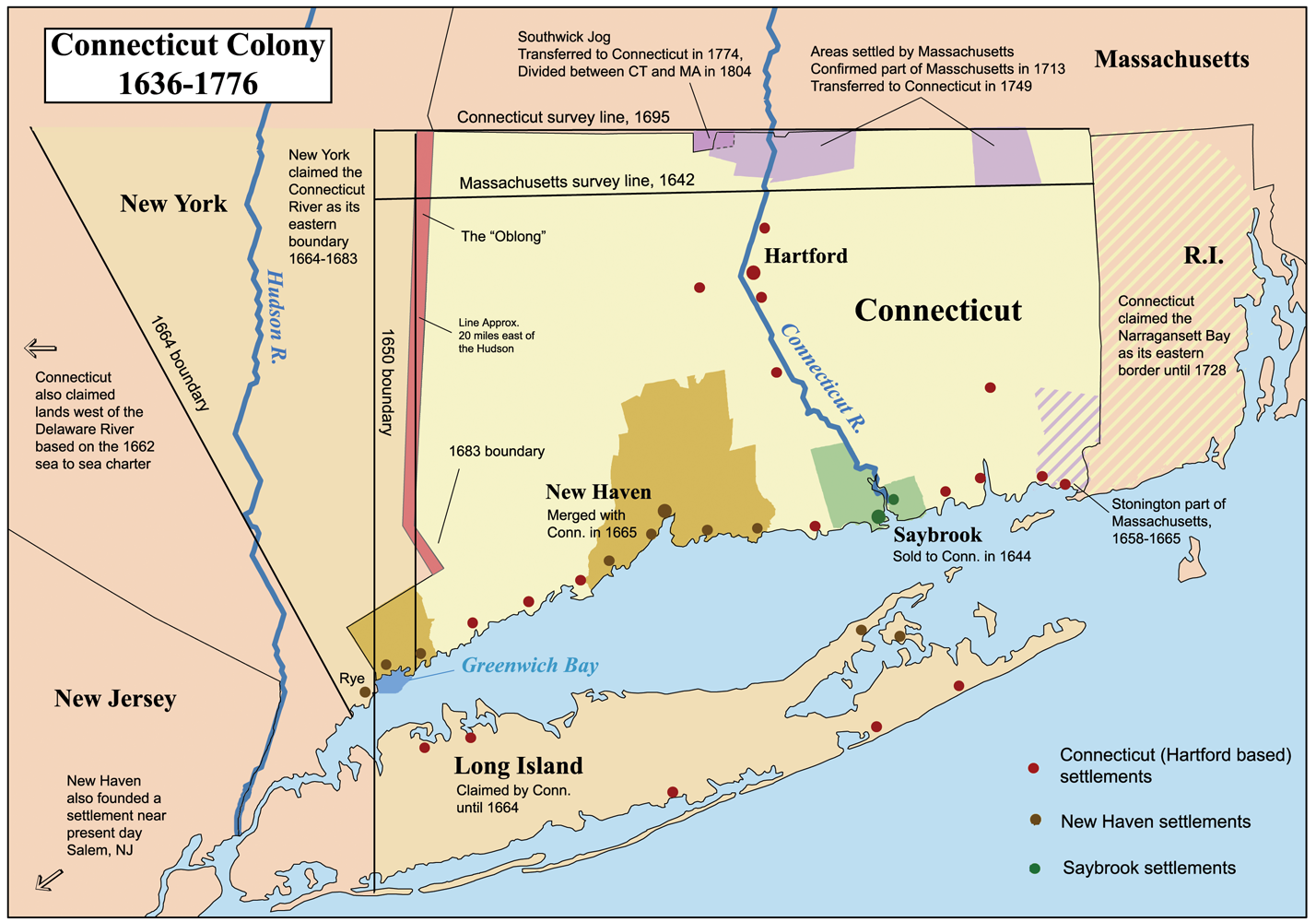
Map of the Connecticut, New Haven, and Saybrook colonies

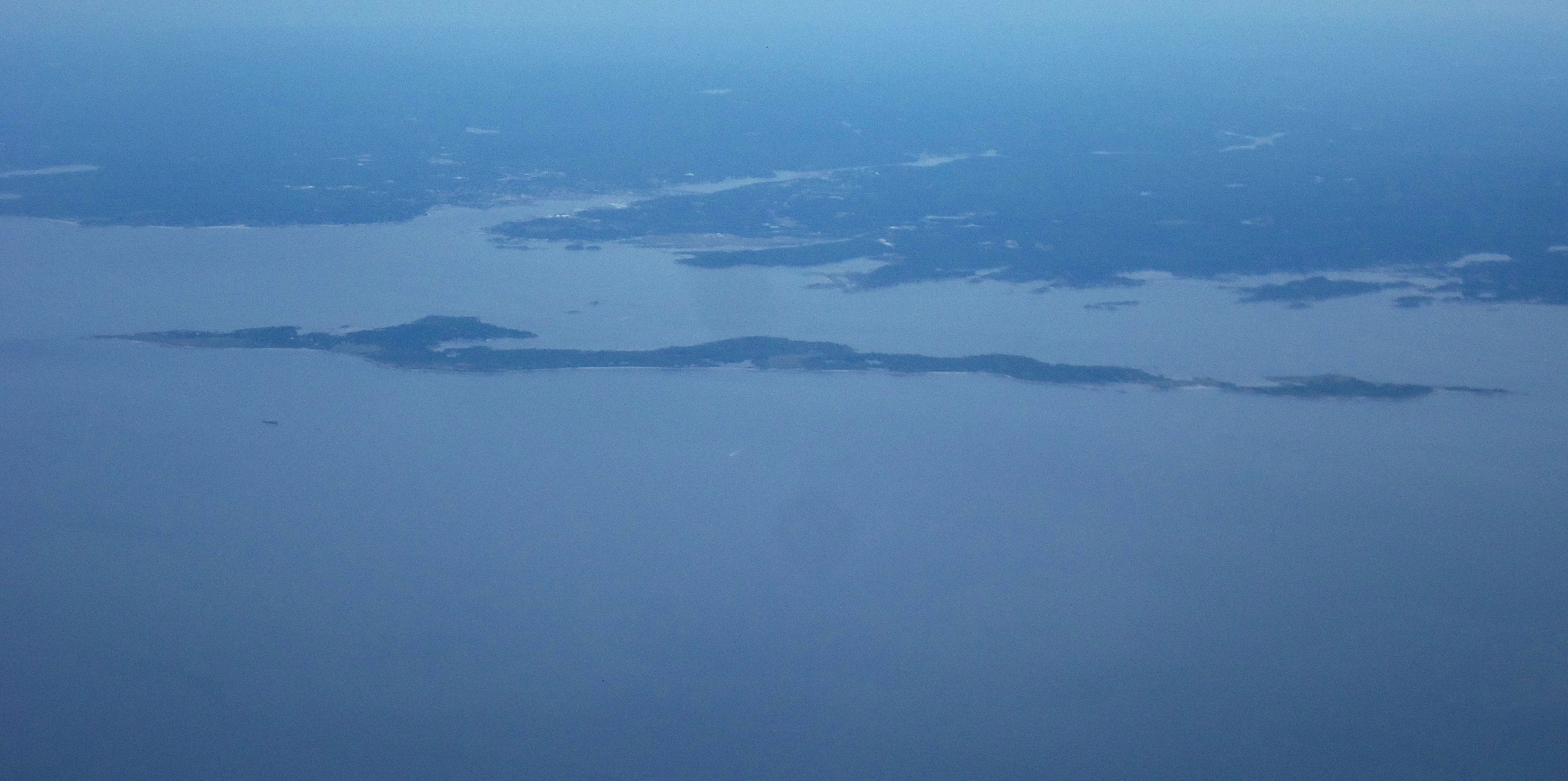
Fishers Island

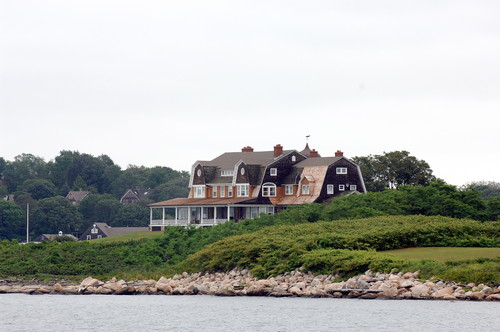
G. B. Linderman Mansion

John Winthrop the Younger obtained a grant of Fisher's Island in 1640 from the Massachusetts Bay Colony, "reserving the right of Connecticut if it should be decided to be theirs." He simultaneously applied to the Connecticut General Court for a similar grant in order that there might be no flaw in his title. The title was given to him by a General Court held at Hartford, Connecticut, April 9, 1641:

Upon Mr. Winthrop's motion to the court for Fisher's Island, it is the mind of the court that so far as it hinders not the public good of the country, either for fortifying for defense, or setting up a trade for fishing or salt and such like, he shall have liberty to proceed therein.

Winthrop lived only one winter on the island. He was named governor of the Connecticut Colony 1657–58 and 1659–76, and he used the island to raise sheep for food and wool. He died in 1676 and his son Fitz-John installed a lessee farmer from England on the island named William Walworth. Walworth brought a system of cultivation that was continued on the island for nearly 200 years. He established farmland on the heavily forested island. Walworth and his family vacated the island nine years later due to the threat of pirates. Fishers Island remained in the Winthrop family of Connecticut until 1863, when ownership passed to Robert R. Fox, and then to Edmund and Walton Ferguson, also of Connecticut.

The island was the subject of a border dispute between New York and Connecticut. The states of New York, Connecticut, and Rhode Island meet in the waters east of Fishers Island. The British took possession of New York City from the Dutch in 1664, and all of Suffolk County was claimed by Connecticut, with British settlers there accepting its jurisdiction. A 1664 land patent given to the Duke of York included all islands in Long Island Sound, apparently thus granting Fishers Island also to the Province of New York. The Duke of York held a grudge against Connecticut. The New Haven settlers had hidden three of the judges who sentenced his father King Charles I to death in 1649. Settlers throughout Suffolk County pressed to stay under Connecticut's jurisdiction, but Governor Sir Edmund Andros threatened to eliminate their rights to land if they did not yield, which they did by 1676. A joint commission from Connecticut and New York in 1879 reiterated that New York has legal title to Fishers Island.

The island was a target of British soldiers during the Revolutionary War, who raided islands in Long Island Sound for supplies. Many of the residents of Fishers Island took their herds to the relative safety of Connecticut in 1776. The raids continued, though, and the British burned many of the island's homes in 1779.

In 1783, brick-making was established as the island's only industry, using the vast amounts of available clay. This business was discontinued in 1889. In 1870, a lifesaving station was erected at the western end of the island by the State of Connecticut, which overlooked the waters between Fishers Island and Little Gull Island. The Race Rock Light was constructed in 1878 as a navigational aid for travel in the Race, located about 1 mile (1.6 km) west of Fishers Island. In the early 1900s, a permanent Coast Guard station was built on the west end. In 1898, the Fergusons sold 216 acres (0.9 km^{2}) on the western end to the federal government. This land was developed as Fort H.G. Wright, which was named after the Civil War Union commander who was born in Clinton, Connecticut. The fort was established as part of the Endicott Program, a large coastal defense project. It was largely abandoned following World War II. Over the years, Fort Wright drew a large number of residents to the island. The 1890s brought a growing summer population and the construction of the Fishers Island Yacht Club.

The E.W. & W. Ferguson business was established to manage the Mansion House Hotel and Cottages, a ferry service, and the electricity, water, and telephone enterprises. It was renamed Fishers Island Farms in 1918, then the Fishers Island Utility Company in 1965, following the death of a company president. As of 2022, the firm still owns and operates the water, telephone service (area code 631, exchange 788), and electrical utilities. The ferry is operated by the Fishers Island Ferry District, a public entity financed through a special tax district. The town has contracts with the Ferry District to operate Elizabeth Field airport and to manage other structures that were part of Fort Wright.

Hurricanes have played an important role in the island's history, with the Great September Gale of 1815 and the New England Hurricane of 1938 causing widespread damage. The 1815 storm destroyed nearly all of the trees with powerful winds and a 17-foot (5.2 m) storm surge that flooded coastal towns. The consequences for Fishers Island were visible for almost a century and a half. A 1910 panoramic photograph shows more boats in Hay and West harbors than there are mature trees. Until the 1950s, Fishers Island had the look of Ireland: stone walls, few trees, and windswept moors.

The 1938 storm blew in seeds, returning Fishers to its pre-1815 foliage. The damage from this storm was less severe than the 1815 storm, with only a few island residences destroyed, primarily by wind.

== Geography ==
According to the United States Census Bureau, the CDP has a total area of 4.2 square miles (10.9 km^{2}), of which 4.1 square miles (10.6 km^{2}) is land and 0.15 square miles (0.4 km^{2}), or 3.48%, is water.

Fishers Island represents a section of the same terminal moraine that formed the North Fork of Long Island, which comes ashore at Watch Hill, Rhode Island. During the late phase of the Wisconsin glaciation, glacial Lake Connecticut formed at the retreating fore edge of the ice sheet, over what is now Long Island Sound; it formed an outlet in its moraine dam at The Race, famous for rip currents, which still separates Fishers Island from the North Fork. Fishers Island is essentially a long barrow of rocky till scoured from the surface of southern Connecticut.

=== Climate ===
Fishers Island's weather is influenced by the proximity of the Long Island Sound and the Atlantic Ocean – as well as prevailing winds that generally blow offshore. The climate is one of only a few locations on the east coast in the Northern Hemisphere that is oceanic (Köppen Cfb). Because the ocean stays warm during the fall and winter months, Fishers Island stays warmer than the mainland (Connecticut) during this time. Although summer days can be hot on Fishers Island, because of its oceanic climate, temperatures are lower than on the mainland in nearby Connecticut and Rhode Island. For example, the July and August, average daytime temperature on the island usually ranges in the mid- to upper 70s while they averages in the low to mid-80s in nearby areas of New England.

== Demographics ==
Historical population
Census	Pop.	Note	%±
2000	289		—
2010	236		−18.3%
2020	424		79.7%
U.S. Decennial Census

As of the census of 2000, there were 289 people, 138 households, and 77 families residing in the CDP. The population density was 71.3 inhabitants per square mile (27.5/km^{2}). There were 625 housing units at an average density of 154.2 per square mile (59.5/km^{2}). The racial makeup of the community was 95.50% White, 1.04% African American, 1.04% Asian, and 2.42% from two or more races. Hispanic or Latino of any race were 1.38% of the population.

There are 554 homes on Fishers Island, approximately 80% of which are seasonal residences.

There were 138 households, out of which 26.1% had children under the age of 18 living with them, 44.2% were married couples living together, 5.1% had a female householder with no husband present, and 43.5% were non-families. 34.8% of all households were made up of individuals, and 10.1% had someone living alone who was 65 years of age or older. The average household size was 2.09 and the average family size was 2.72.

In the CDP, the population was spread out, with 21.8% under the age of 18, 2.1% from 18 to 24, 30.8% from 25 to 44, 27.3% from 45 to 64, and 18.0% who were 65 years of age or older. The median age was 43 years. For every 100 females, there were 105.0 males. For every 100 females age 18 and over, there were 98.2 males.

The median income for a household in the community was $50,521, and the median income for a family was $59,583. Males had a median income of $47,917 versus $26,250 for females. The per capita income for the CDP was $31,652. About 4.5% of families and 9.0% of the population were below the poverty line, including 9.8% of those under the age of eighteen and 7.9% of those 65 or over.

== Arts and culture ==
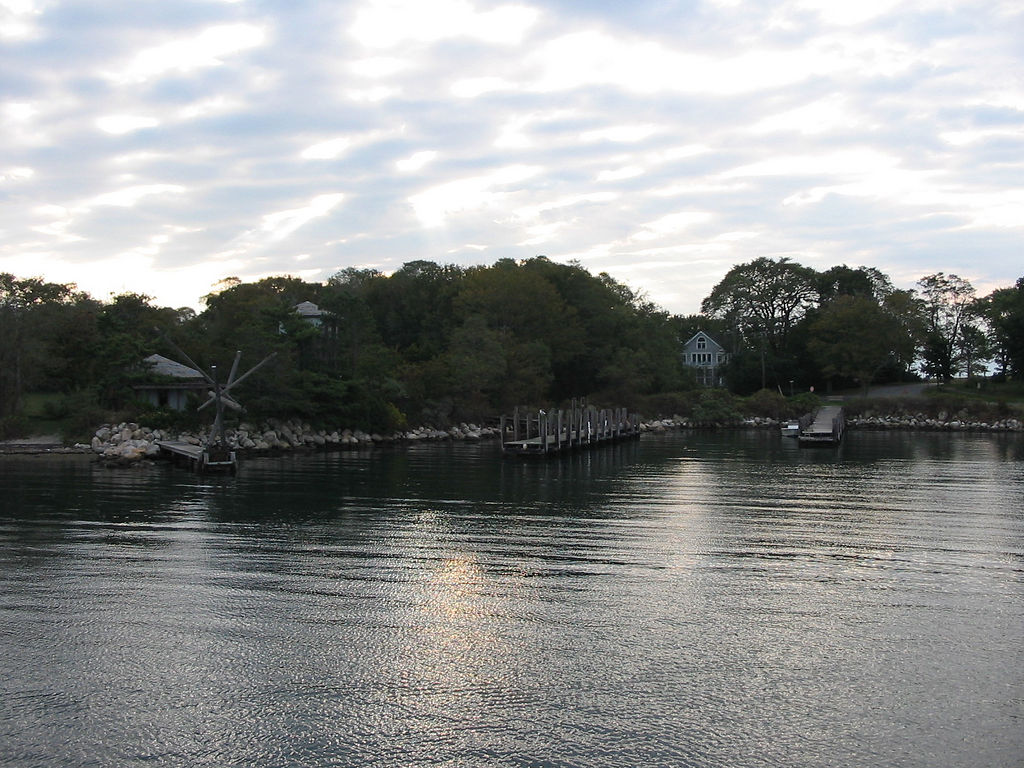
Docks at Fishers Island

The island has closer links with Connecticut – two miles (3 km) to its north – than with the rest of New York, located ten miles (16 km) to the southwest.

Tom Clavin of The New York Times wrote that "the connection remains merely political, not emotional" to New York State, and that "in appearance, accent, location, and sensibility, this is a decidedly New England community".

Fishers Island's ZIP code is 06390, corresponding to Connecticut ZIP codes that begin with "06", while other residential ZIP codes in New York State begin with "1". Originally, the ZIP Code for the island was 11943, but it was ultimately changed to allow for easier mail delivery, since it is closer to Connecticut than the rest of Long Island.

The island is the only point in Suffolk County to which telephone calls placed from the New York City area are classified as long distance rather than regional; any telephone call placed from Fishers Island to anywhere else is treated as long distance.

The only way for New York state troopers to get to Fishers Island is to travel through Connecticut and take the ferry from New London.

Every athletic team at Fishers Island School plays against Connecticut teams; none of the teams from the school played against any New York team in 2011–2012. Trash from the island is sent to Wallingford, Connecticut. Residents also closely adhere to Connecticut's state laws regarding recycling.

Since the turn of the 20th century, "old-money" families have selected the island for their summer vacations, such as the Rockefeller family, Du Pont family, Whitney family, and Roosevelt family. Their luxurious dwellings reflect an emphasis on continuity and tradition. In 1965, Cleveland Amory described it as "the last resort of the big rich, and they want it kept that way.".

Most of the year-round residents live on the western end of the island. The island offers all the necessities for small-town life, including a K-12 school (Fishers Island School), bowling alley, movie theater, liquor store, grocery store, two gas stations, volunteer fire department, and post office. The west end also has a small air strip (Elizabeth Field), a museum, an ice cream shop, two boutiques, a hardware store, and a restaurant-bar. The island is also home to the Fishers Island Oyster Farm, a family-owned and managed oyster farm that sells oysters directly to customers and chefs, including Manhattan restaurants such as Balthazar and PJ Clarke's.

== Parks and recreation ==
Beaches include South Beach, Isabella Beach, Chocomount Beach, and Dock Beach, located at West Harbor.

Fishers Island Club features tennis courts, a beachfront, clubhouse, employee housing, and a golf course which President Dwight D. Eisenhower called a "real course".

Hay Harbor is a club featuring golf, tennis, swimming and sailing.

Fishers Island Yacht Club holds races in the summer, and maintains two racing fleets.

== Government ==
In 2004, two officials in the Southold government were from Fishers Island. Clavin said Fishers Island residents felt this was inadequate and that the removal of a Fishers Island resident from the Southold zoning board of appeals led to calls for secession from New York and incorporation into Connecticut.

== Education ==
Fishers Island Union Free School District is located at 19 Greenwood Road and consists of one school that serves 68 students in grades PK through 12. In 2014, the district spent $36,811 per pupil. The district spends 71% on instruction, and 29% on support services. The district's student-teacher ratio is five students for every full-time equivalent teacher.

== Media ==
The seaside scenes in the movie The World According to Garp were shot on Fishers Island around the grounds of the mansion built by Bethlehem Steel heir Robert Linderman. Many other movies have also been filmed there.

== See also ==
- Shelter Island, New York
- List of islands of New York (state)
