= Art competitions at the 1948 Summer Olympics =

Art competitions at the Games of the XIV Olympiad
- Art competitions pictogram
- Venue: Victoria and Albert Museum
- Dates: 15 July – 14 August 1948
- No. of events: 14

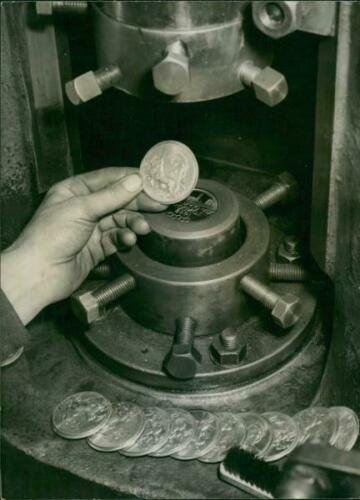
1948 London Olympic medals being minted at the works of John Pinches in Clapham

Art competitions were held as part of the 1948 Summer Olympics in London, Great Britain. Medals were awarded in five categories (architecture, literature, music, painting, and sculpture), for works inspired by sport-related themes. These were the first Olympic Games following the devastation of World War II, and tensions between nations remained high, with much debate about the inclusion of Germany, Italy, and Japan.

The art exhibition was held at the Victoria and Albert Museum from 15 July to 14 August, and displayed works of art from 27 countries. The literature competition attracted 44 entries, and the music competition had 36 entries.

The art competitions included multiple subcategories for each of the five artistic categories. The judges declined to award any medals for dramatic works in literature, and no gold medals in another five subcategories. Alex Diggelmann of Switzerland won both a silver medal and a bronze medal for two different entries in the applied arts and crafts subcategory, a feat unlikely to be duplicated in any event in the current Olympic program.

These were the last Games in which art competitions were held, after being in the official program for all Games since 1912. At a meeting of the International Olympic Committee in 1949 it was decided to hold art exhibitions instead, as it was judged inappropriate to permit professionals to compete in the art competitions while only amateurs were permitted to compete in sporting events. Since 1952 a non-competitive art and cultural festival has been associated with each Games.

== Architecture ==
Category	Gold	Silver	Bronze
Architectural design	Adolf Hoch (AUT) "Skisprungschanze auf dem Kobenzl"	Alfred Rinesch (AUT) "Watersports Centre in Carinthia"	Nils Olsson (SWE) "Baths and Sporting Hall for Gothenburg"
Town planning	Yrjö Lindegren (FIN) "The Centre of Athletics in Varkaus, Finland"	Werner Schindler and Edy Knupfer (SUI) "Swiss Federal Sports and Gymnastics Training Centre"	Ilmari Niemeläinen (FIN) "The Athletic Centre in Kemi, Finland"

== Literature ==
Category	Gold	Silver	Bronze
Lyric works	Aale Tynni (FIN) "Laurel of Hellas"	Ernst van Heerden (RSA) "Six Poems"	Gilbert Prouteau (FRA) "Rythme du Stade"
Dramatic works	none awarded	none awarded	none awarded
Epic works	Giani Stuparich (ITA) "La Grotta"	Josef Petersen (DEN) "The Olympic Champion"	Éva Földes (HUN) "The Well of Youth"

== Music ==
Category	Gold	Silver	Bronze
Vocal	none awarded	none awarded	Gabriele Bianchi (ITA) "Inno Olimpionico"
Instrumental and chamber	none awarded	John Weinzweig (CAN) "Divertimenti for Solo Flute and Strings"	Sergio Lauricella (ITA) "Toccata per Pianoforte"
Compositions for Orchestra	Zbigniew Turski (POL) "Olympic Symphony"	Kalervo Tuukkanen (FIN) "Karhunpyynti"	Erling Brene (DEN) "Vigeur"

== Painting and graphic art ==
Category	Gold	Silver	Bronze
Oils and water colours	Alfred Thomson (GBR) "London Amateur Championships"	Giovanni Stradone (ITA) "Le Pistard"	Letitia Hamilton (IRL) "Meath Hunt Point-to-Point Races"
Engravings and etchings	Albert Decaris (FRA) "Swimming Pool"	John Copley (GBR) "Polo Players"	Walter Battiss (RSA) "Seaside Sport"
Applied arts and crafts	none awarded	Alex Diggelmann (SUI) "World Championship for Cycling Poster"	Alex Diggelmann (SUI) "World Championship for Ice Hockey Poster"

== Sculpture ==
Category	Gold	Silver	Bronze
Statues	Gustaf Nordahl (SWE) "Homage to Ling"	Chintamoni Kar (GBR) "The Stag"	Hubert Yencesse (FRA) "Nageuse"
Reliefs	none awarded	none awarded	Rosamund Fletcher (GBR) "The End of the Covert"
Medals and plaques	none awarded	Oskar Thiede (AUT) "Eight Sports Plaques"	Edwin Grienauer (AUT) "Prize Rowing Trophy"

== Medal table ==
At the time, medals were awarded to these artists, but art competitions are no longer regarded as official Olympic events by the International Olympic Committee. These events do not appear in the IOC medal database, and these totals are not included in the IOC's medal table for the 1948 Games.

Rank	Nation	Gold	Silver	Bronze	Total
1	Finland (FIN)	2	1	1	4
2	Austria (AUT)	1	2	1	4
2	Great Britain (GBR)	1	2	1	4
4	Italy (ITA)	1	1	2	4
5	France (FRA)	1	0	2	3
6	Sweden (SWE)	1	0	1	2
7	Poland (POL)	1	0	0	1
8	Switzerland (SUI)	0	2	1	3
9	Denmark (DEN)	0	1	1	2
9	South Africa (RSA)	0	1	1	2
11	Canada (CAN)	0	1	0	1
12	Hungary (HUN)	0	0	1	1
12	Ireland (IRL)	0	0	1	1
Totals (13 entries)		8	11	13	32

== Events summary ==
=== Architecture ===
Designs for Town Planning

The following architects took part:

Rank	Name	Country
1	Yrjö Lindegren	Finland
2	Edy Knupfer, Werner Schindler	Switzerland
3	Ilmari Niemeläinen	Finland
AC	Jack Néel, Pierre Vago	France

Architectural designs

The following architects took part:

Rank	Name	Country
1	Adolf Hoch	Austria
2	Alfred Rinesch	Austria
3	Nils Olsson	Sweden
AC	Dagoberto Ortensi	Italy
AC	Dragan Boltar	Yugoslavia
AC	Franjo Neidhardt	Yugoslavia
AC	Vladimir Turina	Yugoslavia
AC	František Marek	Czechoslovakia
AC	Patrick Horsbrugh	Great Britain
AC	Örjan Lüning	Sweden
AC	Ferdinand Marani	Canada
AC	Robert Morris	Canada

Further entries

The following architects took part:

Rank	Name	Country
AC	Charles Terry Pledge	Great Britain
AC	Wilhelm Andreas Herdey	Austria
AC	Lorle Herdey-von Savageri	Austria
AC	Alexander Scott	Great Britain
AC	A. Tarık Eğrilmez	Turkey
AC	Renato Giovanelli	Italy
AC	Dagoberto Ortensi	Italy
AC	Thurston Williams	Great Britain
AC	Maxwell Ayrton	Great Britain
AC	Hans Janssen	Netherlands
AC	Walter van der Valk	Netherlands
AC	Eskil Lundahl	Sweden
AC	Sture Frölén	Sweden

Rank	Name	Country
AC	Jan Wils	Netherlands
AC	Hans Asplund	Sweden
AC	Berkeley Moir	Great Britain
AC	Patroklos Karantinos	Greece
AC	Karel Kuthan	Czechoslovakia
AC	Sjoerd Joustra	Netherlands
AC	Predrag Kovačević	Yugoslavia
AC	Harold Kaplan	Canada
AC	Abraham Sprachman	Canada
AC	Vlastibor Klimeš	Czechoslovakia
AC	Ferdinand Balcárek	Czechoslovakia
AC	Mario Ghedina	Italy
AC	Konstantinos Aslanidis	Greece

Rank	Name	Country
AC	Guy Ardilouze	France
AC	Jean Démaret	France
AC	Othello Zavaroni	France
AC	Carlo Di Maria	Italy
AC	Alfred Ferraz	France
AC	Lucien Seignol	France
AC	Georges Tourry	France
AC	Auguste Perret	France
AC	Guy Sabrou	France
AC	Siegfried Theiß	Austria
AC	Hans Jaksch	Austria
AC	Dermot O'Toole	Ireland

=== Literature ===
Dramatic works

The following writers took part:

Rank	Name	Country
AC	Clotilde Luisi	Uruguay
AC	José María Podestá	Uruguay
AC	Benoît Bickel	Switzerland

Epic works

The following writers took part:

Rank	Name	Country
1	Giani Stùparich	Italy
2	Josef Petersen	Denmark
3	Éva Földes	Hungary
AC	Hans Breidbach-Bernau	Austria
AC	Stanislaus Lynch	Ireland
AC	Giorgio Caproni	Italy
AC	Max Ehinger	Switzerland
AC	Miklós Jós	Hungary
AC	Philip Greene	Ireland
AC	Philip Rooney	Ireland
AC	Juuse Tamminen	Finland
AC	Joel Laikka	Finland

Lyric works

The following writers took part:

Rank	Name	Country
1	Aale Tynni	Finland
2	Ernst Van Heerden	South Africa
3	Gilbert Prouteau	France
AC	Heikki Asunta	Finland
AC	Eleuter Iwaszkiewicz	Poland
AC	Walter Roberts	Great Britain
AC	Giorgio Caproni	Italy
AC	Michele Caballo Galleano	Italy
AC	Benoît Bickel	Switzerland
AC	Ferdinand Schell	Switzerland
AC	René Borchanne	Switzerland
AC	Stanislaus Lynch	Ireland
AC	Flora Vere O'Brien	Ireland

Unknown event

The following writers took part:

Rank	Name	Country
AC	Geraldine Wright	Canada
AC	Doris Hedges	Canada
AC	Gérard Bessette	Canada
AC	François Hertel	Canada

=== Music ===
Compositions for orchestra

The following composers took part:

Rank	Name	Country
1	Zbigniew Turski	Poland
2	Kalervo Tuukkanen	Finland
3	Erling Brene	Denmark
AC	Grażyna Bacewicz	Poland
AC	Einar Englund	Finland
AC	Jan Kapr	Czechoslovakia
AC	Maurice Thiriet	France
AC	Stanisław Wiechowicz	Poland
AC	Yves Baudrier	France
AC	Werner Gallusser	Switzerland
AC	Jean Daetwyler	Switzerland
AC	Clermont Pépin	Canada
AC	Alexander Brott	Canada
AC	Oskar Morawetz	Canada
AC	Aarre Merikanto	Finland

Instrumental and chamber

The following composers took part:

Rank	Name	Country
1	Not awarded	
2	John Weinzweig	Canada
3	Sergio Lauricella	Italy
AC	Jean Coulthard Adams	Canada
AC	Mario Panunzi	Italy
AC	Harry Somers	Canada
AC	James C. Flynn	Ireland

Vocals

The following composers took part:

Rank	Name	Country
1	Not awarded	
2	Not awarded	
3	Gabriele Bianchi	Italy
AC	Ina Boyle	Ireland
AC	Barbara Pentland	Canada
AC	Harry Somers	Canada
AC	John Weinzweig	Canada
AC	Gerard Victory	Ireland
AC	Jan Zdeněk Bartoš	Czechoslovakia

Unknown event

The following composers took part:

Rank	Name	Country
AC	Václav Dobiáš	Czechoslovakia
AC	Josef Kouba	Czechoslovakia

=== Painting ===
Graphic arts

The following painters took part:

Rank	Name	Country
1	Albert Decaris	France
2	John Copley	Great Britain
3	Walter Battiss	South Africa
AC	Laura Knight	Great Britain
AC	Adam Marczyński	Poland
AC	Gino De Finetti	Italy
AC	Chen Hsiao-nan	Republic of China
AC	John Skeaping	Great Britain
AC	Gwen Raverat	Great Britain
AC	Lilla Hellesen	Norway
AC	Andrzej Jurkiewicz	Poland
AC	Delmar Banner	Great Britain
AC	André Dunoyer de Segonzac	France
AC	Flora Vere O'Brien	Ireland
AC	Hans Erni	Switzerland
AC	Heinrich Krause	Austria
AC	James Bostock	Great Britain
AC	John Buckland-Wright	Great Britain
AC	Livinius van de Bundt	Netherlands
AC	Luc Albert Moreau	France
AC	William Washington	Great Britain
AC	Winifred Austen	Great Britain
AC	Luigi Bartolini	Italy
AC	Frederick Austin	Great Britain
AC	Anthony Gross	Great Britain

Paintings

The following painters took part:

Rank	Name	Country
1	Alfred Thomson	Great Britain
2	Giovanni Stradone	Italy
3	Letitia Hamilton	Ireland
AC	Thies Luijt	Netherlands
AC	Aimé Thevenet	France
AC	Cosmo Clark	Great Britain
AC	Fritz Brandtner	Canada
AC	Lucien Fontanarosa	France
AC	Walter Battiss	South Africa
AC	Giuseppe Riccobaldi del Bava	Italy
AC	Mimma Riccobaldi del Bava	Italy
AC	A. G. Chagale	India
AC	Alfred Gerstenbrand	Austria
AC	Anthony Gross	Great Britain
AC	Bettina Somers	Canada
AC	Chang Chien-ying	Republic of China

Rank	Name	Country
AC	Corrado Mancioli	Italy
AC	Delmar Banner	Great Britain
AC	Hernando Ocampo	Philippines
AC	Howard Jarvis	Great Britain
AC	Jan Goedhart	Netherlands
AC	John Platt	Great Britain
AC	K. S. Kulkarni	India
AC	Karl-Maria May	Austria
AC	Lionel Edwards	Great Britain
AC	Lotti Lobsiger-Schibli	Switzerland
AC	Mino Maccari	Italy
AC	Robert Lips	Switzerland
AC	Roy Beddington	Great Britain
AC	Russell Reeve	Great Britain
AC	John Sanderson-Wells	Great Britain

Rank	Name	Country
AC	Sun Zongwei	Republic of China
AC	Cheng Wu-fei	Republic of China
AC	Alfred Egerton Cooper	Great Britain
AC	Paul Maze	Great Britain
AC	Karl Borschke	Austria
AC	Laura Knight	Great Britain
AC	John Copley	Great Britain
AC	John Skeaping	Great Britain
AC	Anna Zinkeisen	Great Britain
AC	Gino De Finetti	Italy
AC	Clifford Hall	Great Britain
AC	Vera Matthews-Irving	Canada
AC	Maurice MacGonigal	Ireland
AC	Ciaran Clear	Ireland
AC	Thomas Healy	Ireland

Unknown event

The following painters took part:

Rank	Name	Country
AC	Adrienne Jouclard	France
AC	Anna Zinkeisen	Great Britain
AC	Deirdre Henty-Creer	Great Britain
AC	Doris Zinkeisen	Great Britain
AC	Ethel Gabain	Great Britain
AC	Heather Child	Great Britain
AC	Paula Maly	Austria
AC	Vera Brookman	Great Britain
AC	Louis De Marquevic	France
AC	Alfred Egerton Cooper	Great Britain
AC	Alec Pecker	Great Britain
AC	Alfred Munnings	Great Britain
AC	Allan Walton	Great Britain
AC	Kees Andrea	Netherlands
AC	Angelo Savelli	Italy
AC	Ásgeir Bjarnþórsson	Iceland
AC	Charles Cundall	Great Britain
AC	Charles Lamb	Ireland
AC	Zhang Anzhi	Republic of China
AC	Christopher Campbell	Ireland
AC	Clifford Hall	Great Britain
AC	Kees Maks	Netherlands
AC	Dimitrios Kokotsis	Greece
AC	Daniel Vázquez	Spain
AC	Coralie de Burgh	Great Britain
AC	Dick Hart	Great Britain

Rank	Name	Country
AC	Domenico Purificato	Italy
AC	Eduard Matras	Austria
AC	Edith Marion Scales	Great Britain
AC	Ekke Ozlberger	Austria
AC	Elli Riehl	Austria
AC	Emil Kotrba	Czechoslovakia
AC	Felice Ludovisi	Italy
AC	Feliks Topolski	Great Britain
AC	Frederick Austin	Great Britain
AC	George Pilkington	South Africa
AC	Giuseppe Capogrossi	Italy
AC	Gijs Kramer	Netherlands
AC	Hans Erni	Switzerland
AC	Helen Sampson	Great Britain
AC	Henryk Tomaszewski	Poland
AC	Hervé Morvan	France
AC	Herbert Gurschner	Great Britain
AC	Jack Hanlon	Ireland
AC	Jacques Maloubier	France
AC	João Fragoso	Portugal
AC	John Farleigh	Great Britain
AC	John Wheatley	Great Britain
AC	Karl Borschke	Austria
AC	Klaus Pachnicke	Austria
AC	Luigi Bartolini	Italy
AC	Jerry Critchlow	Great Britain

Rank	Name	Country
AC	Mario Cortiello	Italy
AC	Max Frey	Austria
AC	Paul Daxhelet	Belgium
AC	Paul Maze	Great Britain
AC	Roy de Maistre	Great Britain
AC	Ray Howard-Jones	Great Britain
AC	Richard Murry	Great Britain
AC	Thomas Dugdale	Great Britain
AC	Victor Coverley-Price	Great Britain
AC	Vittorio Piscopo	Italy
AC	A. Wynne-Rogers	Great Britain
AC	Wilhelm Kaufmann	Austria
AC	William Fisher	Great Britain
AC	Denholm Armour	Great Britain
AC	Charles Simpson	Great Britain
AC	Laura Knight	Great Britain
AC	Howard Jarvis	Great Britain
AC	Frederic Whiting	Great Britain
AC	Cosmo Clark	Great Britain
AC	Letitia Hamilton	Ireland
AC	Norman Wilkinson	Great Britain
AC	William Nicholson	Great Britain
AC	Alex Walter Diggelmann	Switzerland
AC	Winifred Austen	Great Britain
AC	Ian James Scott	Great Britain

Applied arts

The following painters took part:

Rank	Name	Country
1	Not awarded	
2	Alex Walter Diggelmann	Switzerland
3	Alex Walter Diggelmann	Switzerland
AC	Bernard Cuzner	Great Britain
AC	Stanley Morris	Great Britain
AC	Cecily Briant	Great Britain
AC	Gertrude Bohnert	Switzerland
AC	Jacques Maloubier	France
AC	Gertrude Poilschek	Austria
AC	Helena Stuliková	Czechoslovakia
AC	Josephine Cheesman	Great Britain
AC	Joyce Himsworth	Great Britain

Rank	Name	Country
AC	Phyllis Platt	Great Britain
AC	Alf von Chmielowski	Austria
AC	Alois Mitschek	Austria
AC	Cyril Shiner	Great Britain
AC	Edgard Derouet	France
AC	Paul Fromentier	France
AC	Freda Hands	Great Britain
AC	Geoffrey Holden	Great Britain
AC	H. E. Twaits	Great Britain
AC	Ian James Scott	Great Britain
AC	John Auld	Great Britain

Rank	Name	Country
AC	Jerzy Jarnuszkiewicz	Poland
AC	Johann Horvath	Austria
AC	Rudolf Terhes	Austria
AC	Lucien Bernier	Canada
AC	Mans Meijer	Netherlands
AC	Paul Colin	France
AC	Peter Stebbing	Great Britain
AC	Ralph Lavers	Great Britain
AC	Reginald Till	Great Britain
AC	William Wilson	Great Britain
AC	Yvon Lalande	Canada

=== Sculpture ===
Medals and plaques

The following sculptors took part:

Rank	Name	Country
1	Not awarded	
2	Oskar Thiede	Austria
3	Edwin Grienauer	Austria
AC	Alex Walter Diggelmann	Switzerland
AC	Filippo Sgarlata	Italy
AC	Stanislav Binar	Czechoslovakia
AC	Alessandro Manzo	Italy
AC	Omero Taddeini	Italy
AC	Thomas Wilkinson	Great Britain

Reliefs

The following sculptors took part:

Rank	Name	Country
1	Not awarded	
2	Not awarded	
3	Rosamund Fletcher	Great Britain

Statues

The following sculptors took part:

Rank	Name	Country
1	Gustaf Nordahl	Sweden
2	Chintamoni Kar	Great Britain
3	Hubert Yencesse	France
AC	Emilio Greco	Italy
AC	Filippo Sgarlata	Italy
AC	Franciszek Strynkiewicz	Poland
AC	Jerzy Bandura	Poland
AC	Joseph Rivière	France
AC	Knud Nellemose	Denmark
AC	Margarete Markl	Austria
AC	Edwin Grienauer	Austria
AC	Edmund Reitter	Austria
AC	Karl Stemolak	Austria
AC	Guy Van Den Steen	Belgium
AC	Elsy Blom-Wirz	Belgium

Rank	Name	Country
AC	Odon Lallemand	Belgium
AC	Sybil Kennedy	Canada
AC	Robert Norgate	Canada
AC	Henri Lagriffoul	France
AC	Joël Martel	France
AC	Jan Martel	France
AC	Dora Gordine	Great Britain
AC	David Evans	Great Britain
AC	Mary Morton	Great Britain
AC	Phyllis Bone	Great Britain
AC	Eric Winters	Great Britain
AC	Desmond Broe	Ireland
AC	Edmondo Gigante	Ireland
AC	May Power	Ireland
AC	Filippo Tallone	Italy

Rank	Name	Country
AC	Angelo Di Castro	Italy
AC	Alessandro Manzo	Italy
AC	Co Derr	Netherlands
AC	Graciano Nepomuceno	Philippines
AC	Jacek Żuławski	Poland
AC	Jan Ślusarczyk	Poland
AC	Maria Bujakowa	Poland
AC	Helena Bukowska-Szlekys	Poland
AC	Hans Brandenberger	Switzerland
AC	Ferdy Denzler	Switzerland
AC	Olof Ahlberg	Sweden
AC	Karel Otáhal	Czechoslovakia
AC	Jakub Obrovský	Czechoslovakia
AC	Jindřich Severa	Czechoslovakia

Unknown event

The following sculptors took part:

Rank	Name	Country
AC	Karl Stemolak	Austria
AC	Kostas Valsamis	Greece
AC	Peter Peri	Great Britain
AC	Leoncillo Leonardi	Italy
AC	Marcel Chauvenet	France
AC	Marino Mazzacurati	Italy
AC	Maurice Lambert	Great Britain
AC	Michael Drobil	Austria
AC	Otto Hofner	Austria
AC	Paul Vincze	Great Britain
AC	Tait McKenzie	Canada
AC	Raymond Coulon	France

Rank	Name	Country
AC	René Iché	France
AC	Robert Allan Miller	Great Britain
AC	Siegfried Charoux	Great Britain
AC	Hugo Daini	Italy
AC	V. Robinson Hodge	Great Britain
AC	Wäinö Aaltonen	Finland
AC	Walter Linck	Switzerland
AC	Rosamund Fletcher	Great Britain
AC	Chintamoni Kar	Great Britain
AC	Norman Tyrrell	Great Britain
AC	Antoni Kenar	Poland
AC	Jakub Obrovský	Czechoslovakia

Rank	Name	Country
AC	Guy Van Den Steen	Belgium
AC	Alex Walter Diggelmann	Switzerland
AC	Knud Nellemose	Denmark
AC	Filippo Sgarlata	Italy
AC	Ferdinand Opitz	Austria
AC	Edmund Moiret	Austria
AC	Albin Döbrich	Austria
AC	Karin Jarl-Sakellarios	Austria
AC	Jack Downing	Great Britain
AC	Charles Stanier	Great Britain
AC	W. G. Webb	Great Britain
AC	Gertrude Bohnert	Switzerland
