= Ślusarczyk =

Ślusarczyk is a Polish surname. Notable people with the surname include:

- Jan Ślusarczyk, Polish sculptor
- Piotr Ślusarczyk, Polish politician
