= Robert Norgate =

Robert Norgate may refer to:

- Robert Norgate (priest)
- Robert Norgate (sculptor)
