= Coverley =

Coverley is a surname. Notable people and characters with the name include:

== People ==
=== Surname ===
- Aubrey Coverley (1895–1953), Australian politician in Western Australia
- Bernardine Coverley, writer, mistress of Lucien Freud and mother of British fashion designer Bella Freud
- Victor Coverley-Price (1901–1988), British painter

=== Other names ===
- Edward Coverley Kennedy (1879–1939), Royal Navy officer
- Ludovic Henry Coverley Kennedy (1919–2009), Scottish journalist, broadcaster, and author
- Marjorie Coverley Luesebrink (1943–2023), American writer and scholar

== Fictional characters ==
- Major de Coverley, in the book and film Catch-22
- Terri Coverley, in the British TV comedy series The Thick of It

== See also ==
- Louise Bennett-Coverley (1919–2006), Jamaican poet, folklorist, writer, and educator
- Roger de Coverley, an English and Scottish country dance
- Coverley, a house of Aireborough Grammar School in Aireborough, England
