= Helen Sampson =

British painter (1885–1976)

- Born: Helen Nina Sampson; 18 March 1885; London, England
- Died: 30 December 1976 (aged 91); Aylesbury, England
- Occupation: Painter

Helen Nina Sampson (18 March 1885 – 30 December 1976) was a British painter. Her work was part of the painting event in the art competition at the 1948 Summer Olympics.
