= Margarete Markl =

Austrian sculptor

- Born: 30 May 1902; Vienna, Austria-Hungary
- Died: 8 January 1981 (aged 78); Vienna, Austria
- Occupation: Sculptor

Margarete Markl (30 May 1902 – 8 January 1981) was an Austrian sculptor. Her work was part of the sculpture event in the art competition at the 1948 Summer Olympics.
