= Sun Zongwei =

Chinese painter

- 孫宗慰
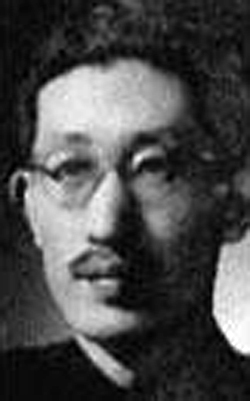
- Born: July 1912; Changzhou, China
- Died: May 1979 (aged 66)
- Education: Nanjing University
- Occupation: Painter

Sun Zongwei (Mandarin Chinese: 孫宗慰 ; July 1912 – May 1979) was a Chinese painter.

== Biography ==
Born in 1912, in Jiangsu Province Sun was a student of Xu Beihong at the Department of Fine Arts of the National Central University of Nanjing. He graduated in 1938 and subsequently was commissioned to be a war artist in the second Sino-Japanese War. Sometime around early 1940, Sun worked as an assistant teacher in Nanjing and was involved in the restoration of the Mogao Caves .

After World War II, Sun would spend several years in Europe, and participated in the painting event in the art competition at the 1948 Summer Olympics. Upon his return to China, Sun was appointed professor at the Central Academy of Drama.

During the Cultural Revolution, many of Sun's artworks were deemed reactionary and many of his works were lost or destroyed.

== Style ==
Coming from Nanjing university, Sun initially emphasized realism and technical virtuosity in his early artworks, but would go on to differentiate himself by choosing to portray both modern and traditional styles of Chinese painting, specializing in depicting Buddhist subjects and ethic minorities such as Mongols and Tibetans in a variety of mediums, including oil paints, watercolours and ink.

== Bibliography ==
Benezit Dictionary of Artists vol. 13, eds., Graund, January 1999, 13440 p. (ISBN 2700030230), p. 361.
