= Stanislav Binar =

Czech sculptor

- Born: 8 August 1908; Brno, Austria-Hungary
- Died: 20 March 1969 (aged 60)
- Occupation: Sculptor

Stanislav Binar (8 August 1908 – 20 March 1969) was a Czechoslovak sculptor. His work was part of the sculpture event in the art competition at the 1948 Summer Olympics.
