= Dimitrios Kokotsis =

Greek painter (1894–1961)

- Born: 28 March 1894; Agios Georgios, Greece
- Died: 1961 (aged 66–67); New York City, U.S.
- Occupation: Painter

Dimitrios Kokotsis (28 March 1894 – 1961) was a Greek painter. His work was part of the painting event in the art competition at the 1948 Summer Olympics.
