= Alf von Chmielowski =

Austrian painter

- Born: 22 April 1896; Olomouc, Austria-Hungary
- Died: 23 June 1967 (aged 71); Vienna, Austria
- Occupation: Painter

Alf von Chmielowski (22 April 1896 – 23 June 1967) was an Austrian painter. His work was part of the painting event in the art competition at the 1948 Summer Olympics.
