= Max Frey (Austrian painter) =

Austrian painter

- Born: 14 February 1902; Klosterneuburg, Austria-Hungary
- Died: 26 November 1955 (aged 53); Vienna, Austria
- Occupation: Painter

Max Frey (14 February 1902 – 26 November 1955) was an Austrian painter. His work was part of the painting event in the art competition at the 1948 Summer Olympics.
