= Jacques Maloubier =

French painter

- Born: 23 January 1920; New York, New York, United States
- Died: 5 March 2001 (aged 81); Southern Pines, North Carolina, United States
- Occupation: Painter

Jacques Maloubier (23 January 1920 – 5 March 2001) was a French painter. His work was part of the painting event in the art competition at the 1948 Summer Olympics.
