= Peter Stebbing =

British painter (1914–1991)

- Born: Peter Evelyn Stebbing; 14 May 1914; Chertsey, England
- Died: 28 August 1991 (aged 77); Woodborough, Wiltshire, England
- Occupation: Painter

Peter Evelyn Stebbing (14 May 1914 – 28 August 1991) was a British painter. His work was part of the painting event in the art competition at the 1948 Summer Olympics.
