= Helena Bukowska-Szlekys =

Polish sculptor (1899 - 1954)

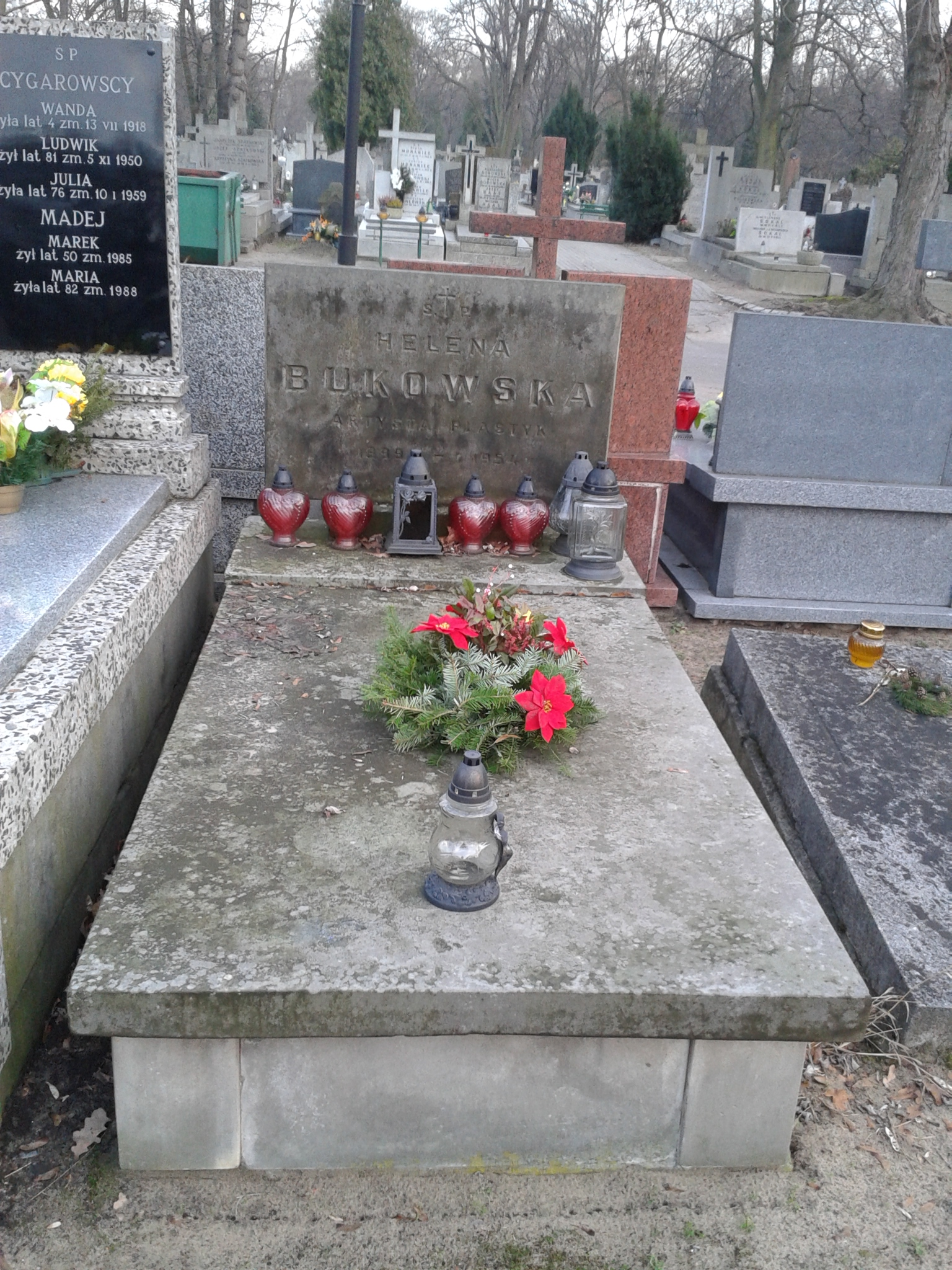
- The grave of Helena Bukowska-Szlekys at the Bródnowski Cemetery in Warsaw
- Born: 2 March 1899; Siberia, Russia
- Died: 2 May 1954 (aged 55); Craiova, Romania
- Occupation: Weaver

Helena Bukowska-Szlekys (2 March 1899 – 2 May 1954) was a Polish artist and weaver. Her work was part of the painting and applied arts event in the art competition at the 1948 Summer Olympics in London, England, United Kingdom. She is considered as a pioneer of the industrial production of carpets with distinctive patterns.

== Early life ==
Bukowska-Szlekys was born on 2 March 1899 in Siberia, Russia. Her father was an engineer who worked building railways in different parts of Russia so she grew up in various parts of the country. In 1919, she moved to Poland where she studied graphics and painting in Vilnius.

== Career ==
In 1933, Bukowska-Szlekys was appointed head of the weaving department of the Academy of Fine Arts in Warsaw while studying interior design and mural painting. She graduated in 1936. Her work on weaving techniques, which combined her own modern patterns with tradition and folk art, has resulted in her being considered a pioneer of the industrial production of carpets with distinctive patterns.

After World War II, Bukowska-Szlekys entered her woven tapestry, Biegacz (Polish for 'Runner'), into the painting and applied arts category for the Polish qualification event the 1948 Summer Olympics in London, England, United Kingdom. She won second prize in the qualification event and her piece, known in English as The Athlete was entered into the art competition.

Her work was displayed as part of the art exhibition which was held at the Victoria and Albert Museum from 15 July to 14 August 1948. She did not medal in the painting and applied arts event and was listed as also competed.

Bukowska-Szlekys also designed the interior of the Polish ocean liner TSS Stefan Batory.

== Personal life ==
Bukowska-Szlekys married Olgierd Szlekys, an interior designer, decorator, painter and caricaturist.

== Death ==
Bukowska-Szlekys died on 2 May 1954 in Craiova, Romania.
