= Charles Stanier =

British sculptor

- Born: 17 April 1886; Amblecote, England
- Died: 9 January 1956 (aged 69); Stourbridge, England
- Occupation: Sculptor

Charles Stanier (17 April 1886 – 9 January 1956) was a British sculptor. His work was part of the sculpture event in the art competition at the 1948 Summer Olympics.
