= Paul Fromentier =

French painter

- Born: 1 March 1914; Lyon, France
- Died: 29 October 1981 (aged 67); Paris, France
- Occupation: Painter

Paul Fromentier (1 March 1914 – 29 October 1981) was a French painter. His work was part of the painting event in the art competition at the 1948 Summer Olympics.
