= Berkeley Moir =

British architect (1912–2006)

- Born: Berkeley Lowndes Moir; 1912; Congleton, England
- Died: 27 November 2006 (aged 93–94); Rochdale, England
- Occupation: Architect

Berkeley Lowndes Moir (1912 – 27 November 2006) was a British architect. His work was part of the architecture event in the art competition at the 1948 Summer Olympics.
