= Giuseppe Riccobaldi del Bava =

Italian painter

- Born: 4 July 1887; Florence, Italy
- Died: 21 April 1976 (aged 88); Genoa, Italy
- Occupation: Painter

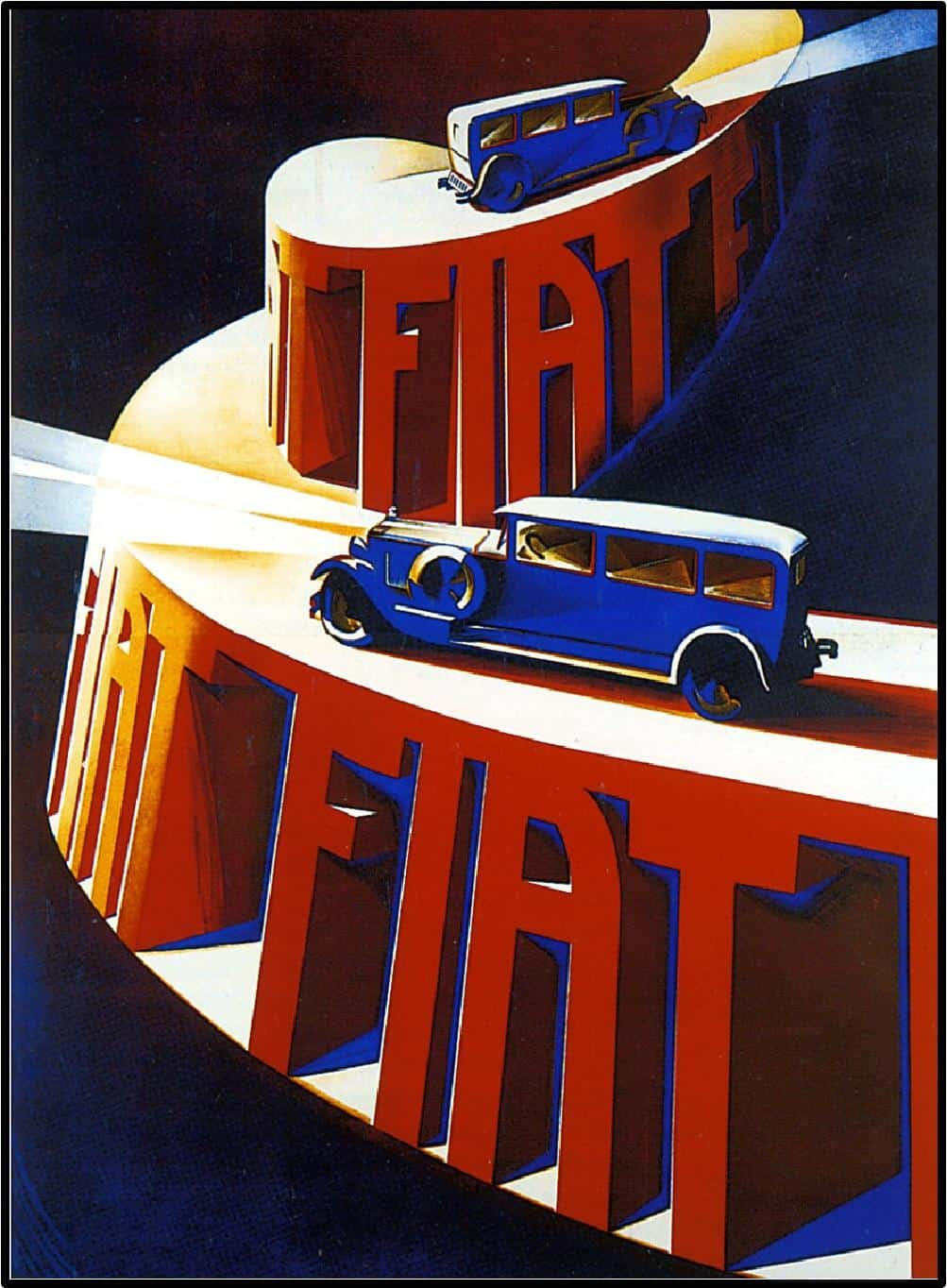
Advertisement poster for Fiat cars painted by Giuseppe Riccobaldi del Bava.

Giuseppe Riccobaldi del Bava (4 July 1887 – 21 April 1976) was an Italian painter. His work was part of the painting event in the art competition at the 1948 Summer Olympics. He is most noted for his work on travel, marketing and industrial posters.
