= Jack Néel =

French architect (1907-1973)

- Born: 28 February 1907; Le Puy-en-Velay, France
- Died: 16 January 1973 (aged 65); Paris, France
- Occupation: Architect

Jack Néel (28 February 1907 – 16 January 1973) was a French architect. His work was part of the architecture event in the art competition at the 1948 Summer Olympics.
