= John Sanderson-Wells =

British painter

- Born: August 1872
- Died: 16 March 1955 (aged 82); Ealing, England
- Occupation: Painter

John Sanderson-Wells (August 1872 – 16 March 1955) was a British painter. His work was part of the painting event in the art competition at the 1948 Summer Olympics.
