= Paula Maly =

Austrian painter (1891–1974)

- Born: 21 October 1891; Vienna, Austria-Hungary
- Died: 19 October 1974 (aged 82); Graz, Austria
- Occupation: Painter
- Political party: Nazi Party

Paula Maly (21 October 1891 – 19 October 1974) was an Austrian painter. Her work was part of the painting event in the art competition at the 1948 Summer Olympics. She joined the Nazi Party (NSDAP), though it appears she did not create any propaganda for the party. Her work is in the collection of the Albertina in Vienna, and the Graz Museum. She was the sister of the painter Ida Maly. who did not survive the Nazi regime.
