= Vittorio Piscopo =

Italian painter

- Born: 24 October 1913; Naples, Italy
- Died: 20 November 2004 (aged 91); Naples, Italy
- Occupation: Painter

Vittorio Piscopo (24 October 1913 – 20 November 2004) was an Italian painter. His work was part of the painting event in the art competition at the 1948 Summer Olympics. He was a part of the Neapolitan Futurist Movement in 1933, as well as an exponent of circumvisionismo, a Neapolitan avant-garde movement under fascism.
