= Vlastibor Klimeš (architect) =

Czech architect

- Born: 24 May 1924; Hradec Králové, Czechoslovakia
- Died: 11 February 2009 (aged 84); Prague, Czech Republic
- Occupation: Architect

Vlastibor Klimeš (24 May 1924 – 11 February 2009) was a Czech architect. His work was part of the architecture event in the art competition at the 1948 Summer Olympics.
