= Jerry Critchlow =

British painter

- Born: 21 June 1904; Wolverhampton, England
- Died: 29 September 1972 (aged 68); Hammersmith, England
- Occupation: Painter

Jerry Critchlow (21 June 1904 – 29 September 1972) was a British painter. His work was part of the painting event in the art competition at the 1948 Summer Olympics.
