= Elli Riehl =

Austrian painter

- Born: 19 December 1902; Villach, Austria-Hungary
- Died: 8 September 1977 (aged 74); Winklern, Austria
- Occupation: Painter

Elli Riehl (19 December 1902 – 8 September 1977) was an Austrian painter. Her work was part of the painting event in the art competition at the 1948 Summer Olympics.
