= René Borchanne =

Swiss writer

- Born: 5 September 1905; Yverdon-les-Bains, Switzerland
- Died: 16 March 1979 (aged 73)
- Occupation: Writer

René Borchanne (5 September 1905 – 16 March 1979) was a Swiss writer. His work was part of the literature event in the art competition at the 1948 Summer Olympics.
