= Cosmo Clark =

British painter

John Cosmo Clark
- Born: 24 January 1897; Chelsea, England
- Died: 7 August 1967 (aged 70); Hammersmith, England
- Occupation: Painter

John Cosmo Clark (24 January 1897 – 7 August 1967) was a British painter. His work was part of the painting event in the art competition at the 1948 Summer Olympics.
