= Hans Breidbach-Bernau =

Austrian writer

- Born: Hans Gustav Alfred Breidbach-Bernau; 16 March 1921; Vienna, Austria
- Died: 15 May 2014 (aged 93); Bad Ischl, Austria
- Occupation: Writer

Hans Gustav Alfred Breidbach-Bernau (16 March 1921 – 15 May 2014) was an Austrian writer. He competed in the "epic works" category of the art competitions at the 1948 Summer Olympics, but did not win a medal. He was born in Vienna and worked in photojournalism during World War II. Following the conflict he took up freelance writing in addition to roles as an athletics coach and sports publicist. He died in Bad Ischl on 15 May 2014.
