= Co Derr =

Dutch sculptor

- Born: 21 July 1921; Amsterdam, Netherlands
- Died: 27 April 2011 (aged 89); Stockholm, Sweden
- Occupation: Sculptor

Co Derr (21 July 1921 – 27 April 2011) was a Dutch sculptor. His work was part of the sculpture event in the art competition at the 1948 Summer Olympics.
