= Lucien Fontanarosa =

French painter

- Born: 19 December 1912; Paris, France
- Died: 27 April 1975 (aged 62); Paris, France
- Occupation: Painter

Lucien Fontanarosa (19 December 1912 – 27 April 1975) was a French painter. His work was part of the painting event in the art competition at the 1948 Summer Olympics.
