= Jindřich Severa =

Czech sculptor

- Born: 5 April 1909; Kopidlno, Austria-Hungary
- Died: 9 November 1980 (aged 71); Prague, Czechoslovakia
- Occupation: Sculptor

Jindřich Severa (5 April 1909 – 9 November 1980) was a Czech sculptor. His work was part of the sculpture event in the art competition at the 1948 Summer Olympics.
