= Karel Kuthan =

Czech architect (1900–1962)

- Born: 24 September 1900
- Died: 22 December 1962 (aged 62)
- Occupation: Architect

Karel Kuthan (24 September 1900 – 22 December 1962) was a Czech architect. His work was part of the architecture event in the art competition at the 1948 Summer Olympics.
