= Angelo Di Castro =

Italian sculptor

- Born: 12 December 1925; Rome, Italy
- Died: 3 June 2012 (aged 86); Rome, Italy
- Occupation: Sculptor

Angelo Di Castro (12 December 1925 – 3 June 2012) was an Italian sculptor. His work was part of the sculpture event in the art competition at the 1948 Summer Olympics.
