= Jack Downing (sculptor) =

British sculptor (1920–1993)

- Born: John Clifford Downing; 1 January 1920; Bromsgrove, England
- Died: 11 July 1993 (aged 73); Stourbridge, England
- Occupation: Sculptor

John Clifford Downing (1 January 1920 – 11 July 1993) was a British sculptor. His work was part of the sculpture event in the art competition at the 1948 Summer Olympics.
