= Werner Gallusser =

Swiss composer (born 1923)

- Born: 12 July 1923; Budapest, Hungary
- Occupation: Composer

Werner Gallusser (born 12 July 1923) was a Hungarian-born Swiss composer. His work was part of the music event in the art competition at the 1948 Summer Olympics.
