= Ian James Scott =

British painter

- Born: 30 July 1914; London, England
- Died: 25 January 2010 (aged 95); Slough, England
- Occupations: Painter and Cartoonist

Ian James Scott (30 July 1914 – 25 January 2010), the British painter and cartoonist, was born Isaac Yaacov Oskotsky in Mother Levy's Home, Stepney, in London's East End in 1914. One of his two younger brothers, Bernard (Ben), became a professional painter and he also had a younger sister. After attending the Raynes Foundation School he studied at St Martin's School of Art (1928–32) and at the Royal College of Art (1932–35) and began contributing cartoons and illustrations to the Daily Express and other publications while still a student.

At St Martin's he befriended Michael Goldberg (later Gilbery) and the artistic skills of these two young Jewish artists from the East End became apparent when paintings by both teenagers were accepted for display at the Royal Academy Summer Exhibition of 1931.

To commemorate the coronation of King George VI and Queen Elizabeth in 1937 Goldberg and Oskotsky were commissioned to create a gigantic 'Royal Historic Cavalcade', a series of 25 foot high oil paintings of historic British royal figures that covered the frontage of a large Oxford Street store.

After service in World War II Oskotsky returned to London, changing his name to Ian James Scott. He was active as a political cartoonist, including contributing to the Daily Sketch and News Chronicle in the 1950s; and he was the founder and first Chairman of the Cartoonists' Club of Great Britain.

His work was part of the painting event in the art competition at the 1948 Summer Olympics.

In 2010 at the age of 95, Scott died after a fall at his home in Eton.
