= Geoffrey Holden =

British painter

- Born: 18 August 1916; Cheltenham, England
- Died: 6 April 1992 (aged 75); Eastbourne, England
- Occupation: Painter

Geoffrey Holden (18 August 1916 – 6 April 1992) was a British painter. His work was part of the painting event in the art competition at the 1948 Summer Olympics.
