= Frederick Austin =

British painter (1902–1990)

- Born: Frederick George Austin; 31 January 1902; Leicester, England
- Died: October 1990 (aged 88); London, England
- Occupations: Painter, etcher and engraver

Frederick George Austin (31 January 1902 – October 1990) was a British painter, etcher and engraver.

Austin studied at Leicester College of Art and his brother was Robert Austin. He won the Prix de Rome in 1927 for his work Flight into Egypt. His work was part of the painting event in the art competition at the 1948 Summer Olympics.
