= Alfred Ferraz =

French architect

- Born: 17 June 1907; Saint-Chamond, France
- Died: 11 December 1989 (aged 82)
- Occupation: Architect

Alfred Ferraz (17 June 1907 – 11 December 1989) was a French architect. His work was part of the architecture event in the art competition at the 1948 Summer Olympics.
