= Alois Mitschek =

Austrian painter

- Born: 14 March 1889; Vienna, Austria-Hungary
- Died: 3 April 1974 (aged 85); Vienna, Austria
- Occupation: Painter

Alois Mitschek (14 March 1889 – 3 April 1974) was an Austrian painter. His work was part of the painting event in the art competition at the 1948 Summer Olympics.
