= Cecily Briant =

British painter

- Born: 11 August 1891; Lambeth, England
- Died: 10 July 1971 (aged 79); Westminster, England
- Occupation: Painter

Cecily Briant (11 August 1891 – 10 July 1971) was a British painter. Her work was part of the painting event in the art competition at the 1948 Summer Olympics.

== Biography ==
Briant was born on 11 August 1891 in Lambeth, London. Briant's work was part of the painting event in the art competition at the 1948 Summer Olympics.
