= Sjoerd Joustra =

Dutch architect

- Born: 3 January 1916; Sneek, Netherlands
- Died: 7 July 2001 (aged 85); Zevenaar, Netherlands
- Occupation: Architect

Sjoerd Joustra (3 January 1916 – 7 July 2001) was a Dutch architect. His work was part of the architecture event in the art competition at the 1948 Summer Olympics.
