= Sybil Kennedy =

Canadian sculptor

- Born: 13 August 1899; Quebec City, Quebec, Canada
- Died: 5 June 1986 (aged 86); Montreal, Quebec, Canada
- Occupation: Sculptor

Sybil Kennedy (13 August 1899 – 5 June 1986) was a Canadian sculptor. Her work was part of the sculpture event in the art competition at the 1948 Summer Olympics.
