= Freda Hands =

British painter

- Born: 4 March 1918; London, England
- Died: 3 February 2007 (aged 88); Brentwood, England
- Occupation: Painter

Freda Hands (4 March 1918 – 3 February 2007) was a British painter. Her work was part of the painting event in the art competition at the 1948 Summer Olympics. Hands was most notable for her calligraphy. Works include The Book of the Baptism Service of Prince Charles.
