= Joel Laikka =

Finnish writer

- Born: 9 May 1906; Vyborg, Russia
- Died: 11 February 1982 (aged 75); Helsinki, Finland
- Occupation: Writer

Joel Laikka (9 May 1906 – 11 February 1982) was a Finnish writer. His work was part of the literature event in the art competition at the 1948 Summer Olympics. He was the author of several novels and also published under the pseudonym Pekka Pire.

== Selected works ==
=== Novels ===
- Isoa miestä lapsettaa eli kuolematon mestariteos : leikillinen romaani (1943)
- Jääräpää suomalainen: historiallinen romaani (1944)
- Postimestari katoaa: leikillinen romaani (1944)
- Aikamiehen aapinen : leikillinen romaani, kansikuva ja vignetit Henrik Tikkanen (1945)
- Jääräpää tulee takaisin : historiallinen romaani (1945)
- Kenraali : nuorisoromaani (1946)
- Isänmaa myytävänä : romaani yksinäisestä miehestä (1946, published under the name Pekka Pire)
- Itseoppinut konsuli : leikillinen romaani (1948)
- Vihreä shakkilauta : romaani (1948)
- Perintösormus : romaani itsenäisyystaistelun eräästä vaiheesta (1955)

=== Other ===
- Elämä, anna minulle ihanne: urheilijanuorukaisen tie (1936, autobiographical)
- Taulu (1940, play in one act)
- Kaksi päivää ministerinä: omatekoisen valtiomiehen tukalia hetkiä (1942)
- Ankka poikineen : vuoden ensimmäinen ja viimeinen numero (1943)
