= Kalervo Tuukkanen =

Finnish composer (1909–1979)

Olympic medal record

Art competitions
Silver medal – second place	1948 London	Choral and orchestral

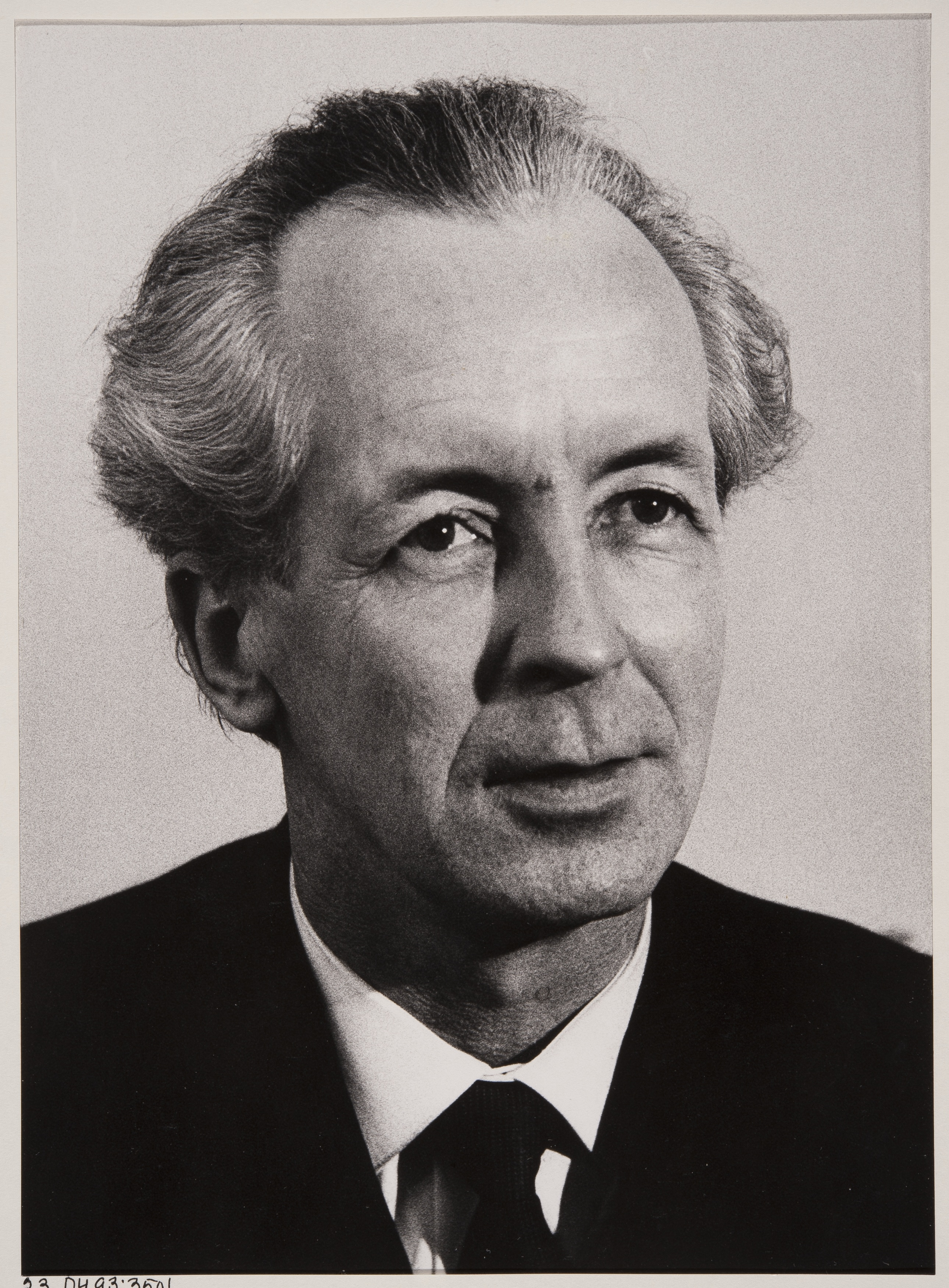
Kalervo Tuukkanen.

Kalervo Tuukkanen (14 October 1909 – 12 July 1979) was a Finnish composer. He was born in Mikkeli and died in Helsinki. In 1948 he won a silver medal in the art competitions of the Olympic Games for his Karhunpyynti ("Bear Hunt").

His output consist of six symphonies and several other works.
