= Edmund Reitter (sculptor) =

Austrian sculptor

Edmund Reitter (April 21, 1904 – March 17, 2005) was an Austrian sculptor. He submitted some of his work into the Statues event of the "Mixed Sculpturing" category of the art competitions at the 1948 Summer Olympics, but did not win a medal. Born in Bratislava, he trained as a gymnast prior to and during his study of architecture and sculpture and won a national gymnastics competition in Bratislava in 1931. His sculptures, which often centered on sports figures, were exhibited in galleries across Europe. He died in March 2005 at the age of 100 in Altlengbach.
