= Sergio Lauricella =

Italian composer

Olympic medal record

Art competitions
Bronze medal – third place	1948 London	Instrumental/chamber

Sergio Lauricella (June 19, 1921 – May 2, 2008) was an Italian composer and music educator. He was born in Naples. In 1948 he won a bronze medal in the art competitions of the Olympic Games for his "Toccata per Pianoforte" ("Toccata for piano"). From 1979 through 1991 he was the director of the Genoa Conservatory.
