= Othello Zavaroni =

French architect

- Born: 29 March 1910; Paris, France
- Died: 28 February 1991 (aged 80); Menouville, France
- Occupation: Architect

Othello Zavaroni (29 March 1910 – 28 February 1991) was a French architect. His work was part of the architecture event in the art competition at the 1948 Summer Olympics.
