= Oskar Thiede =

Austrian sculptor

Olympic medal record

Art competitions
Silver medal – second place	1948 London	Sculpture

Oskar Thiede (February 13, 1879 – November 22, 1961) was an Austrian sculptor. He was born and died in Vienna. In 1948 he won a silver medal in the art competitions of the Olympic Games for his "Eight Sports Plaques".
