= Siegfried Theiß =

Austrian architect

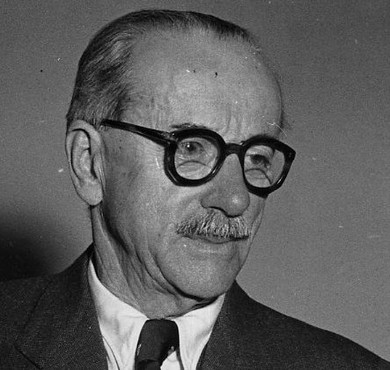
- Theiß in 1953
- Born: 17 November 1882; Bratislava, Austria-Hungary
- Died: 24 January 1963 (aged 80); Vienna, Austria
- Occupation: Architect

Siegfried Theiß (17 November 1882 – 24 January 1963) was an Austrian architect. His work was part of the architecture event in the art competition at the 1948 Summer Olympics.
