= Elsy Blom-Wirz =

Swiss sculptor

- Born: 7 June 1915; Basel, Switzerland
- Died: 6 January 1985 (aged 69); Locarno, Switzerland
- Occupation: Sculptor

Elsy Blom-Wirz (7 June 1915 – 6 January 1985) was a Swiss sculptor. Her work was part of the sculpture event in the art competition at the 1948 Summer Olympics.
