= Doris Hedges =

Canadian writer

- Born: Doris Edith Ryde; 10 April 1896; Lachine, Quebec, Canada
- Died: 14 July 1972 (aged 76); Montreal, Quebec, Canada
- Occupation: Writer

Doris Hedges (10 April 1896 – 14 July 1972) was a Canadian writer.

== Biography ==
Hedges was born in Lachine, Quebec in 1900.

She competed as part of the literature event in the art competition at the 1948 Summer Olympics, the last Olympics when Arts was included as an event. She competed in the Mixed Literature category with a work called The Boxing Lessons.

Hedges was an author of science fiction and fantasy literature, and was also a well established poet and novelist. She served overseas in World War I. During World War II she was National Chairman of Publicity for the Wings for Britain Fund. She appeared on various networks as a commentator.

== Works ==
- The Flower in the Dusk, 1946
- Crisis, 1947
- Words on a Page and Other Poems, 1949
- Dumb Spirit: A Novel of Montreal, 1952
- The Dream is Certain, 1954
- Elixir, 1954
- Robin, 1957
- For This I Live: Poems, 1963
- Inside Out, 1971
