= Vera Matthews-Irving =

Canadian painter

- Born: 1 September 1913; Toronto, Ontario, Canada
- Died: 5 July 2008 (aged 94)
- Occupation: Painter

Vera Matthews-Irving (1 September 1913 – 5 July 2008) was a Canadian painter. Her work was part of the painting event in the art competition at the 1948 Summer Olympics.
