= George Pilkington (painter) =

South African painter

- Born: 18 September 1879; Cape Town, Cape Colony
- Died: 17 April 1958 (aged 78); Cape Town, South Africa
- Occupation: Painter

George Pilkington (18 September 1879 – 17 April 1958) was a South African painter. His work was part of the painting event in the art competition at the 1948 Summer Olympics.
