= Georges Tourry =

French architect

- Born: 14 May 1904; Paris, France
- Died: 16 July 1991 (aged 87)
- Occupation: Architect

Georges Tourry (14 May 1904 – 16 July 1991) was a French architect. His work was part of the architecture event in the art competition at the 1948 Summer Olympics.
