= François Hertel =

Canadian writer

- Born: 31 May 1905; Rivière-Ouelle, Quebec, Canada
- Died: 4 October 1985 (aged 80); Montreal, Quebec, Canada
- Occupation: Writer

François Hertel (31 May 1905 – 4 October 1985) was a Canadian writer. His work was part of the literature event in the art competition at the 1948 Summer Olympics.
