= Guy Ardilouze =

French architect

- Born: 27 January 1908; Condom, France
- Died: 8 December 1944 (aged 36); Brives, France
- Occupation: Architect

Guy Ardilouze (27 January 1908 – 8 December 1944) was a French architect. He died in a plane crash in 1944. His work was posthumously part of the architecture event in the art competition at the 1948 Summer Olympics.
