= Lotti Lobsiger-Schibli =

Swiss painter

- Born: 14 July 1912; Bern, Switzerland
- Died: 2 July 1975 (aged 62); Bern, Switzerland
- Occupation: Painter

Lotti Lobsiger-Schibli (14 July 1912 – 2 July 1975) was a Swiss painter. Her work was part of the painting event in the art competition at the 1948 Summer Olympics.
