= Heikki Asunta =

Finnish writer

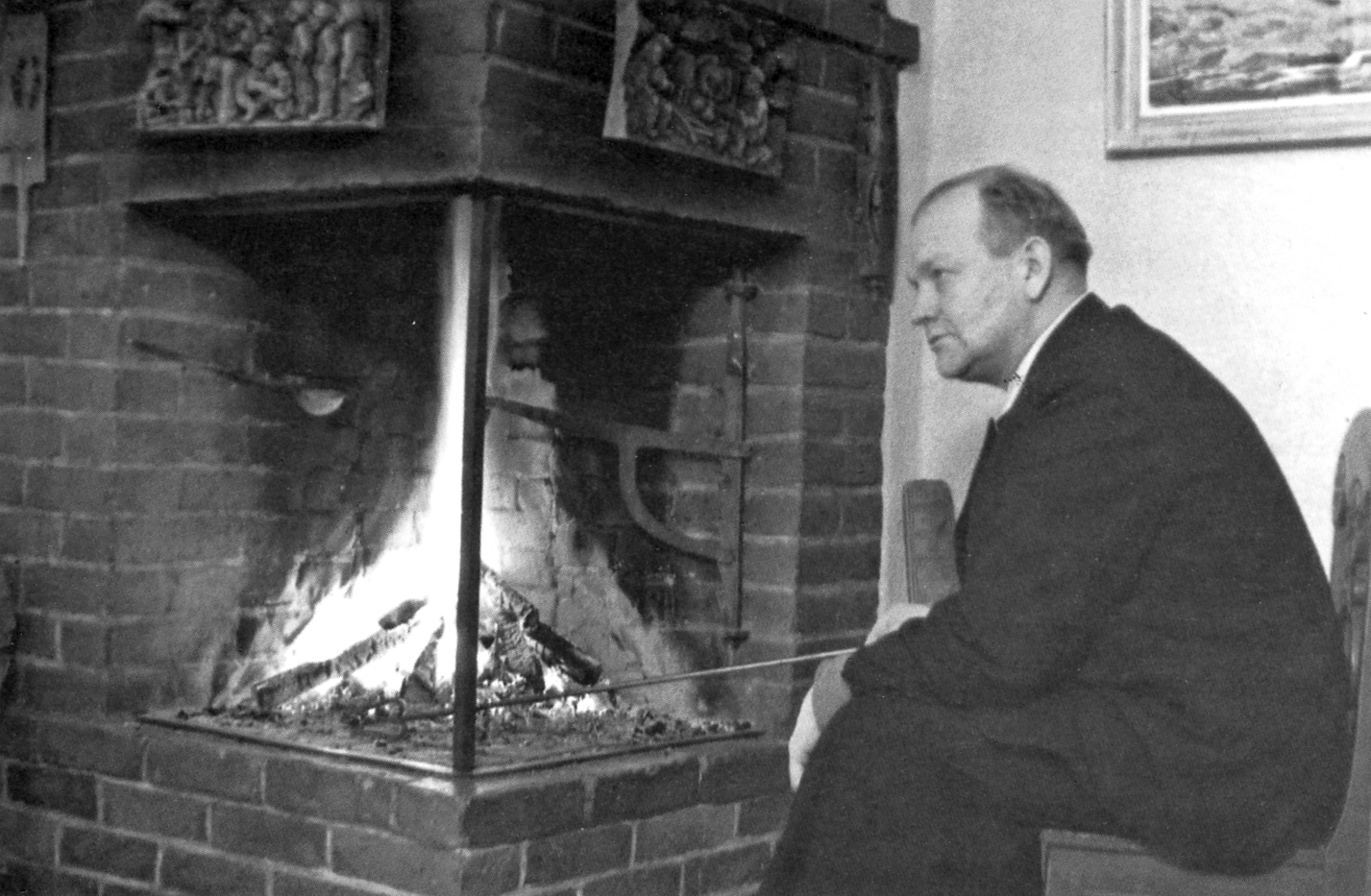
- Heikki Asunta in 1949
- Born: 25 June 1904; Ruovesi, Finland
- Died: 28 June 1959 (aged 55); Ruovesi, Finland
- Occupation: Writer

Heikki Asunta (25 June 1904 – 28 June 1959) was a Finnish writer. His work was part of the literature event in the art competition at the 1948 Summer Olympics.
