= Olof Ahlberg =

Swedish sculptor (1876–1956)

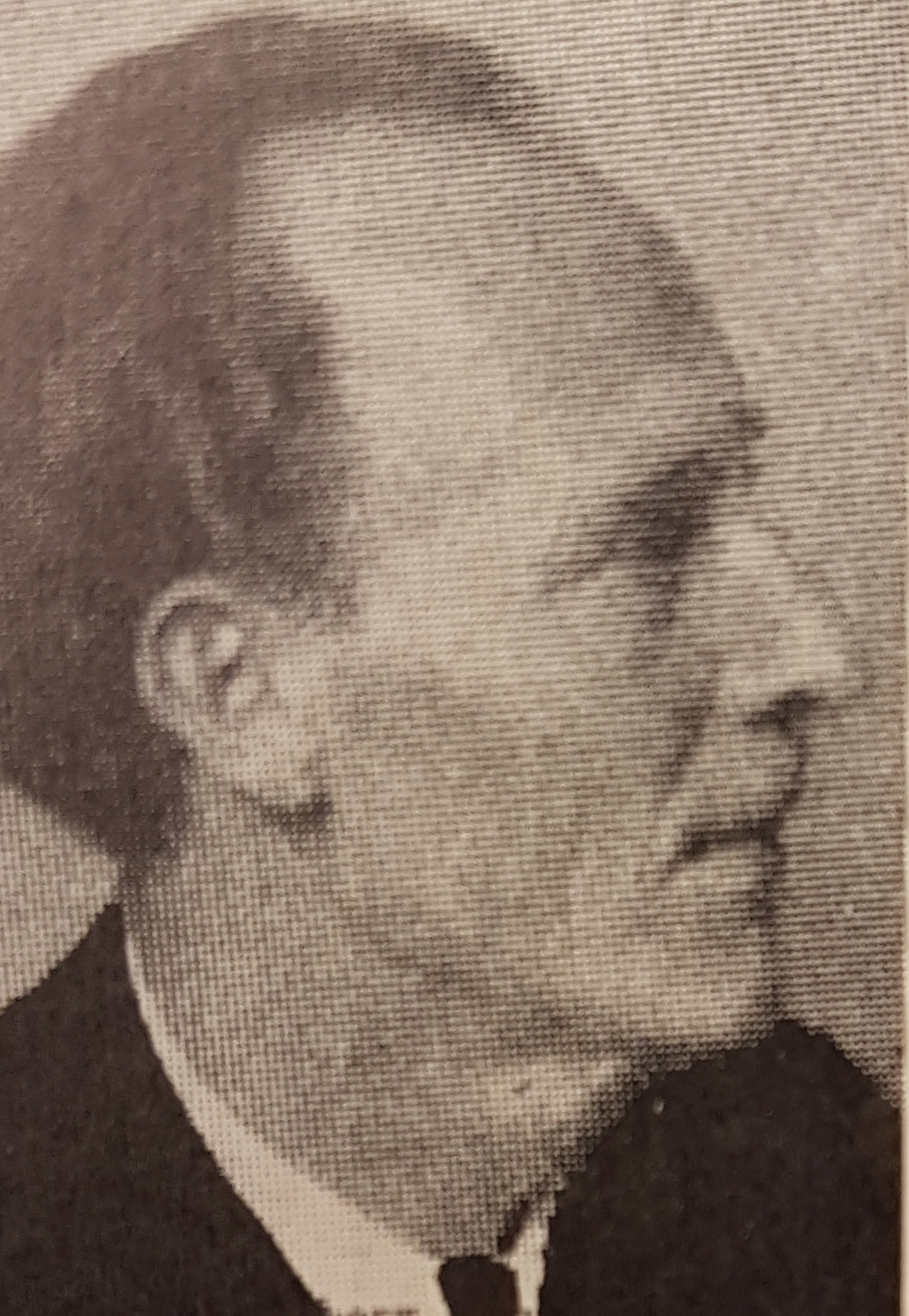
- Born: 18 November 1876; Häggenås, Sweden
- Died: 8 June 1956 (aged 79); Stockholm, Sweden
- Occupation: Sculptor

Olof Ahlberg (18 November 1876 – 8 June 1956) was a Swedish sculptor. He is known for his human sculptures with classical and jugend features.

His work was part of the sculpture event in the art competition at the 1948 Summer Olympics.
