= Guy Sabrou =

French architect

- Born: 2 July 1908; Bergerac, France
- Died: 18 December 1993 (aged 85); Paris, France
- Occupation: Architect

Guy Sabrou (2 July 1908 – 18 December 1993) was a French architect. His work was part of the architecture event in the art competition at the 1948 Summer Olympics.

== Life ==
Guy Sabrou was trained by Roger-Henri Expert at the Beaux-Arts de Paris from 1934 to 1938.
