= Norman Tyrrell =

British sculptor (1897–1948)

- Born: Norman Frederick Tyrrell; 25 August 1897; London, England
- Died: 1948 (aged 50–51); London, England
- Occupation: Sculptor

Norman Frederick Tyrrell (25 August 1897 – 1948) was a British sculptor. His work was part of the sculpture event in the art competition at the 1948 Summer Olympics.
