= Patrick Horsbrugh =

American architect

- Born: 21 June 1920; Belfast, Northern Ireland, United Kingdom
- Died: 12 January 2014 (aged 93); South Bend, Indiana, United States
- Occupation: Professor of architecture
- Known for: High Paddington, Environics

Patrick Horsbrugh (21 June 1920 – 12 January 2014) was a British architecture professor. Born in Belfast, he took an interest in architecture at a young age, but his studies were interrupted by military service during World War II. Following the conflict he studied in Britain and the United States before embarking on teaching career that spanned numerous major American universities. He also competed for Great Britain at the art competitions at the 1948 Summer Olympics. As a researcher, he coined the term "environics" to cover the study of the environmental implications of modern architecture development and taught courses on the subject until his retirement. He held the title of professor emeritus at the University of Notre Dame until his death in January 2014.

== Early life ==
Horsbrugh was born on 21 June 1920 in Belfast. Although Scottish in ancestry, his parents had been born in India and his father was a member Canadian Forces who also worked as a taxidermist and hunter. Patrick decided by the age of twelve to pursue a career in architecture and moved to Dorset to further his studies. During World War II he served in the British Army and the Royal Air Force as a member of Coastal Command 279 Squadron stationed at RAF Thornaby. Horsbrugh was stationed with a detachment in northern Scotland to cover the activities of strike and patrol. He was transferred to the Royal Canadian Navy to act as an observer on the country's first aircraft carrier. He also volunteered at the Middlesbrough Survey and Planning office during his leave times. After seven years of military service he studied at a student-run private school known as the Architectural Association School of Architecture and eventually ended up on scholarship to British School at Rome, where he was convinced to study landscape architecture at Harvard University. As a representative of Great Britain, Horsbrugh entered a work entitled "Sailing Club" into the "architectural design" category of the art competitions at the 1948 Summer Olympics, but did not win a medal.

== Teaching career ==
After teaching at Harvard for several years, Horsbrugh lectured at North Carolina State University as a visiting professor in 1952. During this same year, High Paddington was published by Sergei Kadleigh, with Horsbrugh's assistance, describing a vertically built town suitable for eight thousand individuals. After a stint at the University of Illinois at Urbana–Champaign, he spent five years teaching at the University of Nebraska–Lincoln, which was at the time the maximum number of years that a foreigner could be employed with the University of Nebraska system. Although the law was rescinded at the end of his tenure, he had already signed a contract with the University of Texas at Austin, where in 1965 he had planned and hosted a conference on the environmental impact of modern architecture. He spent two and a half more years at the institution prior to arriving at the University of Notre Dame in 1968 to teach environics, a term that he had coined in 1954 to encompass the studies of the interplay between the environment and architecture. During his career he also lectured at the University of California, Berkeley, the University of Florida, the University of Georgia, and Pennsylvania State University.

== Later life ==
He retains the status of professor emeritus at the University of Notre Dame, where he returned in 1984. He is an honorary member of the American Society of Landscape Architects. He resided in South Bend, Indiana until his death in January 2014, at the age of 93.
