= Maria Bujakowa =

Polish sculptor

- Born: 12 May 1901; Kolomyia, Ukraine
- Died: 22 January 1985 (aged 83); Kościelisko, Poland
- Occupation: Sculptor

Maria Bujakowa (12 May 1901 – 22 January 1985) was a Polish sculptor. Her work was part of the sculpture event in the art competition at the 1948 Summer Olympics.
