= Erling Brene =

Danish composer (1896–1980)

Olympic medal record

Art competitions
Bronze medal – third place	1948 London	Choral and orchestral

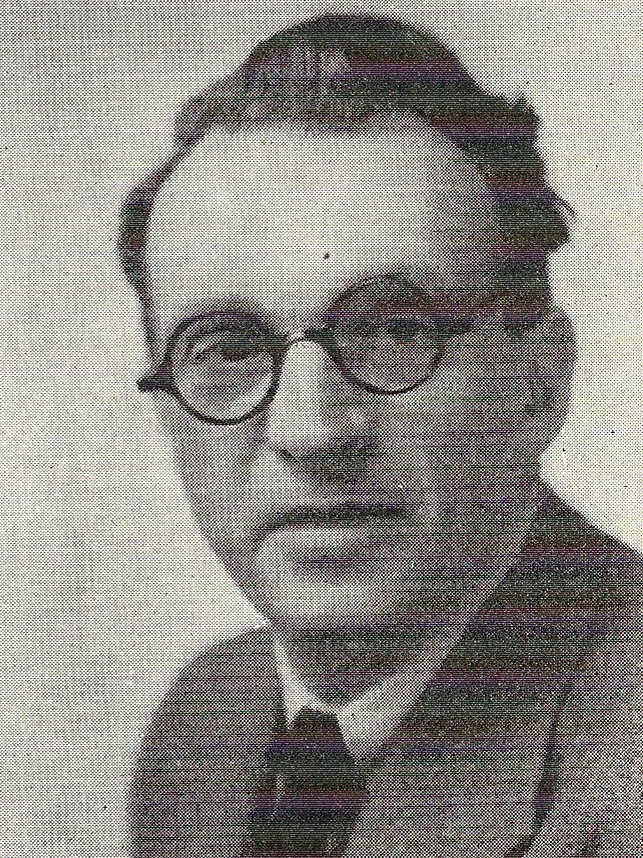
Photograph of Brene

Niels Erling Emmanuel Brene (14 November 1896 – 17 May 1980) was a Danish composer. He was born and died in Copenhagen. In 1948, he won a bronze medal in the art competitions of the Olympic Games for his orchestral composition Vigeur (Vigour).

Erling Brene was an accomplished composer and music teacher from 1950–70 at The Ellebjerg School in Copenhagen.

== Selected works ==
=== Opera ===
- Mordet i værtshuset (Murder at the Inn), chamber opera/puppet comedy, Op.12 (1930)
- Drengen med fløjten, school opera, Op.50 (1950)
- Peter Pan, school opera, Op.54 (1953)
- Under Piletræt, opera after Hans Christian Andersen, Op.55 (1954)
- Besøgeren, opera, Op.66 (1964)

=== Incidental music ===
- Trommer i natten (1930)
- Suite af Musik for marionetteater, Op.18b (1932)

=== Orchestra ===
- Symphony (1920)
- Junkeren og Møllerpigen (1921)
- Sommer, symphony (1924)
- Sinfonietta (1925)
- Tre Stykker (3 Pieces) for chamber orchestra (1926)
- Suite for chamber orchestra, Op.5 (1928)
- Soldatens Ballade (1930)
- Suite from Mordet i værtshuset, Op.14b (1930)
- Suite for string orchestra, Op.21 (1934)
- Ouverture, Op.22
- 3 Epigrammer (3 Epigrams) for string orchestra (1936)
- Capriccio, Op.27 (1936)
- Rapsodi, Op.28 (1936)
- Overture (1939)
- Symphony No.1 "Det ukuelige sind", Op.36 (1941)
- Suite concertante, Op.39 (1942)
- Vigueur, Op.40 (1943)
- Symphony No.2 "Uomo invincibile", Op.46 (1948)
- Komedieouverture (Comedy Overture), Op.51 (1950)
- Blomsterpigen som mæcen eller kærligheden drager forbi, Op.53 (1952)
- Optimistic Play, Op.62 (1959)
- Kontraster (Contrasts), Op.69 (1966)
- 4 Stykker for wind ensemble (1968)
- Symphony No.3, Op.77 (1963)
- 3 Impressioner (3 Impressions), Op.92a (1976)

=== Concertante ===
- Concerto for violin and chamber orchestra, Op.10 (1929)
- Concerto for oboe and chamber orchestra (1932)
- Concerto for clarinet and orchestra (1935)
- Humoreske for orchestra with piano, Op.29 (1936)
- Notturno inquieto for orchestra with piano, Op.31 (1936)
- Concerto senza Solennita for flute and orchestra, Op.20 (1936)
- Concerto No.1 for cello and orchestra, Op.34 (1940)
- Concerto No.1 for piano and orchestra, Op.42 (1946)
- Concerto for wind quintet and string orchestra, Op.45 (1947)
- Concerto for viola and orchestra, Op.47 (1949)
- Kammerkoncert nr.1 for violin and string orchestra, Op.52 (1951)
- Concerto No.2 for piano and orchestra (1955)
- Concertino for recorder and piano, Op.67 (1964)
- Kammerkoncert nr.2 for clarinet and string orchestra, Op.81 (1971)
- Stadier, symphonic pieces for orchestra and piano (1972)
- Concerto No.2 for cello and orchestra, Op.89 (1975)
- Kammerkoncert nr.3 for piano and string orchestra (1977)

=== Chamber music ===
- Elegi for violin and piano (1920)
- String Quartet (1922)
- String Quartet No.1 (1925)
- Kammermusik for flute, clarinet, oboe and bassoon, Op.4 (1927)
- String Quartet No.2, Op.6 (1928)
- Sonata for violin solo, Op.7 (1928)
- Sonata for flute solo, Op.8 (1928)
- Floden, suite for 5 instruments, Op.9 (1929)
- 2 Stykker (2 Pieces) for violin and cello (1931)
- Divertimento for 2 violins and viola (1931)
- Husmusik for flute, clarinet, violin, viola and cello (1931)
- 8 Småstykker (8 Short Pieces) for 2 violins (1932)
- Serenade – til Agnes for flute, clarinet, violin, viola and cello, Op.25 (1935)
- String Quartet No.3, Op.33 (1938)
- Divertimento for flute, violin, viola and cello, Op.38 (1942)
- Wind Quintet, Op.41 (1944)
- Piano Trio (1946)
- Sammenspil, 7 short pieces for violin and piano (1948)
- String Quartet No.4 (1957)
- String Quartet No.5, Op.61 (1959)
- Quintet for flute, violin, viola, cello and harp, Op.71 (1967)
- String Quartet No.6 (1967)
- String Quartet No.7, Op.73 (1968)
- Præludium og capriccio for flute and harp, Op.76 (1969)
- Sonata for violin, clarinet and piano, Op.80 (1970)
- String Quartet No.8 (1970)
- String Quartet No.9, Op.82 (1971)
- Concertino for flute, cello, piano and string orchestra (1973)
- Trio for recorder, cello and piano, Op.85a (1973)
- Duo for flute and clarinet (1974)
- String Quartet No.10, Op.87 (1974)
- Sonata for recorder, Op.92b (1976)
- Duo for flute and guitar (1976)

=== Piano ===
- Sonata for piano (1920)
- 3 Småstykker (3 Short Pieces) for piano (1931)
- To gange tre (Twice Three), short piano pieces, Op.15b (1931)
- Dagens musik (The Day's Music) for piano (1936)
- Sonatina for piano (1941)
- 3 Impressioner (3 Impressions), Op.49b (1949)
- 2 Klaverstykker (2 Piano Pieces) (1966)
- Sonatina for piano (1979)

=== Vocal ===
- Polangins Børn for voice and piano (1928)
- 4 Sange (43 Songs) (1931)
- Skolesange (School Songs) (1932)
- Sange for en altstemme (1935)
- 6 Eenstemmige småsange (1937)
- 3 Sange (3 Songs) (1956)
- 3 Sange (3 Songs) (1961)
- Spanske Kvinder, 3 songs for mezzo-soprano, flute, clarinet and percussion (1962)
- To sange (Two Songs) for baritone and orchestra (1968)
- En Konges Død for soloists and orchestra (1969)
- Vor Frue, cantata for baritone, recorder, cello and harpsichord (1975)

=== Choral ===
- Under Varmebølgen for chorus and piano (1934)
- 5 Sange (5 Songs) for male chorus (1941)
- Blodets Sang (1942)
- Kapel i Arkadien (1946)
- 3 Sange for lige stemmer for chorus
- Sang til Ellebjergskolens indvielse (1949)
- Køkkenmøddingen for soloists, chorus, recorder and percussion (1952)
- Kantate til Ulrikkenborg Skole (1955)
- Antigone for soloist, chorus and orchestra, Op.58 (1957)
- For børnekor og instrumenter (For Children's Chorus and Instruments) (1957)
- Cyklistsang (1959)
- Grønland (1959)
- Athena Lemnia for soloist, chorus and orchestra, Op.63 (1961)
- Erik Glippings drab (1963)
- Aspekter (Aspects) for soprano, tenor, chorus and orchestra, Op.68 (1965)
- 4 Sange for lige stemmer for chorus (1968)
- Nattens sange for soloist, chorus and orchestra (1972)
- Bøndernes tretanello for chorus (1973)
- Pompeji for soloist, chorus and orchestra (1979)
