= Gertrude Bohnert =

Swiss painter (1908–1948)

- Born: 2 April 1908; Lucerne, Switzerland
- Died: 20 September 1948 (aged 40); Lucerne, Switzerland
- Occupation: Painter

Gertrude Bohnert (2 April 1908 – 20 September 1948) was a Swiss painter. Her work was part of the painting event in the art competition at the 1948 Summer Olympics. She was the first wife of the Swiss artist Hans Erni, and she died in a horse-riding accident.
