= Dragan Boltar =

Croatian architect

- Born: 18 March 1913; Trieste, Austria-Hungary
- Died: 16 February 1988 (aged 74); Zagreb, Yugoslavia
- Occupation: Architect

Dragan Boltar (18 March 1913 – 16 February 1988) was a Croatian architect. Graduated from the Technical Faculty in Zagreb in 1936. During World War II, he was head of the technical department of the city of Šibenik. In 1946 he began teaching at the Faculty of Architecture in Zagreb. He realized projects for the airport and university campus in Zagreb.

His work was part of the architecture event in the art competition at the 1948 Summer Olympics.
