= Thurston Williams =

British architect

- Born: 3 February 1924; Bromley, England
- Died: 18 February 1985 (aged 61); Westminster, England
- Occupation: Architect

Thurston Williams (3 February 1924 – 18 February 1985) was a British architect. His work was part of the architecture event in the art competition at the 1948 Summer Olympics.
