= Ásgeir Bjarnþórsson =

Icelandic painter

- Born: 1 April 1899; Álftaneshreppi, Iceland
- Died: 16 December 1987 (aged 88); Reykjavík, Iceland
- Occupation: Painter

Ásgeir Bjarnþórsson (1 April 1899 – 16 December 1987) was an Icelandic painter. His work was part of the painting event in the art competition at the 1948 Summer Olympics.
