= Josephine Cheesman =

British painter

- Born: 13 September 1910; Fontmell Magna, England
- Died: 18 November 1997 (aged 87); London, England
- Occupation: Painter

Josephine Cheesman (13 September 1910 – 18 November 1997) was a British painter. Her work was part of the painting event in the art competition at the 1948 Summer Olympics.
