= Max Ehinger =

Swiss writer

- Born: 22 May 1908; Basel, Switzerland
- Died: 17 July 1974 (aged 66); Basel, Switzerland
- Occupation: Writer

Max Ehinger (22 May 1908 – 17 July 1974) was a Swiss writer. His work was part of the literature event in the art competition at the 1948 Summer Olympics.
