= Edgard Derouet =

French painter (1910–2001)

- Born: 26 October 1910; Saint-Denis-en-Val, France
- Died: 14 October 2001 (aged 90); Eaubonne, France
- Occupation: Painter

Edgard Derouet (26 October 1910 – 14 October 2001) was a French painter. His work was part of the painting event in the art competition at the 1948 Summer Olympics.
