= Filippo Sgarlata =

Italian sculptor

- Born: 24 November 1901; Tunis, Tunisia
- Died: 15 September 1979 (aged 77); Termini Imerese, Italy
- Occupation: Sculptor

Filippo Sgarlata (24 November 1901 – 15 September 1979) was an Italian sculptor. His work was part of the sculpture event in the art competition at the 1948 Summer Olympics.
