= Alfred Rinesch =

Austrian architect (1911–2005)

Olympic medal record

Art competitions
Silver medal – second place	1948 London	Architectural design

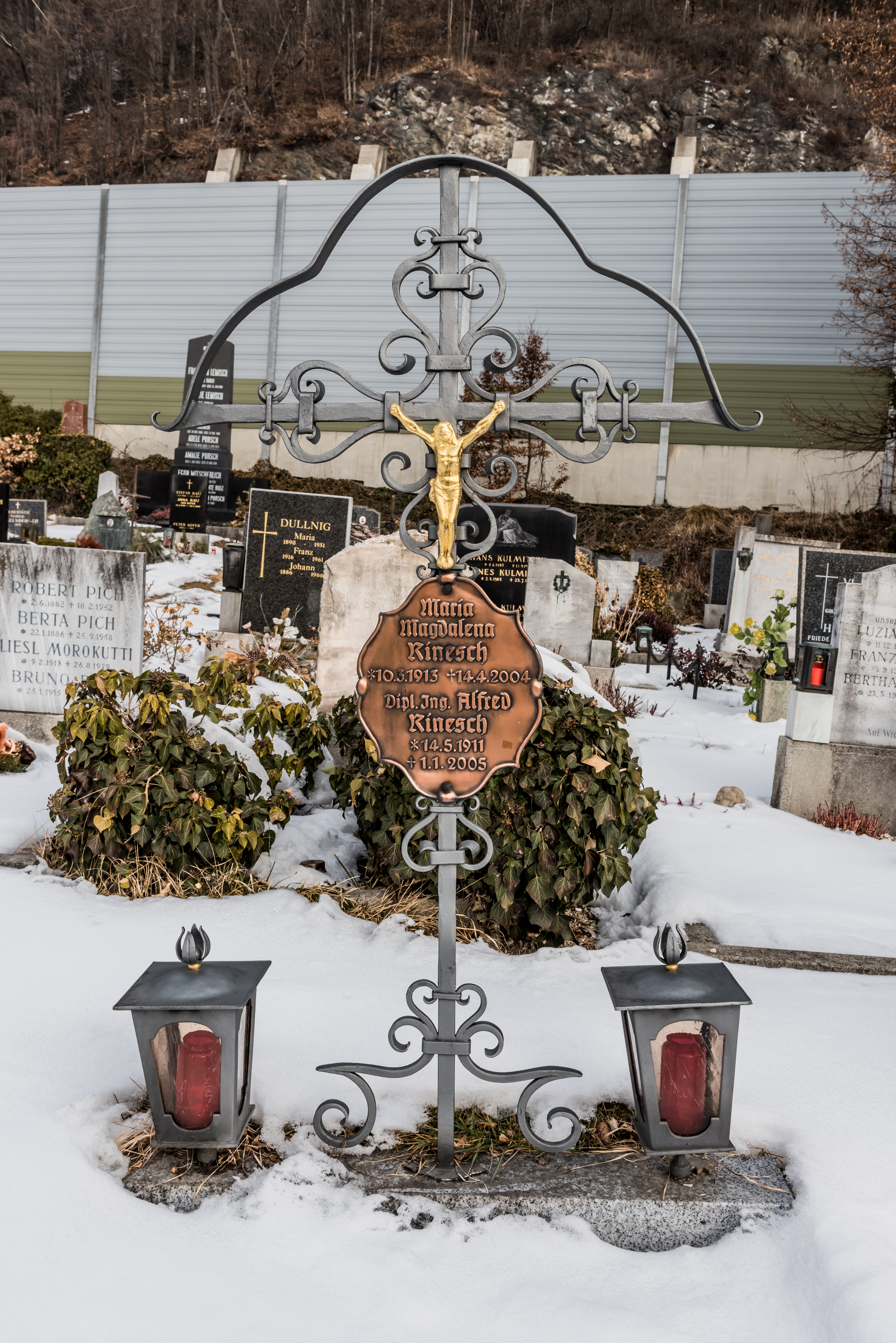
Grave of family Rinesch at the local cemetery, Pörtschach am Wörthersee, Carinthia, Austria

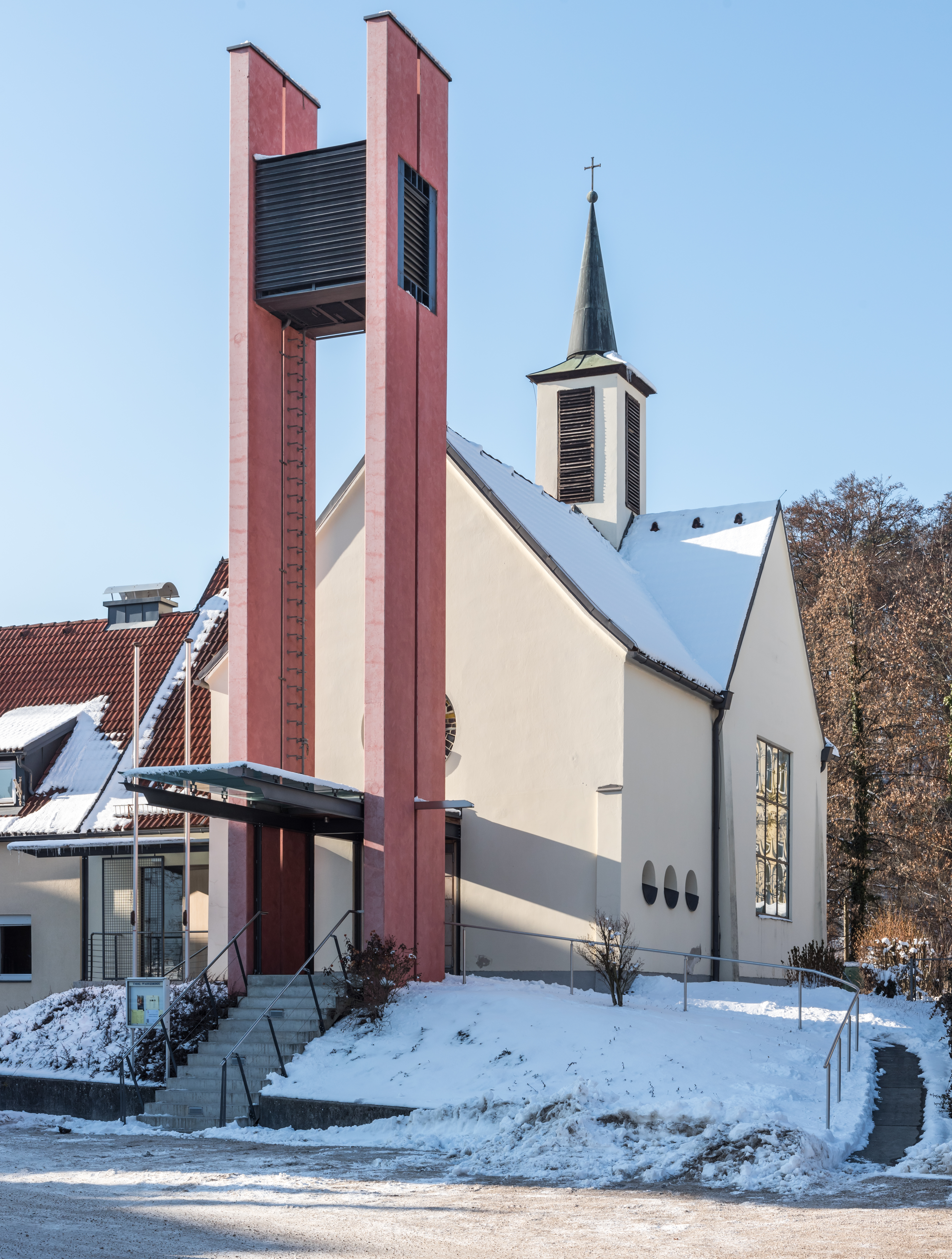
Lutheran Redeemer church on Kirchplatz #8, Poertschach am Wörthersee, Carinthia, Austria

Alfred L. Rinesch (born 14 May 1911 in Vienna, Austria; died 1 January 2005 in Pörtschach am Wörthersee, Austria) was an Austrian architect.

He was married to Maria Magdalena Franziska, Gräfin Hoyos Freiin zu Stichsenstein. Their wedding day was 28 December 1938. In 1948 he won a silver medal in the art competitions of the Olympic Games for his "Wassersportzentrum in Kärnten" ("Water Sports Centre in Carinthia").

== Works ==
- Architectural design for the Lutheran Redeemer church, 1956–1959, in Poertschach am Woerthersee, Carinthia, Austria
