= Filippo Tallone =

Italian sculptor

- Born: 28 July 1902; Turin, Italy
- Died: 11 December 1962 (aged 60); Milan, Italy
- Occupation: Sculptor

Filippo Tallone (28 July 1902 – 11 December 1962) was an Italian sculptor. His work was part of the sculpture event in the art competition at the 1948 Summer Olympics.
