= Phyllis Platt =

British painter (1886–1950)

- Born: 1 July 1886; Gorleston-on-Sea, England
- Died: 11 February 1950 (aged 63); Rye, England
- Occupation: Painter

Phyllis Platt (1 July 1886 – 11 February 1950) was a British painter. Her work was part of the painting event in the art competition at the 1948 Summer Olympics.
