= Juuse Tamminen =

Finnish writer

- Born: 29 November 1888; Ylöjärvi, Finland
- Died: 7 June 1962 (aged 73); Helsinki, Finland
- Occupation: Writer

Juuse Tamminen (29 November 1888 – 7 June 1962) was a Finnish writer. His work was part of the literature event in the art competition at the 1948 Summer Olympics.
