= Miklós Jós =

Hungarian writer

- Born: 17 January 1906; Halič, Austria-Hungary
- Died: 30 April 1990 (aged 84); Cegléd, Hungary
- Occupation: Writer

Miklós Jós (17 January 1906 – 30 April 1990) was a Hungarian writer. His work was part of the literature event in the art competition at the 1948 Summer Olympics.
