= Deirdre Henty-Creer =

Australian painter

- Born: 28 December 1918; Darlinghurst, New South Wales, Australia
- Died: 9 January 2012 (aged 93); London, England
- Occupation: Painter

Deirdre Henty-Creer (28 December 1918 – 9 January 2012) was an Australian painter known for her flower and portrait studies who spent the majority of her career in Britain.

Henty-Creer was privately educated and a self-taught artist. During World War II she worked for the Ministry of Information in London and, in 1941, had a solo exhibition at the Fine Art Society. She also exhibited at the Royal Academy and with the New English Art Club. Several print companies produced reproductions of her work. Henty-Creer represented Britain at the painting event in the art competition at the 1948 Summer Olympics. Her sister, Pam Mellor, was also an artist.
