= Andrzej Jurkiewicz =

Polish painter

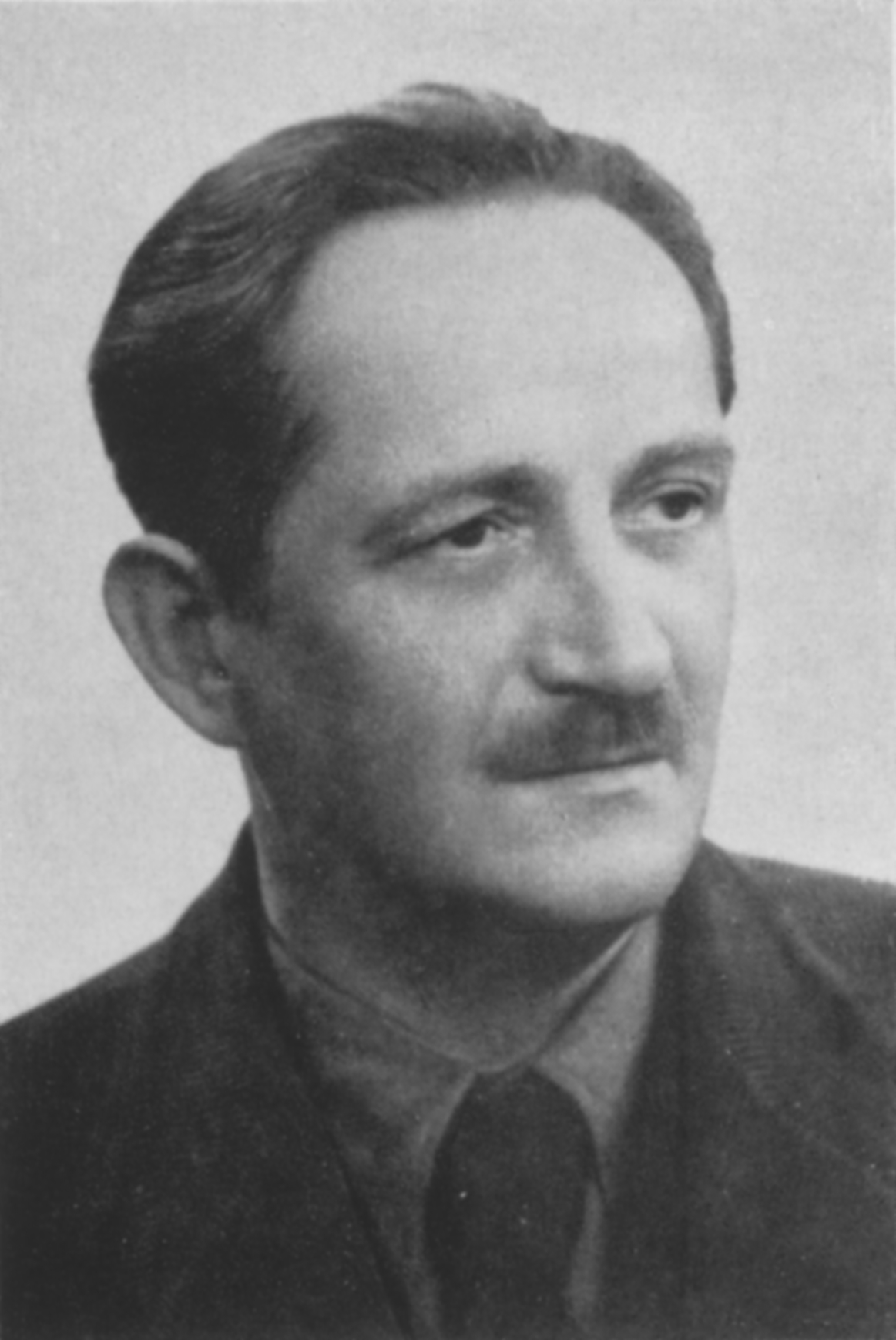
- Andrzej Jurkiewicz (before 1965)
- Born: 29 May 1907; Tlumach, Ukraine
- Died: 2 August 1967 (aged 60); Warsaw, Poland
- Occupation: Painter

Andrzej Jurkiewicz (29 May 1907 – 2 August 1967) was a Polish painter. His work was part of the painting event in the art competition at the 1948 Summer Olympics.
