= Emil Kotrba =

Czech painter (1912–1983)

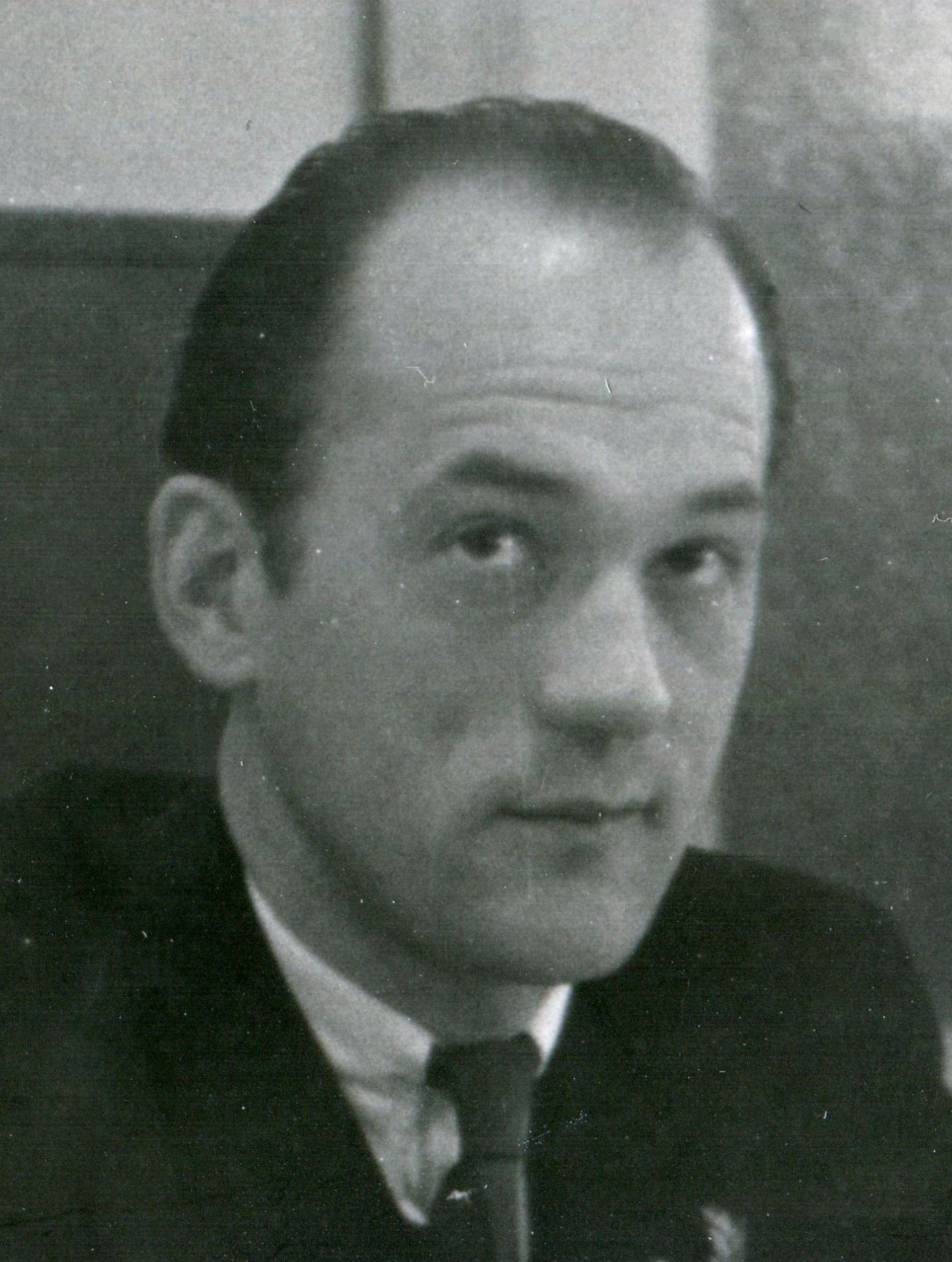
- Born: 22 February 1912; Znojmo, Moravia, Austria-Hungary
- Died: 21 February 1983 (aged 70); Prague, Czechoslovakia
- Occupation: Painter

Emil Kotrba (22 February 1912 – 21 February 1983) was a Czech painter. He specialised in painting horses and became world-renowned in this field. He was also an active horse rider, trainer and race judge.

== Life ==
Emil Kotrba was born on 22 February 1912 in Znojmo. In 1931, he left his hometown and studied at the Academy of Fine Arts in Prague. His mentor became Max Švabinský. His favourite technique was lithography. He had a passion for horses and would go to the veterinary clinic to take their portraits. He actively rode horses as long as his health allowed.

Kotrba's work was part of the painting event in the art competition at the 1948 Summer Olympics. He died on 21 February 1983 in Prague.
