= Chen Hsiao-nan =

Chinese painter

- Born: 15 January 1908; Liyang, China
- Died: 14 October 1993 (aged 85)
- Occupation: Painter

Chen Hsiao-nan (15 January 1908 – 14 October 1993) was a Chinese painter. His work was part of the painting event in the art competition at the 1948 Summer Olympics.
