= Raymond Coulon =

French sculptor

- Born: 19 October 1910; Sayat, France
- Died: 4 February 2007 (aged 96); Paris, France
- Occupation: Sculptor

Raymond Coulon (19 October 1910 – 4 February 2007) was a French sculptor. His work was part of the sculpture event in the art competition at the 1948 Summer Olympics.
