= Alec Pecker =

British painter (1894–1975)

- Born: Alec Maurice Pecker; 2 September 1894; Russia
- Died: 30 March 1975 (aged 80); London, England
- Occupation: Painter

Alec Maurice Pecker (2 September 1894 – 30 March 1975) was a British painter. His work was part of the painting event in the art competition at the 1948 Summer Olympics.
