= William Fisher (painter) =

American painter

- Born: June 17, 1890; Brooklyn, New York, United States
- Died: March 9, 1985 (aged 94); Kennebunkport, Maine, United States
- Occupation: Painter

William Fisher (June 17, 1890 – March 9, 1985) was an American painter. His work was part of the painting event in the art competition at the 1948 Summer Olympics.
