= Lucien Seignol =

French architect

- Born: 13 December 1907; Lyon, France
- Died: 28 August 1994 (aged 86); Paris, France
- Occupation: Architect

Lucien Seignol (13 December 1907 – 28 August 1994) was a French architect. His work was part of the architecture event in the art competition at the 1948 Summer Olympics.
