= Howard Jarvis (painter) =

British painter

- Born: 6 February 1903; Liverpool, England
- Died: 28 June 1964 (aged 61); Liss, England
- Occupation: Painter

Howard Jarvis (6 February 1903 – 28 June 1964) was a British painter. His work was part of the painting event in the art competition at the 1948 Summer Olympics.
