= Marcel Chauvenet =

French sculptor

- Born: 27 June 1906; Perpignan, France
- Died: 21 August 1988 (aged 82); Thouars, France
- Occupation: Sculptor

Marcel Chauvenet (27 June 1906 – 21 August 1988) was a French sculptor. His work was part of the sculpture event in the art competition at the 1948 Summer Olympics.
