= Zhang Anzhi =

Chinese artist (1911–1991)

Personal information
- National team: Republic of China
- Citizenship: Chinese
- Born: 1911 Yangzhou, Jiangsu
- Died: 1991 (aged 79–80)
- Education: Department of Art at Nanjing Central University; University of London
- Occupation: Painter

Sport
- Country: Republic of China
- Sport: Art Competitions
- Event: 1948 Summer Olympics

Zhang Anzhi (1911–1991) was a Chinese painter and Olympian who competed in the art competitions at the 1948 Summer Olympics in London.

== Life and career ==
Zhang Anzhi graduated from Nanjing Central University in 1931, under the guidance of Xu Beihong, and later Lü Fengzi, and continued his studies in 1946 at the University of London. In 1948, he took part in the Olympics, and was later admitted as professor and taught at the Central Academy of Fine Arts in Beijing. He died in 1991, aged 80.

== Publications ==
- A History of Chinese Painting (1992, posthumously)
