= Ciaran Clear =

Irish painter (1920–2000)

- Born: John Patrick Ciarán Clear; 28 February 1920; Dublin, Ireland
- Died: 15 June 2000 (aged 80); Dublin, Ireland
- Occupation: Painter

John Patrick Ciarán Clear (28 February 1920 – 15 June 2000) was an Irish painter known for his moonlight seascapes of Rush, Dublin and the west of Ireland.

== Life ==
Ciaran Clear was born in 1920 in Dublin. His was the only child of Margaret and Edward Clear. The family moved to Rush when Clear was 9, and he lived there for the rest of his life.

Clear was primarily a self taught painter. His work was part of the painting event in the art competition at the 1948 Summer Olympics, and was awarded a bronze medal.

Clear suffered a long illness in the 1950s, after which he decided to become a full time painter. He held his first solo show in the Godwin Gallery, Limerick in 1962. He was a regular exhibitor with the Royal Hibernian Academy, the Dublin Sketching Club, and the Oireachtas Exhibitions. He also exhibited in the United States. His last solo show was at the Gerald Davis Gallery, Dublin in 1999.

In 1963, he co-founded the Fingal Artists Group with Maurice MacGonigal, Fergus O'Ryan, Bea Orpen, Patrick Leonard and Tom Nisbet, holding group exhibitions around Ireland aimed at promoting accessible art.

Clear died in Dublin on 15 June 2000, at the age of 80. Two retrospectives of his work were held in the Daffodil Gallery, Skerries in 2001 and 2003.
