= Éva Földes =

Hungarian writer

Olympic medal record

Art competitions
Bronze medal – third place	1948 London	Epic works

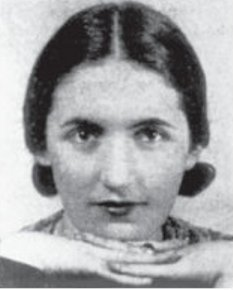

Éva Földes (6 July 1914 – 9 July 1981) was a Hungarian author and Olympic bronze medalist. She was born in Szombathely and died in Balatonalmádi. During the London 1948 Summer Olympics, she competed in the 'epic works' category producing "Der Jugendquell" ("The Well of Youth"), which won her a bronze medal.

During World War II, she was interned in KZ Ravensbrück, KZ Flossenbürg, and KZ Mauthausen but survived.
