= Hans Brandenberger =

Swiss sculptor (1912–2003)

- Born: 28 June 1912; Sumbawa, Dutch East Indies
- Died: 26 March 2003 (aged 90); Zürich, Switzerland
- Occupation: Sculptor

Hans Brandenberger (28 June 1912 – 26 March 2003) was a Swiss sculptor, and medallist. His work was part of the sculpture event in the art competition at the 1948 Summer Olympics.

== Biography ==
Hans Brandenberger was born on the Lesser Sunda Island of Sumbawa in what was then the Dutch East Indies, now Indonesia, and grew up in Timor.

He suddenly became famous for his soldier monument "Wehrbereitschaft", which became the most symbolic monument of the 1939 Swiss National Exhibition ("Landi"). The statue stood at the entrance to the hall of honor of the Swiss army pavilion on Höhenstrasse and showed the transformation from peaceful citizen to combat-ready citizen. The slogans "Attack everyone again" and "Every Swiss is liable for military service" were displayed in the memorial hall. The monument is said to have moved people, and flowers were laid in front of it. The statue was made of plaster and is now lost.
