= Benoît Bickel =

Swiss writer

- Born: 2 September 1900; Sion, Switzerland
- Died: 10 December 1986 (aged 86)
- Occupation: Writer

Benoît Bickel (2 September 1900 – 10 December 1986) was a Swiss writer. His work was part of the literature event in the art competition at the 1948 Summer Olympics.
