= Mario Ghedina =

Italian architect

- Born: 1 March 1909; Cortina d'Ampezzo, Italy
- Died: 11 September 1974 (aged 65)
- Occupation: Architect

Mario Ghedina (1 March 1909 – 11 September 1974) was an Italian architect. His work was part of the architecture event in the art competition at the 1948 Summer Olympics.
