= Renato Giovanelli =

Italian architect

- Born: 23 June 1923; Rome, Italy
- Died: 30 October 1999 (aged 76)
- Occupation: Architect

Renato Giovanelli (23 June 1923 – 30 October 1999) was an Italian architect. His work was part of the architecture event in the art competition at the 1948 Summer Olympics.
