= Jerzy Bandura =

Polish sculptor

- Born: 14 November 1915; Chabówka, Poland
- Died: 19 October 1987 (aged 71); Kraków, Poland
- Occupation: Sculptor

Jerzy Bandura (14 November 1915 – 19 October 1987) was a Polish sculptor. A poster he designed in 1947 won him an international award from the United Nations. His work entitled "Crawl" was also part of the sculpture event in the art competition at the 1948 Summer Olympics. In 1945, he taught sculpture at the Academy of Fine Arts in Kraków, becoming a professor in 1959. A work he completed in 1960 was described as one of the "most outstanding Polish spatial and architectural monuments".

== Gallery ==
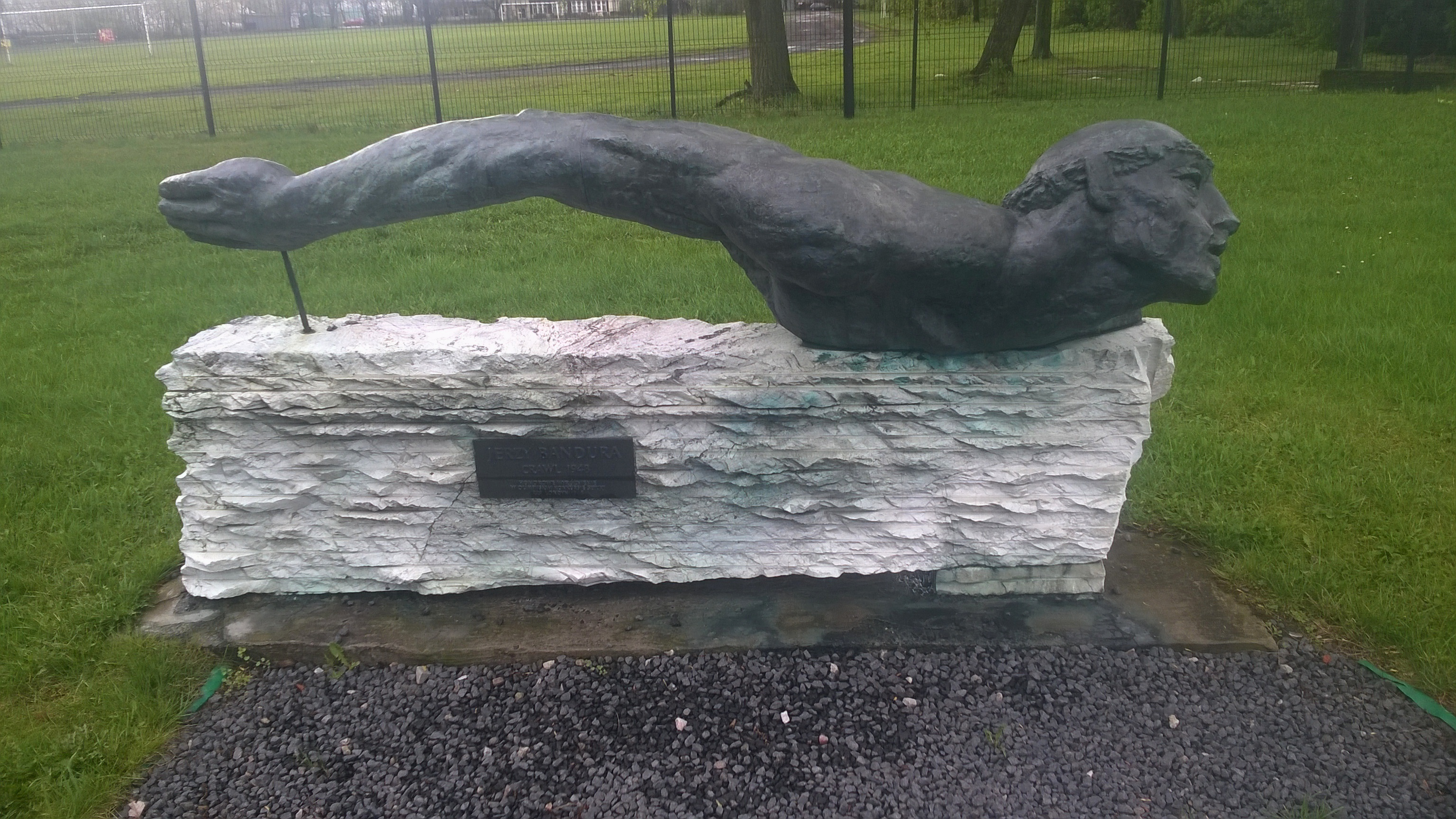
"Crawl", for the 1948 Summer Olympics

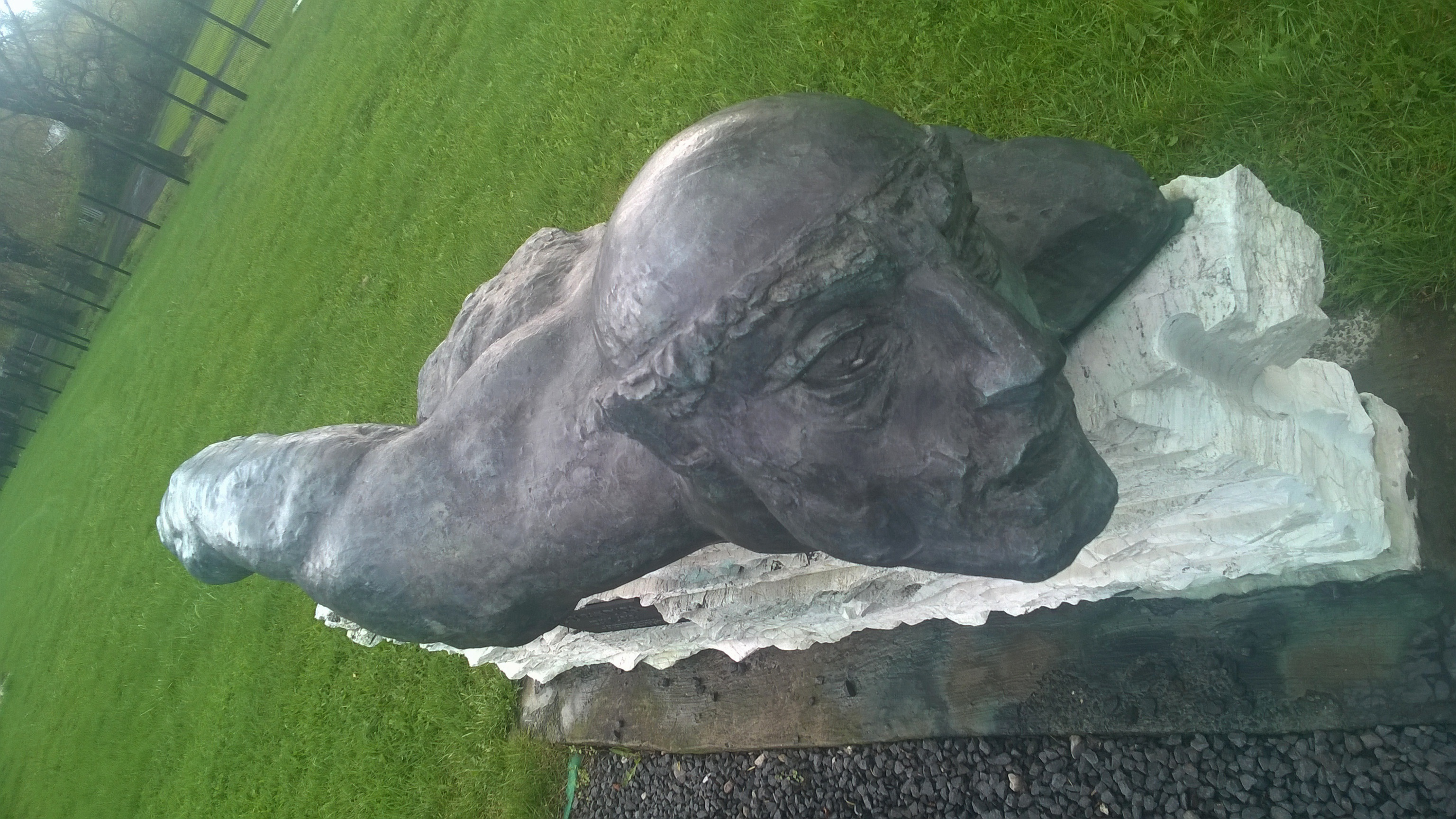
"Crawl", for the 1948 Summer Olympics
