= Reginald Till =

British painter

- Born: 17 September 1895
- Died: 1978 (aged 82–83); Poole, England
- Occupation: Painter

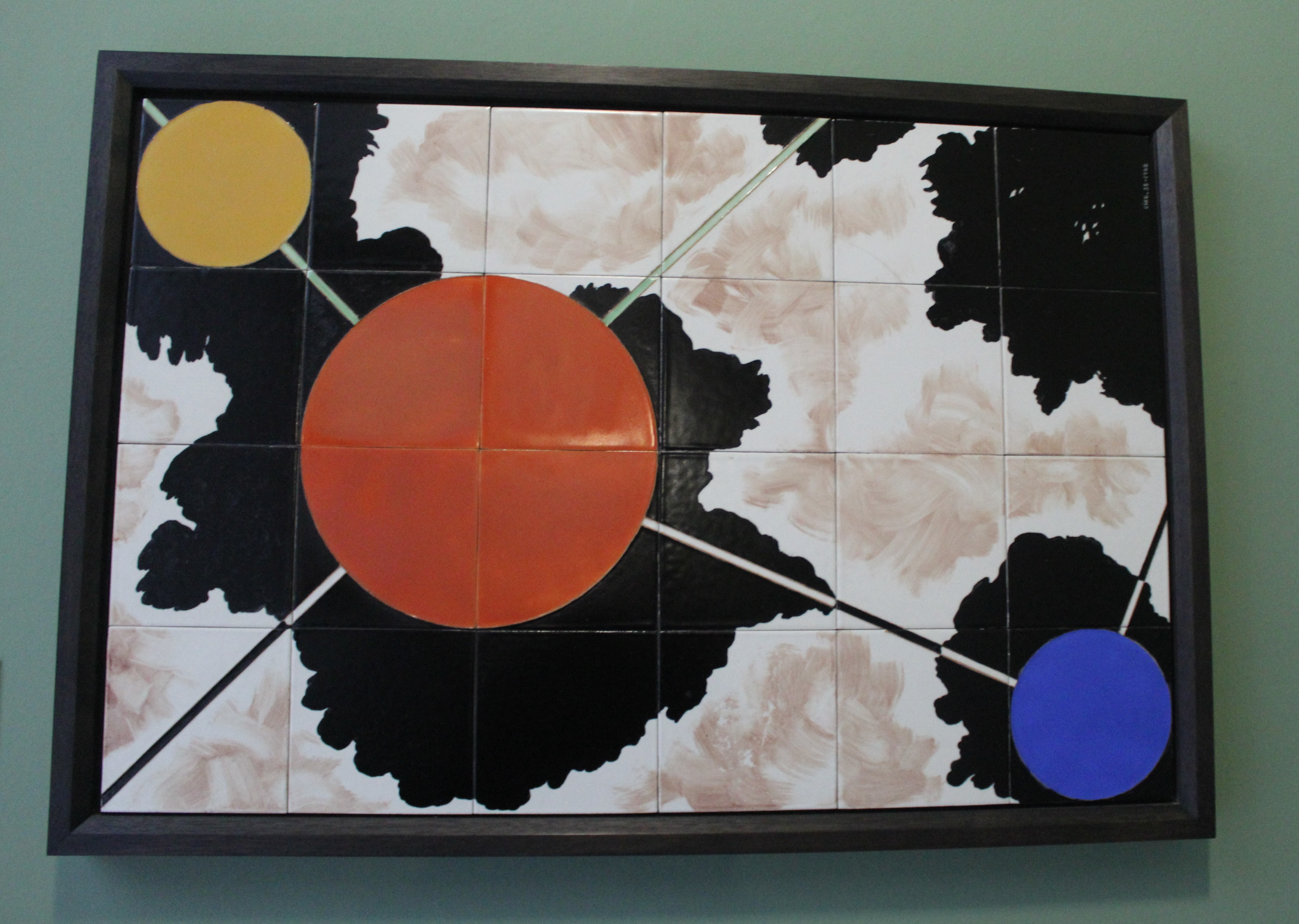
Zinc hydroxide panel of tiles in the V&A, designed by Till

Reginald Till (17 September 1895 – 1978) was a British painter. His work was part of the painting event in the art competition at the 1948 Summer Olympics.
