= Charles Terry Pledge =

British architect

- Born: 9 March 1887; Camberwell, England
- Died: 31 March 1962 (aged 75); West Wickham, England
- Occupation: Architect

Charles Terry Pledge (9 March 1887 – 31 March 1962) was a British architect. His work was part of the architecture event in the art competition at the 1948 Summer Olympics.
