= Felice Ludovisi =

Italian painter

Felice Ludovisi (27 August 1917 – 2 April 2012) was born in Viterbo in 1917. He studied at the Art Academy in Rome. After obtaining the diploma of artistic maturity and teaching qualification, he graduated from the Faculty of Architecture at the University La Sapienza of Rome.

After the difficult years of war were over, he took part in a joint exhibition with the most prestigious names in the Roman School: Greco, Purificato, Guttuso, Cesetti, De Chirico.

His first solo exhibition, at the gallery San Marco in Rome, dates back to 1946. His work was also part of the painting event in the art competition at the 1948 Summer Olympics. Subsequently, his solo exhibitions were set up in all major Italian cities. The most important are: the 1968 retrospective exhibition at the Palazzo Barberini in Rome; the retrospective exhibition "Forty years of painting by Felice Ludovisi" organized by the Lazio Region in 1987 at the Palazzo Venezia in Rome; the retrospective exhibition "The long path to the painting of Felix Ludovisi " organized in 2007 by the Municipality of Viterbo at the Rocca Albornoz to celebrate the ninety years of the artist.

The artist has performed works in many public buildings and churches. One of these is the big Via Crucis in the Church of the Risen Christ Bomarzo.

He has exhibited at the Venice Biennale and the Quadrennial of Rome, at the Victoria and Albert Museum in London, at the Salon d'Automne in Paris, at the Salon International de l'Aeronautique de l'Espace, Le Bourget-Paris and at the headquarters of the Group Augusta Philadelphia.

He held the chair of painting at the Finch College Museum of Art, New York. He taught painting for several years and directed the Academies of Fine Arts of Foggia, Frosinone and Rome. He holds the Medaille d'Or de l'Academie de Devoument de France, and Gold Medal of culture and art with the appointment of the Italian President of the Republic. He was the consultant to the Pontifical Commission for Sacred Art Center and a member of the Pontifical Academy of Art of the Virtuosi al Pantheon and Knight Grand Cross of Merit of the Republic.

In 2005 he exposed at the Fondazione Opera Campana Memorial in Rovereto, on which the artist has given several works dedicated to peace. Felice Ludovisi has painted scenographies in major theatres including the opera house in Rome and his works are in numerous national museums. Italian painter.
