= Jean Démaret =

French architect (1897–1967)

- Born: 6 September 1897; Charleville-Mézières, France
- Died: 15 May 1967 (aged 69); Paris, France
- Occupation: Architect

Jean Démaret (6 September 1897 – 15 May 1967) was a French architect. His work was part of the architecture event in the art competition at the 1948 Summer Olympics.
