= John Auld (painter) =

British painter (1914–1996)

- Born: John Leslie Miller Auld; 21 January 1914; Belfast, Northern Ireland
- Died: 1996 (aged 81–82)
- Occupation: Painter

John Leslie Miller Auld (21 January 1914 – 1996) was a British painter. His work was part of the painting event in the art competition at the 1948 Summer Olympics.
