= Franjo Neidhardt =

Croatian architect

- Born: 14 January 1907; Zagreb, Austria-Hungary
- Died: 20 November 1984 (aged 77); Zagreb, Yugoslavia
- Occupation: Architect

Franjo Neidhardt (14 January 1907 – 20 November 1984) was a Croatian architect. His work was part of the architecture event in the art competition at the 1948 Summer Olympics. He is the father of Velimir Neidhardt, also a prominent architect.
