= Ferdinand Schell =

Swiss writer

- Born: 16 June 1900; Schwyz, Switzerland
- Died: 4 January 1972 (aged 71); Salzburg, Austria
- Occupation: Writer

Ferdinand Schell (16 June 1900 – 4 January 1972) was a Swiss writer. His work was part of the literature event in the art competition at the 1948 Summer Olympics.
