= Alessandro Manzo =

Italian sculptor

- Born: 24 October 1913; Termini Imerese, Italy
- Died: 29 July 1994 (aged 80); Palermo, Italy
- Occupation: Sculptor

Alessandro Manzo (24 October 1913 – 29 July 1994) was an Italian sculptor. His work was part of the sculpture event in the art competition at the 1948 Summer Olympics.
