= Edmund Moiret =

Austrian sculptor

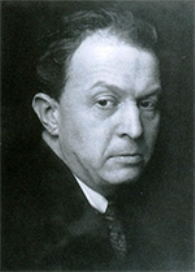
- Born: 2 March 1883; Budapest, Austria-Hungary
- Died: 12 December 1966 (aged 83); Vienna, Austria
- Occupation: Sculptor

Edmund Moiret (2 March 1883 – 12 December 1966) was an Austrian sculptor. His work was part of the sculpture event in the art competition at the 1948 Summer Olympics.
