= Vera Brookman =

British painter (1908–1964)

- Born: 10 July 1908; Portsmouth, England
- Died: 14 December 1964 (aged 55–56); Welwyn Garden City, England
- Education: Royal Academy of Arts
- Occupation: Painter

Vera Eveline Brookman (10 July 1908 – 14 December 1964) was a British painter and book illustrator.

Brookman painted landscapes and portraits. She was awarded the Landseer scholarship, studied at the Royal Academy of Arts from 1929 to 1934, and exhibited at the Royal Academy from 1932.

Brookman's work was part of the painting event in the art competition at the 1948 Summer Olympics in London.
