= Michael Drobil =

Austrian sculptor

- Born: 19 September 1877; Vienna, Austria-Hungary
- Died: 12 September 1958 (aged 80); Vienna, Austria
- Occupation: Sculptor

Michael Drobil (19 September 1877 – 12 September 1958) was an Austrian sculptor. His work was part of the sculpture event in the art competition at the 1948 Summer Olympics.

Drobil was a friend of the philosopher Ludwig Wittgenstein, having met him while they were both interned at a prisoner of war camp in Monte Cassino, Italy.
