= Louis De Marquevic =

French painter (1886–1973)

- Born: 4 February 1886; Lviv, Ukraine
- Died: 7 April 1973 (aged 87); Paris, France
- Occupation: Painter

Louis De Marquevic (4 February 1886 – 7 April 1973) was a French painter. His work was part of the painting event in the art competition at the 1948 Summer Olympics.
