= Hans Jaksch =

Austrian architect

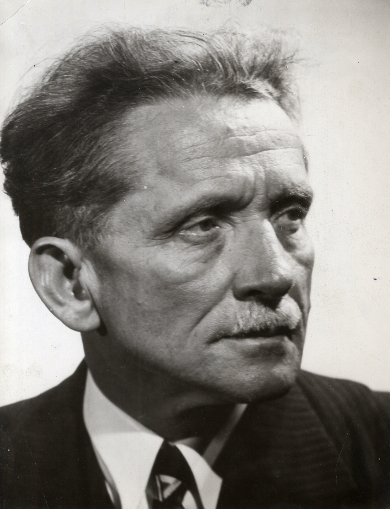
- Jaksch in 1943
- Born: 29 October 1879; Dubnice, Austria-Hungary
- Died: 8 January 1970 (aged 90); Vienna, Austria
- Occupation: Architect

Hans Jaksch (29 October 1879 – 8 January 1970) was an Austrian architect. His work was part of the architecture event in the art competition at the 1948 Summer Olympics.
