= Bettina Somers =

Canadian painter

- Born: 17 July 1904; Bloemfontein, Orange River Colony
- Died: 22 May 1989 (aged 84); Summerland, British Columbia, Canada
- Occupation: Painter

Bettina Somers (17 July 1904 – 22 May 1989) was a Canadian painter. Her work was part of the painting event in the art competition at the 1948 Summer Olympics.
