= Hervé Morvan =

French painter

- Born: 18 March 1917; Plougastel-Daoulas, France
- Died: 1 April 1980 (aged 63); Paris, France
- Occupation: Painter

Hervé Morvan (18 March 1917 – 1 April 1980) was a French painter. His work was part of the painting event in the art competition at the 1948 Summer Olympics.
