= Gustaf Nordahl =

Swedish sculptor

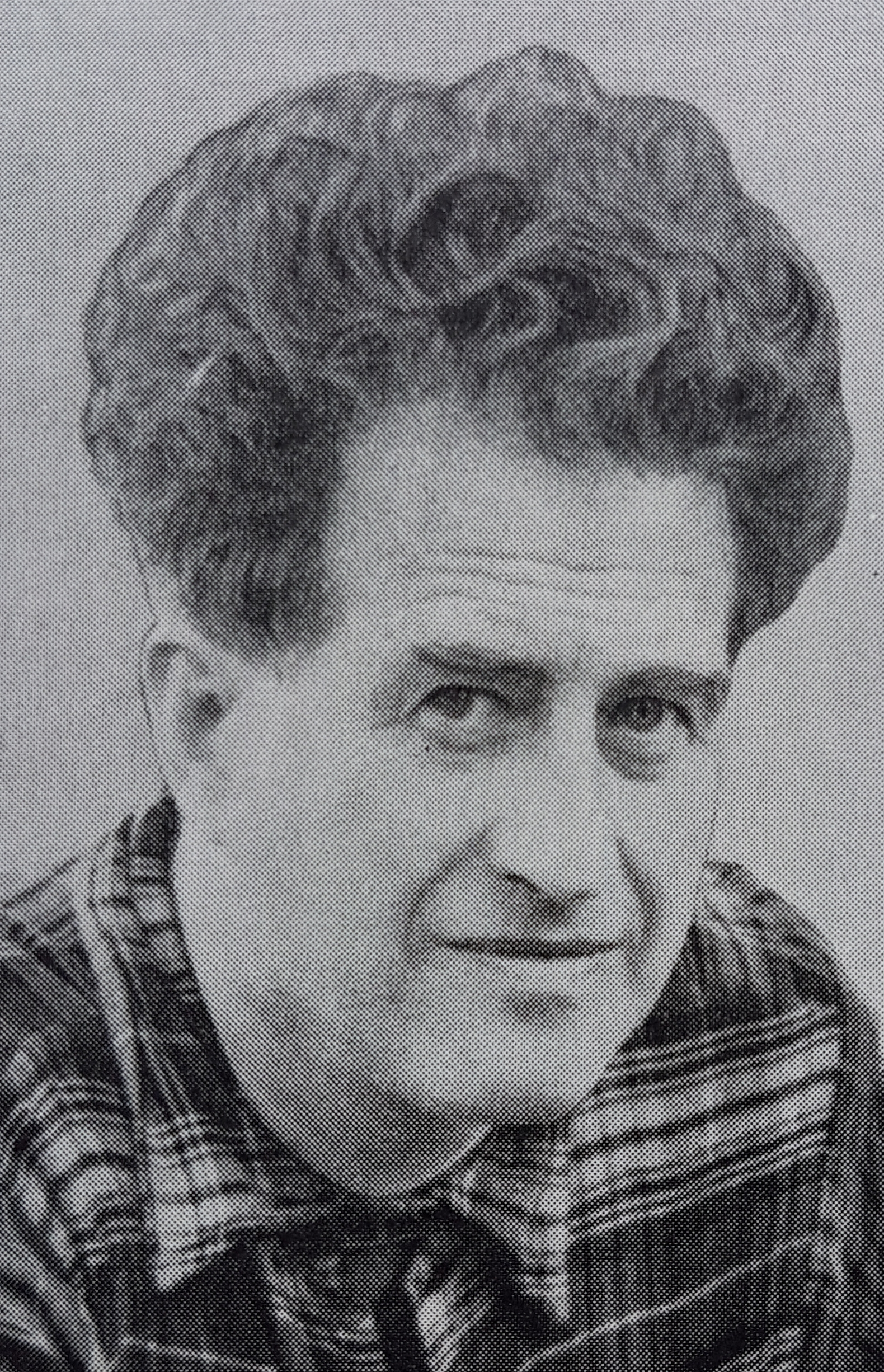
- Born: 10 August 1903; Helsingborg, Sweden
- Died: 10 November 1992 (aged 89); Saltsjöbaden, Sweden
- Occupation: Sculptor

Gustaf Nordahl (10 August 1903 – 10 November 1992) was a Swedish sculptor. His work was part of the sculpture event in the art competition at the 1948 Summer Olympics, winning a gold medal.
