= Karin Jarl-Sakellarios =

Austrian sculptor (1885–1948)

- Born: 6 October 1885; Vienna, Austria-Hungary
- Died: 20 November 1948 (aged 63); Vienna, Austria
- Occupation: Sculptor

Karin Jarl-Sakellarios (6 October 1885 – 20 November 1948) was an Austrian sculptor. Her work was part of the sculpture event in the art competition at the 1948 Summer Olympics.
