= Carlo Di Maria =

Italian architect (born 1904)

- Born: 12 December 1904; Palermo, Italy
- Occupation: Architect

Carlo Di Maria (born 12 December 1904, date of death unknown) was an Italian architect. His work was part of the architecture event in the art competition at the 1948 Summer Olympics.

His architectural work included the design for the Palazzo della Regione Siciliana in Palermo, where the institutions of Sicily's regional council are seated, as well as the Istituto Nazionale della Previdenza Sociale (INPS) in Rome, which houses the offices of Italy's national social security system.

Carlo Di Maria was the son of Eugenio Di Maria, a general of the Italian Army.
