= Philip Greene =

Irish football broadcaster

- Born: 2 October 1920; Broadstone, Dublin, Ireland
- Died: 15 May 2011 (aged 90)
- Occupation: Association football commentator
- Employer: Raidió Teilifís Éireann
- Known for: Longstanding Football commentator
- Title: Voice of Football

Philip Greene (2 October 1920 – 15 May 2011) was a longstanding Irish sports radio broadcaster and football commentator on RTÉ Radio, as well as being a former Head of Sport at Raidió Teilifís Éireann (RTÉ). He was also a writer, and his work was part of the literature event in the art competition at the 1948 Summer Olympics.

== Biography ==
Born in the Broadstone in Dublin, Greene came to prominence in the 1940s and gave his first live commentary on Ireland's 1–0 defeat by Argentina at Dalymount Park in 1951. He also covered the League of Ireland for the Evening Press and covered many international events including the European Athletics Championships in Stockholm in 1956 and the 1972 Olympic Games. In a broadcasting career spanning four decades, he earned the title of 'the voice of Irish football'.

He retired from RTÉ in 1985.

Despite his father being a Bohs fan Greene loved The Hoops from the age of nine and as a big Shamrock Rovers fan, he was known universally as Philip Green-and-White. Whether true or not, the story is that he reported that "the score is 2-2, in favour of Shamrock Rovers" in a match. He died on 15 May 2011 aged 90.
