= Russell Reeve =

British painter

- Born: 3 June 1895; Hethersett, England
- Died: 1 April 1970 (aged 74); Samford, England
- Occupation: Painter

Russell Reeve (3 June 1895 – 1 April 1970) was a British painter. His work was part of the painting event in the art competition at the 1948 Summer Olympics.
