= Lorle Herdey-von Savageri =

Austrian architect

- Born: 28 October 1923; Graz, Austria
- Died: 1 October 2008 (aged 84)
- Occupation: Architect

Lorle Herdey-von Savageri (28 October 1923 – 1 October 2008) was an Austrian architect. Her work was part of the architecture event in the art competition at the 1948 Summer Olympics.
