= Philip Rooney =

Irish writer (1907–1962)

- Born: Philip Francis Rooney; 26 March 1907; Collooney, Ireland
- Died: 6 March 1962 (aged 54); Dublin, Ireland
- Occupation: Writer

Philip Francis Rooney (26 March 1907 – 6 March 1962) was an Irish writer. His work was part of the literature event in the art competition at the 1948 Summer Olympics.

== Early life ==
Rooney was born in Collooney, Sligo, Ireland to school teachers Henry Rooney and Margaret Rooney (née Mulligan). Hs siblings were Catherine Mary Monica, Michael Theobold, Patrick Joseph. His education began at Camphill school, Collooney, where his parents were National teachers.He later attended Mungret College.

== Career ==
Rooney married Marion Josephine Patricia, Rainey at the Roman Catholic Church of the University, Dublin on July 26, 1933. Rooney worked as a bank clerk until the success of his first novel All out to win in 1935. From there, he continued to publish his works, sometimes under the name 'Frank Phillips'. He also worked in print journalism and broadcasting. For some time he was a radio critic for The Irish Times, before he moved to Radio Éireann (now Raidió Teilifís Éireann). In 1947 Rooney was named assistant to the head of general features of Radio Éireann, but decided to split his time between that and the BBC while continuing his career as a novelist.

His entry for the 1948 Summer Olympics was an excerpt from his novel Captain Boycott, which had been published in 1946.

Rooney was later the head of features for the Irish New Agency, before he rejoined Radio Éireann in 1953 as features editor and scriptwriter until 1961. When Telefís Éireann opened that year, Rooney was transferred to its drama department as chief script-editor.

== Later life and death ==
Rooney died in Dublin on 6 March 1962, at the age of 54.

== In popular culture ==
Rooney's novel Captain Boycott was adapted for the screen in a film of the same name in 1947.
