= Cyril Shiner =

British painter

- Born: 30 April 1908; Birmingham, England
- Died: 24 May 1989 (aged 81); Preston, England
- Occupation: Painter

Cyril James Shiner (30 April 1908 – 24 May 1989) was a British painter. His work was part of the painting event in the art competition at the 1948 Summer Olympics.

== Life ==
Shiner was born in Birmingham, and attended Mossley Road Junior Art School. He became a silversmith by profession, a pupil of Bernard Cuzner at Birmingham Central School of Art. He was also an industrial designer, an art teacher, retiring in 1970, and a member of the Birmingham Art Circle during the 1930s. He married the artist and illustrator Eleanor Joyce Bliss.

One of Shiner's works was the trophy for the winner of the King's Vase race at Royal Ascot 1940. The race was cancelled because of wartime conditions, and the trophy was repurposed as the Dunkirk Cup, winning a competition, and commemorating the naval action of the Dunkirk evacuation of late May and early June of that year. It was auctioned in July for the benefit of the Red Cross, being purchased by Almeric Paget, 1st Baron Queenborough.
