= Mans Meijer =

Dutch painter

- Born: 15 September 1916; Sloten, Netherlands
- Died: 1 December 2011 (aged 95); Wassenaar, Netherlands
- Occupation: Painter

Mans Meijer (15 September 1916 – 1 December 2011) was a Dutch painter. His work was part of the painting event in the art competition at the 1948 Summer Olympics.
