= Wilhelm Kaufmann =

Austrian painter

- Born: 25 May 1895; Vienna, Austria-Hungary
- Died: 14 February 1975 (aged 79); Vienna, Austria
- Occupation: Painter

Wilhelm Kaufmann (25 May 1895 – 14 February 1975) was an Austrian painter. His work was part of the painting event in the art competition at the 1948 Summer Olympics.

== Biography ==
At the age of 16, Kaufmann became the youngest student admitted to the Academy of Fine Arts in Vienna, studying under Rudolf Bacher. During World War I, he served for three years and was awarded the Austro-Hungarian Golden Cross of Merit for his military service on the Russian-Albanian front.

Following the war, Kaufmann pursued a career as a freelance artist, becoming actively involved in Vienna's art scene. He exhibited with the Vienna Secession and was a member of the Sonderbund Österreichischer Künstler, a progressive artist group. In 1927, he joined the Hagenbund, another prominent modernist association. Both organizations were dissolved after Austria's annexation into Nazi Germany in 1938. Kaufmann faced a professional ban during the Nazi regime and was forced into labor as an unskilled worker in a gear factory until 1945.

After World War II, Kaufmann played an active role in re-establishing Vienna's art community. From 1945 to 1956, he led the painting section of the Professional Association of Visual Artists and took part in the antifascist exhibition "Never forget!" in Vienna in 1946. That same year, he rejoined the Vienna Secession. In 1948, Kaufmann received a municipal commission to paint portraits of Olympic javelin champion Herma Bauma. He was appointed professor in 1949 and joined the Vienna Visual Artists Association in 1950.

His notable accolades include an Honorary Diploma for Painting and Graphics at the 1952 Helsinki Olympic Games, where his works Skier, Ice Hockey, and Soccer Scene (Indian ink) were displayed, alongside an oil painting entitled Soccer.

Wilhelm Kaufmann died in 1956 from complications related to pneumonia.

== Style ==
Kaufmann's artistic approach emphasized outdoor painting and primarily utilized gouache, watercolor, and ink. In his native land, Kaufmann famously captured a small number of vivid landscapes of cities like Salzburg, Vienna, and Graz alongside his more common pastoral scenes. His post-war works frequently depicted scenes of sports and daily life, reflecting his fascination with movement and dynamism. Kaufmann himself enjoyed speed skating and table tennis.
