= Edith Marion Scales =

British painter (1892–1967)

- Born: 23 May 1892; Newark, England
- Died: 28 October 1967 (aged 75); Overstrand, England
- Occupation: Painter

Edith Marion Scales (23 May 1892 – 28 October 1967) was a British painter. She was born at Newark in Nottinghamshire and studied at Lincoln High School before training at the Nottingham School of Art. Throughout her career she exhibited at the Royal Academy in London, with the Royal Institute of Painters in Water Colours, the Royal Institute of Oil Painters and at the Paris Salon. Her work was part of the painting event in the art competition at the 1948 Summer Olympics. The Museum of London holds examples of her watercolours.
