= Alfred Gerstenbrand =

Austrian painter (1881–1977)

- Born: 18 February 1881; Vienna, Austria-Hungary
- Died: 7 February 1977 (aged 95); Melk, Austria
- Occupation: Painter

Alfred Gerstenbrand (18 February 1881 – 7 January 1977) was an Austrian painter. His work was part of the art competitions at the 1936 Summer Olympics and the 1948 Summer Olympics.
