= Victor Coverley-Price =

British painter

- Born: 31 January 1901; Winchester, England
- Died: 1 October 1988 (aged 87); Cirencester, England
- Occupation: Painter

Victor Coverley-Price (31 January 1901 – 1 October 1988) was a British painter. His work was part of the painting event in the art competition at the 1948 Summer Olympics.
