= Robert Norgate (sculptor) =

Canadian sculptor

- Born: 18 June 1920; Toronto, Ontario, Canada
- Died: 24 September 1956 (aged 36); Toronto, Ontario, Canada
- Occupation: Sculptor

Robert Norgate (18 June 1920 – 24 September 1956) was a Canadian sculptor. His work was part of the sculpture event in the art competition at the 1948 Summer Olympics.
