= Omero Taddeini =

Italian sculptor (1901–1978)

- Born: Omero Archimede Cleomene Alfonso Paradiso Taddeini; 15 July 1901; Montespertoli, Kingdom of Italy
- Died: 30 September 1978 (aged 77); Rome, Italy
- Occupation: Sculptor

Omero Taddeini (15 July 1901 – 30 September 1978) was an Italian sculptor. His work was part of the sculpture event in the art competition at the 1936 Summer Olympics.
