= Jan Ślusarczyk =

Polish sculptor

- Born: 20 November 1903; Bąkowa Góra, Poland
- Died: 31 August 1980 (aged 76); Warsaw, Poland
- Occupation: Sculptor

Jan Ślusarczyk (20 November 1903 – 31 August 1980) was a Polish sculptor. His work was part of the sculpture event in the art competition at the 1948 Summer Olympics.
