= Piotr Ślusarczyk =

Polish politician

member of Sejm 2005-2007
- In office 25 September 2005 – 2007

Personal details
- Born: 24 August 1979 (age 46)
- Party: League of Polish Families

Piotr Jan Ślusarczyk (born 24 August 1979 in Legnica) is a Polish politician. He was elected to the Sejm on 25 September 2005, getting 7863 votes in one Legnica district as a candidate from the League of Polish Families list.

== See also ==
- List of Polish Sejm members from 2005 to 2007
