= Ekke Ozlberger =

Austrian painter

- Born: 1 July 1891; Trieste, Austria-Hungary
- Died: 30 June 1963 (aged 71); Vienna, Austria
- Occupation: Painter

Ekke Ozlberger (1 July 1891 – 30 June 1963) was an Austrian landscape artist, nude painter, and graphic artist. His work was part of the art competitions at the 1936 Summer Olympics and the 1948 Summer Olympics.
