= Paul Daxhelet =

Belgian painter

- Born: 25 November 1905; Huy, Belgium
- Died: 3 October 1993 (aged 87); Liège, Belgium
- Occupation: Painter

Paul Daxhelet (25 November 1905, Huy – 3 October 1993, Liège) was a Belgian painter. His work was part of the art competitions at the 1936 Summer Olympics and the 1948 Summer Olympics.
