= Gijs Kramer =

Dutch painter

- Born: 21 November 1905; Zeist, Netherlands
- Died: 9 December 2001 (aged 96); Rijswijk, Netherlands
- Occupation: Painter

Gijs Kramer (21 November 1905 – 9 December 2001) was a Dutch painter. His work was part of the art competitions at the 1936 Summer Olympics and the 1948 Summer Olympics.
