= Karl Stemolak =

Austrian sculptor

- Born: 8 November 1875; Graz, Austria-Hungary
- Died: 14 April 1954 (aged 78); Vienna, Austria
- Occupation: Sculptor

Karl Stemolak (8 November 1875 – 14 April 1954) was an Austrian sculptor. His work was part of the art competitions at the 1936 Summer Olympics and the 1948 Summer Olympics.
