= Adrienne Jouclard =

French painter

- Born: 4 September 1882; Onville, France
- Died: 14 December 1972 (aged 90); Paris, France
- Occupation: Painter

Adrienne Jouclard (4 September 1882 – 14 December 1972) was a French painter. Her work was part of the art competitions at the 1932 Summer Olympics and the 1948 Summer Olympics.
