= Karl-Maria May =

Austrian painter (1886–1963)

- Born: 20 May 1886; Vienna, Austria-Hungary
- Died: 20 March 1963 (aged 76); Vienna, Austria
- Occupation: Painter

Karl-Maria May (20 May 1886 – 20 March 1963) was an Austrian painter. His work was part of the art competitions at the 1936 Summer Olympics and the 1948 Summer Olympics.
