= Corrado Mancioli =

Italian painter

- Born: 23 June 1904; Rome, Italy
- Died: 20 September 1968 (aged 64); Rome, Italy
- Occupation: Painter

Corrado Mancioli (23 June 1904 – 20 September 1968) was an Italian painter. His work was part of the art competitions at the 1936 Summer Olympics and the 1948 Summer Olympics.
