= Karl Borschke =

Austrian painter

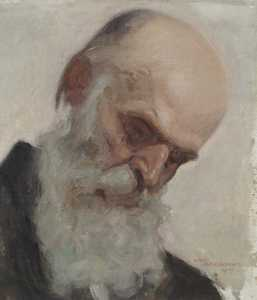
- Karl Borschke in 1911
- Born: 11 June 1886; Vienna, Austria-Hungary
- Died: 14 July 1941 (aged 55); Vienna, Austria
- Occupation: Painter

Karl Borschke (11 June 1886 – 14 July 1941) was an Austrian painter. His work was part of the painting event in the art competition at the 1936 Summer Olympics.
