= Deaths in January 1985 =

The following is a list of notable deaths in January 1985.

Entries for each day are listed alphabetically by surname. A typical entry lists information in the following sequence:

- Name, age, country of citizenship at birth, subsequent country of citizenship (if applicable), reason for notability, cause of death (if known), and reference.

== January 1985 ==
=== 1 ===
- William Ernest Bowman, 73, English writer and engineer.
- Sigerson Clifford, 71, Irish poet and playwright.
- Herb Coleman, 61, American football player.
- Aristos Constantinou, 40, Cypriot-British fashion designer (Ariella), shot.
- Raoul Pene Du Bois, 70, American costume designer and set designer, stroke.
- Herbert Hambleton, 88, British footballer and soldier.
- Bill Henry, 60, American basketball player.
- Rodolfo Mayer, 74, Brazilian actor.
- Jim Milburn, 65, English footballer.
- Hermann Reutter, 84, German pianist and composer.
- Alice B. Russell, 95, American actress and film producer.
- Herbert M. Shelton, 89, American alternative medicine advocate, Parkinson's disease.
- Cecile Vashaw, 75, American composer.
- Jakob Vogt, 82, German Olympic weightlifter (1928).
- Vladimir Weisberg, 60, Soviet painter.

=== 2 ===
- Sir Basil Bartlett, 79, British actor and screenwriter.
- Robert E. Cushman Jr., 70, American general and CIA official, heart attack.
- Jacques de Lacretelle, 96, French novelist.
- Gabriel Elorde, 49, Filipino boxer, lung cancer.
- Ted Jefferies, 76, American football player and coach.
- Clarence John Laughlin, 79, American photographer.

=== 3 ===
- Lucien Cailliet, 93, French-American composer.
- Eckhard Christian, 77, German general.
- Norbert Hougardy, 75, Belgian politician.
- Bodil Joensen, 40, Danish pornographic actress, cirrhosis.
- Thomas Herbert Johnson, 82, American bibliographer.
- René Le Roy, 86, French flutist.
- Tadeusz Pełczyński, 92, Polish general.
- Bryna Raeburn, 69, American actress.
- Bahram Sadeghi, 47, Iranian novelist and poet.

=== 4 ===
- Michael Ala, 61, Vanuatuan politician.
- William Moore Benidickson, 73, Canadian politician.
- Allan Lister Samuel Brown, 67, Canadian politician.
- Victor Delhez, 82, Belgian-Argentine woodcarver.
- Harry Haywood, 86, American political activist.
- Sir Brian Horrocks, 89, British general and Olympic athlete (1924).
- David Dene Martin, 32, American convicted murderer, execution by electric chair.
- Lovro von Matačić, 85, Yugoslav Croatian conductor and composer.
- Russell Page, 78, British landscape architect, cancer.
- Lloyd Sealy, 68, American police officer and federal agent, heart attack.
- Wim Bos Verschuur, 80, Surinamese politician.

=== 5 ===
- Sadie Aitken, 79, Scottish theatre manager.
- Norberto Anido, 51, Argentine footballer.
- William Gidley Emmett, 97, British educationalist and industrial chemist.
- Sir Arthur John Grattan-Bellew, 81, Irish colonial administrator.
- John Paxton, 73, American screenwriter, emphysema.
- Franjo Punčec, 71, Yugoslav tennis player.
- Alexis Rannit, 70, Estonian-American poet, heart attack.
- Robert Surtees, 78, American cinematographer (Ben-Hur).
- Richard H. Thompson, 81, American philatelist.
- Matilde Urrutia, 72, Chilean memoirist, third wife of Pablo Neruda.
- Raymonde Vincent, 76, French writer.

=== 6 ===
- Mary Bastian, 36-37, Sri Lankan priest and human rights activist, shot.
- Elsy Blom-Wirz, 69, Swiss sculptor.
- Margaret Digby, 82, British writer.
- Helen Phillips Levin, 60, American disability rights advocate, respiratory disease.
- Lloyd Miller, 69, Australian triple jumper.
- Cornelius Osgood, 79, American anthropologist, heart attack.
- Robert W. Welch Jr., 85, American political organizer (John Birch Society).

=== 7 ===
- Edith Batten, 79, British educationalist and welfare worker.
- Billy Brown, 84, English footballer.
- Ruth Godfrey, 62, American actress, COPD.
- Johnny Guarnieri, 67, American pianist, heart attack.
- Esther Hill, 89, Canadian architect.
- Charles Evans Hughes III, 69, American architect.
- Ian Hugo, 86, American filmmaker.
- Vladimir Kokkinaki, 80, Soviet test pilot.
- Johann Ludwig, 81, German footballer.
- Eugene Lyons, 86, Russian-born American journalist.
- Albert McInroy, 83, English footballer.
- Barbara Myerhoff, 49, American anthropologist and filmmaker, lung cancer.
- Will Oursler, 71, American author.
- José Maria Pedroto, 56, Portuguese football player and manager, cancer.
- Lev Tsipursky, 55, Soviet Olympic cyclist (1952).
- Jules Vandooren, 76, French footballer.
- Zbysław Zając, 51, Polish racing cyclist and Olympic sprinter (1964).

=== 8 ===
- Eva Bowring, 92, American politician, member of the U.S. Senate (1954).
- Les Clenshaw, 79, English footballer.
- Aracy Cortes, 80, Brazilian singer and actress.
- James Dugundji, 65, American mathematician.
- Stig H:son Ericson, 87, Swedish naval admiral.
- Bjørn Føyn, 86, Norwegian zoologist.
- Esme Haywood, 84, English cricketer.
- Sir Harold Hillier, 80, English horticulturalist.
- John E. Horne, 76, American political strategist, administrator of the Small Business Administration (1961–1963), heart attack.
- Vladimir Maneev, 52, Soviet Olympic wrestler (1956), heart attack.
- Charles A. Marshall, 86, American cinematographer.
- Grace Morley, 84, American-Indian art historian and museum curator.
- Lette Valeska, 99, German-American painter and photographer.

=== 9 ===
- Penelope Johnson Allen, 98, American journalist and historian.
- Wyatt Rainey Blassingame, 75, American writer.
- Don Brennan, 64, English cricketer.
- John Cavanaugh, 63, American sculptor, lung cancer.
- Nichidatsu Fujii, 99, Japanese Buddhist monk and peace activist.
- William Arthur Harland, 58, Northern Irish physician.
- Marie Heffenisch, 82, Luxembourgish human rights activist.
- Erich Kull, 53, Swiss Olympic speed skater (1956).
- Henri Louette, 84, Belgian ice hockey player.
- Sir Robert Mayer, 105, German-born British philanthropist.

=== 10 ===
- André Bjerke, 66, Norwegian writer and poet.
- Beno Blachut, 71, Czechoslovak singer.
- Tsianina Redfeather Blackstone, 102, American singer.
- G. Homer Durham, 73, American academic administrator and Mormon leader.
- Edwin D. Eshleman, 64, American politician, member of the U.S. House of Representatives (1967–1977), cancer.
- Cie Frazier, 80, American jazz drummer.
- Edna Indermaur, 92, American singer.
- Anton Karas, 78, Austrian composer and zither player.
- Mary Kenneth Keller, 71, American computer scientist.
- Idar Kristiansen, 52, Norwegian writer.

=== 11 ===
- Richard Bartholomew, 58, Indian artist and art critic.
- Edward Buzzell, 89, American filmmaker.
- Kenny Clare, 55, British jazz drummer, esophageal cancer.
- Hubert H. Crawford, 74, American painter.
- Ralph Jesson, 91, American football coach.
- Donald M. Jones, 64, American college sports coach.
- Charles E. Kelly, 64, American soldier, Medal of Honor recipient.
- André Mattoni, 84, Austrian actor.
- Sir William McKell, 93, Australian politician, governor-general (1947–1953).
- Noëlle Norman, 64, French actress.
- Henry Olsson, 88, Swedish literary scholar.
- Edgar Reinhardt, 70, German Olympic handball player (1936).
- Joseph Carl Shaw, 29, American convicted murderer, execution by electric chair.
- Errol White, 83, British geologist.

=== 12 ===
- Vilanova Artigas, 69, Brazilian architect.
- John W. Byrnes, 71, American politician, member of the U.S. House of Representatives (1945–1973), stroke.
- Mark Kenny Carroll, 88, American Roman Catholic prelate, cancer.
- George Cassidy, 79, Australian footballer.
- Harry Froboess, 85, German diver and stuntman.
- Dave Hunter, 71, Canadian politician, heart attack.
- Sabri Kiraz, 66-67, Turkish football manager.
- Paul Luty, 52, British actor and wrestler.
- T. T. Macan, 74, British zoologist.
- Éloi Machoro, 35-36, New Caledonian politician, shot.

=== 13 ===
- Baek Nak-jun, 89, South Korean politician, acting president (1960).
- Peter Chong, 86, American actor.
- Curt Dawson, 45, American actor, AIDS.
- Jerome H. Holland, 69, American diplomat and academic administrator, cancer.
- Pug Manders, 71, American football player, heart attack.
- Adam Marczyński, 76, Polish painter.
- Sir Kenneth O'Connor, 88, British judge.
- Madan Puri, 69, Indian actor.
- Mitani Takanobu, 92, Japanese diplomat.
- Irena Trečiokaitė-Žebenkienė, 75, Soviet Lithuanian painter.
- Sam Valentine, 50, American football player.
- Moira Verschoyle, 81, Irish novelist and playwright.
- Adam Walsh, 83, American football player and coach, lung cancer.
- Carol Wayne, 42, American actress, drowned.

=== 14 ===
- Teodoro Agoncillo, 72, Filipino historian.
- Alfred Allen, Baron Allen of Fallowfield, 70, British trade unionist.
- Avis Christiansen, 89, American hymnwriter.
- Jetta Goudal, 93, Dutch-American actress.
- Anagarika Govinda, 86, German Buddhist monk and poet.
- Ed Gross, 68, American Olympic gymnast (1932).
- Rubin Juster, 61, American football player.
- Suzanne Kiffer-Porte, 83, French Olympic swimmer (1924).
- Annada Munsi, 79, Indian painter and musicologist.
- Robert Odeman, 80, German composer and pianist.
- Cleo O'Donnell Jr., 63, American basketball coach.
- Karl Schmitt-Walter, 84, German opera singer.
- Allan Shivers, 77, American politician, governor of Texas (1949–1957), heart attack.
- June Tripp, 83, British-American actress.
- Gisken Wildenvey, 92, Norwegian novelist.

=== 15 ===
- Louis Abramson, 97, American architect.
- Đuka Agić, 78, Yugoslav Croatian footballer.
- Martin Dzúr, 65, Czechoslovak politician.
- Marshall Kent, 76, American actor.
- Bill Murphy, 70, American football player.
- Edward Peter, 82-83, Trinidadian cricketer.
- Margaret Pilkington, 78, British scouting organization executive.
- Puccio Pucci, 80, Italian Olympic runner (1924) and lawyer.
- Jessie Sanders, 91, American politician and ranch operator.
- Josef Sedláček, 91, Austrian footballer.
- Fumio Yanoguchi, 67, Japanese recording engineer.

=== 16 ===
- Keith Brennan, 69, Australian diplomat.
- Lou Bruce, 51, Canadian football player.
- Ken Chase, 71, American baseball player.
- Robert Fitzgerald, 74, American poet, literary critic and translator.
- Paul Gipson, 38, American football player, heart attack.
- Daniel Lecourtois, 82, French actor.
- Stanley Nibbs, 70, British Virgin Islander educator.
- Arnt Njargel, 83, Norwegian politician.
- Leo O'Connor, 94, Australian cricketer.
- Ruth Orkin, 63, American photographer and filmmaker, cancer.
- Saidie Patterson, 78, Northern Irish trade unionist and peace activist.
- Cyril Snedden, 91, New Zealand cricketer.
- Árpád Szenes, 87, Hungarian-French painter.

=== 17 ===
- Ezio Acchini, 63, Italian Olympic rower (1948).
- Evelyn Barron, 86, Australian politician.
- Luiz Carvalho, 77, Brazilian footballer.
- Edna Meade Colson, 96, American educator.
- Walter Franz, 77, American politician, member of the Minnesota Senate (1955–1971).
- Richmond Francis Hanna, 71, Canadian politician, MP (1953–1957).
- Horrie Jenkin, 91, Australian footballer.
- George Nicksich, 56, American football player, liver failure.
- Harry Rigby, 59-60, American theatre producer.
- Philaxinos Samuel, 54, Indian Syrian Orthodox prelate.
- Joseph Simonson, 80, American diplomat.

=== 18 ===
- Mordechai Bentov, 84, Russian-born Israeli politician and journalist.
- Wilfrid Brambell, 72, Irish actor (Steptoe and Son), cancer.
- Josef Dahmen, 81, German actor.
- Kal P. Dal, 35, Swedish rock musician, stroke.
- Werly Fairburn, 60, American rockabilly musician.
- Werner Kern, 78, German chemist.
- Lee Hsiu-fen, 74, Chinese politician.
- Noel Lytton, 4th Earl of Lytton, 84, British writer and hereditary peer.
- Charles Russell, 66, American actor.
- Neil D. Schaerrer, 54, American Mormon organizer and attorney.
- Anwar Shemza, 56, Pakistani-British artist and writer, heart attack.
- Georgie Stoll, 79, American composer and musical director.
- Mahmoud Mohammed Taha, 75-76, Sudanese politician, religious thinker, and convicted apostate, execution by hanging.
- Santiago Urtizberea, 75, Spanish football player and coach.
- John Wolfenden, Baron Wolfenden, 78, British educationalist and museum curator.

=== 19 ===
- Howard M. Baldrige, 90, American politician, member of the U.S. House of Representatives (1931–1933).
- Juan Antonio Corretjer, 76, Puerto Rican poet and independence activist, heart attack.
- Byington Ford, 94, American real estate developer, pancreatic cancer.
- Jack Gariss, 64, American meditation instructor.
- Sylvain Grysolle, 69, Belgian racing cyclist.
- Shelah Richards, 81, Irish actress and television producer.
- Tom Richards, 74, Welsh Olympic runner (1948).
- Svein Rosseland, 90, Norwegian astrophysicist.
- Virginia Tucker, 75, American mathematician.
- Eric Voegelin, 84, German-American political philosopher.

=== 20 ===
- Thomas Balogh, Baron Balogh, 79, British economist.
- Arthur Harold John Brook, 77-78, English brewing executive.
- Robert Fraser, 80, Australian-British television executive.
- Dermot St. John Gogarty, 76, Irish architect.
- James Hugh Keeley Jr., 89, American diplomat.
- Gillis William Long, 61, American politician, member of the U.S. House of Representatives (1963–1965, since 1973), heart failure.
- Gabiden Mustafin, 82, Soviet Kazakh writer and politician.
- Karel Soucek, 37, Czechoslovak-Canadian daredevil, injuries sustained from a fall.

=== 21 ===
- James Beard, 81, American chef, cookbook author, and television personality, heart failure.
- Alida Fowlkes, 76, American preservationist.
- Nancy Eaton, 23, Canadian heiress, stabbed.
- Eddie Graham, 55, American professional wrestler, suicide by gunshot.
- Arthur Ernest Hagg, 96-97, British aircraft and boat designer.
- Roy V. Harris, 89, American politician.
- Jim Houghton, 73, Australian politician.
- Betty Joel, 90, British furniture and interior designer.
- Yusuf Lule, 72, Ugandan politician, president (1979), kidney failure.
- Jan Peka, 90, Czechoslovak ice hockey player.
- Luise Ullrich, 74, Austrian actress, cancer.

=== 22 ===
- William J. Bain, 88, Canadian architect.
- Sir Arthur Bryant, 85, English historian and journalist.
- Maria Bujakowa, 83, Polish sculptor.
- Henri Dorgères, 87, French political activist.
- Wilbur Dyer, 77, American politician, member of the Louisiana House of Representatives (1974–1980).
- František Fuhrherr-Nový, 81, Czechoslovak Olympic pole vaulter (1924).
- Mikhail Gromov, 85, Soviet aviator.
- Paul Harteck, 82, Austrian-American chemist.
- Daniel W. Lee, 65, American soldier, Medal of Honor recipient.
- Catherine Nimmo, 97, Dutch-American vegan activist.
- Bernhard Sprengel, 85, German art collector and chocolate manufacturer.

=== 23 ===
- Hira Lal Atal, 79, Indian general.
- Hugh Brown, 78, British-born American sportswriter.
- Francisco Campana, 59, Argentine footballer.
- Lois Delander, 73, American model.
- Mark Hodson, 77, British Anglican prelate.
- Sir Emile Littler, 81, English theatre producer.
- Harry H. Peterson, 94, American lawyer, judge and politician, attorney general of Minnesota (1933–1936).
- Rubén Rabanal, 49-50, Argentine politician.
- Itsurō Sakisaka, 87, Japanese economist.
- Shigetaka Takashima, 77, Japanese physicist.
- Arthur Tyler, 77, English cricketer.
- Vladimir Vetrov, 52, Soviet double agent, executed.
- Botir Zokirov, 48, Soviet Uzbek singer.

=== 24 ===
- Antonio Andrés Sancho, 71, Spanish racing cyclist.
- Betty Carnegy-Arbuthnott, 78, British Olympic fencer (1936, 1948).
- Alan Finger, 75, Australian medical practitioner and political activist.
- Ron Fry, 47, Australian footballer.
- Dalmacio Langarica, 65, Spanish racing cyclist.
- H. H. Lewis, 84, American poet.
- Linda Reaves, 35, American schoolteacher, shot.
- Hubertus-Maria Ritter von Heigl, 87, German general.
- Pyotr Suvchinsky, 92, Russian-French music writer.

=== 25 ===
- Patrick Harvey Ashby, 94, Canadian politician.
- Ralph Broome, 95, British Olympic bobsledder (1924).
- Frank Campbell, 77, Scottish footballer.
- Sir David Scott Fox, 74, British diplomat.
- Helen Morgan Hamilton, 88, American soldier.
- Ilias Iliou, 80, Greek politician.
- Ajoy Kar, 70, Indian filmmaker.
- Samuel Koechlin, 59, Swiss Olympic equestrian (1956).
- Col Laidlaw, 88, Australian footballer.
- Yevgeny Maskinskov, 54, Soviet Olympic racewalker (1956).
- John Purdue, 74, New Zealand rugby player.
- Najmadin Shukr Rauf, 27, Iraqi Kurdish guerrilla fighter, shot.
- Paul Smith, 78, American film composer (Pinocchio, Snow White and the Seven Dwarfs, Cinderella).
- Lisa Ullmann, 77, German-British dance teacher.
- Koos van der Wildt, 79, Dutch footballer.

=== 26 ===
- Sos Alikhanian, 78, Soviet Armenian geneticist.
- James Cameron, 73, British journalist.
- Kenny Clarke, 71, American jazz drummer, heart attack.
- Lawrence Alexander Glenn, 84, American Roman Catholic prelate.
- Sir David Ormsby-Gore, 5th Baron Harlech, 66, British diplomat and politician, MP (1950–1961), traffic collision.
- Anne Spencer Parry, 53, Australian fantasy author, cancer.
- Mario Petri, 63, Italian singer and actor.
- Clara Weisenborn, 77, American politician, member of the Ohio Senate (1967–1974).

=== 27 ===
- Doug Chapman, 54, Canadian ice hockey player.
- Jeremiah Chirau, 61, Zimbabwean tribal chief and politician.
- Eric Cross, 88, English cricketer.
- Ursula Katherine Duncan, 74, Scottish botanist.
- Bill Gavin, 77, American radio personality and publisher, cancer.
- Charles Goldhamer, 81, American-born Canadian artist.
- Arend Hauer, 75, Dutch actor.
- Joseph Howard Hodges, 73, American Roman Catholic prelate, lung cancer.
- Ife Holmes, 79, American basketball player.
- Bernard Pask, 48, English footballer.
- Salipada Pendatun, 72, Filipino politician, traffic collision.

=== 28 ===
- Gertrude Bancroft, 76, American economist.
- Éliane Basse, 85, French paleontologist.
- Alfredo Foni, 74, Italian football player and coach.
- Rudolf Gamsjäger, 75, Austrian opera administrator.
- Anna Colquitt Hunter, 93, American preservationist.
- Les Irwin, 86, Australian politician, MP (1963–1972).
- Tommy Jarrell, 83, American fiddler and banjoist, heart failure.
- Melvin Judkins, 62, American physician.
- André Laloux, 87, Belgian tennis player.
- Laurence Patrick Lee, 71-72, New Zealand cartographer.
- Wade Nichols, 38, American actor, AIDS.
- Leopold Pars, 89, British mathematician.
- Jean-Pierre Rassam, 43, French film producer, drug overdose.
- Fred Shields, 72, American soccer player.
- Arthur Percy Swallow, 91, Canadian politician.
- Yves Van Strydonk De Burkel, 77, Belgian Olympic equestrian (1936).
- Bernard Pierre Wolff, 54, French-born American photographer, AIDS.

=== 29 ===
- Neil Cameron, Baron Cameron of Balhousie, 64, British RAF officer, cancer.
- Ernest Chambers, 77, English racing cyclist.
- Donald Cochrane, 80, Australian politician.
- Billy Cook, 75, Australian racing jockey.
- Luis Dato, 78, Filipino poet.
- Chic Murray, 65, Scottish comedian and actor.
- Natalma, 27, American-bred Canadian Thoroughbred racehorse, euthanized.
- "King" Bennie Nawahi, 85, American guitarist.
- Herbert Parsons Patterson, 59, American banker, respiratory failure.
- Ngoi Pēwhairangi, 63, New Zealand Māori activist.
- Don Raye, 75, American songwriter ("Boogie Woogie Bugle Boy").
- Onslow S. Rolfe, 90, American general.
- Jorge Sagredo Pizarro, 29, Chilean serial killer, execution by firing squad.
- William Schneiderman, 79, American political activist.
- Freda Swain, 82, British composer and pianist.
- Claude Titre, 54, French actor.
- Carlos Topp Collins, 35, Chilean serial killer, execution by firing squad.

=== 30 ===
- Salih Mahdi Ammash, 60-61, Iraqi politician, vice president (1970–1971).
- Joe Bradshaw, 87, American baseball player.
- Walt Brewster, 77, American football player.
- Benedict Garmisa, 71, American politician, heart attack.
- Pedro González Bueno, 89, Spanish politician.
- Ivar Haglund, 79, American folk singer and restaurateur (Ivar's).
- Harold Innes, 75, New Zealand businessman.
- Felix H. Man, 91, German-British photojournalist.
- Ken Mayer, 66, American actor (Space Patrol), heart attack.
- Paul Mugnier, 78, French Olympic skier (1932).
- Marjorie Naylor, 76-77, New Zealand artist.
- Jim Reynolds, 65, American football player.
- F. R. Scott, 85, Canadian poet and lawyer.
- John Clay Walker, 36, American journalist, blunt force trauma.
- Tom White, 67, British Olympic runner (1948, 1952).

=== 31 ===
- Charlie Anderson, 81, Australian footballer.
- Arnie Arenz, 73, American football player.
- Menachem Bader, 89, Austrian-born Israeli politician.
- Reginald Baker, 88, British film producer.
- John L. Childs, 86, American educator.
- Tatsuzō Ishikawa, 79, Japanese writer.
- Armand "Jump" Jackson, 67, American blues musician.
- Dutch Lonborg, 86, American college sports player and coach.
- Józef Mackiewicz, 82, Polish writer.
- Jean-Pierre Moris, 81, Luxembourgish Olympic swimmer (1924).
- Jimmy Noel, 81, American actor and stuntman.
- James L. Reid, 77, American politician and judge, member of the Maine House of Representatives (1950–1956).
- Gerard Rotherham, 85, English cricketer.
