= Arthur Tyler =

Arthur Tyler may refer to:

- Arthur Tyler (bobsleigh) (1915–2008), American bobsledder
- Arthur Tyler (politician) (1883–1972), Australian politician
- Arthur Tyler (cricketer) (1907–1985), English cricketer and British Army officer
