= Heigl (surname) =

Heigl is a German language surname. Notable people with the surname include:

- Katherine Heigl (born 1978), American actress, film producer and fashion model
- Hubertus-Maria Ritter von Heigl (1897–1985), General major in the Wehrmacht during World War II
- Philipp Heigl (born 1993), Austrian cyclo-cross cyclist

== See also ==
- Catherine Hiegel
- Karl August von Heigel
