= Nibbs =

Nibbs is a surname of French and Old English and German origin and may refer to:

- Stanley Nibbs (1914–1985) teacher and preacher from the British Virgin Islands.
- Arthur Nibbs Antigua and Barbuda politician
- Richard Henry Nibbs (1816–1893) English painter and book illustrator
