= Eric Cross =

Eric Cross may refer to:

- Eric Cross (cinematographer) (1902–2004), English cinematographer
- Eric William Blake Cross (1904–1965), Canadian politician
- Eric Cross (writer) (1905–1980), Irish writer
- Eric Cross (cricketer) (1896–1985), English cricketer
