= Irving Rouse =

American archaeologist (1913–2006)

- Born: Benjamin Irving Rouse; August 29, 1913; Rochester, New York
- Died: February 24, 2006 (aged 92); New Haven, Connecticut
- Education: Yale University
- Known for: Circum-Caribbean archaeology, classification of archaeological materials
- Scientific career
- Fields: Anthropology, Archaeology

Benjamin Irving Rouse (August 29, 1913 – February 24, 2006) was an American archaeologist on the faculty of Yale University best known for his work in the Greater and Lesser Antilles of the Caribbean, especially in Haiti. He also conducted fieldwork in Florida and Venezuela. He made major contributions to the development of archaeological theory, with a special emphasis on taxonomy and classification of archaeological materials and studies of human migration.

== Early life ==
Rouse was born on August 29, 1913, in Rochester, New York, the son of Louise Gillespie (Bohachek) and Benjamin Irving Rouse. His maternal grandfather was Czech. His family had been in the plant nursery industry for nearly a century, and Ben (as he was known to family and friends) was planning on continuing in the family business when he enrolled at Yale University in 1930 as a plant science major. His father had also attended Yale as an undergraduate.

== Education ==
Rouse began his academic career studying forestry and obtained his bachelor's degree in plant science from Yale University's Sheffield Scientific School in 1934. Rouse identifies his background in botany as a major factor in his lifelong interest in classification and taxonomy. As a result of family financial reversals resulting from the Wall Street Crash of 1929 and the Great Depression from 1929 to 1932, Rouse needed employment to continue at Yale. As an undergraduate, he worked at the Yale Peabody Museum of Natural History cataloging archaeological specimens. It was through this job that Rouse met Cornelius Osgood, who convinced Rouse to take some graduate-level anthropology courses and eventually enroll in the graduate program at Yale, where Osgood directed his doctoral dissertation. Rouse claimed that his perception of the need for classification in what was at that time the young field of anthropology was a major factor in his decision to pursue a career in anthropology rather than the much more established field (in terms of classification of materials) of botany. His dissertation was eventually published in two parts, the first exploring method and analysis entitled Prehistory in Haiti: A Study in Method (1939), the second an application of these methods entitled Culture of the Ft. Liberté Region, Haiti (1941).

== Professional career ==
Upon receiving his Ph.D. in 1938, Rouse accepted a job as assistant curator at Yale's Peabody Museum. He was promoted to associate curator (1947) and research associate (1954). While employed at the museum, Rouse also taught courses in anthropology, beginning as an instructor in anthropology from 1939 to 1943, advancing to Assistant Professor (1943), Associate Professor (1948), Professor (1954), and finally becoming Charles J. MacCurdy Professor of Anthropology (1970), holding this position until his retirement in 1984. He held many positions in professional organizations, including serving as editor of American Antiquity, president of the Society for American Archaeology (1952–1953), vice president of the American Ethnological Society (1957–1958), associate editor of American Anthropologist (1960–1962), and president of the American Anthropological Association (1967–1968). He was also a member of the National Academy of Sciences, a fellow of the American Academy of Arts and Sciences, and Guggenheim Fellow.

=== Dissertation ===
Rouse was a major contributor to the study of Caribbean archaeology, and his contribution to this field began with his dissertation, which was broken down into two parts and dealt with the culture of the Ft. Liberté region of Haiti. The first segment of his dissertation is a definition of the methods he would use in studying the cultures of this region titled Prehistory in Haiti: A Study in Method (1939).

In the second segment of his dissertation, a work titled Culture of the Ft. Liberté Region, Haiti (1941), Rouse examines three cultures that occupied the region. The first culture he classifies is the Couri culture. Most of the evidence about Couri culture comes in the form of material culture, defined by Rouse as concerning "standards observable in the artefacts [sic] of the sites under study" He observes sixteen "types" of artifacts (defined here as "the set of standards to which the artifacts as a whole conform"), mostly flint, but some ground stone and shell artifacts as well. The flint artifacts included daggers, knives, and scrapers, which were often large and crude. These flint daggers and knives are the only evidence present that might indicate warfare. The ground stone artifacts included stone axes and various types of hammer-grinders, beads, and other small objects. These objects would have been made through either flaking, battering, or grinding techniques. Some of the smaller stone balls might be evidence of some sort of game or entertainment activity. There is evidence of a workshop for the manufacture of the axes in the area, however it appears that the flint objects were made elsewhere, indicating that there was probably some sort of trade system in place. Both shell objects are made from conch shells, and there is evidence of a well developed art design, as the pendant is decorated with parallel and zig-zagged bands. Not much about the non-material culture of the Couri (defined by Rouse as "concerned with customs which have been inferred by artifacts) is known. Rouse was unable to discover any definitive linguistic information about the Couri, nor was he able to find information about their clothing, shelter, or population. He suspected the Couri groups were semi-nomadic and band-like in structure due to the small, shallow nature of the sites excavated. He believes that the concept of private property may have had a role in the Couri culture, giving the stone beads and stone and shell pendants as examples. He was unable to discern anything about the religion practiced by the Couri groups, if that concept existed at all for them.

The second culture Rouse identifies is called the Meillac group. In his excavations Rouse was able to recover 9,642 artifacts, over 9,200 of which were pottery sherds. These sherds were classified into 30 types. Most if the Meillac cultural material consisted of cooking pottery and "clay griddle". One particular type of cooking pottery that was popular in the region both in the Meillac and Carrier groups (discussed below) was the "pepper pot", a vessel in which most of their prepared food was made. Stone tools were rare, but some were recovered throughout the course of excavation. The flint tools that were recovered were similar to those represented in the Couri group, but the ground-stone artifacts were more developed than their Couri predecessors. Coral was utilized for the first time in the region by the Meillac groups, who used unworked coral as "rasps" and picks. Rouse identifies the Meillac groups as sedentary agriculturist, who relied not only on shellfish, seafood, and birds for subsistence, but they also probably cultivated corn and manioc and collected wild vegetables. Social organization would have been well developed and similar to that of historical times. He believed that they would have likely spoken the Arawak language, as they were likely the predecessors of the Carrier people, who spoke Arawak. The population of Meillac groups must have been many times larger than the population of Couri groups. People would have lived in small villages, presumably in some sort of small structure, although the only evidence we have regarding shelter comes from small middens. Trade would have been prevalent based on the presence exotic pottery types. Rouse believed that the attire of the groups would have been very light, as there is no evidence of clothing production. Evidence of 9 burials were recovered (8 of which were inhumations), which indicates some concept of life after death. There also appears to be evidence of a very early stage of the worship of zemis, Haitian historical deities, although this concept would have been in the early stages of development. There was some evidence of cutting on human remains found at Meillac sites, leading Rouse to believe that cannibalism may have been occurring. He hypothesizes that this is not out of need for food, but rather as some sort of ritual with supernatural significance. He notes, however, that there is no historical evidence for cannibalism.

The final group examines by Rouse in his dissertation is called the Carrier group. During excavation of Carrier sites, Rouse recovered 2,791 artifacts, over 2,500 of which were potsherds classified into 23 types. Artifacts came in the form of the aforementioned pottery sherds, flint tools, ground-stone artifacts, and shell artifacts. Bone artifact were rare. The flint artifacts were similar in form to both the Couri and Meillac flint artifacts, while the ground-stone tools were similar to the Meillac ground-stone artifacts. The most elaborate types of artifact were the cooking pots, which included pepper pots similar to those found at Meillac sites. The only art known from these groups comes from decoration on cooking pots, which included linear geometric drawings and modeled heads. Rouse believes that Carrier people spoke the Arawak language, and were sedentary agriculturalist who hunted small animals and shellfish and, like Meillac groups, cultivated manioc and corn, along with other wild vegetables. Social organization would have been similar to Meillac group social structure, with people living houses grouped into villages. Like with the Meillac groups, Rouse believes there may be evidence for cannibalism.

=== Contribution to circum-Caribbean archaeology ===
Rouse began doing fieldwork in the Caribbean in 1934, when he worked in Haiti on the material that would lead to his dissertation. From 1935–1938 conducted fieldwork in Puerto Rico as part of the Scientific Survey of Puerto Rico and the Virgin Islands project. It was through the information obtained from this project that Rouse developed a theory that different assemblages were not the result of different migrations (a theory held by a mentor of his, Froelich Rainey), but were instead the result of a single line of development. This event sparked a lifelong interest in identifying migrations of people and understanding the reason for migrations of human populations. In 1941, Rouse and Osgood conducted research in Cuba which resulted in each publishing half of an edition of a Yale University Publications in Anthropology volume in 1942. Osgood's segment was titled The Ciboney Culture of Cayo Redondo, Cuba which focused on the classification of a collection of stone, shell, coral, and bone objects from the Cayo Redondo excavation in western Cuba. Rouse's segment was titled Archaeology of the Maniabon Hills, Cuba where he examined artifacts from a number of sites in Cuba and classifies them as either having been inhabited by Ciboney Indians or Sub-Tainos

Rouse spent time in 1946 in Trinidad, working with John Albert Bullbrook on his 1953 manuscript Excavations at Wari, Ayacucho, Peru and on the Excavations of a Shell Mound at Palo Seco, Trinidad, B. W. I.. He returned to the island in 1953 to do some additional work with John Goggin.

In 1963 Rouse collaborated with José M. Cruxent on a publication examining Venezuelan archaeology. In this publication, Rouse and Cruxent identify two ways in which cultures can be classified: chronologically and ethnically. The authors identify four major epochs (chronological classification) to which the remains of each distinct group of people with distinct cultural traits (ethnic classification) will be assigned. The first epoch is the "Paleo-Indian" epoch, which began with the first inhabitants of Venezuela around 15,000 BC?. These people were big game hunters. The only ethnic "series" that belongs in the Paleo-Indian epoch is the Juboid series. The Meso-Indian epoch began about 5000 BC. It was a time when hunting was emphasized, as evidenced by projectile points uncovered during excavation. They were not hunting the same type of big-game animals as the Paleo-Indians were, as that food source became extinct by the time the Meso-Indian epoch started. Sites were identified largely by large piles of shells, which also indicated a reliance upon seafood as a source of subsistence. The Manicuaroid series was the only ethnic series that fit in the Meso-Indian epoch. The third epoch, the Neo-Indian epoch, was characterized by the sufficient development of agriculture as a means to replace hunting as the principle mean of subsistence. This epoch began at roughly 1000 BC and included 10 ethnic series: the Dabajuroid, Tocuyanoid, Tierroid, Ocumeriod, Saladoid, Barrancoid, Arauquinoid, Valencioid, Memoid, and Guayaabitoid series.

In 1973 Rouse had a heart attack while on a project in Antigua, signaling the end to his fieldwork career. This project was not a total disaster, however. As a result of the research done a much better understanding of the culture history of the northern Antilles was constructed.

==== Migrations in Caribbean prehistory ====
One major contribution Rouse made to Caribbean archaeology involves the reconstruction of the migrations that were responsible for the populating of the islands. Rouse believed that the population of the Caribbean occurred in four migrations from mainland South America The first migration came in what Rouse called the "lithic" age, which happened around 6000 years ago based on the dates of the earliest sites on the islands. The second major migration occurred during the Archaic age, the third during the Ceramic age, and the final migration took place during the Historic age. Other archaeologists believed that every new pottery type was a product of a new migration from the mainland. Throughout his career, Rouse maintained that the only migrations to the islands were those mentioned above. In a 1996 interview, Rouse asserted that "My efforts have largely been devoted to trying to counteract the assumption that everything had to come in from the outside."

One question which was of particular interest to Rouse with regards to migrations in prehistory involves the story of the Taíno. This was the culture, which was fairly complex in social structure, that was first encountered by Old World explorers, most notably Christopher Columbus. In 1986 Rouse published Migrations in Prehistory: Inferring Population Movement from Cultural Remains, a volume that included migratory hypotheses regarding the Taíno, along with Polynesian, Japanese and Eskimo migrations. In this volume Rouse discusses different population movements throughout the world, and discusses his view of the proper way to study prehistoric migrations. A review of this publication outlines the general technique Rouse believed would be most useful in studying migrations. The archaeologist must create testable hypotheses and inferences, with emphasis placed upon local development, acculturation, and transculturation. The hypotheses should also be tested against other forms of anthropological data, such as linguistic and physical anthropological data. In 1993 he published a book specifically about the Taíno titled The Taíno: Rise and Decline of the People Who Greeted Columbus. The work that Rouse did on the Taíno culture is still relevant today due to what is being called the "Taíno Revival" movement, which claims that contrary to the belief of most, the Taíno people are not extinct, as most history books claim. On the contrary, the movement asserts that there are still many Taíno peoples still in existence (especially in areas like Puerto Rico) who aim to show that their culture was never destroyed, despite what history books say.

==== Contribution to archaeological method and theory ====
Rouse was a proponent of the cultural historical approach to archaeology, and in "The Strategy of Culture History", Rouse identifies and examines the goals of this approach. Rouse identifies "objectives" as the building blocks of any archaeological research project, and the ultimate goal of any research project is the synthesis of a series of these objectives, which he defines as "the end-product of any particular segment in the procedure of culture-historical research." The quality of research will depend largely on the objectives chosen by the researcher, therefore one must consider carefully the objective of one's research before he or she begins in order to maximize the usefulness and quality of the research. He identifies a number of objective types which may be pursued in this article, including descriptive, classificatory, geographical, and chronological objectives. Rouse believed that classification was knowledge, and that a complete culture history could be produced by identifying and classifying cultures and placing them in a chronological and spatial framework.

In a 1960 article in American Antiquity, Rouse breaks classification of artifacts down into two forms, analytic and taxonomic, and discusses the goals of each form. The end product of analytic classification is the "mode", which is produced by creating a series of classes representing different features of the artifact. Each class represents a procedure or custom followed by the maker during the process of formation. This custom or concept is the mode. Taxonomic classification is done by creating a set of classes which differentiate the artifacts in a collection by type (type being the end product of Taxonomic classification). These classes are constituted of two or more modes. Therefore, a "type" is made up of selected modes. Rouse notes that while modes are "inherent" in a collection, types are created by the archaeologist by selecting the modes which he determines to be relevant. Modes, then, are a natural unit of cultural study, whereas types are an artificial unit created by the individual archaeologist. Rouse developed his mode-attribute analysis technique, which looks at clusters of traits independently of type, as an alternate to type-variety analysis because he felt it was more sensitive to change through time.

== Personal life ==
On July 24, 1939, Rouse married Mary Mikami, a fellow graduate student in anthropology at Yale. Irving and Mary had two sons, David and Peter. David continued the family tradition by becoming an urban landscape architect, while Peter worked as chief of staff for both Tom Daschle and Barack Obama in the United States Senate.

== Significant publications ==
- 1939 "Prehistory in Haiti: A Study in Method" Yale University Publications in Anthropology No. 21, New Haven, Yale University Press.
- 1941 "Culture of the Ft Liberté Region, Haiti" Yale University Publications in Anthropology No. 24, New Haven, Yale University Press.
- 1942 "Archaeology of the Maniabon Hills, Cuba" Yale University Publications in Anthropology No. 26, New Haven, Yale University Press.
- 1953 "The Strategy of Culture History", Anthropology Today, edited by A.L. Kroeber, pp 57–76. Chicago, University of Chicago Press.
- 1953 "The Circum-Caribbean Theory, An Archaeological Test" American Anthropologist Volume 55, No. 2, 188–200.
- 1955 "On the Correlation of Phases of Culture" American Anthropologist Volume 57, No. 4, 713–722.
- 1960 "The Classification of Artifacts in Archaeology", American Antiquity Volume 25, No. 3, 313–323.
- 1963 Venezuelan Archaeology, Irving Rouse and José M. Cruxent, New Haven and London, Yale University Press.
- 1966 "Caribbean Ceramics: A Study in Method and Theory" Ceramics and Man, Viking Fund Publications in Anthropology, Volume 41, ed. F. R. Matson, pp. 88–103. New York, Wenner-Gren Foundation for Anthropological Research.
- 1972 Introduction to Prehistory: A Systematic Approach, New York, McGraw-Hill.
- 1977 "Pattern and Process in West Indian Archaeology" World Archaeology Volume 9, No. 1, 1–11.
- 1986 Migrations in Prehistory: Inferring Population Movement from Cultural Remains", New Haven, Yale University Press.
- 1992 The Tainos: Rise and Decline of the People Who Greeted Columbus, New Haven, Yale University Press.
- 1999 "Excavations at the Indian Creek Site, Antigua, West Indies" Yale University Publications in Anthropology No. 82, New Haven, Yale University Press (With B. Faber Morse).
