= Tortola =

Largest of the British Virgin Islands

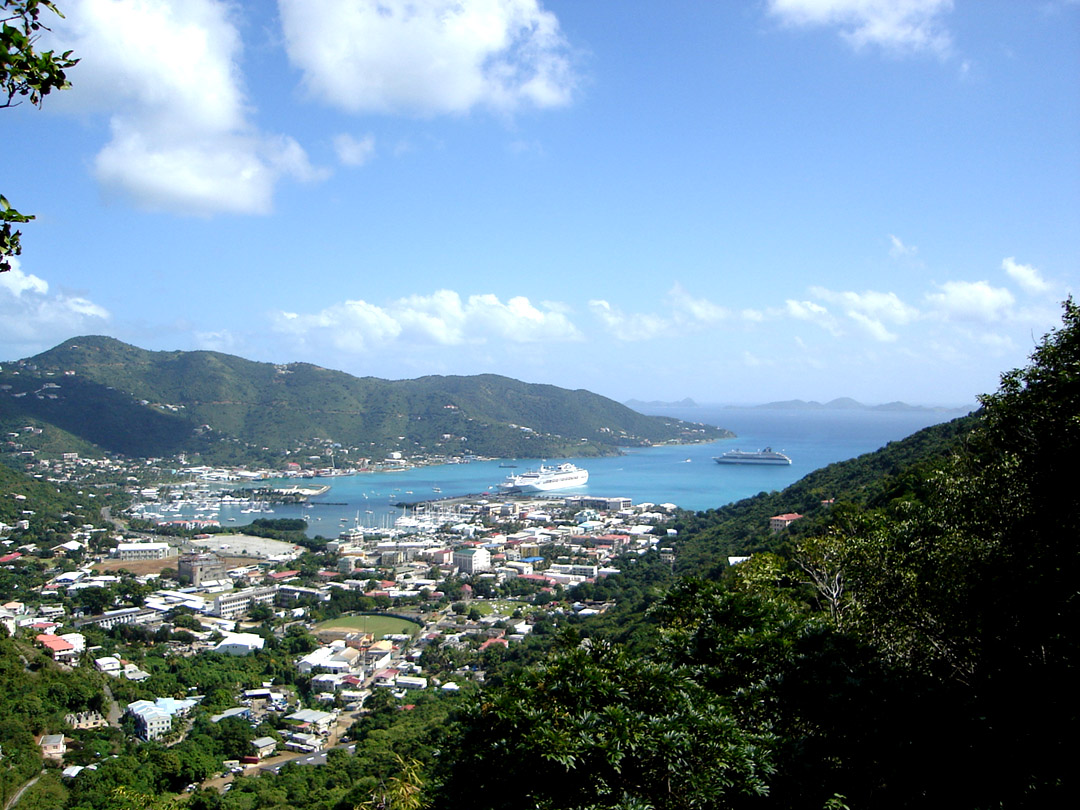
- Road Town, the largest settlement on Tortola, in 2006

- Location within British Virgin Islands Location within the Caribbean

Geography
- Location: Caribbean Sea
- Coordinates: 18°25′24″N 64°37′05″W
- Archipelago: Virgin Islands
- Area: 55.7 km^{2} (21.5 sq mi)
- Length: 19 km (11.8 mi)
- Width: 5 km (3.1 mi)
- Highest elevation: 530 m (1740 ft)
- Highest point: Mount Sage

Administration
- United Kingdom; British Virgin Islands
- British Overseas Territory: British Virgin Islands
- Largest settlement: Road Town (pop. 9,400)

Demographics
- Demonym: Tortolian
- Population: 23,491 (2010)
- Pop. density: 429.23/km^{2} (1111.7/sq mi)

Additional information
- Time zone: AST (UTC-4)
- ISO code: VG

Tortola (/tɔːrˈtoʊlə/) is the largest and most populated island of the British Virgin Islands, a group of islands that form part of the archipelago of the Virgin Islands. It has a surface area of 55.7 square kilometres (21.5 square miles) with a total population of 23,908, with 9,400 residents in Road Town. Mount Sage is its highest point at 530 metres (1,740 feet) above sea level.

Although the British Virgin Islands (BVI) are under the British flag, it uses the U.S. dollar as its official currency due to its proximity to and frequent trade with the U.S. Virgin Islands and Puerto Rico. The island is home to many offshore companies that do business worldwide. Financial services are a major part of the country's economy.

On 6 September 2017, the British Virgin Islands were extensively damaged by Hurricane Irma. The most severe destruction was on Tortola. News reports over the next day or two described the situation as "devastation".

== Etymology ==
The name Tortola may be an anglicization of the island's original Dutch name Ter-Tholen (or Nieu-Ter-Tholen),named after Tholen, a coastal island that is part of the Netherlands. (Note: The island's name is written as Ter Tholen (or New Ter Tholen)in mupltiple English-language documents. It may have evolved from "Ter Tholen" to "Tortola" via linguistic anglicization.)

Some sources have claimed that Christopher Columbus named the island Tórtola, meaning "turtle dove" in Spanish. (Note: Multiple historical documents refer to the island as "Turtle Dove" or "Island of the Turtle Doves".) Other sources, however, say Columbus named the island Santa Ana (Note: Multiple publications refer to Tortola as "Santa Ana (Tortola)".) (Note: One source claimed that the island's original Spanish name was Santa Ursula, although this is contradicted by sources claiming that Santa Ursula was the name for Virgin Gorda rather than Tortola.) after Saint Anne.

== History ==
On his second voyage for the Spanish Crown to the Caribbean or West Indies, Christopher Columbus spotted what are now called the British and U.S. Virgin Islands. He named the archipelago after the 11,000 virgins of the 5th-century Christian martyr St. Ursula. The Spanish made a few attempts to settle the islands, but pirates such as Blackbeard and Captain Kidd were the first permanent residents.

In the late 16th century, the English, who had successfully settled the area contesting claims by the Dutch, established a permanent plantation colony on Tortola and the surrounding islands. Settlers developed the islands for the sugarcane industry, with large plantations dependent on the slave labour of Africans bought from local chiefs and transported across the Atlantic. The majority of early settlers came in the late 18th century: Loyalists from the Thirteen Colonies after the American Revolutionary War were given land grants here by the Crown to encourage development. They brought their slaves with them, who outnumbered the British colonists. The sugar industry dominated Tortola economic history for more than a century until the abolishment of slavery.

In the early 19th century, after Britain abolished the international slave trade, the Royal Navy patrolled the Caribbean to intercept illegal slave ships. The colony settled liberated Africans from these ships on Tortola, in the then-unsettled Kingstown area. St. Phillip's Church was built in the early 19th century in this community as one of the earliest free black churches in the Americas.

After the abolition of slavery in the British colonies in 1834, planters found it difficult to make a profit in the sugar industry based on paying and managing free labour. At this time, Cuba and some South American countries still had slave labour in the sugar industry. In addition, there were changes in the sugar industry, with sugar beet cultivated in England and the United States offering a competing product. During the downturn as sugar agriculture became less profitable, a large proportion of the white landowning population left the British Virgin Islands. In 1867, an earthquake and tsunami hit the island.

In the late 1970s, the British businessman Ken Bates attempted to lease a large part of the neighbouring island of Anegada on a 199-year lease, but this action was blocked. Noel Lloyd, a local activist, led a protest movement forcing the local government to drop the plan. Today, a park on Tortola is named after Noel Lloyd and features a statue in his honour.

=== Hurricane Irma ===
On 6 September 2017, Tortola was extensively damaged by Hurricane Irma. A report by Sky News summarized the aftermath of the storm as: "The scale of the damage on the island of Tortola is truly shocking. You have to see it to appreciate just how massive this storm really was. The East End area of Tortola looks like a war zone; no building is untouched, the debris of entire houses destroyed, yachts, cars and enormous cargo containers is scattered in all directions and this is just one area."

By 8 September, the UK had sent the Royal Engineers and Commandos to reinstate law and order and to set up satellite communications with the world. More troops were expected to arrive a day or two later, but the ship HMS Ocean, carrying more extensive assistance, was not expected to reach the Virgin Islands for another two weeks. The Premier of the Virgin Islands, Orlando Smith, called for a comprehensive aid package to rebuild the British Virgin Islands (BVI). On 10 September, the UK's prime minister Theresa May pledged £32 million to the Caribbean for a hurricane relief fund; the UK government would also match donations made by the public via the British Red Cross appeal. Specifics were not provided to the news media as to the amount that would be allocated to each island.

British Foreign Secretary Boris Johnson visited Tortola on 13 September 2017 to confirm the United Kingdom's commitment to helping restore British islands. He said he was reminded of photos of Hiroshima after it had been hit by the atom bomb.

== Geography ==
Tortola is a mountainous island 19 km (12 mi) long and 5 km (3.1 mi) wide, with an area of 55.7 km^{2} (21.5 sq mi). Formed by volcanic activity, its highest peak is Mount Sage at 530 metres (1,740 feet). Tortola lies near an earthquake fault, and minor earthquakes are common.

== Government ==
The House of Assembly in the BVI consists of fourteen house representatives (the governor, four at-large, and one representative for each of the nine districts, eight of which are wholly or partially on Tortola). Whilst still under the British rule, the King appoints a Governor. The current Governor is John Rankin, who is the Head of Cabinet in the BVI. The House of Assembly is run by the Speaker of the House. The Deputy Governor is David Archer, the Premier is Natalio Wheatley (2022).The National Democratic Party (NDP) served two straight terms in office until it was defeated by the Virgin Islands Party (VIP) in the 2019 general election. The party that rules over the house is determined by if that party has seven or more seats.

== Economy and demographics ==
The population of Tortola is 23,908. The principal settlement is Road Town, the capital of the British Virgin Islands, with a population of 9,400.

Provision of financial services is a major part of the economy. The International Business Companies Act, passed in the early 1980s, encouraged such businesses and has generated significant growth in professional jobs and related revenues. BVI residents are amongst the most affluent in the Eastern Caribbean. Numerous residents from other Caribbean islands also work here.

Citco is a privately owned global hedge fund administrator headquartered in Tortola, founded in 1948. It is the world's largest hedge fund administrator, managing over $1 trillion in assets under administration.

Although the British Virgin Islands (BVI) are under the British flag, Tortola uses the U.S. dollar as its official currency due to its proximity to and frequent trade with the U.S. Virgin Islands and Puerto Rico. The island is home to many offshore companies that do business worldwide.

The extensive damage (devastation) caused by Hurricane Irma in September 2017 affected the economy. Residents were looking to the UK to provide significant financial aid. Premier Orlando Smith called for a comprehensive aid package to rebuild the British Virgin Islands. The UK pledged £32 million of aid for Caribbean islands that were affected by the hurricane but did not provide specifics as to the amount that would be allocated to the BVI.

== Attractions ==
The northern coast has the best beaches on the island, including Smuggler's Cove, Long Bay, Cane Garden Bay, Brewer's Bay, Josiah's Bay, and Lambert Beach. In addition to beaches, marine activities such as sailing, surfing, scuba diving, kite boarding, and windsurfing are available. Many tourists visit the historic sites and hike in parks. The island is visited regularly by large cruise ships.

== Transportation ==
Tortola can be reached both by sea and by air. The island has taxi services.

Flights to Tortola arrive at the Terrance B. Lettsome International Airport. The airport is located on Beef Island, just to the east of Tortola, and is connected by the Queen Elizabeth II Bridge. Many airlines provide scheduled service from San Juan. Island Birds Air Charter connects to San Juan, Saint Thomas, Antigua and St Marten. InterCaribbean Airways, Ltd. and Sky High Aviation Services offers non-stop flights between Dominican Republic and Beef Island. American Airlines flies jet service from Miami to Lettsome, via Saint Thomas.

Multiple ferry companies serve the island. The ferries run between Charlotte Amalie in the center of St. Thomas, and Red Hook in the East End of St. Thomas and St. John, and either Road Town or the West End of Tortola.

== Education ==
The British Virgin Islands operates several government schools.

The following pre-primary schools serve Tortola residents:

- Althea Scatliffe Pre-Primary School
- Enid Scatliffe Pre-Primary School

The following elementary schools serve Tortola residents:

- Century House Montessori School B.V.I
- Althea Scatliffe Primary School
- Seventh-day Adventist Primary School
- Enis Adams Primary School
- Joyce Samuel Primary School (formerly Belle Vue Primary School)
- Ivan Dawson Primary School
- Leonora Delville Primary School
- Francis Lettsome Primary School
- Alexandrina Maduro Primary School
- Isabella Morris Primary School
- Ebenezer Thomas Primary School
- Willard Wheatley Primary School
- St. Georges Primary School
- Cedar International School
- First Impressions School
- Pelican Gate School
- Agape Total Life Academy

The following High schools serve Tortola Residents:

- Elmore Stout High School (formerly British Virgin Islands High School)
- St George's Secondary School
- Seventh-day Adventist Secondary School
- Cedar International School
- Ansted College and approved Distance University Programs

Eslyn Henley Richiez Learning Centre serves as Tortola's special-needs school. The H. Lavity Stoutt Community College provides Tortola's tertiary education

== Sports ==
Tortola has been one of the Caribbean's prime basketball destinations, hosting three of the last four Caribbean Basketball Championships. Horse racing is also a popular sport in the Virgin Islands, and Tortola's Ellis Thomas Downs is one of the three race tracks in the region.

== Notable people ==
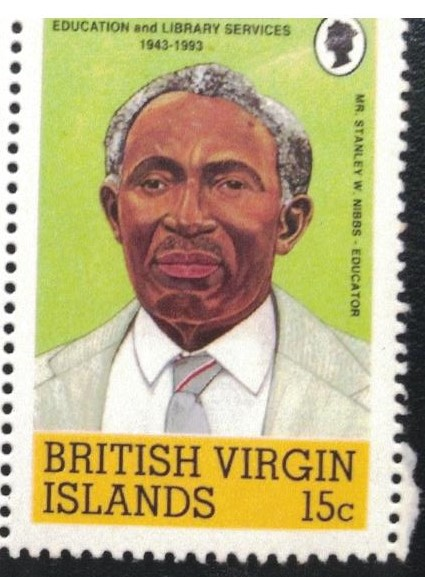
Stanley W. Nibbs' honorary stamp issued in 1993

- J'maal Alexander, Olympic sprinter, was born in Tortola
- Melanie Amaro, lived in Tortola with her grandmother as a child; she was the season 1 winner of the X Factor reality show
- Isaac Glanville Fonseca, early political figure in the British Virgin Islands around the time of the restoration of democracy in 1950
- George French (1817–1881), born and raised in Tortola, was the Chief Justice of Sierra Leone and the British Supreme Court for China and Japan
- D'Moi Hodge, professional basketball player currently playing for the Los Angeles Lakers in the NBA and the South Bay Lakers in the NBA G League
- Samuel Hodge (c. 1840 – 1868), recipient of the Victoria Cross
- Richard Humphreys (philanthropist), silversmith and Founder of Cheyney University, the first historically black institute of higher learning in the United States
- Iyaz, international singing star, is from Carrot Bay, Tortola
- Jon Lucien (1942–2007), vocalist and musician, born Lucien Harrigan on the island of Tortola
- Stanley Nibbs (1914–1985), teacher and one of the first black citizens to appear on a BVI postage stamp

== Images ==
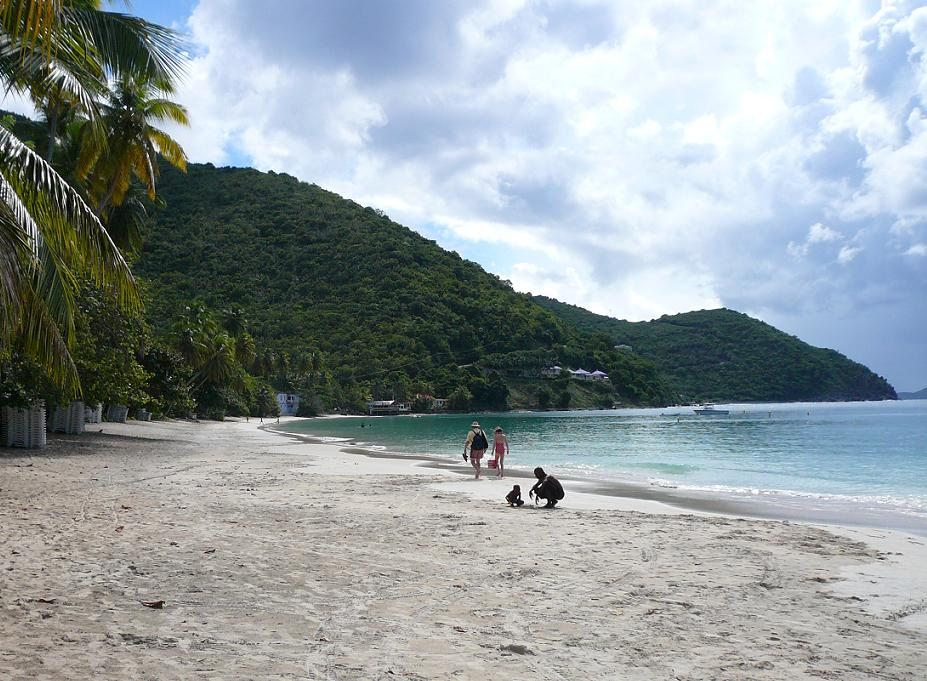
Cane Garden Bay

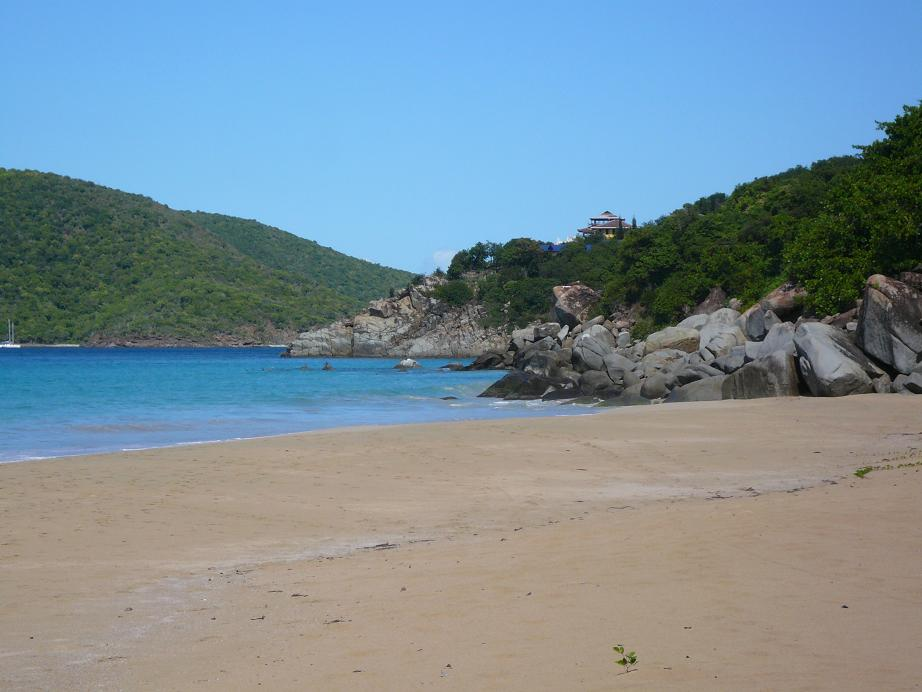
Lambert Beach

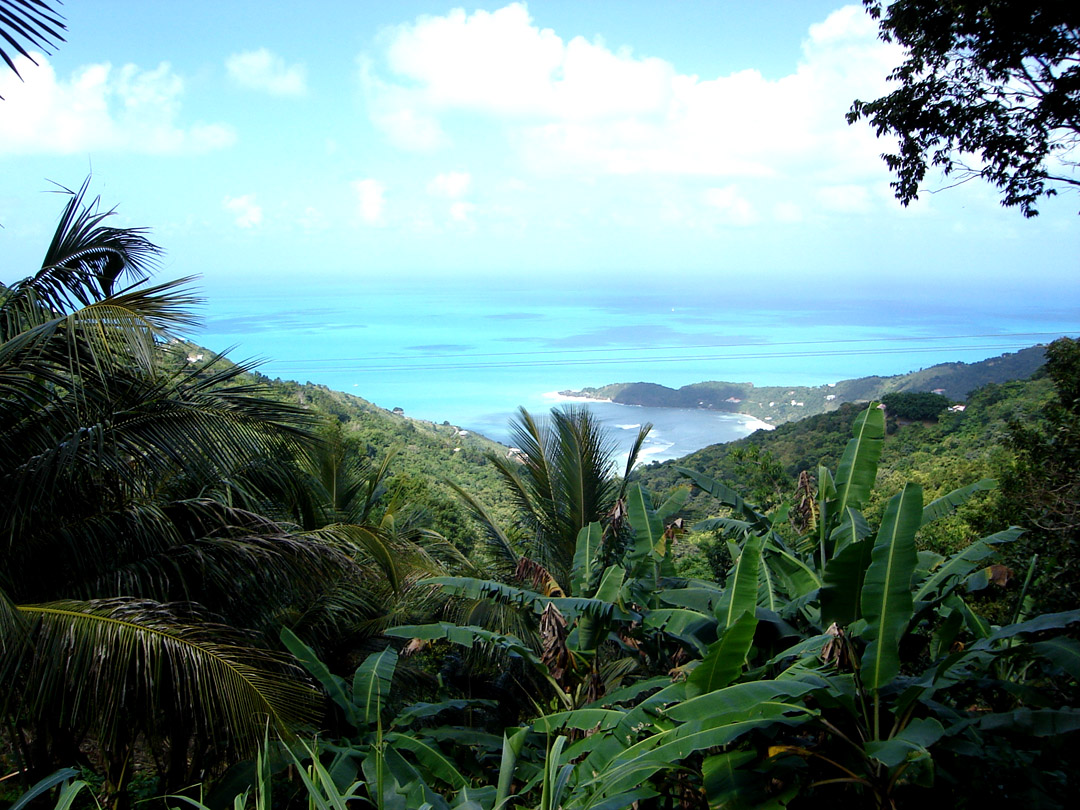
View of the North Coast

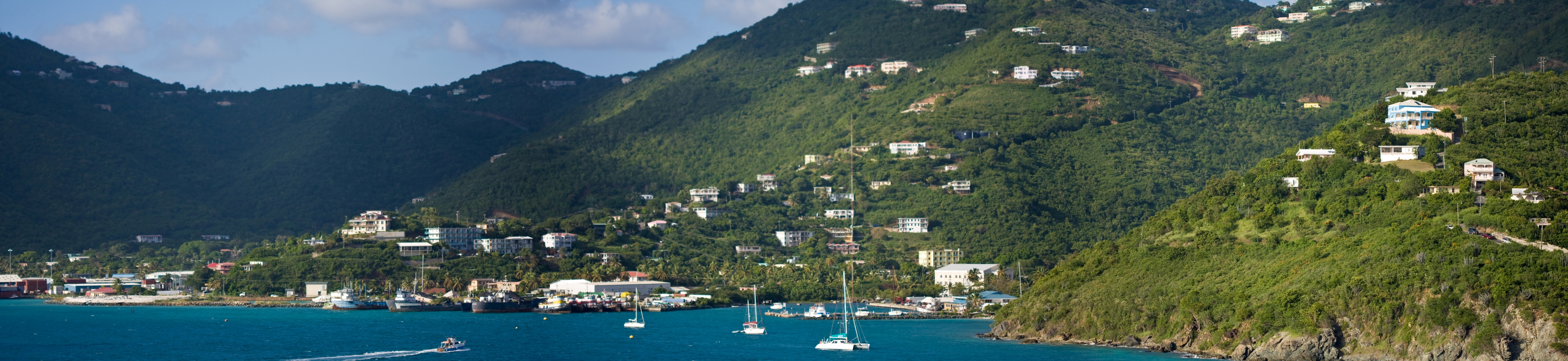
Panoramic View of the Harbour at Road Town

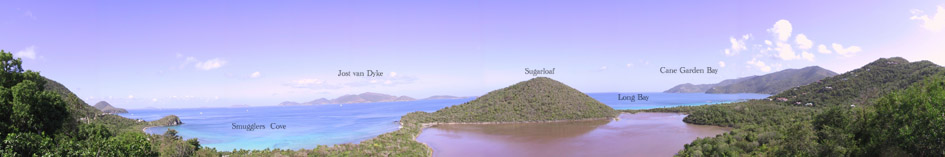
Panoramic View of Jost Van Dyke looking North West from above Smuggler's cove

== See also ==
- British colonization of the Americas
- Dutch colonization of the Americas
