= Christ Lutheran Church on Capitol Hill =

Historic church in Minnesota, United States

- U.S. National Register of Historic Places
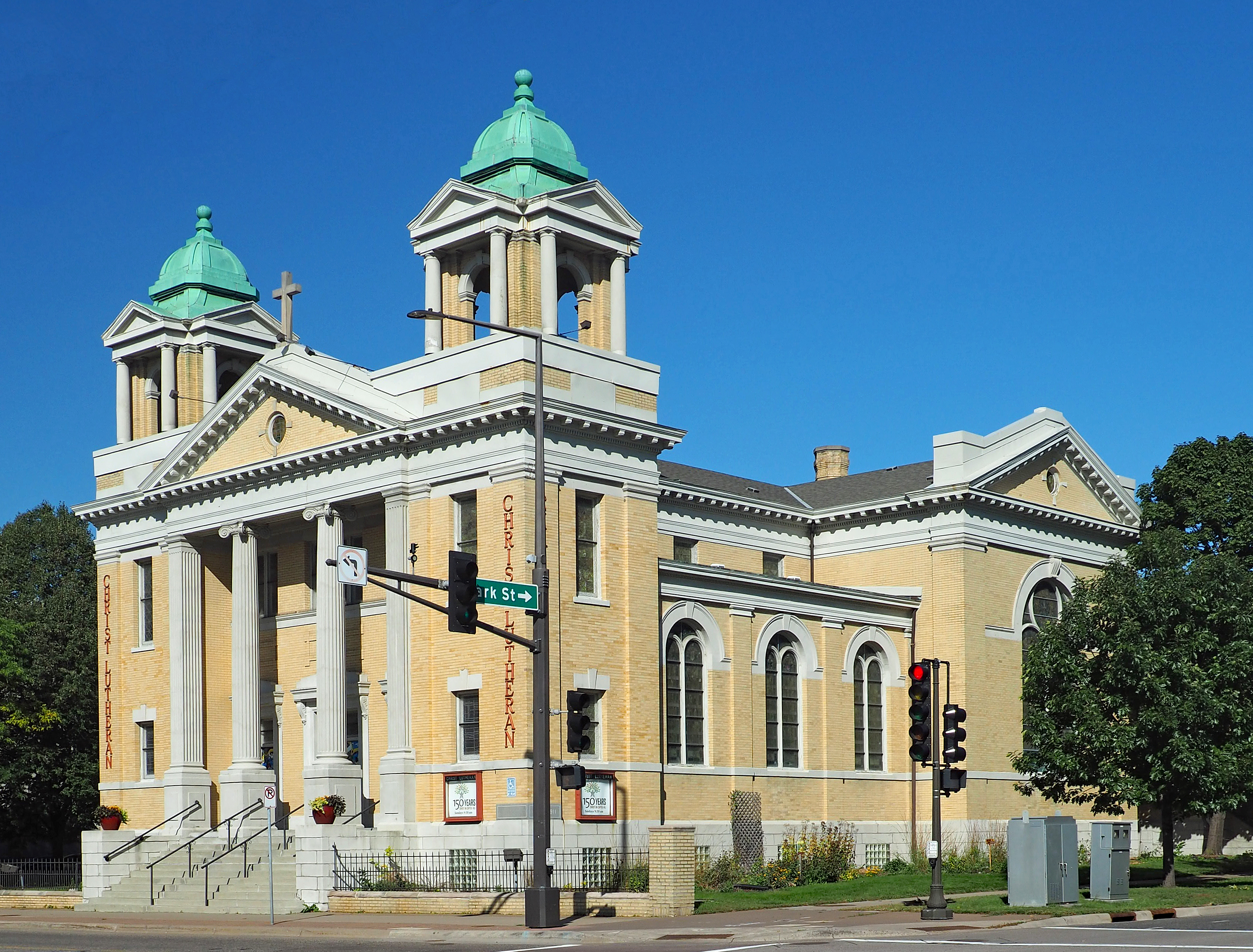
- Christ Lutheran Church on Capitol Hill from the southeast

- Location within Minnesota Location within the United States
- Location: 105 University Avenue West, Saint Paul, Minnesota
- Coordinates: 44°57′22″N 93°06′15″W
- Built: 1909–1915
- Architect: Buechner & Orth
- Architectural style: Beaux-Arts
- NRHP reference No.: 100004655
- Added to NRHP: November 15, 2019

Christ Lutheran Church on Capitol Hill is a congregation of the Evangelical Lutheran Church in America (ELCA) in the Thomas-Dale neighborhood of Saint Paul, Minnesota, United States.

The brick church, built from 1909 to 1915, is atypically designed in Beaux-Arts style by Buechner & Orth to harmonize with the nearby Minnesota State Capitol. It is listed on the National Register of Historic Places.

The oldest part of the building, the north side, was built in 1909. The main church building, facing University Avenue, was constructed in 1915 of yellow brick.

The building's principal facade is symmetrical and features a Classical pediment supported by Ionic columns and pilasters, flanked by bell towers. An office wing, which currently houses the Saint Paul Area Synod of the ELCA, was constructed in 1962–63.

The congregation was formally organized in 1868 as the Scandinavian Lutheran Church Society. Later that year, it was changed from "Society" to "Congregation". In 1869, it was renamed the Norwegian Evangelical Lutheran Church. Services were initially held in members' homes, in the Ramsey County Courthouse, and in the Zion Evangelical Lutheran Church, a German congregation at East 9th and Rosabel Street.

In 1870, the congregation erected its own building at the southwest corner of L'Orient and Mt. Airy Streets. The sandy soil at that site required regular maintenance to keep the building from sliding down the hill, and in 1875, the structure was moved to 13th and Canada Streets.

In 1904, Rev. S.T. Reque began a 37-year tenure as pastor, and in 1909, the current site at Park Street and University Avenue was purchased. The architect, Buechner & Orth, chose an architectural style compatible with the neighboring Minnesota State Capitol. The basement of the new structure was finished for use as a worship space on Christmas Eve 1911. The upper church was dedicated on December 5, 1915.

A few years later, the congregation's name was changed to "Christ Lutheran Church". In 1962, the congregation added the words "on Capitol Hill" to the name to highlight its proximity to the state's seat of civil government.

Baptized membership peaked in 1944 at 1198 persons. The Pastor from 1939–1952, Rev. Joseph Simonson, served as chaplain of the Minnesota Senate for 10 years before being appointed by President Eisenhower as Ambassador to Ethiopia. This led by a visit from Ethiopian Emperor Haile Selassie to Christ Lutheran Church in June 1954. The emperor presented the congregation with a processional cross identical to one presented to the National Cathedral.

In 1953, the church established a Sunday school for developmentally disabled youth. It was a commonly held belief at the time that such youth would not be able to understand the curriculum. But longtime member Arne Kohlstad re-wrote the curriculum in language they could understand. This drew students from other congregations, and some of their families joined the church.

In the 1980s, the church's neighborhood experienced an influx of immigrants and refugees from Southeast Asia and Africa. The congregation responded to these demographic changes by establishing a Southeast Asian Ministry to address the needs of this new population.
