= Mount Sage National Park =

Protected area of the British Virgin Islands

Sage Mountain National Park
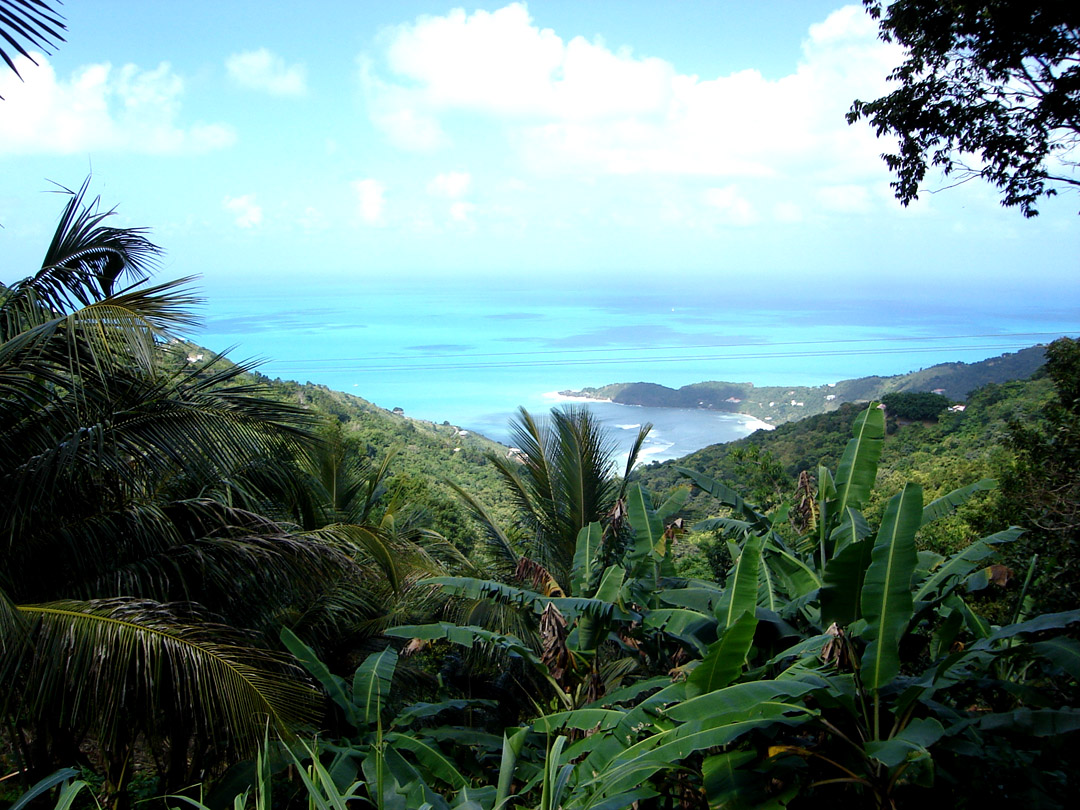
- Forest in Tortola

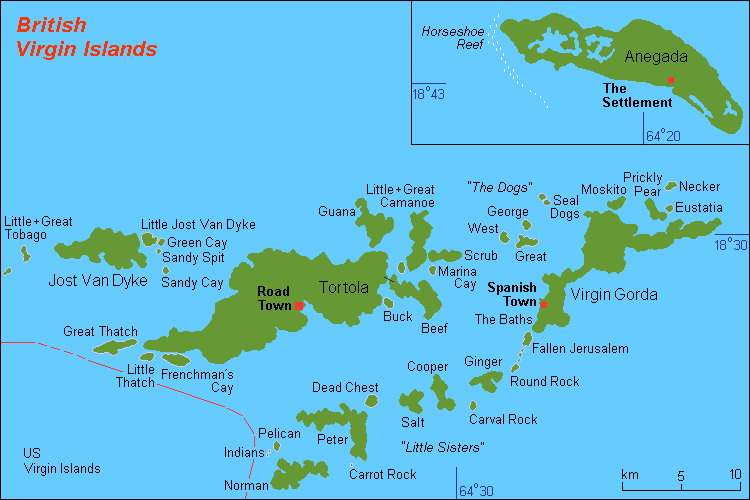
- Location of Sage mountain National Park in Tortola Island
- Location: Road Town, Tortola Islands, Caribbean Sea
- Nearest city: Road Town
- Coordinates: 18°24′N 64°39′W
- Area: 96 acres (39 ha)
- Established: 1964

Sage Mountain National Park is a protected area of the British Virgin Islands. It is named after the highest peak of the island of Tortola, Mount Sage. The Mount Sage volcanic peak rises to a height of 1,716 feet (523 m), and is thus the highest point in all of the Virgin Islands. The park is located to the southwest of the island group's capital, Road Town. The park, which includes the mountain range, extends over an area of 96 acres (39 ha). The vegetation is of semi-rain forest type. There are many trails for trekking and hiking.

== History ==
The national park was established in 1964, covering an area of 35 ha. It was the first national park in the British Virgin Islands to preserve and reserve the remaining forests and its adjoining watershed areas. The reserve area was acquired from private farmers by the Government with a grant provided by Laurance Rockefeller, and was given to the National Park Trust in 1964 for making it a forest reserve for conservation purposes.

== Geography ==
Approach to the national park is from the north west of Road Town along the Joe Hill Road which is the main highway, to Leonards Road and then turning left to the Ridge Road, which leads to the car park at the park entrance. The average park elevation is about 1,000 feet (300 m) above sea level. The topography is dictated by the ridge that runs in an east–west direction in the middle of Tortola Island with elevation range from 750–1,716 feet (229–523 m) between the western end of the island to Mount Sage. The tall, volcanic mountain range acts like a natural barrier, blocking dry winds and strong sun shine. Rains occur from the moist trade winds generated in the Tortola's mountains and falls mostly on the northern side of the park, supporting a few forest species, while the southern part of the park reflect old pastures of dry forests. A small area of 29.5 acres (11.9 ha), which is generally of rocky terrain, retains the original forest species as they could not be cleared for agriculture. Tree plantations already existed, with the plantations of West Indies Mahogany and White Cedar. Over the years, natural regeneration has also taken place.

== Features ==
There is a north coast overlook and a tower, which provides scenic views of Jost Van Dyke, Tobagoes, little Sandy Cay, the north coast and, St. Thomas. Sir Francis Drake Channel of outlying islands from Virgin Gorda to St. John can be seen by a short detour along the Joseph R. O'Neal Trail to the peak. The park has twelve trails forming a circular route; trails are well marked with signs. Trails include the Central Trail, also known as the Rainforest Trail, flanked by the North Trail and the South Trail. The Mahogany Forest Trail, which goes up to the top of Mount Sage, was established by Joseph Reynold O'Neal, the founder and first Chairman of the National Parks Trust. The best preserved forest area is viewable from the Henry Adams Loop Trail, which includes steps.

== Wildlife ==
The old-growth forest on Mount Sage is noted to be "untouched since the time of Columbus". Typical of rainforests, flora includes the "stinking fish" or bullet wood (Mimusops elengi), Caribbean and Honduras mahogany trees (Swietenia mahogoni, and S. macrophylla). Other flora found within the park are guavaberry, large patches of moss, epiphytes or air plants, elephant ear vine (philodendron), fig tree, white "cedar" (not actually a cedar but a flowering tree, Tabebuia heterophylla), a West Indian species of tree fern, manilkara, and mountain guava (Psidium amplexicaule). Groves of mammee apple (Mammea americana) and heliconia trees are also recorded along the entrance path of the park. Some of the ferns, flowers, and vines which grow in the park are not found elsewhere on Tortola.

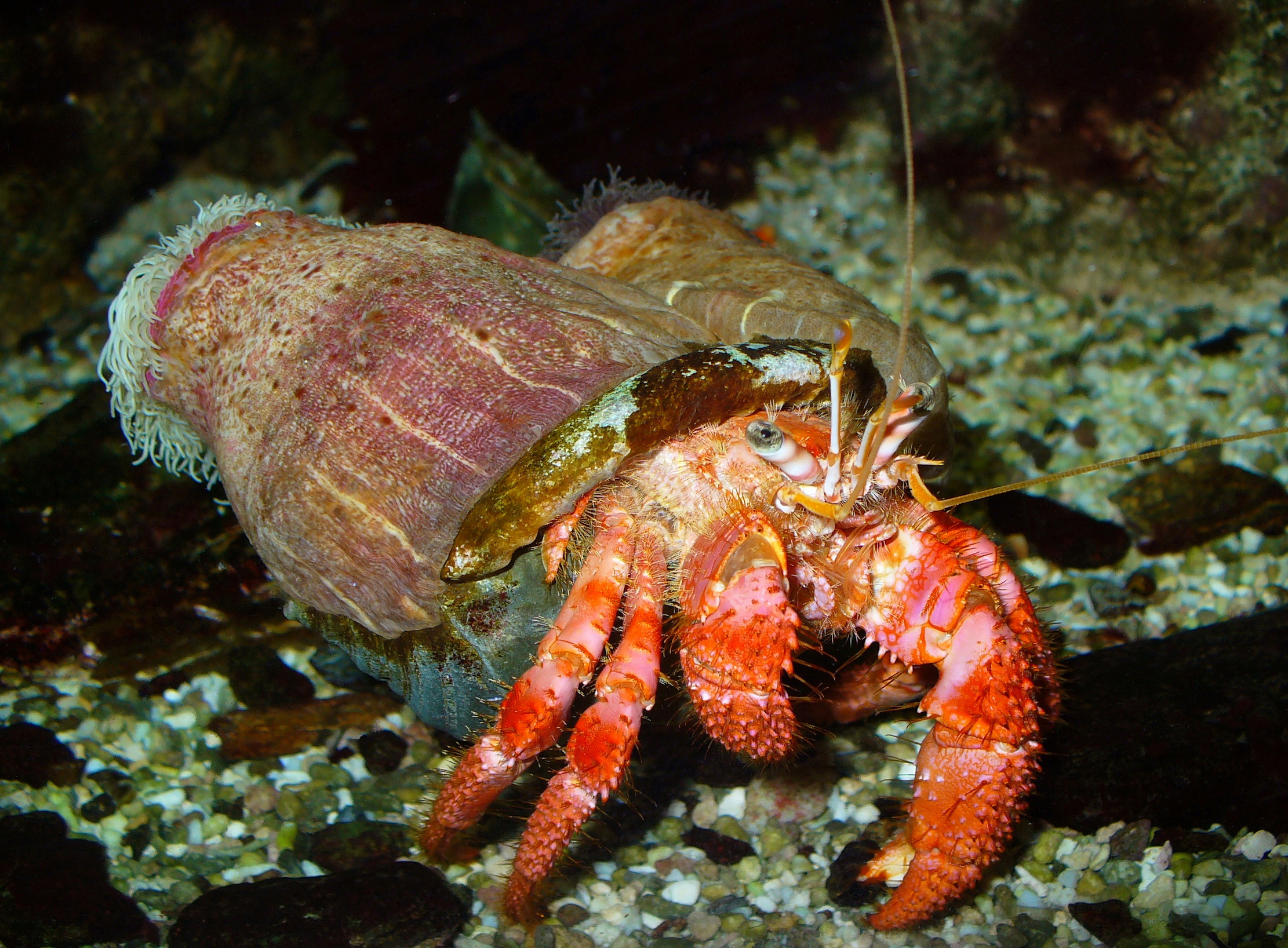
Hermit Crab

Fauna reported from the park are hermit crab (Calliactis). Avifauna includes American kestrel, called kili kili hawk locally, red-tailed hawks, Caribbean martin, mountain dove, and pearly-eyed thrasher.
