= Marjorie Naylor =

New Zealand artist

Marjorie Eleanor Froom Naylor (1908 – 30 January 1985) was a New Zealand artist. Her works are held in the collection of The Suter Art Gallery.

== Biography ==
Naylor was born in Nelson in 1908, and studied art under Hugh Scott. In 1932 Naylor took over from Scott as principal after his retirement from the privately run Nelson School of Painting.

Naylor was an active member of various art societies including the Canterbury Society of Arts, Wellington's Academy of Fine Arts and locally the Nelson Suter Art Society where she served the roles of secretary, committee member and vice-president. Naylor was an accomplished water-colourist and developed a reputation for portraiture.

Naylor had a studio at her home in Bridge Street, Nelson next to the Suburban Bus Company. Her studio was regarded as a local landmark, both for the collection of paintings hanging in the window and for the building. Upon her death, the director of the Suter Art Gallery, Austin Davies, paid tribute to her -

She was a shy, retiring person, a meticulous individual and one liked by many people. The gallery had attempted to mount a one-person show of her work but she was reluctant to be in the public limelight. She was a longstanding member of the Suter Art Society and, although she hadn't exhibited with the society for some time, she was working until shortly before her death.

One of Naylor's best-known portraits is of Perrine Moncrieff, the pioneering environmentalist, ornithologist and craftsperson. In the 1941 artwork, Moncrieff is captured knitting socks for her son who was posted in Egypt during World War Two. Her bonnet is decorated with flowers, a typical expression of her political reviews regarding the conservation of New Zealand's native flora and fauna.

== Exhibitions ==
- Centennial Exhibition of International and New Zealand Art, 1939
- Nelson Suter Art Society, 1938, 1939, 1941
- New Zealand Academy of Fine Arts (Wellington), 1936, 1939, 1941, 1951, 1952
- Otago Art Society, 1933 Sarjeant Gallery, 1946
- Waikato Winter Show, 1940
- Wanganui Arts and Crafts Society, 1946, 1949
