= Lee Hsiu-fen =

Chinese politician

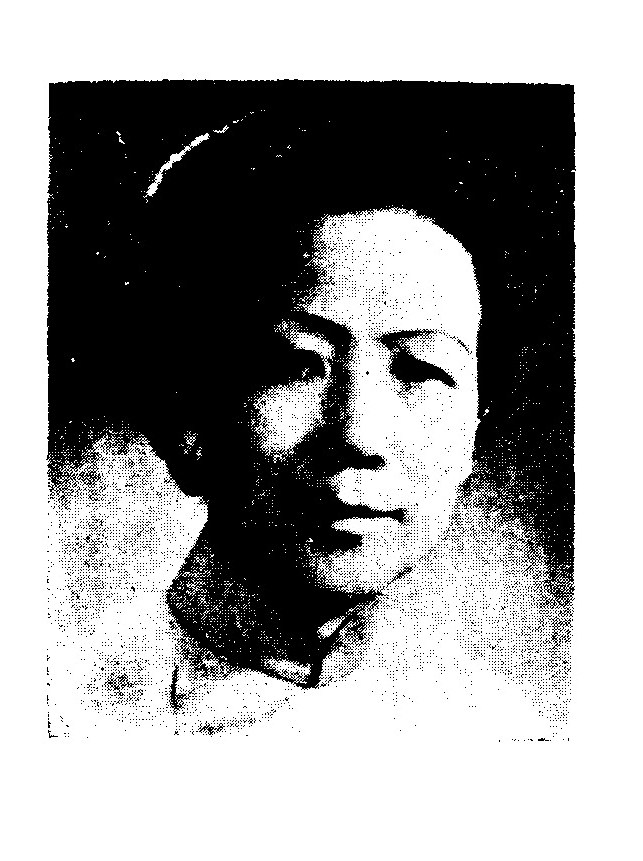
- Lee in 1953

Member of the Legislative Yuan
- In office 1948–1985
- Constituency: Chahar

Personal details
- Born: 28 December 1910
- Died: 18 January 1985 (aged 74)

Lee Hsiu-fen (Chinese: 李秀芬, 28 December 1910 – 18 January 1985) was a Chinese academic and politician. She was among the first group of women elected to the Legislative Yuan in 1948.

== Biography ==
Lee was originally from Huailai County in Chahar Province. After graduating from Peking Normal University, she earned a master's degree at Stanford University in the United States. Returning to China, she became a professor at Guangdong Menqin University and Guangdong Provincial College of Arts & Science. She also served as headteacher of Chongqing China Women's Vocational School.

In the 1948 elections to the Legislative Yuan Lee ran as a Kuomintang candidate in Chahar Province and was elected to parliament. She relocated to Taiwan during the Chinese Civil War, where she became a professor at Chinese Culture University, Tamkang College of Arts and Sciences and Feng Chia Business School. She died in January 1985.
