= Bernard Pask =

English footballer (1936–1985)

Personal information
- Full name: Bernard Pask
- Date of birth: 20 September 1936
- Place of birth: Winchester, England
- Date of death: 27 January 1985 (aged 48)
- Place of death: Romsey, England
- Position: Centre-forward

Youth career
- Pirelli General
- RAMC Crookham

Senior career*
Years	Team	Apps	(Gls)
1958–1960	Southampton	0	(0)
- Basingstoke Town
1962–1967	Salisbury City		(29)
- Whitchurch United
1969–19??	Swaythling Athletic		
- Cowes
19??–1973	Swaythling Athletic		
- * Club domestic league appearances and goals

Bernard Pask (20 September 1936 – 27 January 1985) was an English professional footballer who made one first-team appearance for Southampton in 1960.

== Family ==
Pask was born in the Winchester district, the son of Charles Pask and Agnes Mary Poole. He married Sylvia Sanders in 1958 and they had two children, Deborah and Graham.

== Football career ==
Pask had played for Southampton Schools before joining Pirelli General. He did his National Service in the Royal Army Medical Corps based at Crookham Camp whom he represented at football, where he gained a reputation as a "tricky winger".

He joined Southampton in March 1958, initially as an amateur, before signing his professional contract in September 1958, aged 22. He made his debut in the reserves playing at outside-right against Bristol Rovers on 26 April 1958. He continued to play regularly for the reserves for the next 18 months, before moving to centre-forward in October 1959, where he played 24 matches, scoring 14 goals.

His form earned him a call-up for the first-team, which came on 28 March 1960, when he took the place of Derek Reeves for the semi-final of the Southern Professional Floodlit Cup (the precursor to the Football League Cup) at Coventry City. The match was dominated by the hosts and, although Gordon Brown scored the opener for the "Saints", two goals from Ray Straw saw Coventry through to the final, where they defeated West Ham United to claim the trophy.

Pask continued to play at centre-forward for the reserves until December 1960, scoring six goals in 16 appearances before he was released by the club.

== Later career ==
On leaving Southampton, Pask played for various non-league clubs. He was a trained plumber and became heating manager at Husbands Shipyard at Marchwood. He died on 27 January 1985, aged 48.

== Bibliography ==
- Holley, Duncan; Chalk, Gary (2003). In That Number – A post-war chronicle of Southampton FC. Hagiology Publishing. ISBN 0-9534474-3-X.
