= Ariella Fashion House =

British fashion brand of cocktail

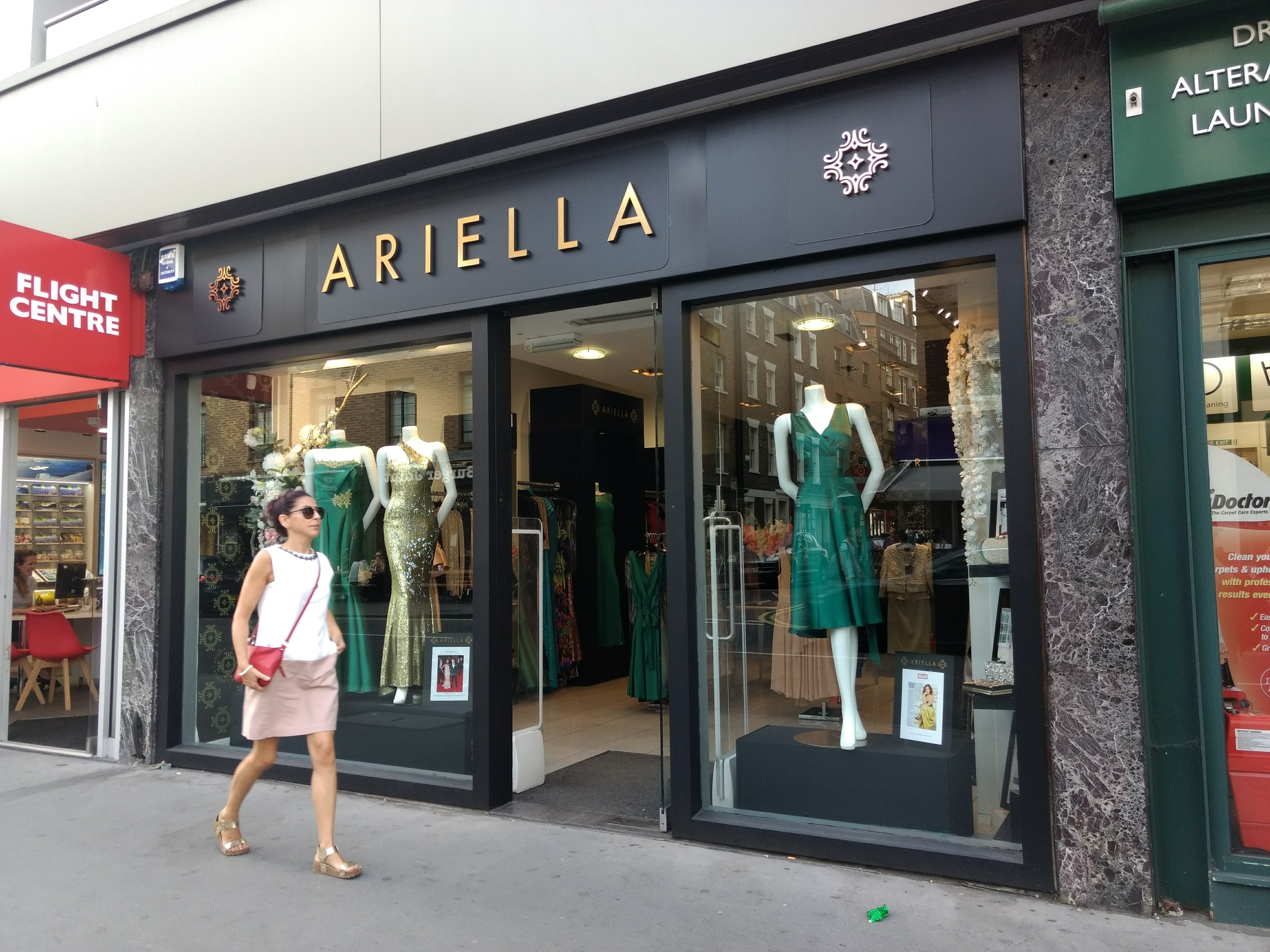
Ariella, Marylebone High Street.

Ariella is a British fashion brand of cocktail, evening and special occasion wear founded in 1966. Ariella designs, manufactures, wholesales and retails women's fashion. Ariella sells under their own labels - retail label Ariella London and designer label Ariella Couture, as well as under clients’ labels. In April 2015 Ariella opened its flagship store in Brent Cross Shopping Centre.

== History ==
Ariella started trading in Carnaby Street, founded by two brothers, Aristos and Achilleas Constantinou. It designed, manufactured and retailed its own designs, expanding to 11 retail outlets in London, as well as franchise stores in Switzerland and USA.

== Trade associations ==
Ariella is a member of various trade associations, including:

- UKFT - The UK Fashion and Textiles Association, the most inclusive British network for fashion and textile companies, of which Ariella's CEO Achilleas Constantinou is a board member.
- FDPA - The Fashion & Design Protection Association, founded by Ariella's CEO Achilleas Constantinou in 1975.
- SEDEX - The Supplier Ethical Data Exchange, a nonprofit membership organization dedicated to driving improvements in responsible and ethical business practices in global supply chains.

== Awards and honours ==
Ariella won a number of awards, including: The Queen's Award for Export Achievement 1998, UK Fashion Export Award 2008, two IPC Woman Fashion Awards, UKFT Export Awards 2010, and HSBC Business Thinking 2010 Competition for the London Region.
