= Leopold Pars =

British mathematician (1896–1985)

- Born: 2 January 1896; Whittlesford, England
- Died: 28 January 1985 (aged 89); Acton, England
- Occupation: Applied Mathematician
- Years active: 1921-1965
- Notable work: Treatise on analytical dynamics (1965)

Leopold Alexander "Alan" Pars (2 January 1896 – 28 January 1985) was a British applied mathematician. He is most remembered for his textbooks Introduction to dynamics (1953), Calculus of variations (1962), and his monumental 650 page Treatise on analytical dynamics (1965).

He was the son of an accountant, and grew up in Shepherd's Bush with his two siblings. He was educated at Hammersmith, where he excelled at mathematics and track-and-field. He won a Foundation Scholarship in Mathematics and Physics to study at Jesus College, Cambridge. He matriculated in 1915, and would spend the rest of his adult life there. Due to serious health problems, he was unable to take the first-year exam (Mathematical Tripos) until late 1917. Between frequent bouts of ill-health, he was a popular actor and maintained a vigorous fitness routine, gaining a reputation for mountaineering and winning the multi-university mile race.

In 1921, shortly after finishing his M.Sc., he wrote a two-part essay on tensor field geometry as applied to Einstein's recent theory of General relativity (1915) which won the Smith's Prize, and led almost immediately to a fellowship at Jesus College where he remained as a lifelong bachelor for the next 61 years. He dedicated himself primarily to teaching, becoming "a teacher and lecturer of great skill and clarity whose range ... was beyond the reach of most of his younger colleagues in the faculty." He also had multiple long-term administrative positions, and had relatively few publications during this phase of his career; it wasn't until retiring from his most demanding teaching and administration assignments that he published his three major books. He retired as president of Jesus College in 1964, but remained "a familiar sight in Cambridge, taking his regular afternoon constitutional... a great Cambridge character, a survivor of an era which is passing from living memory" until his death in 1985.
