= Virginia Tucker =

American mathematician

Virginia Layden Tucker
- Born: 1909; Hertford, North Carolina
- Died: January 19, 1985 (aged 75)
- Education: North Carolina College for Women
- Employers: NACA (1935–1948); Northrop Corporation (1948–1965)
- Organization: Society of Women Engineers

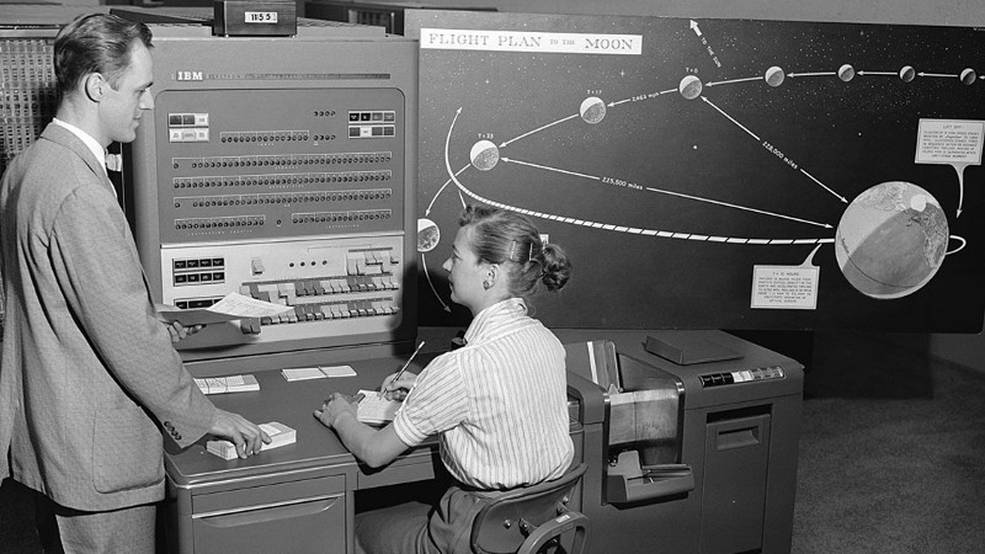
Human computer with IBM (1959)

Virginia Layden Tucker (1909 – January 19, 1985) was an American mathematician whose work at the National Advisory Committee for Aeronautics (NACA), the precursor to NASA, allowed engineers to design and improve upon airplanes. Tucker was one of the first human computers at the NACA, served as a recruiter for the program, and later worked as an aerodynamicist and an advocate for women in mathematics.

== Life and career ==
Tucker was born in Hertford, North Carolina in 1909. She was the valedictorian of Perquimans High School's first graduating class in 1926 and is an alumna of the North Carolina College for Women where she graduated in 1930 with a B.A. in mathematics and a minor in education.

Tucker spent the next four years as a high school mathematics teacher in her hometown. In 1935, she was recruited to work at the Langley Memorial Aeronautical Laboratory (now Langley Research Center), the main research center for the National Advisory Committee for Aeronautics, at the time. Tucker was one of five women from around the country recruited to be part of Langley's first "computer pool". As human computers, these women were responsible for processing the large amounts of data gathered from flight, wind tunnel, and aeronautical tests conducted at the facility, as the NACA did not have electrical computers at the time.

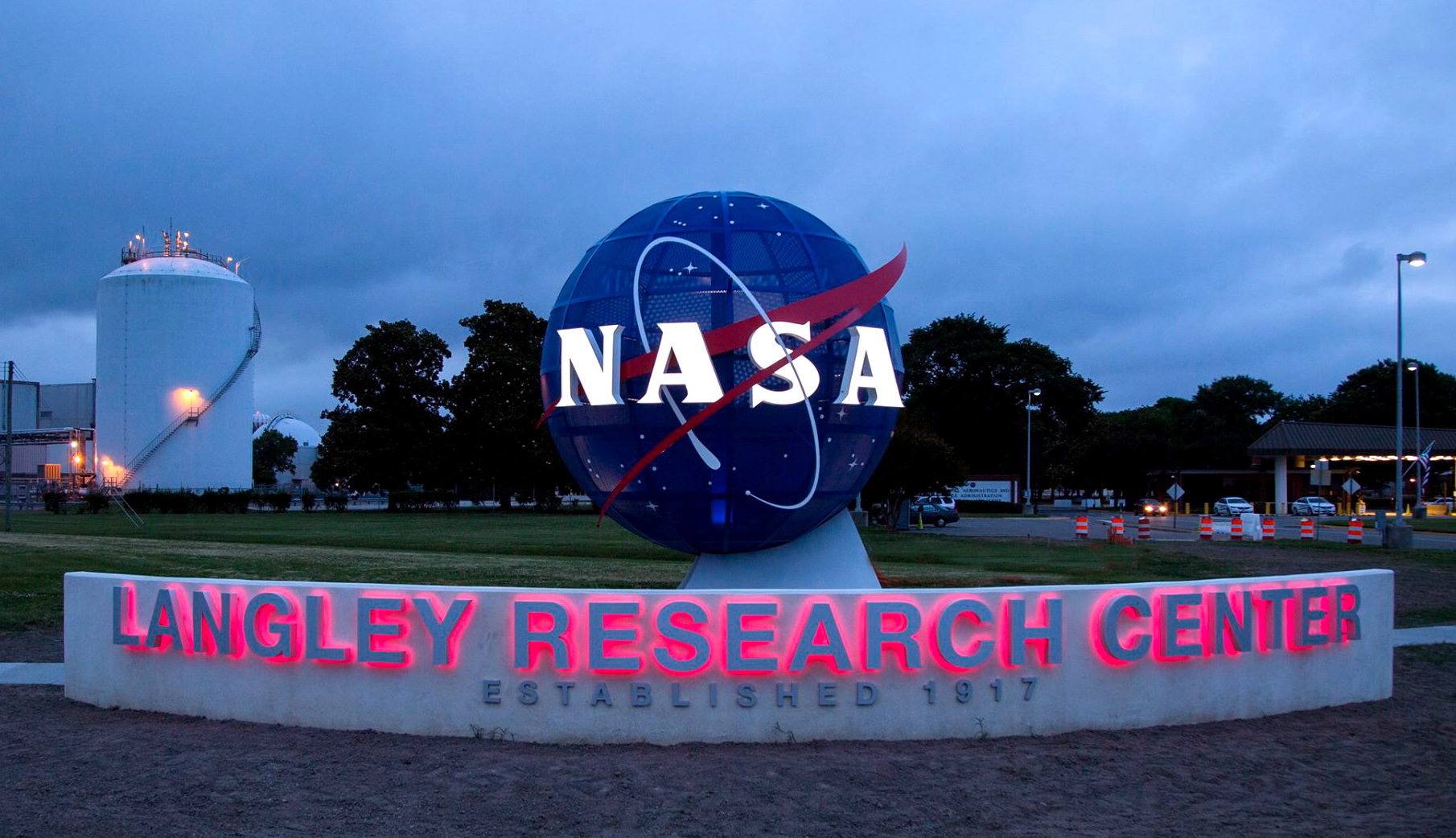
NASA Langley Research Center (2017)

As World War II began in 1939, the rapid development of aeronautical technologies became a main priority of the U.S. Military and as a result, the demand for human computers at Langley grew rapidly. Tucker traveled across the country (particularly the South) recruiting and training female mathematicians for the program.

In 1946, Tucker was promoted to the position of Overall Supervisor for Computing at Langley overseeing around 400 female "human computers", many of whom she recruited.

In 1948, Tucker left the NACA to become a researcher at the Northrop Corporation. She also became an advocate for women in engineering, working as the director of the Los Angeles Section of the Society of Women Engineers (SWE) chair of SWE's National Finance Committee from 1955 to 1956, and as SWE's representative to the Los Angeles Technical Societies Council in 1957.

Tucker left Northrop after 17 years and returned to North Carolina where she became the supervisor of a local school system until her retirement in 1974.

Virginia Tucker died on January 19, 1985, at the age of 75.

== See also ==
- Hidden Figures
- Grace Hopper
- Katherine Johnson
- Women in computing
