= Joseph Simonson =

Lutheran pastor

Joseph Simonson (1904 – January 17, 1985) was a Lutheran pastor and the American ambassador to Ethiopia (1953–1957).

== Biography ==
Simonson was a resident of the Minneapolis suburb of Richfield, Minnesota. He was chaplain of the Minnesota Senate from 1941 to 1951 and gave invocations at the National Republican Conventions in 1944 and 1952. He was the pastor of Christ Lutheran Church on Capitol Hill, St. Paul, Minnesota, from 1939 to 1952.

He received degrees from St. Olaf College in 1925, Luther Theological Seminary in 1931, and studied law at George Washington University from 1926-1928.

== Ethiopia ==
Among his concerns while Ambassador was the “Danger of Communist Penetration”, Yugoslav-Ethiopian relations, the Muslim Minority and relationships with the West. Edward W.Clark, Consular Officer in Asmara (1953-1956), said in an interview when asked about Simonson and negotiations surrounding Eritrea said “He really didn't know what he was doing. ... He was not involved in it. He was unfortunate.” Richard Nixon was Vice President at the time and had toured Africa. When he returned, Nixon said “that there was one meatball ambassador that has to go, and that was Simonson as it turned out. A terrible thing to say but...”
