= Melvin Judkins =

American physician

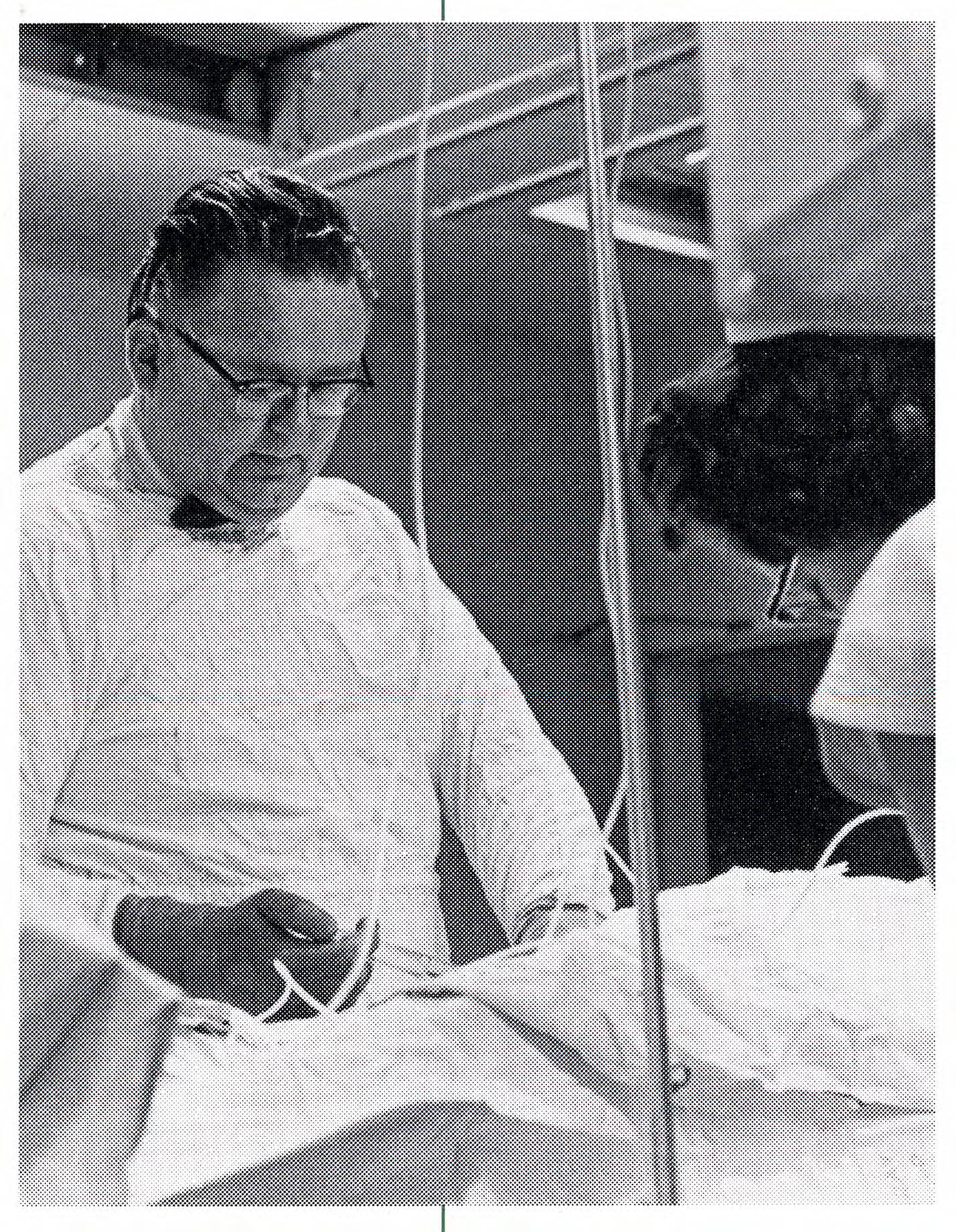
- Judkins performing a catheterization procedure with the aid of a female nurse
- Born: Melvin Paul Judkins; May 3, 1922
- Died: January 28, 1985 (aged 62)
- Burial place: Riverside National Cemetery, Riverside, California
- Occupation: Physician
- Known for: Judkins catheter, coronary angiography
- Medical career
- Field: Radiology

Melvin Paul Judkins (May 3, 1922 – January 28, 1985) was an American physician known for his pioneering contributions to the field of radiology, with techniques and devices that played a part in the early development of the fields of interventional radiology and interventional cardiology. He developed specialized pre-shaped catheters to reach the coronary vessels via the aorta. Today, they are commonly used and known as Judkins catheters.

== Early life and education ==
Judkins grew up near Los Angeles, California. Born into a family of medical professionals, including his father who was a physical therapist, Judkins developed a love for working with his hands. He received his Bachelor of Science in 1945 from Loma Linda University College of Arts and Sciences in Riverside, California, for his pre-medical courses. During that time, he worked in paper delivery, construction, tutoring, and, during WWII, wiring Liberty ships at the Kaiser Shipyards to pay for his early education. He continued on his path by enrolling at La Sierra college in an accelerated program which eventually led him to the College of Medical Evangelists, where he began his medical education. His educational expenses were supplemented by the Army and his continued work at the Kaiser Shipyards.

He spent his first year after education at Loma Linda Hospital (1946–1947) for his internship which was followed up by his specialty training in Urology. After a brief appointment as chief urologist, commissioned by the Army during WWII, at the Urology Section of the 28th General Hospital in Osaka, Japan, he and his wife started a private family medicine practice in Sumas, Washington. Here they built the practice from the bottom up, with Eileen acting as a physician's assistant, laboratory and x-ray technician, and taking care of the finances. Over time, the business expanded and the hours became demanding so they decided to return to California and establish a larger practice with more physicians, nurses, and dedicated staff in Antioch.

== Contributions to medicine ==
Growing disinterested in the routines of family practice, Judkins was convinced by a family physician friend, who had chosen to pursue radiology, to consider greener pastures. As a 40-year-old physician, finding a residency was proving to be difficult. After being rejected from Mayo Clinic, he moved to Portland, Oregon, to study radiology at University of Oregon Medical School (UOMS) under the leadership of Dr. Charles T. Dotter, known today as the father of interventional radiology. Dotter pioneered the understanding of catheter stented angiography. This became of particular interest to Judkins as well and they worked together to study and develop percutaneous transluminal dilatation of narrowed peripheral arteries. This procedure pioneered what would later develop into contemporary transluminal angioplasty techniques.

He continued his understanding of angiography at the Cleveland Clinic under Dr. F. Mason Sones, who focused on arteriography via the brachial artery and then at the University of Lund in Sweden under the guidance of radiologist Dr. Sven Seldinger. It was in Sweden where he helped develop the "hooktail" (U-shaped) catheter which was used to personalize each guidewire and catheter to the shape of each patient's aorta. He brought these new-found techniques back to UOMS in 1966 and started working to simplify the procedure to perform it without the use of general anesthesia to decrease the complications and risk associated. At this time, he was given the post of associate professor of radiology which came with the benefits of a newly fitted laboratory where he worked with colleagues to utilize these techniques to develop selective coronary catheterization. Over time, his namesake, the Judkins catheter, was developed using a heat-fixation method which permanently set the shape of a stiff wire inside of a catheter. He published these findings in Radiology in 1967 and by 1968, his preshaped Judkins catheters were being commercially produced.

== Late years ==
By 1969, he was promoted to the position of Director of Cardiovascular Radiology at UOMS and was subsequently offered a post as faculty at Loma Linda University. He took this offer and moved with his wife back to California, and took the positions of chair of the Department of Radiation Sciences and director of the cardiovascular laboratories from 1970–1978, during which time his labs were frequented by physicians from around the world. Judkins retired from active teaching in 1978 after suffering a stroke. He then continued to author several scientific articles alongside his wife, Eileen and spent his last years cultivating his love for model trains.

=== Death ===
Judkins died on January 28, 1985, at 62 years of age.

=== Personal ===
Judkins married Eileen Cobb in 1946, who worked as a student nurse at Loma Linda. Judkins and his father-in-law died on the same day.
