= Esme Haywood =

English cricketer

Personal information
- Full name: Esme Thomas Lancelot Reed Haywood
- Born: 23 August 1900; East Preston, West Sussex, England
- Died: 8 January 1985 (aged 84); Fownhope, Herefordshire, England
- Batting: Right-handed
- Role: Batsman

Domestic team information
- Years: Team
- 1925–1927: Somerset
- First-class debut: 13 June 1925 Somerset v Sussex
- Last First-class: 31 May 1927 Somerset v Middlesex

Career statistics
Competition	First-class
Matches	8
Runs scored	137
Batting average	8.56
100s/50s	–/–
Top score	38
Balls bowled	–
Wickets	–
Bowling average	–
5 wickets in innings	–
10 wickets in match	–
Best bowling	–
Catches/stumpings	1/–
- Source: CricketArchive, 9 February 2011

Esme Thomas Lancelot Reed Haywood (23 August 1900 – 8 January 1985) played first-class cricket for Somerset in 1925 and 1927. He was born at East Preston, Sussex and died at Fownhope, Herefordshire. He disliked his first name and was generally known as "Tom Haywood".

Haywood was educated at Cheltenham College. As a cricketer, he was a right-handed middle-order batsman. He played for Somerset in seven first-class matches across the middle of the 1925 season, but achieved a degree of success only in the first two of them. In his debut match against Sussex at Horsham he scored 38 in the second innings, and this was to be his highest first-class score. Then in the following game at The Oval against Surrey, he made 14 and 36, though Somerset were trounced by a Surrey side that included three century-makers. Haywood reached double figures in only one further innings and he was no more successful when he returned for a single match for Somerset in 1927.
