= Robert Odeman =

German actor and musician (1904–1985)

Martin Hoyer, known by his stage name Robert T. Odeman (30 November 1904 – 14 January 1985), was a gay German classical pianist, actor, writer, and composer who was persecuted by the Nazi regime.

== Early life ==
Odeman was born Martin Hoyer in the town of Blankenese, later quarter of Hamburg. He took the stage name Robert T. Odeman when he began his career as an actor and musician.

After training to become a carpenter, Odeman studied classical piano, successfully performing throughout Europe for several years as a pianist. He played accompaniments for silent films in many cinemas in Hamburg. After suffering a hand injury, Odeman was forced to give up piano playing, and turned to theatre.

In 1922, at the age of 18, Odeman met his first love, architecture student Martin Ulrich Eppendorf (died 1932), who went by the name Muli. The two shared a close relationship for 10 years until Muli's death. A year after Muli’s death, in 1933, Odeman became musical director of the New Theater in Hamburg. In 1935, Odeman opened a cabaret in Hamburg, which was shut down a year later by the Nazis, who claimed it was politically subversive.

== Life in Nazi Germany ==
Odeman's boyfriend, a bookseller, was pressured by the Gestapo to denounce him in 1937, and he was arrested under Paragraph 175, which outlawed homosexual acts between men. Odeman was sentenced to 27 months in prison, which he spent first in Plötzensee and then in various Berlin prisons. After his release in 1940, Odeman was subject to a Berufsverbot forbidding him from carrying on certain professions, and he was not permitted to appear in public. He also remained under police surveillance.

Odeman continued to carry on a relationship with the singer Olga Rinnebach, but in 1942 he was again arrested under Paragraph 175 and sent to Sachsenhausen concentration camp where he was assigned an office job. During a forced march from the camp towards the Baltic Sea in April 1945, he escaped with other homosexual concentration camp prisoners.

== Life after the war ==
After the war, Odeman focused on cultural activities, completing training as an actor and appearing in various theatres and productions. He also wrote many satirical poems, which were released in book form, and were later put to music by musicians such as Charles Kálmán and Norbert Schultze and released on musical and spoken records, with Odeman himself performing on the latter at the suggestion of actresses Pamela Wedekind and Ursula Herking.

In 1959, Odeman met the 25-year-old Günter Nöring (1933-2006), with whom he lived until his death. Since the two were unable to marry, Odeman adopted his younger partner. After the adoption, Nöring used the name Günter Odeman-Nöring.

== Death ==
Robert T Odeman died in the Berlin-Grunewald district of Berlin in 1985, at the age of 80.
