= John Purdue (cricketer) =

New Zealand cricketer

Personal information
- Full name: John William Purdue
- Born: 13 June 1910; Invercargill, Southland, New Zealand
- Died: 25 January 1985 (aged 74); Invercargill, Southland, New Zealand

Domestic team information
- Years: Team
- 1934/35: Southland
- 1938/39: Otago
- Source: ESPNcricinfo, 21 May 2016

John William Purdue (13 June 1910 – 25 January 1985) was a New Zealand sportsman. He played two first-class matches for Otago during the 1938–39 season and played rugby union for Southland.

Purdue was born at Invercargill in Southland in 1910. He played cricket for Southland in the Hawke Cup during 1934–35 and played for the provincial side against the touring England team during the following season. His first-class debut came for Otago against Wellington at Christmas 1938. Opening the bowling, Purdue took a single wicket in the match. During the New Year period he played his other first-class match, taking two wickets against Auckland.

As a rugby player, Purdue played as a half-back for Invercargill and played over 50 provincial matches for Southland. He played for South Island and was nominated for an All Black trial during the 1939 season.

Professionally Purdue worked as a cabinetmaker. He died at Invercargill in 1985 aged 74.
