= Marie Heffenisch =

Luxembourgian women's rights activist

- Born: 14 October 1902
- Died: 9 January 1985 (aged 82)
- Spouse: Sebastian Carmes
- Children: 1

Nathalie Marie Olga Heffenisch (also referred to as Maria and Marie Carmes-Heffenisch; 14 October 1902 – 9 January 1985) was a Luxembourg human rights activist. She was arrested and sent to a women's prison camp for using a hotel as an underground hub for illegal newspapers and escapees during the Nazi Regime.

== Career ==
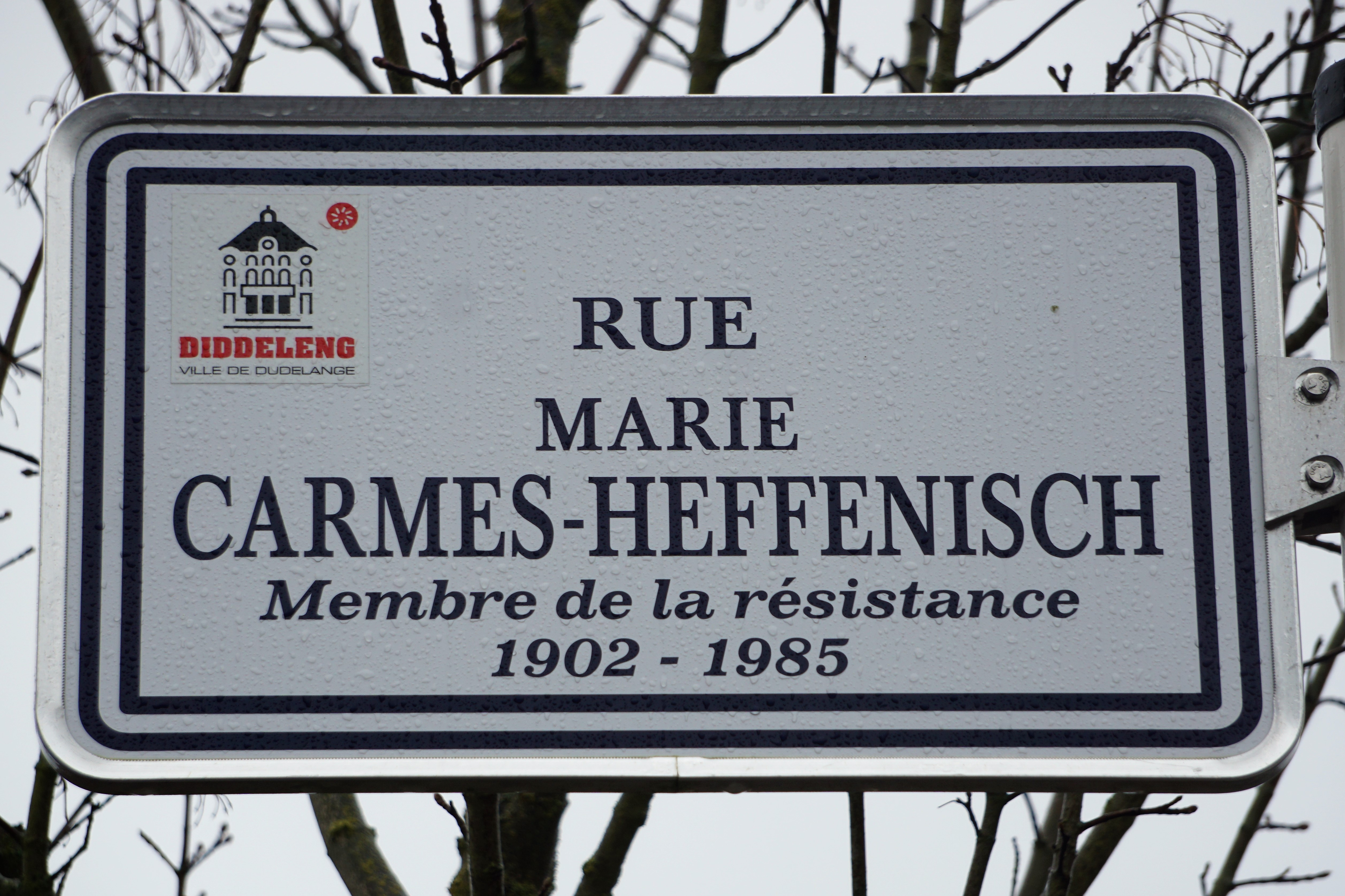
Street named after her

Heffenisch was born on 14 October 1902 in Colmar-Berg. She moved to Dudelange in 1932 and took over Hôtel Hengesch, which was later used as a transshipment point for the Luxembourg Freedom Federation (LFB). She swiftly made the hotel an underground hub for illegal newspapers and escapees. She was caught on 17 June 1944 and deported to Ravensbrück concentration camp. Upon her liberation, on 24 April 1945, she was awarded the "Médaille de l'Ordre de la Resistance." Heffenisch died on 9 January 1985.
