= Herbert Hambleton =

English footballer

Personal information
- Full name: Herbert Adolph Hambleton
- Date of birth: 25 April 1896
- Place of birth: Barrackpore, British India
- Date of death: 1 January 1985 (aged 88)
- Place of death: Hyssington, Wales
- Position: Forward

International career
Years	Team	Apps	(Gls)
1920	Great Britain	0	(0)

Brigadier Herbert Hambleton CBE (25 April 1896 – 1 January 1985) was an English soldier who served in World War I and World War II.

Hambleton was also a cricketer, golfer, and footballer. He was part of Great Britain's squad for the football tournament at the 1920 Summer Olympics, but he did not play in any matches.

Hambleton was awarded with an Officer of the Order of the British Empire (OBE) in the 1919 Birthday Honours. He was made a Commander of the Order of the British Empire in 1945. Hambleton also served as aide-de-camp to Sir Tom Bridges when he was Governor of South Australia.
