= Penelope Johnson Allen =

American journalist (1886–1985)

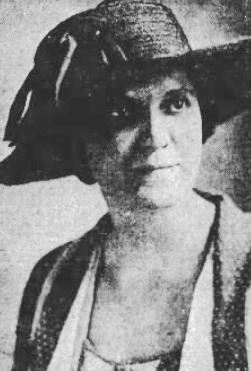
- Penelope Johnson Allen, from a 1922 publication.
- Born: Penelope Van Dyke Johnson; October 27, 1886; Chattanooga, Tennessee, U.S.
- Died: January 9, 1985 (age 98); Chattanooga, Tennessee, U.S.
- Occupation(s): Local historian, clubwoman, writer, educator, journalist

Penelope Johnson Allen (October 27, 1886 – January 9, 1985), born Penelope Van Dyke Johnson, was an American newspaper columnist and local historian. In the 1930s, she led a Works Progress Administration project to collect and copy county records in Tennessee, preserving many genealogical and other records. She wrote a popular family history column for the Chattanooga Times, "Leaves of the Family Tree".

== Early life ==
Penelope Van Dyke Johnson was born in Chattanooga, Tennessee, the daughter of James Whiteside Johnson and Sue Coffin Cleage Johnson. Her father was a county official. She graduated from Chattanooga High School in 1904, and attended Western College in Oxford, Ohio.

== Career ==
Johnson taught school as a young woman, before she married. During World War I, she worked at a DuPont munitions factory in Penniman, Virginia. After the war, she worked at a newspaper in Chattanooga, as a reporter on various beats (including sports). In 1922, she ran unsuccessfully for a seat in the Tennessee state legislature.

Allen became a genealogy columnist for the Chattanooga Times, where her column "Leaves of the Family Tree" provided detailed accounts of notable Southern families, including Cherokee families, which was a particular interest of hers. During the 1930s she headed a state-wide project to collect and copy county records, funded by the Works Progress Administration. She wrote books including Tennessee Soldiers in the Revolution (1935), Guide Book of Chattanooga and Vicinity (1935, a pamphlet compiled for the Tennessee chapter of the DAR), Manuscript of the History of the Cherokee Indians, Particularly the Chickamauga Group (1935), Tennessee soldiers in the War of 1812 (1947), and Leaves from the Family Tree (1982, a collection of her newspaper columns).

Allen was a member of the Tennessee Historical Commission, state press chair for the Tennessee Federation of Women's Clubs, and state historian of the Tennessee chapter of the Daughters of the American Revolution (DAR). She was also active in the DAR at the national level. In 1970, a portrait of Allen was unveiled at the annual dinner of the Chattanooga Area Historical Association, and donated to the Tennessee State Library.

== Personal life ==
Penelope Johnson married Samuel Boyd Allen. They had a daughter, Penelope Allen Moore. She was widowed when Samuel Allen died in 1932. Penelope Johnson Allen died in 1985, aged 98 years, in Chattanooga. Her personal collection of papers related to Cherokee history is in the Tennessee State Library and Archives. Another collection of hers, papers related to the Brainerd Mission, is archived at the University of Tennessee at Chattanooga.
