= Arthur John Grattan-Bellew =

Irish lawyer and colonial administrator (1903–1985)

Sir Arthur John Grattan-Bellew CMG QC

Chief Secretary of Tanganyika
- In office 1956–1959
- Preceded by: Sir Robert de S. Stapleton
- Succeeded by: Sir John Fletcher-Cooke

Attorney General of Tanganyika
- In office 1952–1956

Attorney General of Sarawak
- In office 1948–1952

Personal details
- Born: 23 May 1903
- Died: 5 January 1985 (aged 81)
- Children: 2
- Education: Christ’s College, Cambridge
- Occupation: Lawyer and colonial administrator

Sir Arthur John Grattan-Bellew (23 May 1903 – 5 January 1985) was an Irish lawyer and colonial administrator who was Attorney General of Sarawak from 1948 to 1952; Attorney General of Tanganyika from 1952 to 1956, and Chief Secretary of Tanganyika from 1956 to 1959.

== Early life and education ==
Grattan-Bellew was born in Ireland, the fourth son of Sir Henry Christopher Grattan-Bellew, 3rd Baronet, and Lady Sophia Forbes, daughter of the 7th Earl of Granard, Order of St Patrick. He was educated at Downside School and Christ’s College, Cambridge. He was called to the Bar at Lincoln’s Inn in 1925.

== Career ==
After qualifying, Grattan-Bellew began his legal career practising in London where he remained from 1925 to 1935. While there he was one of the editors of the classic Bullen & Leake on Precedents of Pleadings. In 1936, he joined the legal service of the Egyptian Government where he served until 1938 when the policy of replacing foreign officers by Egyptians was introduced. He then joined the Colonial Legal Service in Malaya with the appointment of First Magistrate, Straits Settlements. In 1941, he joined the military service and was captured by the Japanese and incarcerated as a POW.

After the war, he resumed legal service in Malaya as crown counsel, Federated Malay States and later legal counsel, Federation of Malaya, and on occasion served as acting Solicitor General. In 1948, he was appointed Attorney General of Sarawak where he was in office from 1948 to 1952. While serving there he introduced legislation levying income tax. In 1952, he joined the legal service in Tanganyika where he was Attorney General from 1952 to 1956 and Chief Secretary of Tanganyika from 1956 to 1959. He then served as legal adviser at the Foreign and Commonwealth Office from 1959 to 1971, and later became chairman of Bellew, Parry and Raven Group, Lloyds brokers.

== Personal life and death ==
Grattan-Bellew married Freda Mary Mahony in 1931 and they had a son and a daughter.

Grattan-Bellew died on 5 January 1985, aged 81.

== Honours ==
Grattan-Bellew was appointed a Companion of the Order of St Michael and St George (CMG) in the 1956 New Year Honours. He was created a Knight Bachelor in the 1959 Birthday Honours.
