= Aristos Constantinou =

1985 murder case in England

Aristos Constantinou

Aristos Constantinou (Greek: Άριστος Κωνσταντίνου; 7 June 1944 – 1 January 1985) was the founder of the Ariella fashion label. The Ariella label came to prominence during the British fashion revolution, and was known for its cocktail, evening, and occasionwear and casino uniforms.

Aristos opened a workshop upstairs at 45 Carnaby Street in 1966, and used the label ‘designed by Aristos’. In 1971, he was joined by his brother Achilleas, who runs the company to this day. Together, they expanded the business to Duke Street, Oxford Street, Newburgh Street and more on Carnaby Street. They grew rapidly and began to supply their clothes wholesale to larger retailers such as Jane Norman, DH Evans, and John Lewis. By 1974, they had a headquarters in Marylebone, a showroom in Great Portland Street and nine retail shops including branches in Chicago and Lausanne, Switzerland. They eventually moved to larger headquarters in Wood Green, but the retail side of the business was being overtaken in importance by the wholesale operations.

Aristos had his home in The Bishops Avenue, Hampstead, London, known as Billionaire's Row. Aristos' house in The Bishops Avenue stands in 2.5 acres has seven bedrooms, numerous reception rooms and bathrooms, the grounds included stables and separate apartment quarters for staff.

== Life ==
Constantinou was the son of a Greek Cypriot master tailor, the family emigrated to the UK in the early 1960s. His son Anthony was jailed in 2016 for sexually assaulting two women, and in June 2023 he was convicted of defrauding over £64 million from investors in a massive ponzi scheme. He absconded during his fraud trial, and was sentenced in absentia to 14 years in prison. As of August 2025 he was still on the run.

== Death ==
Aristos Constantinou was murdered in the early hours of New Year's Day 1985 at his home in The Bishops Avenue, Hampstead, London. He was shot several times after returning from a New Year's party with his wife Elena Hadjicostis. He was aged 40. The death was reported initially to be the result of a burglary. The account of the death given by Elena was subsequently challenged, with the police naming her the prime suspect in her husband's killing in a report submitted to the Crown Prosecution Service in 1997, and Constantinou's brothers calling for Elena to be charged with his murder.

Aristos was survived by his wife Elena and three children: Aristos, Nicholas and Anthony.
