= Koos van der Wildt =

Dutch footballer

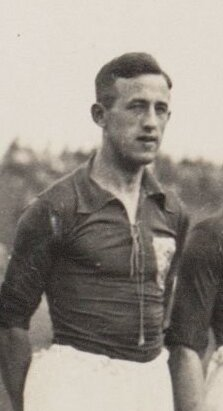
- Van der Wildt (1929)

Personal information
- Date of birth: 23 November 1905
- Date of death: 25 January 1985 (aged 79)

International career
Years	Team	Apps	(Gls)
1929–1930	Netherlands	7	(0)

Koos van der Wildt (23 November 1905 – 25 January 1985) was a Dutch footballer. He played in seven matches for the Netherlands national football team from 1929 to 1930.
