= Donald M. Jones =

American football coach (1920–1985)

Biographical details
- Born: 1920 or 1921; Albany, New York, U.S.
- Died: January 11, 1985 (aged 64); Florida, U.S.
- Education: Rutgers University (1943, 1948)

Playing career

Football
- 1939–1942: Rutgers

Basketball
- 1939–1943: Rutgers

Track and field
- 1940–1943: Rutgers
- Position: Halfback (football)

Coaching career (HC unless noted)

Football
- 1946: Rutgers (JV backfield)
- 1947: Rutgers (150-pound)
- 1948: Rutgers (freshmen)
- 1949–1972: Hamilton
- 1975–1978: Hamilton
- 1980–1984: Saint Andrew's School (FL)

Basketball
- 1949–?: Hamilton (JV)

Golf
- 1949–1980: Hamilton

Administrative career (AD unless noted)
- 1980–1985: Saint Andrew's School (FL)

Head coaching record
- Overall: 97–102–7 (college football)

Donald Maxstadt Jones (1920 or 1921 – January 11, 1985) was an American football, basketball, and golf coach. He was the head football coach for Hamilton College from 1949 to 1972 and from 1975 to 1978. He also coached Saint Andrew's School from 1980 until his death in 1985.

== Playing career and military career ==
Jones was born in the early 1920s and grew up in Albany, New York. He graduated from The Albany Academy in 1939. He enrolled at Rutgers University and participated in football, basketball, and track. In 1939, Jones played on the team's freshmen team before being a regular in the Rutger's backfield rotation for the next three seasons. He graduated in 1943.

Following Jones's graduation, he served as a bombardier in the United States Navy.

== Coaching career ==
After returning from the war, Jones was hired as the junior varsity backfield coach for his alma mater, Rutgers. After one season, he transitioned to the 150-pound varsity team before moving once more in 1948 to be the freshmen coach. In five games as freshmen coach, Jones's team outscored its opponents 118 to 19.

In 1949, at 28 years old, Jones was hired as the head football coach for Hamilton College. He succeeded Bud Svendsen. He also worked as the junior varsity basketball coach and the golf coach. He served as the head football coach until 1972. He returned as the head football coach in 1975 and held the position for four more seasons before retiring in 1978. In 28 total seasons as football coach, Jones led the team to an overall record of 97–102–7. The team's best season during his tenure was in 1958, as they finished 6–0–1.

Despite retiring less than a year prior, Jones returned to coaching as the head football coach for Saint Andrew's School in Boca Raton, Florida. He coached for five seasons before dying in 1985. He also served as the school's athletic director.

== Personal life ==
While coaching for Hamilton, Jones served as an associate professor of physical education.

Jones died on January 11, 1985, in Florida.

== Head coaching record ==
=== College football ===
Year	Team	Overall	Conference	Standing	Bowl/playoffs
Hamilton Continentals (Independent) (1949–1961)
1949	Hamilton	2–5			
1950	Hamilton	1–6			
1951	Hamilton	3–4			
1952	Hamilton	4–2–1			
1953	Hamilton	2–4			
1954	Hamilton	4–3			
1955	Hamilton	5–2			
1956	Hamilton	5–2			
1957	Hamilton	5–2			
1958	Hamilton	6–0–1			
1959	Hamilton	2–5			
1960	Hamilton	4–2–1			
1961	Hamilton	4–3			
Hamilton Continentals (NCAA College Division independent) (1962–1973)
1962	Hamilton	4–2–1			
1963	Hamilton	7–1			
1964	Hamilton	3–2–3			
1965	Hamilton	5–3			
1966	Hamilton	4–3			
1967	Hamilton	6–1			
1968	Hamilton	2–6			
1969	Hamilton	3–5			
1970	Hamilton	3–5			
1971	Hamilton	1–7			
1972	Hamilton	1–6			
Hamilton Continentals (NCAA Division III independent) (1975–1978)
1975	Hamilton	4–4			
1976	Hamilton	4–4			
1977	Hamilton	2–6			
1978	Hamilton	1–7			
Hamilton:		97–102–7			
Total:		97–102–7			
