= Helen Phillips Levin =

American activist and philanthropist (1924–1985)

- Born: Helen Adele Phillips; March 26, 1924; Minneapolis, Minnesota
- Died: January 6, 1985 (aged 60); Bel Air, California
- Occupation: Social worker
- Known for: Disability community leadership and philanthropy

Helen Phillips Levin (March 26, 1924 – January 6, 1985) was an American social worker, philanthropist and disability rights activist based in Los Angeles. A polio survivor, she had tetraplegia.

== Biography ==
Helen Adele Phillips was born in Minneapolis, Minnesota, the daughter of Rose Ebin and Jay Phillips, founder of the Phillips Distilling Company. Her parents were Russian Jewish immigrants and philanthropists who founded the Jay & Rose Phillips Family Foundation.

In 1941, Helen Phillips married Jack I. Levin. They had two sons, Thomas and John.

=== Polio ===
When her children were young, Levin contracted polio during the 1951 polio epidemic, becoming paralyzed. She spent almost a year in an iron lung during her recovery, and used a wheelchair. Her physical disabilities were considerable. As described by her son John, "She had virtually no use of her physical capacities but an outstanding mind — a lot of curiosity and a lot of energy".

== Volunteerism and activism ==
Levin looked for ways to be involved in the community. She completed a Master of Social Work (MSW) degree at the University of Southern California in 1981. She was described as one of the first disabled students at the USC School of Social Work, with the school making accommodations for her attendance before the passage of the Americans with Disabilities Act.

After receiving her degree, Levin worked at a suicide prevention hotline in Los Angeles, and read books for blind students. She was a major early benefactor of the Westside Center for Independent Living (WCIL), and served on its board. She also served on the architectural barriers committee of the Los Angeles City Council for the Handicapped.

=== Legacy ===
Levin died in 1985 at her home in Bel Air.

After her death, her family established several scholarships in her name at the University of Southern California, including the Helen Phillips Levin/Hebrew Union College Scholarship, and the Helen Phillips Levin Dean's Leadership Scholarship at the University of Southern California's School of Social Work.

In 1983, the WCIL, now known as the Disability Community Resource Center, named its building the Phillips Levin Building, for Helen Phillips Levin.

The Jay and Rose Philips Family Foundation has funded the Helen Phillips Levin Endowed Chair of Research at Craig Hospital in Colorado to support research into customized treatments for spinal cord and brain injuries.
