= Hubertus-Maria Ritter von Heigl =

German general (1897–1985)

- Born: 10 November 1897; Siegenburg, German Empire
- Died: 24 January 1985 (aged 87)
- Military career
- Allegiance: Nazi Germany
- Branch: Army (Wehrmacht)
- Rank: Generalmajor
- Commands: Pionier-Battalion 70 (mot.)
- Conflicts: World War II
- Awards: Knight's Cross of the Iron Cross

Hubertus-Maria Ritter von Heigl (10 November 1897 – 24 January 1985) was a general in the Wehrmacht of Nazi Germany during World War II. He took part the Invasion of Poland, the Battle of France and the War against the Soviet Union.

== Awards and decorations ==
- Knight's Cross of the Iron Cross on 13 January 1942 as Oberstleutnant and commander of Pionier-Bataillon 70 (motorisiert)
