= Arthur Tyler (cricketer) =

English cricketer and British Army officer

Personal information
- Full name: Arthur Wellesley Tyler
- Born: 18 June 1907; Charlton, Kent, England
- Died: 23 January 1985 (aged 77); Farnham, Surrey, England
- Batting: Right-handed
- Role: Wicket-keeper

Domestic team information
- Years: Team
- 1932: Norfolk

Career statistics
Competition	First-class
Matches	3
Runs scored	77
Batting average	19.25
100s/50s	–/–
Top score	26
Catches/stumpings	4/2
- Source: Cricinfo, 23 May 2019

Arthur Wellesley Tyler (18 June 1907 – 23 January 1985) was an English first-class cricketer and British Army officer. Attending the Royal Military Academy, Woolwich, Tyler was commissioned into the Royal Artillery in 1929. He served with the Royal Artillery until his retirement in 1954, in which time he saw action in the Second World War. He also played first-class cricket for the British Army.

== Life and military career ==
Tyler was born at Charlton and was educated at Cheltenham College. From Cheltenham, he attended the Royal Military Academy, graduating in January 1929 as a second lieutenant into the Royal Artillery. He was promoted to the rank of lieutenant in January 1930. He made his debut in first-class cricket for the British Army cricket team against the Marylebone Cricket Club at Lord's in 1931. He made two further first-class appearances for the Army in 1932, playing against the touring South Americans and the Royal Air Force. Playing as a wicket-keeper, Tyler scored 77 runs in his three matches, as well as taking four catches and two stumpings. He played once for Norfolk in minor counties cricket in 1932. He was promoted to the rank of captain in January 1938, having been made an adjutant the previous month.

Tyler served with the Royal Artillery in the Second World War, during which he was promoted to the rank of major in January 1944. He was mentioned in dispatches in March 1945, in recognition of gallant and distinguished service in the European theatre. After the war, he was promoted to the rank of lieutenant colonel in August 1949. He retired from active service in May 1954 and having exceeded the age for recall in June 1962, he was removed from the Reserve of Officers list. Tyler died at Farnham in January 1985.
