= Stanley Nibbs =

British Virgin island preacher and schoolteacher

Stanley Nibbs BEM
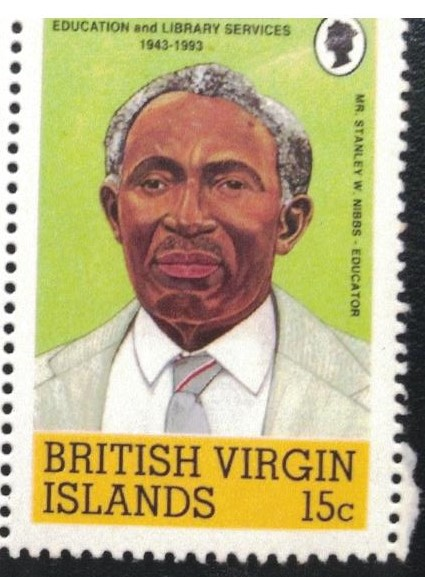
- Stanley W. Nibbs' honorary stamp issued in 1993
- Born: 7 June 1914; Tortola, British Virgin Islands
- Died: 16 January 1985 (aged 70)
- Spouse: Mabel Forbes-Nibbs
- Children: 9

Stanley Nibbs BEM (7 June 1914 – 16 January 1985) was an instructor and preacher on the island of Tortola in the British Virgin Islands (BVI). His educational service to the islands was recognized with his awarding of the British Empire Medal in 1968, and, in 1993, by the issue of a postage stamp, making him one of the first black citizens to appear on a BVI stamp.

== Biography ==
Stanley Nibbs was born in Tortola in the British Virgin Islands on 7 June 1914. He worked as teacher for the British Virgin Islands first high school, whilst also travelling the islands as a Methodist preacher. He died on 16 January 1985.

For over 50 years, Nibbs was the sole woodworking teacher for the British Virgin Islands Secondary School.

== Honours ==
In the 1968 New Year Honours, he was awarded the British Empire Medal (BEM) by Queen Eliabeth II in recognition of his civil service.

In 1993 a stamp was made to honour his secondary educational service. This was one of the first instances of BVI stamps honouring its black citizens.

On 21 October 2014, it was announced the Virgin Islands School of Technical Studies (VISTS) would be naming a wing of their school after Stanley Nibbs for his over 50 years of scholarly service to the Virgin Islands.
