= Eric Cross (cricketer) =

English cricketer

Personal information
- Full name: Eric Percival Cross
- Born: 25 June 1896; Handsworth, Warwickshire, England
- Died: 27 January 1985 (aged 88); Birmingham, Warwickshire, England
- Batting: Right-handed
- Role: Wicket-keeper

Domestic team information
- Years: Team
- 1928–1934: Staffordshire
- 1921–1923: Warwickshire

Career statistics
Competition	First-class
Matches	7
Runs scored	61
Batting average	7.62
100s/50s	–/–
Top score	12*
Balls bowled	–
Wickets	–
Bowling average	–
5 wickets in innings	–
10 wickets in match	–
Best bowling	–
Catches/stumpings	9/1
- Source: Cricinfo, 29 April 2012

Eric Percival Cross (25 June 1896 – 27 January 1985) was an English cricketer. Cross was a right-handed batsman who fielded as a wicket-keeper. He was born at Handsworth, Warwickshire, and was educated at Denstone College.

Cross made his first-class debut for Warwickshire against Gloucestershire in the 1921 County Championship at Edgbaston. Cross made six further first-class appearances for the county, the last of which came against the touring West Indians in 1923. In his seven first-class appearances, he scored a total of 61 runs at an average of 7.62, with a high score of 12 not out. Behind the stumps he took nine catches and made a single stumping. The presence of Tiger Smith in the Warwickshire squad limited his first team appearances. Cross later joined Staffordshire, making his debut for the county in the 1928 Minor Counties Championship against Lincolnshire. He played Minor counties cricket for Staffordshire to 1934, making a total of 41 appearances, the last of which came against the Yorkshire Second XI.

He died at Birmingham, Warwickshire, on 27 January 1985.
