= Cornelius Osgood =

American anthropologist

- Born: March 20, 1905; Winchester, Massachusetts
- Died: January 6, 1985 (aged 79); United States
- Education: University of Chicago
- Occupation: Anthropologist

Cornelius Berrien Osgood (March 20, 1905 – January 6, 1985) was an American anthropologist and ethnologist. He is known for his research among the Athapaskan-speaking people of interior Alaska.

== Life ==
Osgood was born in Winchester, Massachusetts, on March 20, 1905. He married Harriett Ellen Keeney on September 25, 1930. They had two daughters. On December 23, 1963, he married his second wife, Soo Sui-ling. Osgood died on January 6, 1985.

== Education and career ==
Osgood attended the University of Chicago, and received the degrees of Ph.B. in 1927 and Ph.D. in 1930, respectively.

Osgood served as the Curator of Anthropology at the Yale Peabody Museum from 1934 to 1973. He brought significant collections to the museum from his research expeditions in Japan, China and Korea.

== Bibliography ==
Osgood is the author of a number of notable books:

- The distribution of the northern Athapaskan Indians
- British Guiana archeology to 1945
- The ethnography of the Tanaina
- Ingalik social culture
