= Flora Vere O'Brien =

Irish writer

- Born: Florence Margaret Vere O'Brien; 19 September 1896; London, England
- Died: 1970 (aged 73–74)
- Occupations: Writer, artist
- Mother: Florence Vere O'Brien
- Relatives: Frances Egerton Arnold-Forster (aunt); H. O. Arnold-Forster (uncle); William Delafield Arnold (grandfather); Thomas Arnold (great-grandfather)

Flora Vere O'Brien (19 September 1896 – 1970) was an Irish writer and artist. Her work was part of the literature event in the art competition at the 1948 Summer Olympics.

== Early life ==
O'Brien was born in London and raised at Ballyalla, near Ennis, County Clare, one of the four children of Robert Vere O'Brien and Florence Vere O'Brien. Her mother, born Florence Arnold-Forster, was an artist and writer who ran schools to revive the Irish traditional crafts of Limerick lace and Clare embroidery. Historian Frances Egerton Arnold-Forster was O'Brien's aunt, and politician H. O. Arnold-Forster was her uncle; her grandfather was William Delafield Arnold, a British colonial administrator in the Punjab.

== Career ==
O'Brien displayed her paintings at a 1938 show of women's arts and crafts. During World War II, she hosted German-speaking refugees at her family's farm in County Clare. In 1948, O'Brien submitted a poem ("A Song of the Road") and a linocut print ("The Hurlers") for the arts exhibition of the 1948 Summer Olympics. Another linocut by O'Brien, "Chase", was included in the 1952 exhibition. She donated her mother's letters and other family papers to Trinity College Library in Dublin, in the 1950s and 1960s.

== Personal life and legacy ==
In her later years, O'Brien lived frugally on a small farm in Carrownacloghy (Ceathrú na Cloiche), in Clare. She died in 1970, in her seventies. She left lace samples and sketches and other family items to her niece, Veronica Rowe. In 2000, a book of O'Brien's poems and prints was published under the title Intimations. Her work was featured in a 2024 exhibit of "Irish Art Olympians" at the Waterford Gallery of Art.
