= Arnold Forster (disambiguation) =

Arnold Forster, or Arnold-Forster, may refer to:

- Arnold Förster (1810–1884), German entomologist
- Arnold Forster (ADL) (1912–2010), Anti-Defamation League attorney
- William Arnold-Forster (1886–1951), English politician, artist, author, and gardener
- Mark Arnold-Forster (1920–1981), English journalist and author
