= William Dennehy =

William Dennehy may refer to:

- William Francis Dennehy (1853–1918), Irish journalist
- Billy Dennehy (born 1987), Irish footballer
- Bill Dennehy, a pseudonym used by Murray Boltinoff
