= Frances Egerton Arnold-Forster =

British ecclesiastical historian (1857–1921)

Frances Arnold-Forster
- Born: 7 August 1857; Dharamshala, Punjab Province (British India)
- Died: 8 July 1921 (aged 63); Leeds

Frances Egerton Arnold-Forster, née Frances Arnold, (7 August 1857 – 8 July 1921) was a British ecclesiastical historian.

== Life ==
Frances Arnold was born in Dharamshala in 1857. Her parents were Frances Ann (née Hodgson) and William Delafield Arnold. Her grandfather was the Rugby headmaster Thomas Arnold. Her father worked as director of education in the Punjab. Her mother died in the year after she was born and she and her three siblings were sent to England. Their father died in 1859 en route in Gibraltar so they arrived in England as orphans, but they were adopted by her mother's sister Jane Martha (née Arnold) and her husband William Edward Forster.

Her adoptive parents initially saw to her education before she attended a private girls' school. When she was an adult she and her sister and two brothers all legally changed their last name to Arnold-Forster. Her brothers were Edward Penrose Arnold-Forster and Hugh Oakeley Arnold-Forster. Hugh became a politician and writer and her sister Florence Mary Arnold-Forster set up the Limerick Lace School.

Forster took an interest in the work of missionaries. She was a member and supporter of the Church Missionary Society and the Society for the Propagation of the Gospel. She took a particular interest in St James the Less Church in Pimlico and its mission; the church was built in 1850 in a poor part of London by three sisters.

She wrote particularly about missionary work overseas. In 1885 she wrote Heralds of the Cross which was about missionary work.

Possibly her most important work is Studies in Church Dedications: or, England's Patron Saints (1899) which was issued in three volumes. This was a novel subject for study - she looked at the reasons why churches were dedicated to particular saints.

Her personal journals covering 1871-73, 1873–76, 1876–79, 1879–83, 1883–85, and 1885-87 are extant.

== Private life ==
She did not marry. She was subject to stress and occasionally her work had to be postponed. She also cared for her sister's children and an elderly aunt.
