= William Arnold-Forster =

British artist, 1885–1951

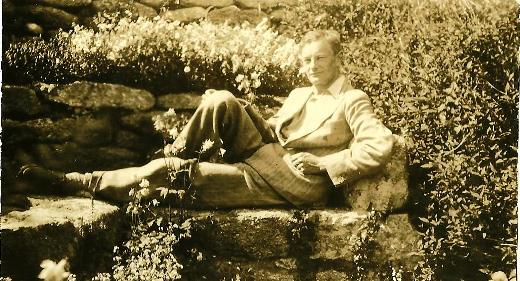
- W Arnold-Forster ca 1911
- Born: William Edward Arnold-Forster; 8 May 1886; South Kensington, London, England
- Died: 1951 (aged 65); Penzance, Cornwall, England
- Other names: William ("Will") Edward Arnold Forster; Lieutenant Commander (Retd) William Arnold Forster
- Education: Slade School (1905–1908)
- Occupations: Naval officer; politician; author; artist; gardener
- Spouses: Katherine Laird Cox (m. 1918; died 1938) Ruth Leigh Mallory (née Turner) (m. 1939; died 1942)
- Children: Mark Arnold-Forster
- Parents: H. O. Arnold-Forster (1855–1909); Mary Lucy Story-Maskelyne (1861–1951)
- Relatives: Nevil Story Maskelyne (grandfather); Thomas Arnold (grandfather)

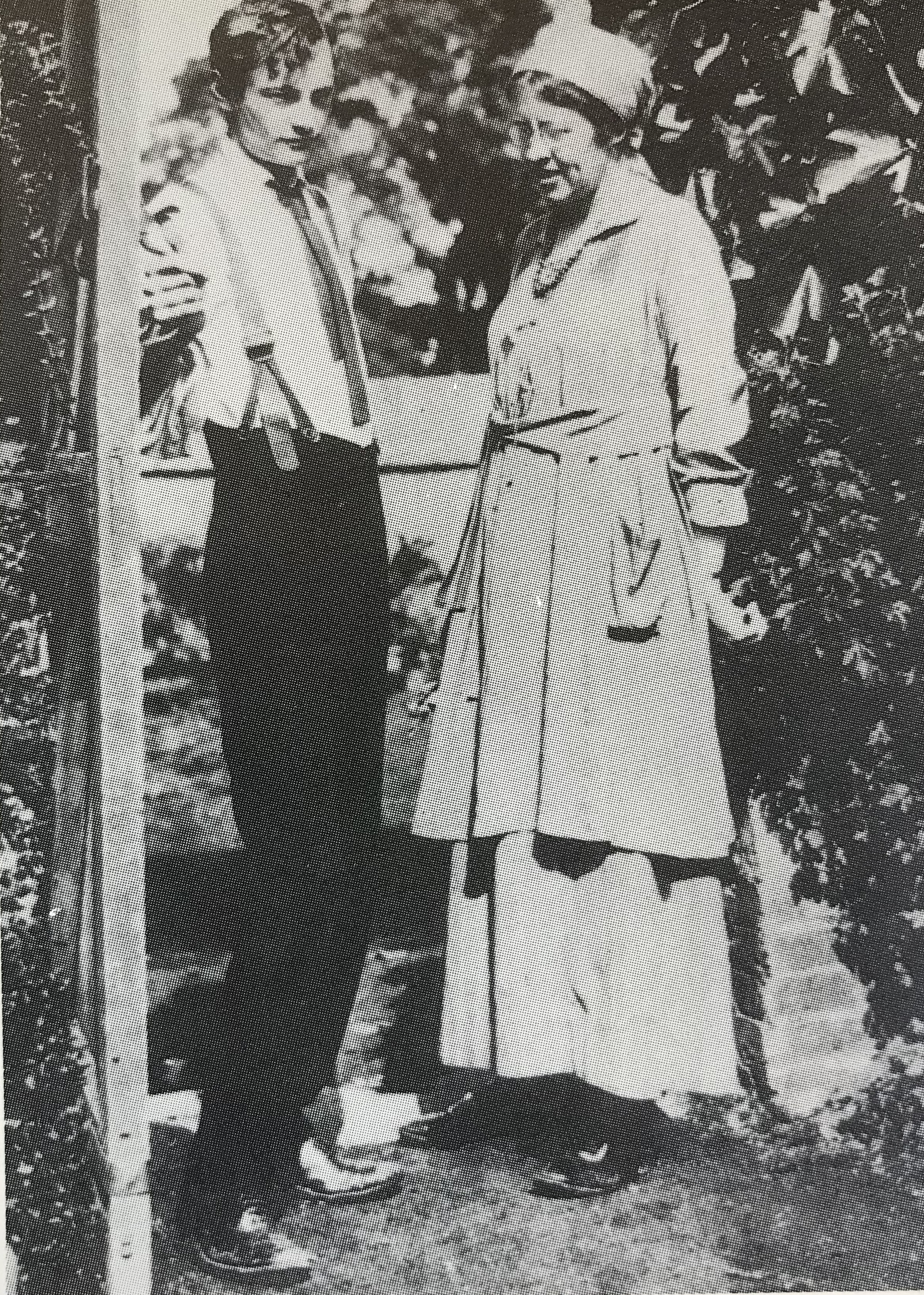
Will and Ka ca. 1917

William Edward Arnold-Forster (1886–1951) was an English author, artist, educator, gardener, Labour Party politician and retired naval officer. He was married to Katherine Laird Cox, a former member of the Bloomsbury group, and associated with Rupert Brooke and the Neo-pagans at Cambridge University. The Arnold-Forsters were instrumental in founding Gordonstoun School in 1934, and Will was the first chairman of the board of governors.

== Life ==
William ("Will") Arnold-Forster was born into a distinguished military and political family in 1886, the youngest son of Hugh Oakeley Arnold-Forster, a Liberal Unionist MP and his wife, Mary Story-Maskeline, daughter of Nevil Story Maskelyne. He had three older brothers, Mervyn (Merv), John and Christopher (Kit). He inherited an interest in art from his mother, studying at the Slade School (1905–1908). There, he won several prizes. He moved to Italy in 1911, living near Fiesole in Tuscany until 1914 when he returned to England at the beginning of World War I, joining the Royal Navy and working in the Admiralty, having previously been a naval cadet.

After the war, he married Katharine ("Ka") Laird Cox, who was then working at the Admiralty and moved with her to Zennor on the Cornish coast, near St Ives, where they purchased 'The Eagle’s Nest'. (Note: The house and area has a long history of association with the literary and artistic community. Its occupants have included Patrick Heron) Arnold-Forster was an enthusiastic gardener, and the garden that he created at 'The Eagle’s Nest' was described as spectacular. He also worked on the Memorial Garden at St Ives, and with the sculptor Barbara Hepworth on her garden there. During World War II, Will served in the Home Guard. He died in 1951 at the age of 65.

== Family ==
Will Arnold-Forster and Ka Cox had one son, Mark Arnold-Forster (1920–1981), an author and journalist. Will and Ka were interested in progressive education, and when Mark was seven, they sent him to boarding school in Switzerland, and two years later to Schule Schloss Salem, a boarding school in Salem, Baden-Württemberg run by Kurt Hahn. With the rise of the Nazi Party in Germany, Hahn, a Jew, was imprisoned, but was released with the assistance of the Arnold-Forsters and fled to Scotland in 1933. The Arnold-Forsters with Hahn were then instrumental in the founding of Gordonstoun, of which Arnold-Foster was the first chairman of the board of directors, where Mark continued his education as one of the first pupils, till 1937.

Ka died suddenly in 1938 at the age of 51, while her husband was in North America on a peace mission. The following year he married his friend Ruth Leigh Mallory (née Turner) (1892–1942), the widow of the mountaineer George Leigh Mallory (1886–1924) at Wandsworth, but she died three years later of cancer.

== Work ==
On 21 December 1914, Arnold-Forster enlisted in the Royal Naval Volunteer Reserve, joining the Trade Division at the Admiralty where he was involved in planning the naval blockade of Germany. On 29 December 1914, he was promoted to the rank of lieutenant, and to lieutenant commander on 4 June 1916. In 1919 he served on the Paris Peace Conference, and wrote the Royal Navy's history of the blockade. He was demobilised on 19 December 1919.

As a Labour politician, Arnold-Forster was a strong human rights advocate, and became involved in the creation of the League of Nations (1920). He joined the Union of Democratic Control (UDC), a pressure group arguing for more parliamentary control over foreign policy, and against war. In the interwar period he was influential in the foreign policy debates that tried to find an alternative to war, as a member of the All Souls Foreign Affairs Group (Note: Named for All Souls College, Oxford) and as a key member of the Labour Party's Advisory Committee on International Relations (Advisory Committee on International Questions). There, Arnold-Forster, Philip Noel-Baker and Hugh Dalton were considered a "triumvirate". As an Internationalist, he was one of the more vocal supporters of the League within the party, and argued for multilateral disarmament. He lectured at the University of Virginia Institute of Public Affairs in 1938. During World War II he continued to advance ideas for a new international body with more coercive powers. After the war he continued writing and speaking on internationalism and the United Nations.

As an artist, he first joined the St Ives Arts Club in 1909 and was noted for landscapes and pastels. His work is included in the National Portrait Gallery, London.

=== List of selected publications ===
Books

- Arnold-Forster, William (1922). France, Ourselves and the Future. London: Union of Democratic Control.
- — (1931). The Disarmament Conference. National Peace Council.
- — (1939). The Blockade, 1914-1919, Before the Armistice-and After. Clarendon Press.
- — (1944). Charters of the Peace: A Commentary on the Atlantic Charter and the Declarations of Moscow, Cairo and Teheran. Victor Gollancz.
- — (1944). To-day and To-morrow: Britain and the Peace. Directorate of Army Education.
- — (1946). The United Nations Charter Examined. Labour Party.
- — (2000) [1948 Country Life]. Shrubs for the Milder Counties (Revised ed.). Alison Hodge Publishers. ISBN 978-0-906720-28-8.

Articles

- Arnold-Forster, W. (December 1931). "Our Case in the Disarmament Campaign". Labour Magazine. X: 350.
- — (April 1934). "The Crisis in Disarmament". Labour. I: 205.
- — (April–June 1942). "The Atlantic Charter". Political Quarterly. 12 (2): 149.
- — (5 April 1947). "Trusteeship or Annexation". New Statesman and Nation.
- — (1938). "Colonies as a Trust". University of Virginia Institute of Public Affairs. Charlottesville, VA.

== Bibliography ==
Books and theses

- Arnold-Forster, William (1931). The Disarmament Conference. National Peace Council.
- Arnold-Forster, William (1939). The Blockade, 1914-1919, Before the Armistice-and After. Clarendon Press.
- Arnold-Forster, William (1946). The United Nations Charter Examined. Labour Party.
- Ashworth, Lucian M. (2007). International Relations and the Labour Party: Intellectuals and Policy Making from 1918-1945. I.B.Tauris. ISBN 978-0-85771-361-2.
- Aster, Sidney (2004). Appeasement and All Souls: A Portrait with Documents, 1937-1939. Cambridge University Press. ISBN 978-0-521-84374-4.
- Douglas, R. M. (2004). The Labour Party, Nationalism and Internationalism, 1939-1951. Routledge. ISBN 978-1-135-77008-2.
- Pugh, Martin (2010). Speak for Britain!: A New History of the Labour Party. Random House. ISBN 978-1-4070-5155-0. see also Speak for Britain!
- Ritschel, Daniel (1997). The Politics of Planning: The Debate on Economic Planning in Britain in the 1930s. Clarendon Press. ISBN 978-0-19-820647-7.
- Thornton, Henry S. (1947). The attitude of the British Labour Party on foreign policy, 1931-1 (MSc thesis). University of Massachusetts, Amherst.
- Veevers, Nick; Allison, Pete (2011). Kurt Hahn. Springer Science & Business Media. ISBN 978-94-6091-469-0.
- Winkler, Henry Ralph (1994). Paths not taken: British labour and international policy in the 1920s. University of North Carolina Press. ISBN 9780807821718.

Websites

- Winter, Jane (2018). "Ka Cox and Will Arnold-Forster". Archived from the original on 10 November 2016.
- Castle, Jack (6 November 2015). "Growing up with the St Ives School". Impressionist & Modern Art. Christie's. Archived from the original on 21 May 2016.
- "William Edward Arnold Forster". Cornwall Artists Index.
- NPG. "William Edward Arnold-Forster (1885-1951)". npg.org.uk. National Portrait Gallery, London.
- Parsons, Sheridan (12 October 2015). "William Edward Arnold-Forster". Wootton Bassett in the Great War.
- Shannon, R. T. (21 May 2009). "Forster, Hugh Oakeley Arnold". Oxford Dictionary of National Biography (online ed.). Oxford University Press. doi:10.1093/ref:odnb/30459. (Subscription, Wikipedia Library access or UK public library membership required.)
- "The home of British & Irish family history". Find my past. 2018.
- "Arnold-Forster William Edward 1886-1951 | Artist Biographies". Artist Biographies: British and Irish Artists of the 20th Century.
- Genes Reunited. "Search".
- Simkin, John (August 2014). "Ruth Mallory". Spartacus Educational.
- "W E Arnold Forster Listed English Artist". Adverts Marketplace Ltd., Latin Hall, Golden Lane, Dublin.
- "Miles Burkitt, archaeologist, at the Casa Fontanalba in 1929". Clarence Bicknell. Clarence Bicknell Association. 2018. Archived from the original on 25 April 2018.
- "A Guide to the Papers of the Institute of Public Affairs, University of Virginia, 1927-1953 Papers RG-2/4/1.891, RG-2/4/1.892". Virginia Heritage. University of Virginia. 2011.
