= Oakfield; or, Fellowship in the East =

1853 novel by William Arnold

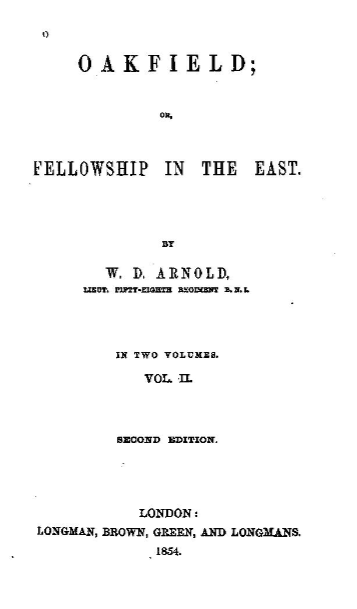
- Title page for Oakfield; or, Fellowship in the East (1854)
- Author: William Arnold
- Language: English
- Genre: Novel
- Publisher: Longman, Brown, Green, and Longmans
- Publication date: 1853
- Publication place: United Kingdom
- Media type: Print (Hardcover)

Oakfield; or, Fellowship in the East is a novel by William Delafield Arnold, first published in 1853. The book is one of the earliest novelistic accounts of life in British India, and its plot strongly mirrors the biography of its author. Set in India about the time of the First Afghan War, the novel describes the unhappy experiences of the eponymous Edward Oakfield, a graduate of Oxford who enlisted with the East India Company's military service because he tired of the metaphysical debates dominating that university. In India, Oakfield is disgusted by what he sees as an absence of Christian gentlemanliness among the Company's military officers, and he soon retreats to the comradeship of a few like-minded people.

== Major themes ==
The novel is an indictment of the moral standards of the British regiments in India. Indeed Arnold, fearing a backlash, originally published the novel using the pseudonym Punjabee. The second edition, of 1854, reveals the author's identity and adds a preface which functions as an apologia.
