= William Martin Murphy =

Irish politician and businessman (1845–1919)

- Murphy, c. 1911

Member of Parliament for Dublin St Patrick's
- In office 1885–1892
- Preceded by: New Office
- Succeeded by: William Field

Personal details
- Born: 6 January 1845 Castletownbere, County Cork, Ireland
- Died: 26 June 1919 (aged 74) Dublin, Ireland
- Party: Irish Parliamentary Party
- Parents: Dennis William Murphy; Mary Anne Martin
- Education: Belvedere College
- Occupation: Businessman; Newspaper publisher; Politician
- Known for: Dublin Lockout of 1913

William Martin Murphy (6 January 1845 – 26 June 1919) was an Irish businessman, newspaper publisher and politician. A member of parliament (MP) representing Dublin from 1885 to 1892, he was dubbed "William Murder Murphy" among the Irish press and the striking members of the Irish Transport and General Workers' Union during the Dublin Lockout of 1913. He was arguably both Ireland's first "press baron" and the leading promoter of tram development.

== Early life ==
Murphy was born on 6 January 1845 in Castletownbere, County Cork, and educated at Belvedere College. It is frequently incorrectly stated (including in the cited article) that he was an 'only child' when in fact he had two brothers who died young, and a sister Margaret Cullinane, who lived to be 93, and was buried with Murphy in Glasnevin. When his father, the building contractor Denis William Murphy (1799–1863), died, he took over the family business. His enterprise and business acumen expanded the business, and he built churches, schools and bridges throughout Ireland, as well as railways and tramways in Britain, West Africa and South America.

== Politician ==
He was elected as Irish Parliamentary Party MP for Dublin St Patrick's at the 1885 general election, taking his seat in the House of Commons of the United Kingdom of Great Britain and Ireland. He was a member of the informal grouping, the "Bantry band" – a group of politicians who hailed from the Bantry Bay area. The Bantry Band was also disparagingly dubbed the "Pope's brass band". Its most famous member was Timothy Healy MP and included Timothy Harrington MP, sometime Lord Mayor of Dublin City – however, Harrington (unlike Murphy and, later, Healy) was a Parnellite in the 1890s. (Tim Harrington MP was not the same individual as TR Harrington, who edited the Irish Independent from 1905 to 1931, though they both came from the Bantry/Schull area in West Cork.)

When the Irish Parliamentary Party split in 1890 over Charles Stewart Parnell's leadership, Murphy sided with the majority Anti-Parnellites. However, Dublin emerged as a Parnellite stronghold and in the bitter general election of 1892, Murphy lost his seat by over three to one to a Parnellite newcomer, William Field.

Murphy was the principal financial backer of the "Healyite" newspapers the National Press and the Daily Nation. His support for Healy attracted the hostility of the majority anti-Parnellite faction led by John Dillon. He made two attempts to return to Parliament, at Kerry South in 1895 and Mayo North in 1900, but both were unsuccessful because of Dillonite opposition.

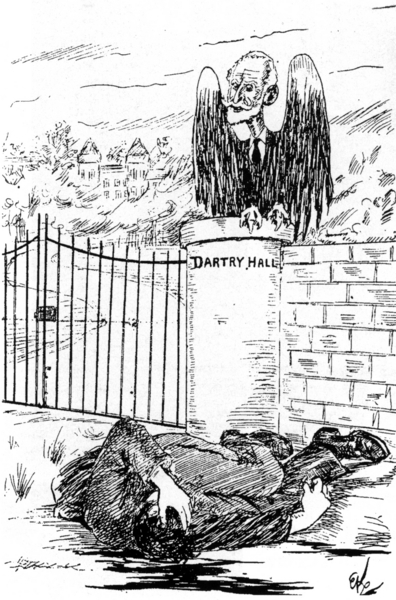
The Vulture of Dartry Hall, a contemporary satirical depiction

== Publisher ==
In 1900, he bought the insolvent Irish Daily Independent from the Parnellites, merging it with the Daily Nation. In 1905 he re-launched this as a cheap mass-circulation newspaper, the Irish Independent, which rapidly displaced the Freeman's Journal as Ireland's most popular nationalist paper. In 1906, he founded the Sunday Independent newspaper.

He refused a knighthood from King Edward VII in 1907 after organising a controversial International Exhibition in Herbert Park, Dublin (it was opposed by many nationalists who considered it as cosmopolitan and as encouraging the purchase of imported goods). In fact, the King-Emperor, Edward VII, was about to knight Murphy, but the honour was refused. Murphy had previously made it clear to the viceroy, Lord Aberdeen, that under no circumstances would he accept a knighthood, but Aberdeen had failed to pass on the message. Murphy appears to have been motivated by pride; he did not wish to have it said that he had angled for a title and compromised his nationalist principles.

Murphy was highly critical of the Irish Parliamentary Party; from 1914 he used the Irish Independent to oppose the partition of Ireland and to advocate Dominion Home Rule involving full fiscal autonomy (which the 1914 Home Rule Act would not have granted).

== Union-buster ==
Murphy took a benevolent attitude to traditional trade union activity amongst skilled workers but resisted the advance of new unionism. Worried that the Irish Transport and General Workers' Union would destroy the Dublin tramways, Murphy led Dublin employers opposition to the union led by James Larkin, an opposition that culminated in the Dublin Lockout of 1913. This made him extremely unpopular with many, being depicted as a vulture or a vampire in the pro-union press.

After the 1916 Easter Rising, he bought ruined buildings in Abbey Street as sites for his newspaper offices. His Irish Independent called for the executions of Seán Mac Diarmada and James Connolly at a point when the Irish public began to feel sympathy for their cause. This incident made him even more unpopular. Murphy privately disavowed the editorial, claiming it had been written and published without his knowledge. In May 1916 he led the establishment of the Dublin Fire and Property Losses Association to exert pressure on the British government to compensate businesses which had lost property in the Rising. The pressure exerted by Murphy resulted in the Property Losses (Ireland) Committee being established by the Lord Lieutenant of Ireland the following month.

== Later career ==
He was invited in 1917 to take part in talks during the Irish Convention which was called to agree terms for the implementation of the suspended 1914 Home Rule Act. However he discovered that John Redmond was negotiating agreeable terms with Unionists under the Midleton Plan to avoid the partition of Ireland but at the partial loss of full Irish fiscal autonomy. This infuriated Murphy who criticised the intention in his newspaper, which severely damaged the Irish Parliamentary Party. However, the Convention remained inconclusive, and the ensuing demise of the Irish party resulted in the rise of Sinn Féin, whose separatist policies Murphy also did not agree with.

Murphy died on 26 June 1919 and was buried in Glasnevin Cemetery, Dublin.

His family controlled Independent Newspapers until the early 1970s, when the group was sold to Tony O'Reilly.

Parliament of the United Kingdom
New constituency	Member of Parliament for Dublin St Patrick's; 1885 – 1892	Succeeded by William Field
