= Irish International Exhibition =

Exposition held in Dublin (Ireland, then United Kingdom) in 1907

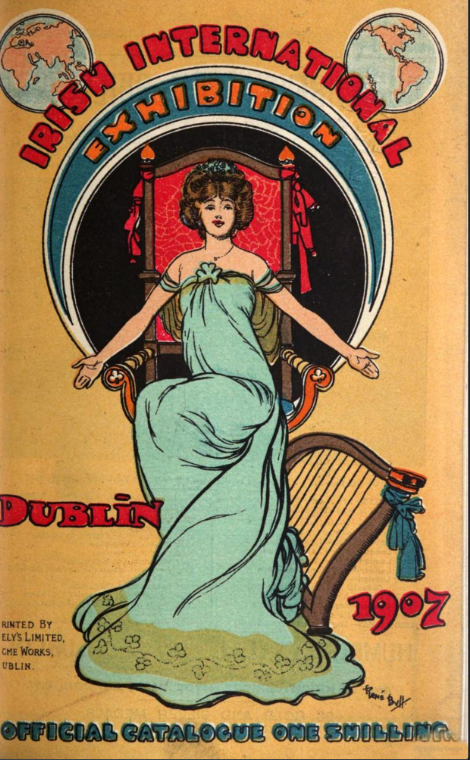
- Exhibition catalogue

Overview
- BIE-class: Unrecognized exposition
- Name: Irish International Exhibition
- Area: 52 acres
- Visitors: 2.75 million

Location
- Country: United Kingdom of Great Britain and Ireland
- City: Dublin
- Venue: Herbert Park
- Coordinates: 53°19′37″N 6°14′06″W

Timeline
- Opening: 4 May 1907
- Closure: 9 November 1907

The Irish International Exhibition (sometimes Dublin International) was a world's fair held in Dublin in 1907, when all of Ireland was still part of the United Kingdom.

== Summary ==
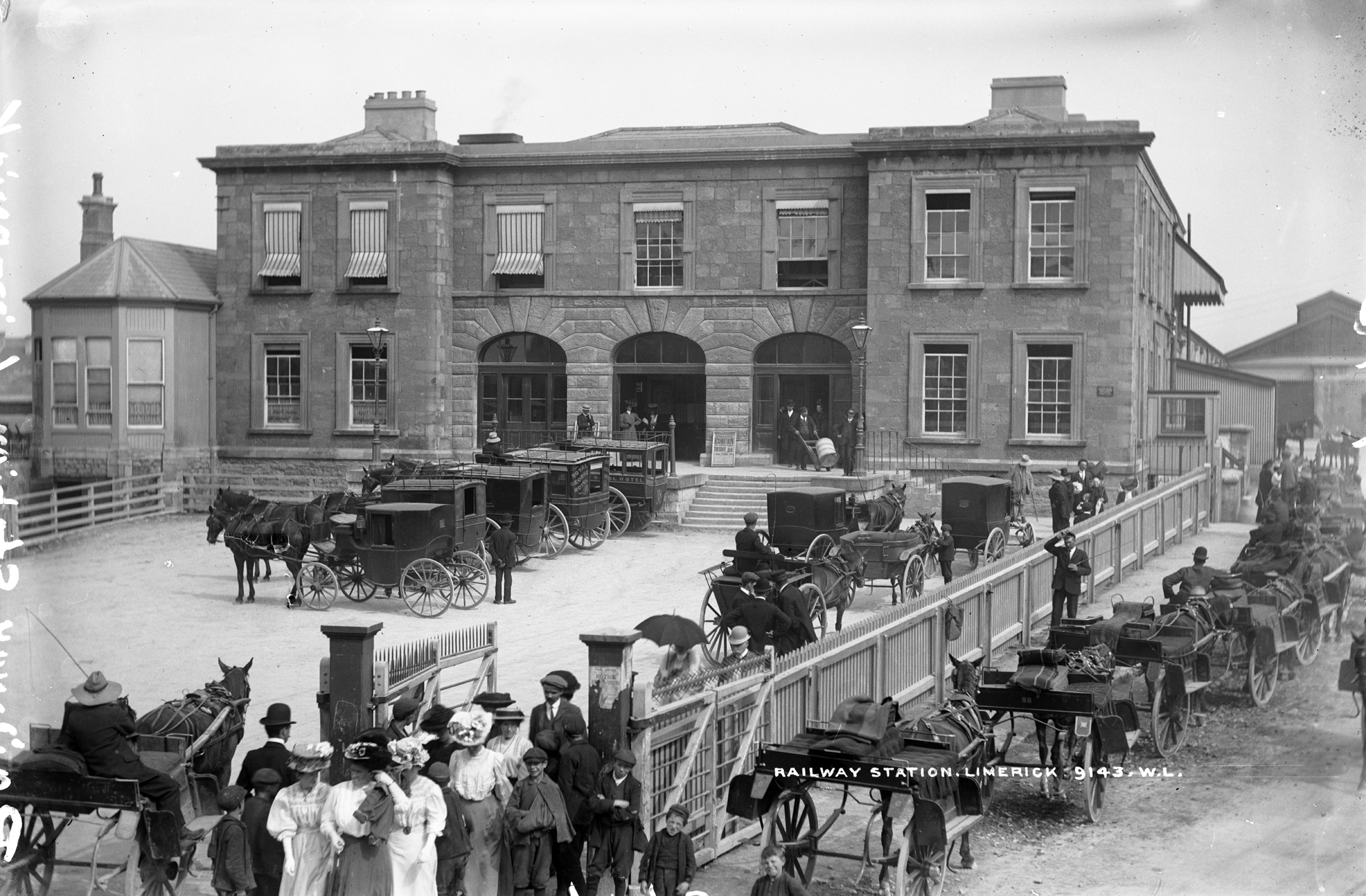
People waiting to board a train at Limerick Station to the Exhibition

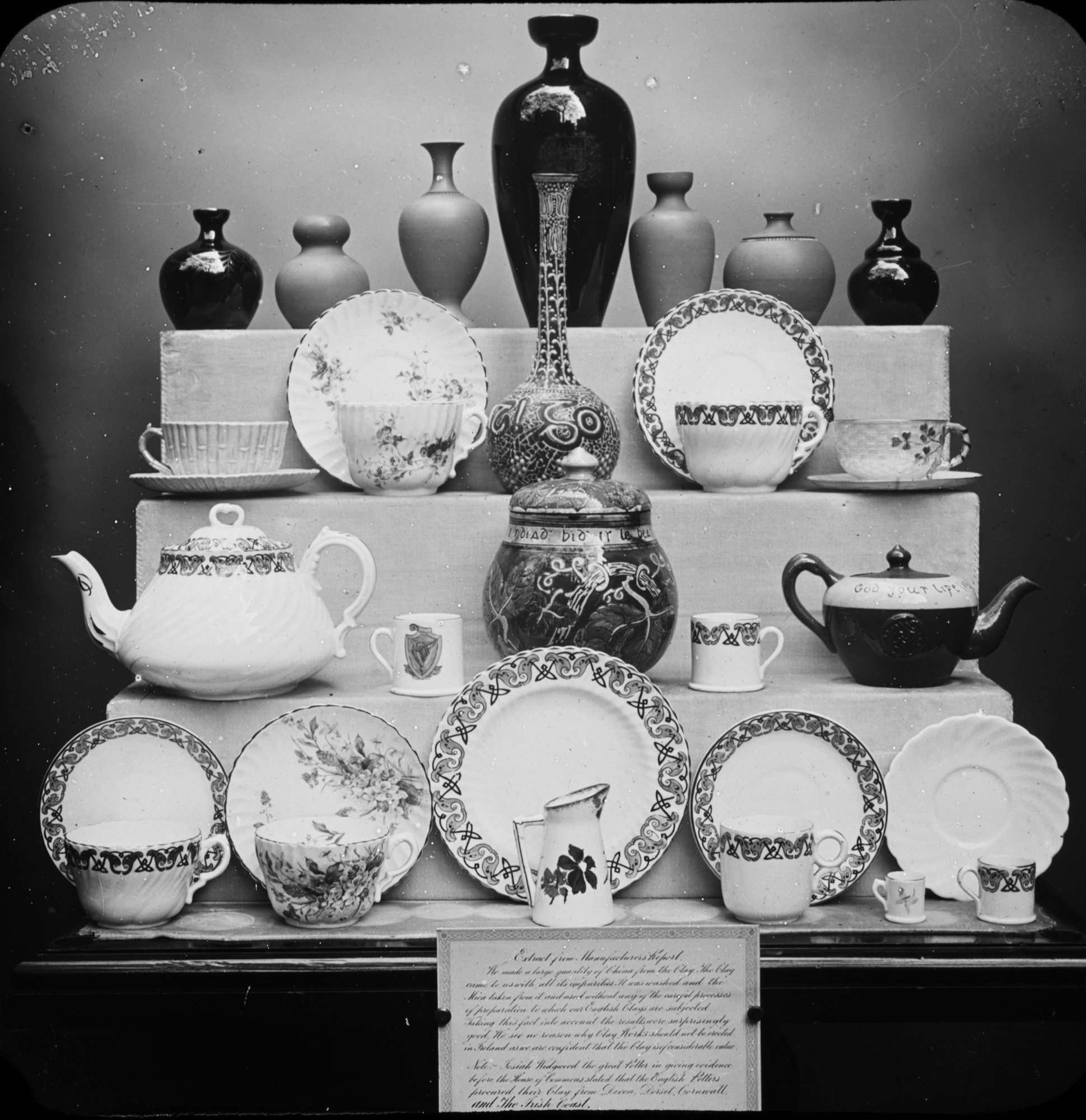
Pottery exhibit at the Exhibition

The decision to hold the exhibition was taken at the Irish Industrial Conference in April 1903, and inspired by a small exhibition in Cork (the Cork International Exhibition) 5 years earlier. The 1907 exhibition was intended to improve the trade of Irish goods. The leading force behind the project was William Martin Murphy, a businessman and owner of the Irish Independent, Clerys department store (Clery & Co.), the Dublin United Transport Company and several other Irish and overseas ventures. Other organisers included the Irish journalist William Francis Dennehy.

The exposition ran from 4 May to 9 November 1907, received 2.75 million visitors covered 52 acres and made a loss of about £100 000 sterling, although this was underwritten by guarantors.

As well as contributions from countries including Canada, France and New Zealand there were displays of motor cars, electric and gas lighting and machinery; fine art displays including work by Eva Henrietta Hamilton; Clare embroidery; funfair amusements; a display depicting life in British Somaliland, the 'Somali village', was the exhibition's most popular attraction.

== Legacy ==
The land used for the exhibition became Herbert Park, where remaining artifacts include a bandstand and pond.

== Notables ==
There was a separation of Irish and British pavilions at a time when desire for Home Rule for Ireland was becoming more vocal, and some years before a declaration of independence and the eventual secession of the Irish Free State from the United Kingdom.

== Gallery ==
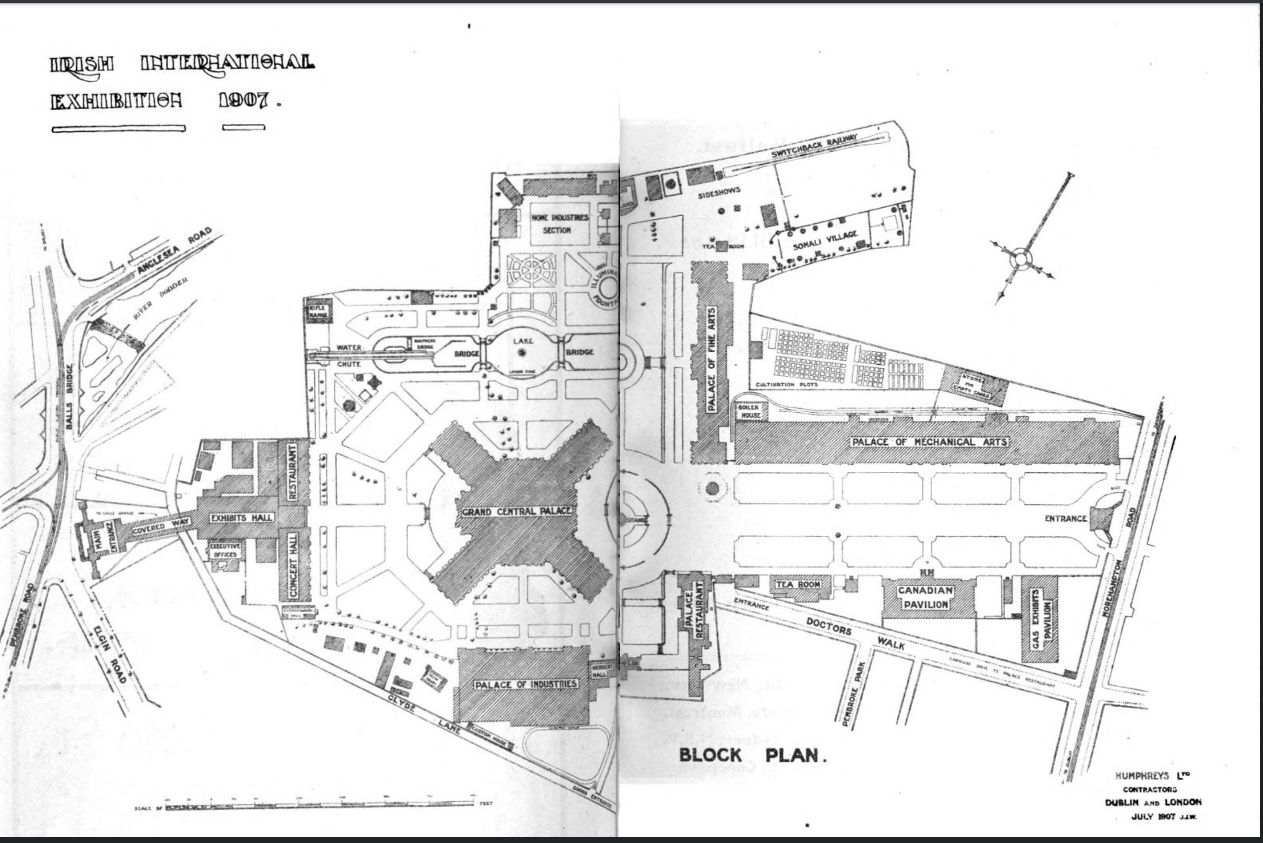
Map of exhibition site

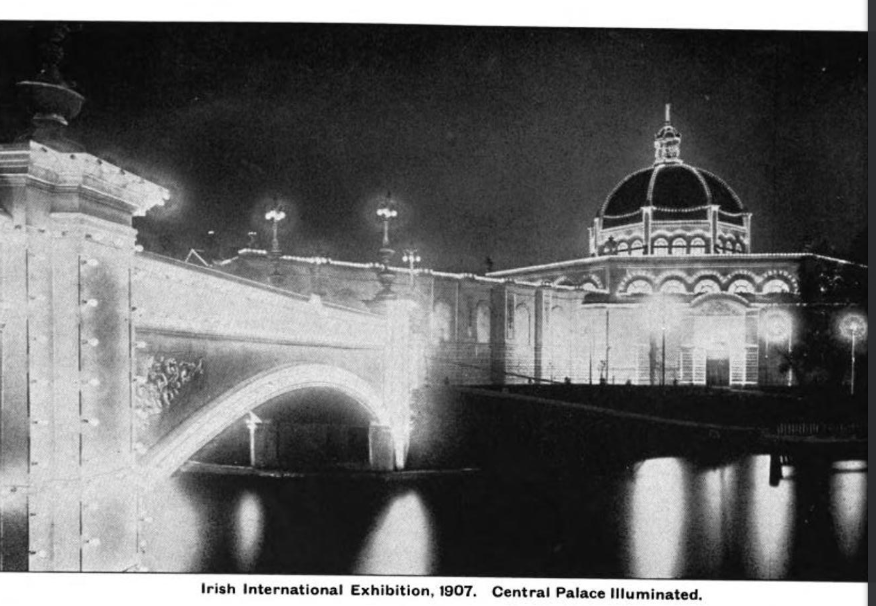
Hall illuminated at night

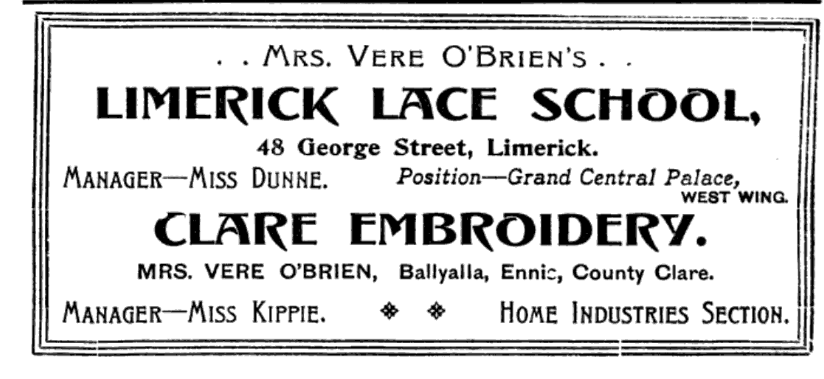
Advertisement for Clare embroidery

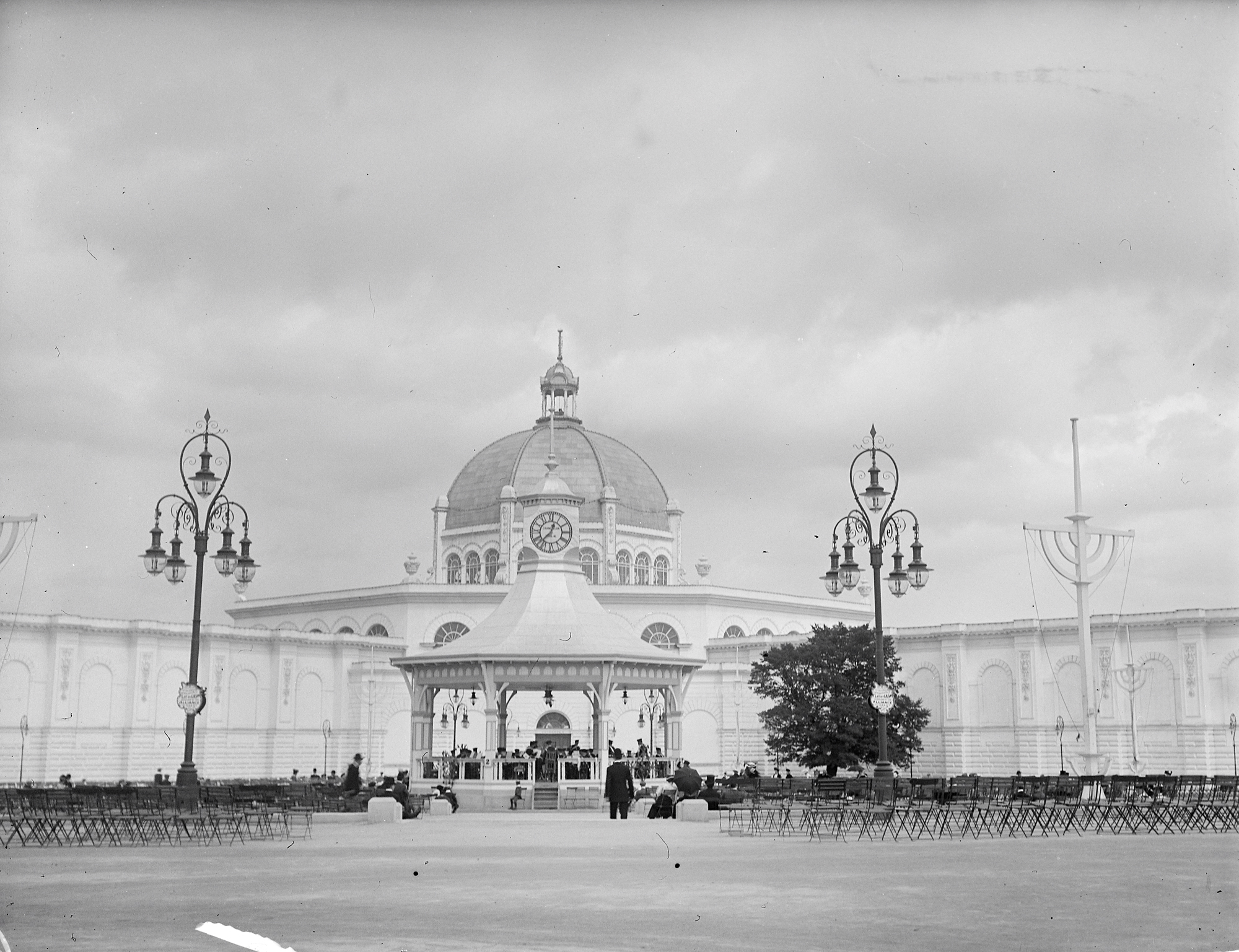
Herbert Park Pavilion with bandstand

== See also ==
- Great Industrial Exhibition (1853)
- Colonial exhibitions
- International Exhibition of Arts and Manufactures
- Dublin Civic Exhibition (1914)
