= Clare embroidery =

Style of Irish textile art

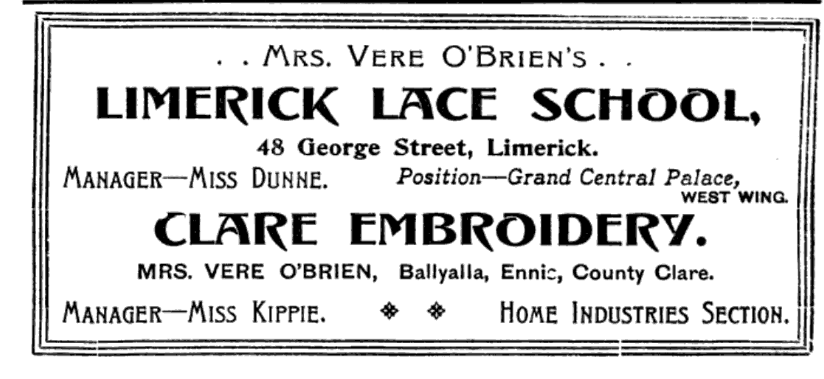
- Advertisement in the International Irish Exhibition catalogue, 1907
- Type: Style of embroidery
- Place of origin: County Clare, Ireland
- Manufacturer: Clare Embroidery School
- Introduced: 1892

Clare embroidery was a style of Irish textile art established at the Clare Embroidery School, which was founded by Florence Vere O'Brien. Using floral and geometric designs, often in blue and white threads, pieces decorated in this style were exhibited in Ireland, England and America. Queen Victoria purchased smocks decorated with Clare embroidery. An archive of the style is held at Clare Museum.

== History ==
Founded in 1892 in Newhall, Ennis by Florence Vere O'Brien, its purpose was to provide training in embroidery for girls and young women, enabling them to have independent incomes in their futures. In 1897, the annual report by the Commissioners of National Education described how Clare embroidery was also taught in Ennis Convent in the Industrial Department, and that there was "a steady demand for Clare embroidery".

Initially, the school taught around fifteen girls at a time. In 1898, the school moved to Ballyalla, where up to twenty-seven students could be taught together. It was managed by the Vere O'Brien's housekeeper, Mina Keppie. During the First World War, Keppie volunteered to collect sphagnum moss, which was used as a medical treatment. It took up to two years for a student to become proficient, but once she had gained the skills she could earn up to fourteen shillings per week (in 1908 for example).

Satellite classes were established, including one in 1889 at Mount Callan, Inagh, by a Mrs. Tottenham. Another class began in 1907 in Scarrif, and also, reportedly, a class at a convent in Myanmar (then Burma). Clare embroidery was still being produced up to the death of Vere O'Brien, with a last recorded order from Canada in 1938.

== Style ==
Clare embroidery is characterised by floral and geometric motifs, using coloured or white threads. These designs were initially created by either Vere O'Brien or her sister, though by 1923 Florence's daughters Jenny and Flora had taken over. Popular colours for designs were red and blue. It could be combined with smocking and was often used on lawn cloth or fine holland. Scalloping of hems was also typical of the style. Items decorated with it included smocks, cushion covers, aprons and pinafores. According to Linda Ballard, the stitches used were not complex. The washability of the materials was noted by design historian Nicola Gordon Bowe.

== Reputation and legacy ==
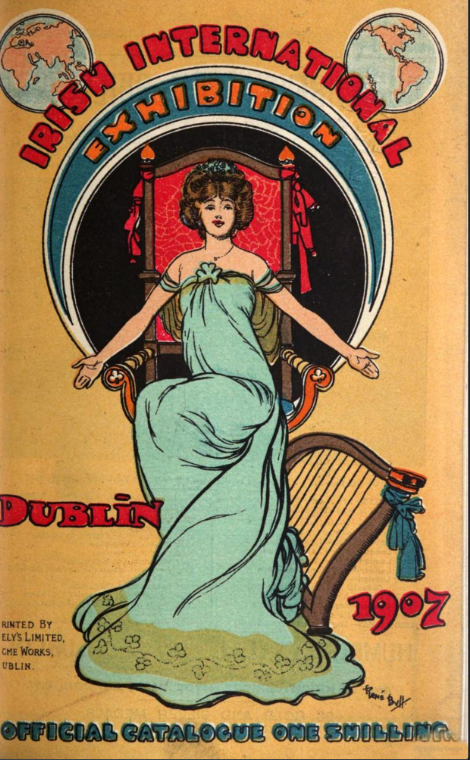
Irish International Exhibition catalogue

Irish embroidery was extremely popular from the 1890s to the 1920s, supported by exhibitions in Ireland, Britain and in America. Queen Victoria purchased pieces in 1900 and her collection included twelve smocked dresses for her grandchildren. Other work was exhibited at world's fairs, including in 1893 in Chicago and in St Louis in 1904. Examples of embroidery and smocking were displayed in the Large Hall and the Home Industries pavilions at the Irish International Exhibition in Dublin in 1907. It was also displayed at the Ideal Home Exhibition in London in 1908.

In 1988, an exhibition of the work curated by Veronica Rowe was held at the De Valera Public Library. Clare Museum held an exhibition celebrating the work of the school in 2006. The Clare style was also used as inspiration for the decoration of a quilt, created to mark 100 years of women's suffrage in Clare. In 2020 Clare Museum received funding related to cultural engagement and COVID-19, to support the digitisation of its collection of Clare embroidery.
