= William Field (Irish politician) =

Irish politician (1843–1935)

Member of Parliament for Dublin St Patrick's
- In office 1892–1918
- Preceded by: William Martin Murphy
- Succeeded by: Constance Markievicz

Personal details
- Born: June 1843 Blackrock, Dublin
- Died: 29 April 1935 (aged 91)
- Party: Irish National League

William Field (June 1843 – 29 April 1935) was an Irish butcher from Dublin, and a nationalist politician. From 1892 to 1918 he was Member of Parliament (MP) for Dublin St Patrick's, taking his seat in the House of Commons of the United Kingdom of Great Britain and Ireland.

His father was a supporter of Young Ireland. Born at Blackrock, County Dublin, he was educated at Harcourt Street School, Dublin, and at the Catholic University, Dublin. He ran one of the biggest butchers' businesses in Dublin and was president of the National Meat Traders' Federation. He was also a member of Blackrock Urban District Council and Dublin Port and Docks Board. J. J. Horgan described him in 1905 as "a venerable figure with a wide-brimmed hat and picturesque appearance reminiscent of Buffalo Bill". D.P. Moran's weekly paper The Leader often published caricatures of him in the 1912–18 period.

Field was politically active from the 1870s and had extensive connections in the labour movement and in 'Irish Ireland' organizations such as the Gaelic Athletic Association and Gaelic League. In the 1892 general election, standing for the Parnellite Irish National League, he took the St Patrick's seat in the Parnellite stronghold of Dublin from the sitting anti-Parnellite Irish National Federation MP William Martin Murphy by the wide margin of 3,991 votes to 1,110. Thereafter he retained this seat unopposed through five successive general elections, joining the United Irish League (sitting in the Irish Parliamentary Party) when the two factions reunited in 1900. At the 1918 general election he was defeated by Constance Markievicz of Sinn Féin by more than two to one.

He presented himself as a labour representative, though he denounced socialism; he attended early Irish trade union congresses as representative of the "Knights of the Plough" a farm laborers' body founded by Benjamin Pelin at Narraghmore, County Kildare in June 1892. Field then formed a break-away branch of the Irish Land and Labour Association, called the Land and Labour League designating himself as its president. He was essentially a "Labor nationalist" believing Irish workers and employers shared a common interest in developing Irish industry. The 1911 Census shows him living, unmarried, at 6 Main Street, Blackrock. The Nestor and Cyclops episodes of James Joyce's novel Ulysses contain passing references to a cattle traders' meeting addressed by Field, who expresses criticism of the quarantine imposed on Irish districts where cattle are suffering from foot and mouth disease.

== Selected writings ==
- Distress in the West and South of Ireland, Dublin, M. H. Gill, 1898
- Irish Railways compared with State-owned and Managed Lines, Dublin, Irish Independent Printing and Publishing Co., 1898
- Irish Industry and Treasury Tactics, Dublin, J. Duffy & Co., 1909
- Town Tenants’ Texts, Dublin, John Falconer, 1915
- Housing Homily: Dublin Domiciles, Dublin, Cahill & Co., 1916

== Sources ==
- Horgan, John J. (1949). Parnell to Pearse: Some Recollections and Reflections. Dublin: Browne & Nolan.
- Maume, Patrick. The Long Gestation: Irish Nationalist Life 1891–1918. Dublin: Gill & Macmillan.
- Walker, Brian M., ed. (1978). Parliamentary Election Results in Ireland, 1801–1922. Dublin: Royal Irish Academy. ISBN 0901714127.
- Who Was Who, 1929–1940

Parliament of the United Kingdom
Preceded by William Martin Murphy	Member of Parliament for Dublin St Patrick's; 1892–1918	Succeeded by Constance Markievicz
