= William Francis Dennehy =

William Francis Dennehy (1853–1918), was an Irish journalist, writer and editor. He edited the Irish Catholic newspaper since its founding in 1888 until 1917 shortly before he died in 1918. Dennehy, a close associate William Martin Murphy, helped organise the Irish International Exhibition in 1907 in Dublin. and compiled a record of it. During the split in the Irish Parliamentary Party, Dennehy took the Anti-Parnell view.

He became owner of The Irish Catholic, which upon his death in 1918 became a limited company.

== Publications ==
- The Story of the Union - as told by its plotters, by Dennehy, W.F., published by J.J. Lawlor, Dublin 1891.
- Irish International Exhibition 1907, Compiled and Edited by William F. Dennehy, Dublin, 1909
