= William Delafield Arnold =

British colonial administrator (1828–1859)

- Born: 7 April 1828
- Died: 9 April 1859 (aged 31)
- Education: Rugby School; Christ Church, Oxford
- Spouse: Frances Anne Hodgson (m. 1850; died 1858)
- Children: 4
- Parents: Thomas Arnold (father); Mary Penrose (mother)
- Relatives: Matthew Arnold (brother); Thomas Arnold (brother); Florence Arnold (daughter); Hugh Arnold (son); Frances Arnold (daughter)

William Delafield Arnold (7 April 1828 – 9 April 1859) was a British writer and colonial administrator.

== Early life ==
He was the fourth son of Thomas Arnold, the headmaster of Rugby School. His older brothers included the poet and critic Matthew Arnold and the literary scholar Tom Arnold. He was educated at Rugby School and Christ Church, Oxford, matriculating in 1846. Not long after his father's death in 1842, William, a pupil at Rugby, was part of a committee of three, Arnold, W. W. Shirley and Frederick Hutchins, that drew up the first written rules for football at Rugby School. These rules were approved in August 1845 and published that same year, becoming the first known published set of rules for any code of football.

Later, William served as an educational administrator (during 1855) in Punjab, in British India; as the first director of public instruction in the Punjab, he was responsible for implementing "Halkabandi" in that province. One of his most significant achievements was to enact a law separating church and state in public schools. As a result, Hindu pupils who attended these schools were no longer required to study the Bible or the Koran in public schools. This policy would later influence public schools in England as well. While working in India, William wrote several articles for Fraser's Magazine, mainly concerning "the India question" (see bibliography). In 1853, William published a novel of Anglo-Indian life, Oakfield; or, Fellowship in the East, which explores commonalities between spiritual traditions of the East and the West, while also predicting the "mutiny" that would occur soon afterward. The main character of Oakfield is dying of disease contracted in India; its author was afflicted with the same disease. William died aged 31, at Gibraltar, on his way home from India. Matthew Arnold's poem "A Southern Night" mourns his early death.

== Family ==
On 3 April 1850, Arnold married Frances Anne Hodgson, known as Fanny, the daughter of Major-General John Anthony Hodgson of the Bengal army.

Their children were:

- Edward Penrose Arnold-Forster DL (1851–1927), military officer and worsted wool manufacturer in Yorkshire
- Florence Mary Arnold-Forster (1854–1936), craftswoman and author, founder of the Limerick Lace School, married Robert Vere O'Brien
- Hugh Oakeley Arnold-Forster MP (1855–1909), Cabinet minister and political author
- Frances Egerton Arnold-Forster (1857–1921), ecclesiastical historian

After the deaths of Frances in March 1858 and William in April 1859, the children were adopted by William's sister Jane Martha and her husband William Edward Forster, later adopting the surname Arnold-Forster.
