= Speak for Britain! =

2010 book by Martin Pugh

Speak for Britain! A New History of the Labour Party
- Cover of the first edition
- Author: Martin Pugh
- Language: English
- Published: 2010 (Bodley Head); 2011 (Vintage)
- Publication place: United Kingdom
- Media type: Print
- Pages: 464
- ISBN: 978-0-09-952078-8
- Dewey Decimal: 324.24107

Speak for Britain! A New History of the Labour Party is a 2010 book by the British historian Martin Pugh.

== Synopsis ==
Speak for Britain! is a comprehensive history of the Labour Party from foundation to New Labour. The author argues Labour never entirely succeeded in "converting the whole working class to Socialism", instead adopting radical liberalism in some areas and populism in others to win over different voters. The book criticises the failure of the party to embrace constitutional reform in the United Kingdom, "compounding common ground with Conservatism". Hugh Gaitskell is also criticised for alleged failure to understand the Labour movement and the abandonment of the commitment to full-scale public ownership of industry is also examined.

== Reception ==
In The Guardian, former Labour politician Roy Hattersley wrote that "a 'new history of the Labour party' needs to be far more than a catalogue of names and events. Pugh certainly has opinions which, irrespective of their merits, make welcome additions to the narrative...But most of Speak for Britain (one exception is constitutional reform) lacks analysis. As a result, it informs without teaching the lessons that Labour needs to learn." In the New Statesman the book was described as "timely". A review in World Socialism, published by the Socialist Party of Great Britain, described the book as "a good factual picture of the Labour Party’s history" and noted that the author "clearly has it in for Blair, regarding him as an essentially Conservative figure" and that in the index listing of "Thatcher, Margaret", the index lists a few page references and then states, "see also Blair, Tony". The book was also reviewed by Conservative Party MP Keith Simpson in the Total Politics magazine.
