= Mark Arnold-Forster =

English journalist & author (1920–1981)

- Arnold-Forster c.1940
- Born: 16 April 1920; Swindon, Wiltshire, England
- Died: 25 December 1981 (aged 61); London, England
- Resting place: West London Crematorium
- Education: Gordonstoun
- Occupation: Journalist · Author
- Employer: The Guardian newspaper
- Known for: The World at War (book and TV series)
- Spouse: Valentine Mitchison
- Children: 5
- Parent(s): William Edward Arnold-Forster; Katherine Cox
- Relatives: Matthew Arnold; Naomi Mitchison; Hugh Oakeley Arnold-Forster; R. B. Haldane

Mark Arnold-Forster, DSO, DSC (16 April 1920 – 25 December 1981) was an English journalist and author. He is best remembered for his book The World at War, which accompanied the 1973 television series of the same name.

== Early years ==
He was the only son of William Edward Arnold-Forster (b. 1886, d. 1951), painter, publicist, and gardener, and his wife Katharine "Ka" Laird, née Cox (b. 1887, d. 1938) and grandson of Hugh Oakeley Arnold-Forster. His parents' families included leading politicians and writers, among them Matthew Arnold, and his mother had been close to Rupert Brooke and his group as well as to Virginia Woolf. Shortly after his birth, his parents went to live in a picturesque Cornish house, Eagle's Nest, in Zennor, Cornwall. They placed Mark at the age of seven in a boarding school in the French-speaking part of Switzerland, and at nine in Kurt Hahn's Schule Schloss Salem at Salem in Germany. When Hitler came to power in 1933, Hahn was driven into exile, and Arnold-Forster followed him to a new school, Gordonstoun in Scotland, where he stayed until he left school in 1937. This upbringing made him fluent in French and German. Arnold-Forster won a place to study mechanical engineering at Trinity Hall, Cambridge, but he never took this up. Instead, after a year's apprenticeship during 1938–39 with the Blue Funnel Line, involving a voyage to Manchuria, Arnold-Forster went on to join the Royal Navy.

== Wartime career ==
Mark Arnold-Forster served throughout the Second World War, first as a merchant seaman and then in the Royal Navy Volunteer Reserve. He served on a destroyer on the Murmansk convoy and then (1942–1944) on motor torpedo boats in the English Channel. Eventually he was promoted to the rank of lieutenant in command of a flotilla at Dover, despite looking quite young for his age. His tasks included engaging the Scharnhorst, Gneisenau, and Prinz Eugen in battle and torpedoing a tanker. He limped home from a battle with a broken-down engine after being nearly rammed by a German destroyer. He also laid mines under fire off the French coast and worked for naval intelligence. He was appointed a DSO, awarded the DSC, was three times mentioned in despatches, and was demobilized as a reserve Lieutenant in 1946.

== Journalism career ==
In 1946, Arnold-Forster joined the editorial staff of The Manchester Guardian. He worked first in Manchester and then in Germany, where he wrote about the immediate post-war period and the Berlin Blockade in 1948. In 1949 he became labour correspondent, a key job he carried out for eight years. He then joined The Observer as a political correspondent, but in 1963 he had a falling out with The Observer over an issue related to an editorial change to one of his articles. He resigned in disgust and returned to The Guardian as chief editorial writer. He later moved to ITN, as deputy to editor Sir Geoffrey Cox, making the switch to television without any difficulty. In the 1970s, he wrote the series The World at War, with narration by Laurence Olivier and Jeremy Isaacs as the producer. He continued to write regular leaders for The Guardian until his death in 1981.

== Personal life ==
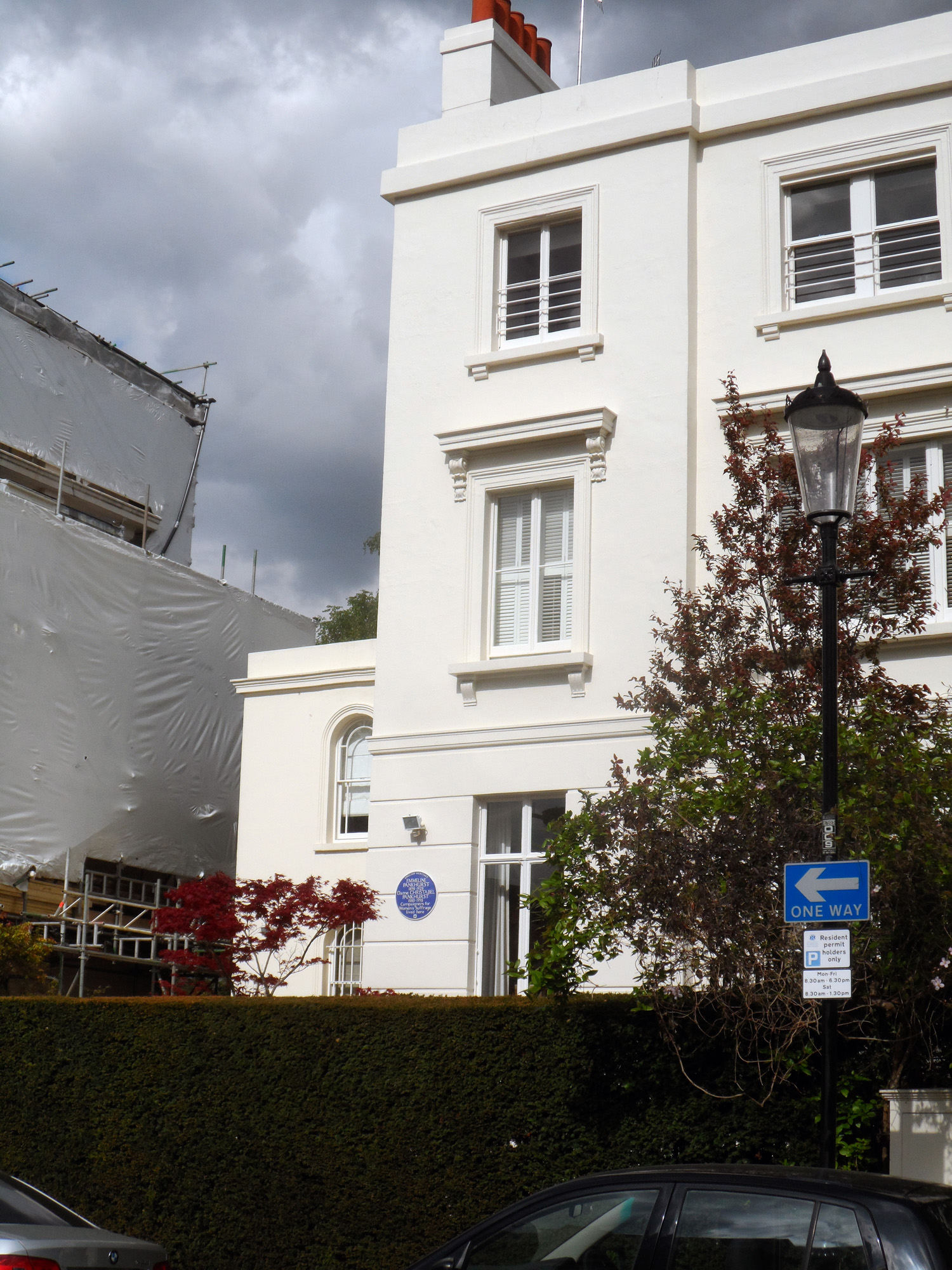
M. Arnold-Forster's later life home in Notting Hill was formerly the home of Emmeline Pankhurst and her daughter, fellow women's suffragist Christabel Pankhurst

On 12 January 1955, he married Valentine Harriet Isobel Dione Mitchison (1930–2023), also a journalist, daughter of the Labour politician Dick Mitchison and the novelist Naomi Mitchison. Both were related to successive secretaries of state for war, Hugh Oakeley Arnold-Forster and R. B. Haldane. They had three sons and two daughters.

== Decline and death ==
Mark Arnold-Forster suffered from persistent ill health in his fifties, in particular a series of minor strokes. In 1979, he developed cancer of the upper colon and died at his home, 50 Clarendon Road, Notting Hill, London, on Christmas Day, 1981. He was cremated at West London crematorium on 5 January 1982.

== Books by Arnold-Forster ==
- Mark Arnold-Forster, The World at War, Publ: Pimlico, Revised Edition, 2001, (ISBN 0712667822).
- Mark Arnold-Forster, The Siege of Berlin, Publ: Collins, 1979, (ISBN 0002167395).
- Mark Arnold-Forster, The Future of the Labour Party: A Stock-Taking, Publ: Manchester Guardian and Evening News, 1955, ASIN: B0007JWQE2.

== Selected publications ==
- Mark Arnold-Forster, "The East German parliament," Parliamentary Affairs, V(2), pp. 274–280. pdf

== Bibliography ==
Rosselli, John (2004). "Forster, Mark Arnold-". Oxford Dictionary of National Biography (online ed.). Oxford University Press. doi:10.1093/ref:odnb/38509. (Subscription, Wikipedia Library access or UK public library membership required.)

- G. Taylor, Changing faces: a history of The Guardian 1956–1988 (1993)
- The Guardian (28 December 1981)
- The Times (13 January 1955)
- The Times (28 December 1981)
- D. Ayerst, Guardian: biography of a newspaper (1971)
- A. Hetherington, 'Guardian' years (1981)
- P. Scott, The battle of the narrow seas, 1939–1945 (1945)
- H. L. Brereton, Gordonstoun (1968)
- H. Röhrs and H. Tunstall-Behrens, eds., Kurt Hahn (1970)
- Bernard Sendall, Origin and foundation, 1946–62 (1982), vol. 1 of Independent television in Britain (1982–90)
- P. Delany, The neo-pagans (1987)
- N. G. Annan, 'The intellectual aristocracy', Studies in social history: a tribute to G. M. Trevelyan, ed. J. H. Plumb (1955), pp. 241–87
