= H. O. Arnold-Forster =

British politician and writer (1855–1909)

The Right Honourable H. O. Arnold-Forster
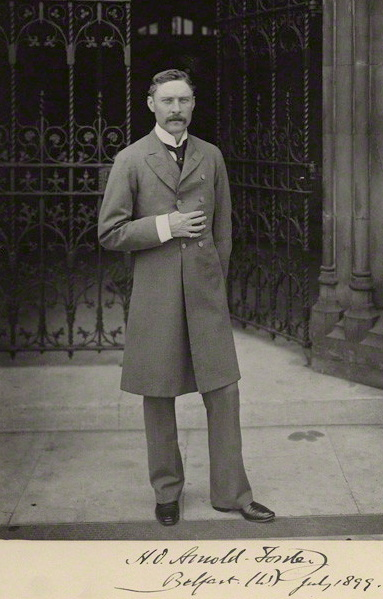

Secretary of State for War
- In office 12 October 1903 – 4 December 1905
- Monarch: Edward VII
- Prime Minister: Arthur Balfour
- Preceded by: Hon. St John Brodrick
- Succeeded by: Richard Haldane

Personal details
- Born: Hugh Oakeley Arnold; 19 August 1855
- Died: 12 March 1909 (aged 53)
- Party: Liberal Unionist
- Spouse: Mary Story-Maskelyne (1861–1951) (m. 1885)
- Parents: William Delafield Arnold (father); Frances Anne Hodgson (mother)
- Relatives: William Edward Arnold-Forster (son); Katherine Laird Cox (daughter-in-law); Mark Arnold-Forster (grandson); William Edward Forster (uncle); Nevil Story Maskelyne (father-in-law); Thereza Dillwyn Llewelyn (mother-in-law)
- Education: University College, Oxford

Hugh Oakeley Arnold-Forster PC (né Arnold; 19 August 1855 – 12 March 1909), known as H. O. Arnold-Forster, was a British politician and writer. He was Secretary of State for War in Arthur Balfour's Conservative government from 1903 until December 1905.

== Background and education ==
Arnold-Forster was the son of William Delafield Arnold, Director of Public Instruction in the Punjab, and Frances Anne Hodgson, known as Fanny, the daughter of Major-General John Anthony Hodgson of the Bengal army. She died in 1858. His grandfather was Thomas Arnold, headmaster of Rugby. When his father died in 1859, he and his siblings were adopted by William Edward Forster and his wife Jane, who was William Arnold's sister. He was educated at Rugby and University College, Oxford, from which he graduated with first class honours. He was called to the bar in 1879.

== Political career ==
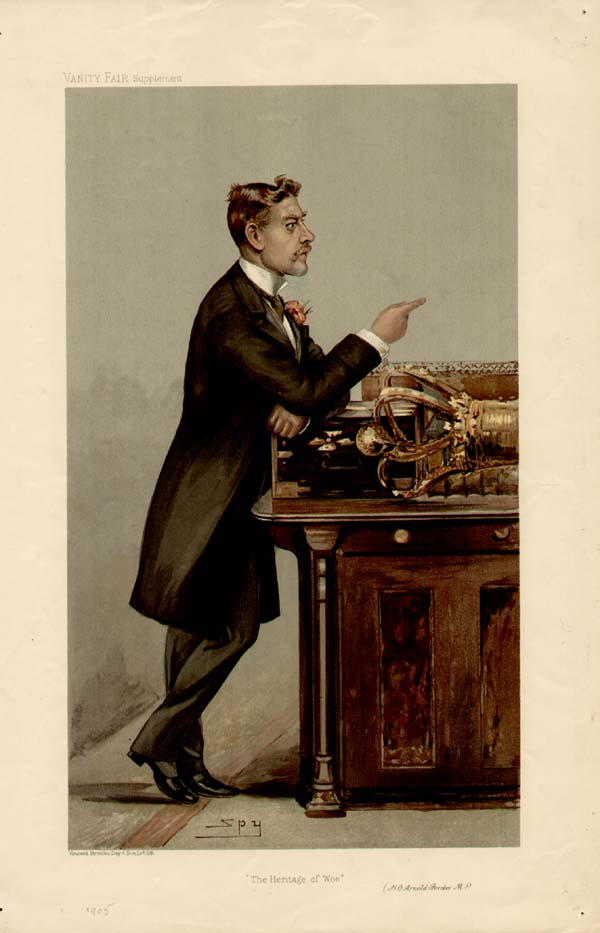
Arnold-Foster caricatured by Spy for Vanity Fair, 1905

Arnold-Forster acted as private secretary to his adoptive father, who became Chief Secretary for Ireland in 1880. He joined Cassell & Co. in 1885, for whom he prepared educational manuals, including the "Citizen Reader" series. He was secretary of the Imperial Federation League from 1884.

Arnold-Forster sat as Liberal Unionist Member of Parliament for West Belfast from 1892 to 1906 and Unionist member for Croydon from 1906 until his death. He served as Parliamentary and Financial Secretary to the Admiralty under Lord Salisbury and Arthur Balfour from 1900 to 1903. As such, he was during August 1902 invited by German authorities to tour the dockyards and naval establishments in Kiel and Wilhelmshaven and several of the great private shipyards in the country. Balfour appointed him to Secretary of State for War (with a seat in the cabinet) in 1903, and he served as such until 1905, during which time he reorganized the War Office (see Esher Report). In 1903 he was sworn of the Privy Council. During the Army reforms he clashed with Lord Esher, the King's minister attendant. He complained to the Prime Minister that he was being circumvented by an unelected and unaccountable authority vested in the royal prerogative. Balfour's abolition of the post of Commander-in-Chief in 1904 was partly to reduce royal influence over the army. Arnold-Foster was frequently ignored at cabinet meetings, as decisions had been taken behind his back by courtiers moving in military circles.

== Family ==
Arnold-Forster married Mary Lucy Story-Maskelyne (1861–1951), daughter of Nevil Story Maskelyne and Thereza Dillwyn Llewelyn (Welsh astronomer and pioneer in scientific photography) in 1885. They had four sons, of whom his Times obituary states "the eldest is just beginning to practise as an artist, and the youngest is a naval cadet." They were:

- William Edward Arnold-Forster (8 May 1886 – 1951) artist, author and Labour politician, married Katherine "Ka" Laird Cox in 1918. She was the former lover of Rupert Brooke. Their son was Mark Arnold-Forster. After Cox's death, he married Ruth Mallory, widow of George Mallory, the mountaineer.
- Mervyn Nevill Arnold-Forster (21 March 1888 – 6 May 1927)
- John Anthony Arnold-Forster (20 September 1889 – 1958), married Daphne Mansel-Pleydell in 1919. Vanda Morton, biographer of Nevil Story Maskelyne, is their daughter.
- Hugh Christopher Arnold-Forster (9 December 1890 – 21 July 1965), who rose to become a Commander in the Royal Navy and served as Deputy Director of Naval Intelligence during the Second World War; married Marcia Buddicom in 1922 and Frances Brown in 1948.

Arnold-Forster died in March 1909, aged fifty-three.

== Publications ==
Arnold-Forster's publications include:

- How to Solve the Irish Land Question
- The Citizen Reader
- The Laws of Everyday Life
- This World of Ours
- In a Conning Tower
- Things New and Old
- Our Home Army
- A History of England
- Army Letters
- The Coming of the Kilogram
- Our Great City
- The Army in 1906: a Policy and a Vindication
- English Socialism of To-Day
- An English View of Irish Secession in Political Science Quarterly (Mar. 1889)
- The Queen's Empire: A Pictorial and Descriptive Record, 2 Volumes, 1899
- Military needs and military policy

Parliament of the United Kingdom
Preceded by Thomas Sexton	Member of Parliament for Belfast West; 1892–1906	Succeeded by Joseph Devlin
Preceded by Charles Ritchie	Member of Parliament for Croydon; 1906–1909	Succeeded by Sir Robert Hermon-Hodge, Bt
Political offices
Preceded by William Ellison-Macartney	Parliamentary and Financial Secretary to the Admiralty; 1900–1903	Succeeded by E. G. Pretyman
Preceded by Hon. St John Brodrick	Secretary of State for War; 1903–1905	Succeeded by Richard Haldane
