= Katherine Laird Cox =

Member of the Bloomsbury set

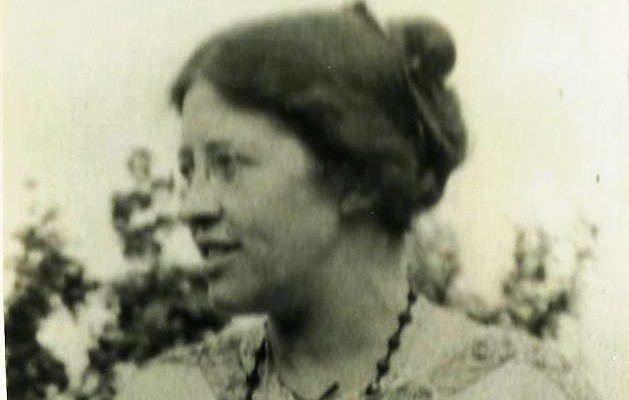
- Ka Cox
- Born: 7 January 1887; Kensington, London, England
- Died: 23 May 1938 (aged 51); Zennor, Cornwall, England
- Other name: List: Ka Cox; Miss K. laird Cox; Mrs. Katherine Arnold-Forster
- Education: Newnham College, Cambridge
- Known for: Fabian Society, Artist's model, member of Bloomsbury Group
- Spouse: William Arnold-Forster (m. 1918–1938)
- Children: Mark Arnold-Forster
- Relatives: John Charles Cox (uncle)

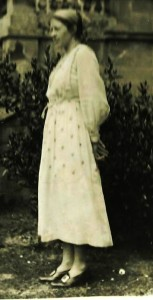
Ka Cox, undated

Katherine Laird "Ka" Cox (7 January 1887 – 23 May 1938) was a Fabian and graduate of Cambridge University. There, she met Rupert Brooke, becoming his lover, and was a member of his Neo-Pagans. She was also a friend of Virginia Woolf and the Bloomsbury Group. During World War I she worked with the Serbian Relief Fund, assisting refugees in Corsica. After the war, she married the Labour politician Will Arnold-Forster, and became the first woman magistrate in Cornwall. She and her husband were instrumental in founding Gordonstoun School in Scotland in 1934. Her sudden death at the age of 51 fuelled speculation of involvement in the occult.

== Early life ==
Katherine Laird Cox, known as "Ka", (Note: Ka, pronounced Kar, a name she adopted in January 1911) was the daughter of Henry Fisher Cox (Note: Henry Fisher Cox, born 27 April 1848, son of Rev. Edward Cox, rector of Luccombe, Somerset, born in Parwich, Derbyshire, educated at Trinity College, Cambridge. Brother of the historian, Dr John Charles Cox) and his wife, Jane Thompson Laird. Cox was a wealthy stockbroker and Fabian. Ka was raised in "Hook Hill", a house designed by Horace Field and commissioned by her father at Hook Heath, near Woking, Surrey in 1893. Ka was the second of three daughters, her sisters being Hester Laird Cox and Margaret Anna Laird Cox. Ka's mother, who had been in poor health, died in 1900 when Ka was only 13. Her father later remarried and had two further daughters, Winifred and Sydney, by his second wife Edith. Ka attended St. Felix School, Southwold in Suffolk, "a school where girls are treated like sensible creatures", then considered a feeder school for Newnham College, Cambridge. Ka's father died suddenly on 19 January 1905, when she was 18, with an estate of £22,000, leaving her and her sisters financially independent. Ka was left in the slightly unusual position for a young woman of her class and time of now being free to live, travel, and love as she pleased. Her stepmother continued to live at "Hook Hill" for a further five years before moving to a smaller house, also designed by Horace Field, further down the hill, called "Hook Hill Cottage" (1910), for a further ten years.

== Cambridge, Neo-Pagans and Bloomsbury ==
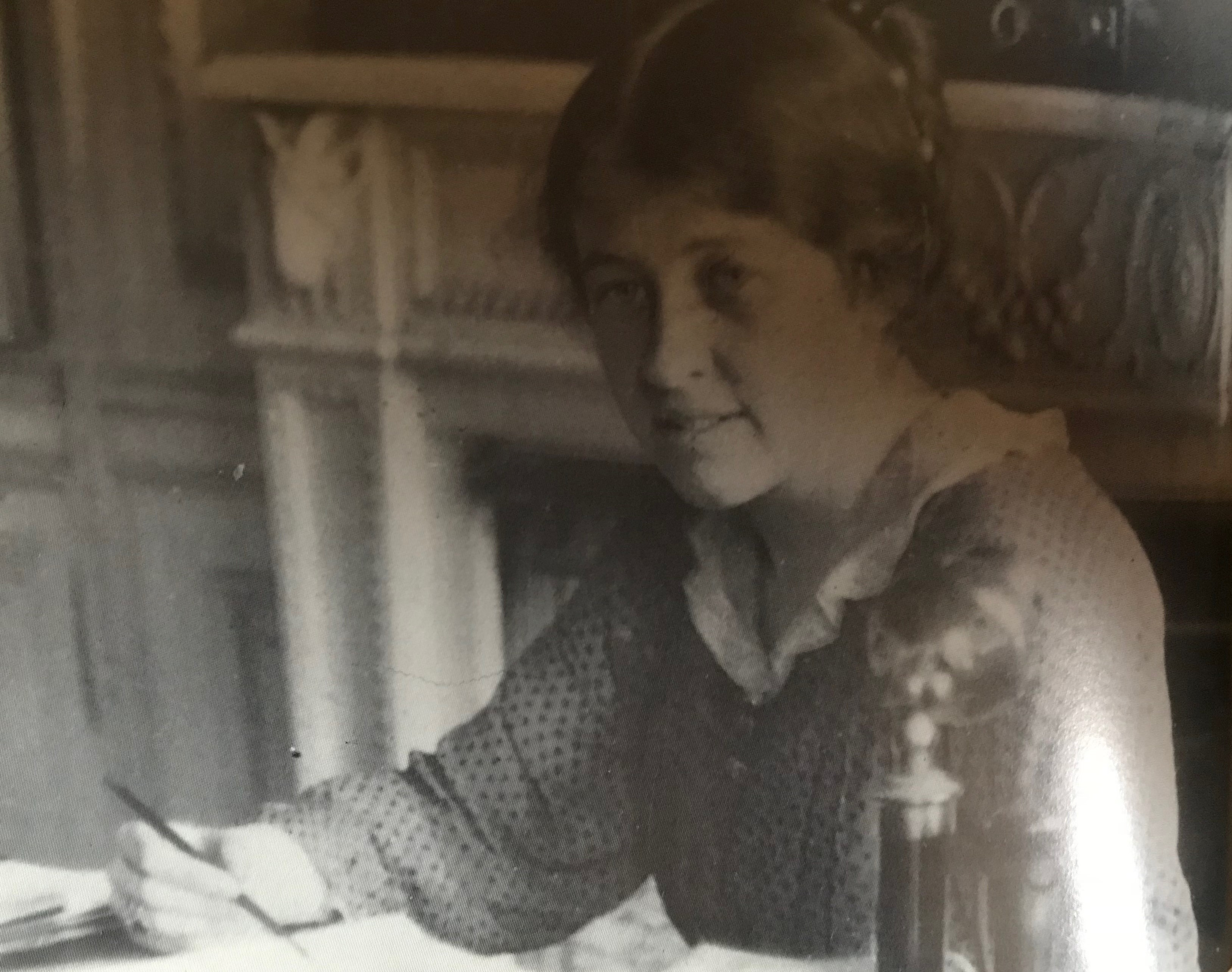
Undated photograph

In 1906, Ka first encountered the Bloomsbury Group, attending some of Vanessa Bell's Friday Club fine arts discussions at Gordon Square. She frequently posed for Duncan Grant, and one of his portraits of her was submitted to Roger Fry's second Post-Impressionist exhibition in 1912.

Ka was described as having a sweet nature and while not conventionally pretty, having a fresh clear-skinned appearance that was appealing. She was said to be an aesthete, wearing diaphanous clothing with Peter Pan collars, "a miracle of poise, maturity and charm", who appealed equally to women and men. She made her own clothes, and Gwen Darwin describes her "standing on the very edge of the cliff, her crimson skirt whirling in the wind, her head tied up in a blue handkerchief, and the gulls screaming below". Other accounts describe her as the "lumpy, lovable Ka Cox, who was motherly and very sexy...a heroine who goes through reversals of fortune".

=== Rupert Brooke and the Neo-Pagans ===
Later in 1906, Ka went up to Newnham College, Cambridge, where she read history, graduating in 1910. There, she joined the Fabian Society, which at that time admitted members from the women's colleges and was one of the few places at the university that men and women could meet on equal terms, and which espoused women's rights and feminism. At Cambridge, she was considered one of the emancipated "new women". She became the second treasurer of the Cambridge Fabian Society, succeeding Amber Reeves (Note: Amber Reeves was also H. G. Wells' mistress) (co-founder of the society in 1905), where she met Rupert Brooke (1887–1915). Brooke, who had also gone up to Cambridge (King's) to read classics in 1906, was a member of the steering committee of the Fabians and President (1909–1910). Brooke was also a member of the Cambridge Apostles, and after graduating in 1909 had taken up residence in nearby Grantchester, switching to English Literature and continuing his association with the university, working on a dissertation. In 1910 he had become engaged to Noël Olivier, but broke it off the following year, although continuing the relationship.

Ka became part of Brooke's circle, which also included Jacques Raverat and Gwen Darwin, a group that coalesced around him from 1908 till his death in 1915, and which later came to be dubbed the Neo-Pagans. The membership of this group was drawn largely from the two societies in which men and women mixed, the Fabian Society and the Marlowe Dramatic Society (founded by Brooke). Another unifying feature was that many of them had been to school at Bedales, a progressive co-educational institution that emphasised the outdoor life. One of the Neo-Pagan rules was comradely chastity "We don’t copulate without marriage" (Brooke), which turned out to be difficult to sustain. The group started to form in early 1908, when Rupert Brooke began putting together a production of Milton's Comus for performance in July. Ka, together with a number of other young women, were drawn in to work on the costumes, while Brooke started to draw up rules, such as asking them to forswear engagement or marriage for six months.

Initially Ka formed a relationship with Raverat, and in 1908 they had begun conducting a courtship by correspondence, due to Raverat's ill health obliging him to recuperate in Switzerland. By June 1910, he decided he was in love with her, proposing to her on a number of occasions but she constantly offered only friendship in exchange. Eventually he suggested a triangular marriage with Darwin, but although Darwin initially gave the matter serious consideration, (Note: Virginia Stephen explained to her sister that Raverat loved them both and wanted to marry Darwin for her mind but have Ka for her body, and that Darwin thought Ka would bear the children while she painted. Letter to Vanessa Bell, 19 April 1911) both women eventually rejected the idea, Darwin requesting Ka to discontinue the relationship. (Note: Gwen Darwin, letter to Cox April 1911)

Through 1910, Brooke was becoming increasingly frustrated with the way Noël was keeping him at arm's length and thinking increasingly about Ka. By 1911, Brooke had decided he was in love with Ka, who was increasingly pushing Raverat in the direction of Darwin, and Ka and Brooke became involved. She made his clothes for him (Note: Yeats much admired Brooke's clothes, that Ka made for him, stating he "wears the most beautiful shirts") but like many of the women in Brooke's life resisted a physical relationship, initially but eventually she yielded to him by March 1912. Raverat, noting Ka's progressive attachment to Brooke, and her refusal of his own proposal, became engaged to Darwin. Some light on this complex relationship is provided in Gwen Darwin's unfinished novel (started in 1916 and set in 1906) in which she depicts Ka as a character named Barbara.

Brooke wrote incessantly to Ka, who provided him with both existential passion and a calming domestic presence. "When I shut my eyes and whisper your name over, I can feel your hands and face and hair above and about me" (26 January 1912). Her involvement with Brooke placed her in a further complicated series of triangular relationships, with Brooke's simultaneous attachment to both Noël Olivier and her sister Brynhild Olivier (Bryn), and Cox with Henry Lamb, who was in turn involved with Lytton Strachey. After Christmas 1911, Brooke travelled to Lulworth in Dorset to be with Ka and her friends, including Henry Lamb. On being told about Lamb, Brooke proposed to Ka, but she refused him and told him she loved Lamb. The breakup between Cox and Brooke is thought to have contributed to Brooke's breakdown in January 1912. However Ka and Brooke were together again by the end of the month, living in Munich during February. They continued to see each other and in late 1912 she was pregnant and had a miscarriage, or possibly stillbirth. Ka contemplated marriage, but both Lamb and Brooke were turning elsewhere, Brooke continuing to pursue both Noël and Bryn, but was firmly resisted. There were at least five other women in Brooke's life at this time, Phyllis Gardner, like Gwen Darwin, an art student at the Slade, the actress Cathleen Nesbitt, Elizabeth van Rysselberghe, daughter of the Belgian artist Théo van Rysselberghe, Lady Eileen Wellesley, daughter of the 4th Duke of Wellington, and during 1913 a Tahitian woman named Taatamata.

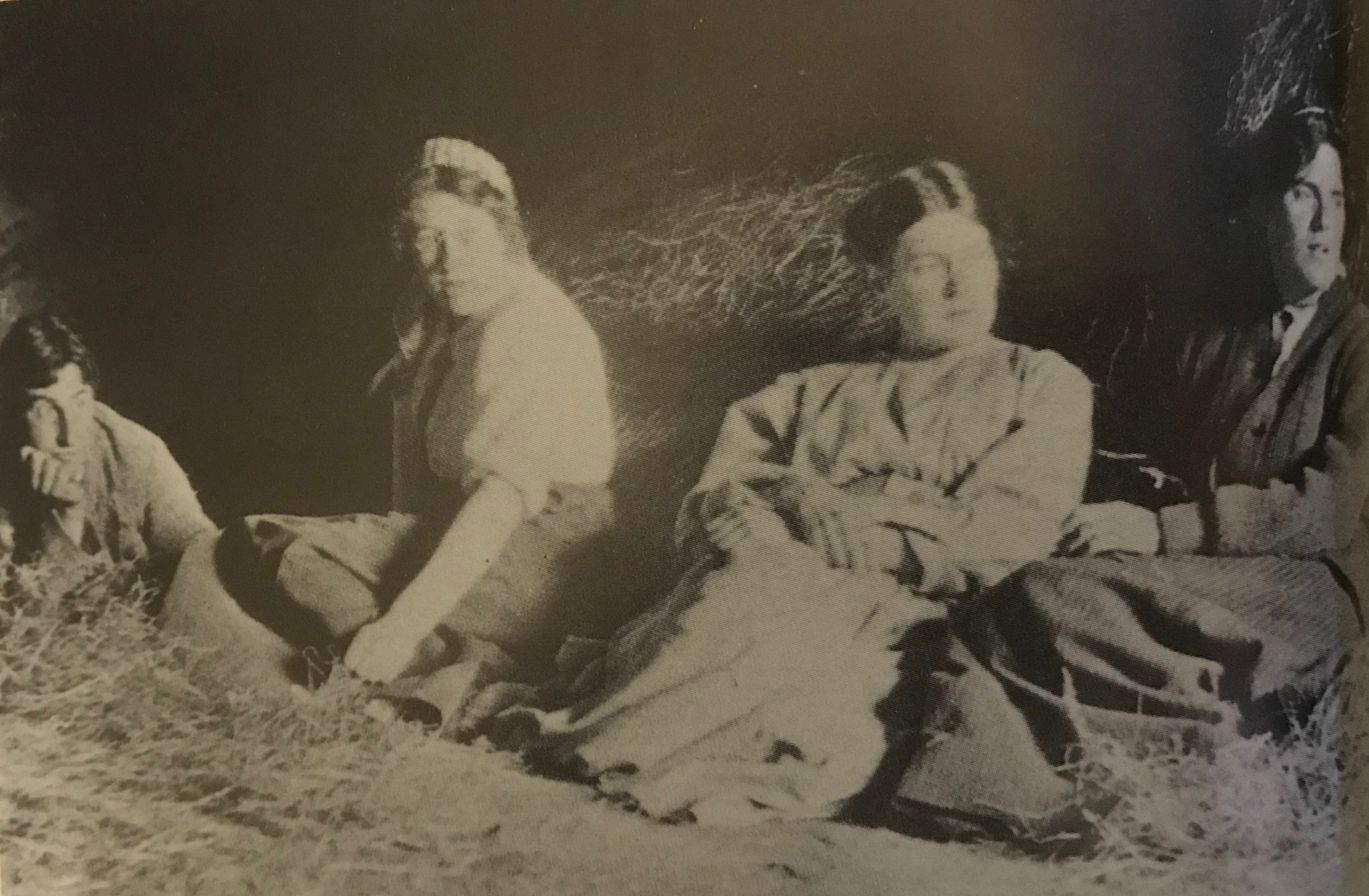
Neo-pagans: Jacques Raverat, Ka Cox, Gwen Raverat, Frances Cornford 1912

After Brooke enlisted on 15 September 1914 following the outbreak of World War I, he continued to appeal to Ka's motherly side (rather than his own mother), constantly requesting equipment and the comforts of home. Like the others, Ka continued to receive correspondence from Brooke (Note: Her letters were destroyed) right up to his death, the last letter poignantly beginning "I suppose you’re about the best I can do in the way of a widow" (10 March 1915).

By the time of her fourth year at Newnham, her social work projects meant she spent increasing amounts of time in London, staying at the flat she shared with her sister Hester in Petty France, Westminster, which in turn became a gathering place for Neo-Pagans. Although she had aspirations to become a writer, she was also trying to put her socialism into practice by, as Raverat put it "burying herself in the slums". On leaving Newnham in 1910, Ka divided her time between London and the family cottage in Woking ("Hook Hill Cottage"), where Rupert Brooke was a frequent visitor. Cottage life enabled her to pursue the Simple Life, (Note: Popularised by Edward Carpenter in his essay Simplification of Life in his England's Ideal (1887)) favoured by the Neo-Pagans, on her own.

=== Virginia Woolf and Bloomsbury ===
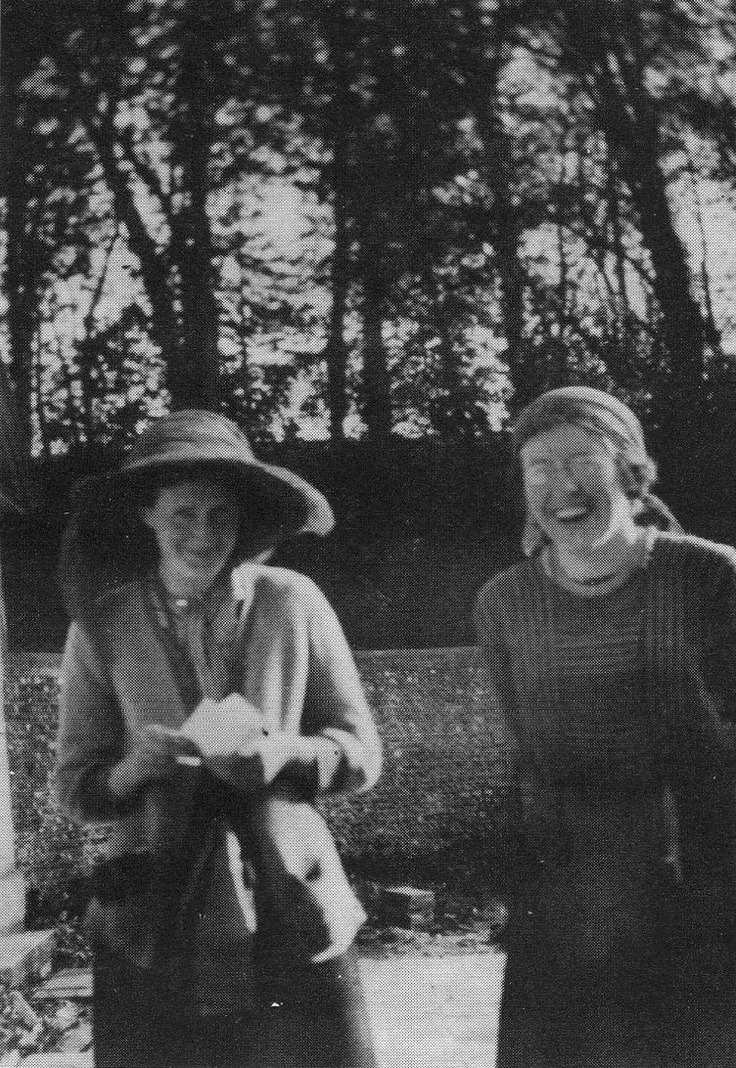
Virginia Stephen (L) with Katherine Cox, Asham 1912

Through Brooke's circle, Ka met Virginia Woolf (then Virginia Stephen), who was associated with the group during 1911 and 1912. The meeting took place at Bertrand Russell's house near Oxford on a weekend in January 1911, through a mutual friend, Ray Costelloe, (Note: Ray would later marry Oliver Strachey, older brother of Lytton Strachey) niece of Alys Russell, Bertrand's wife. Also there was Ray's younger sister Karin Costelloe, who was to marry Virginia's younger brother Adrian Stephen, and Marjorie Strachey, sister of Lytton Strachey, all of whom were Newnhamites. Virginia, who unlike her brothers, was deprived of a Cambridge education, was fascinated by these young women graduates.

Both women had lost their parents at similar ages, and Virginia had an association with Newnham, her cousin Katharine Stephen, being Librarian, Vice-Principal and then from 1911 Principal there, and having had to chaperone the Stephen sisters on their visits to Cambridge. After meeting Ka, who was five years her junior, Virginia described her as being in "the heart of young womanhood", "Miss Cox is one of the younger Newnhamites...She is a bright, intelligent, nice creature; who has, she says, very few emotions". Virginia and Ka soon became friends, with Ka frequently being summoned to help when Virginia became ill. She also became a confidante and correspondent of Woolf, who bestowed on her the nickname "Bruin".

The Stephen sisters dubbed Brooke and his energetic outdoors circle as "Neo-Pagans", Virginia at least seeing them as a viable rural alternative to Bloomsbury. A further connection between Woolf and Brooke was that her brother, Adrian Stephen, was among Noël Olivier's many suitors. (Note: Thoby Stephen was an apostle, though Adrian Stephen was not.) Woolf thus created a brief connection between the two circles of Edwardian intellectuals, Bloomsbury and Neo-Pagan.

Ka had planned to help share Virginia's house on Brunswick Square in 1911, but abandoned this under pressure from Brooke who was turning against the Bloomsbury Group, partly because of Ka's attraction to Virginia, describing it as a "bawdy house", an appellation he shared with other Neo-Pagans. (Note: Darwin later explained to Woolf "he tried so hard to prevent all his friends whom he considered young and innocent from being enticed into your bawdy houses at Bloomsbury" Letter 22 April 1925) In 1913, Ka found Woolf unconscious from an overdose of veronal, and her prompt intervention saved her life. The two women gradually lost touch with each other after Ka married, and Virginia was rather critical of the match, which she deemed unromantic. Ka rightly sensed this, writing to Virginia "I feel you will probably not like Will".

Ka was later to become the inspiration for Mary Datchett in Woolf's Night and Day (1919).

== Marriage ==
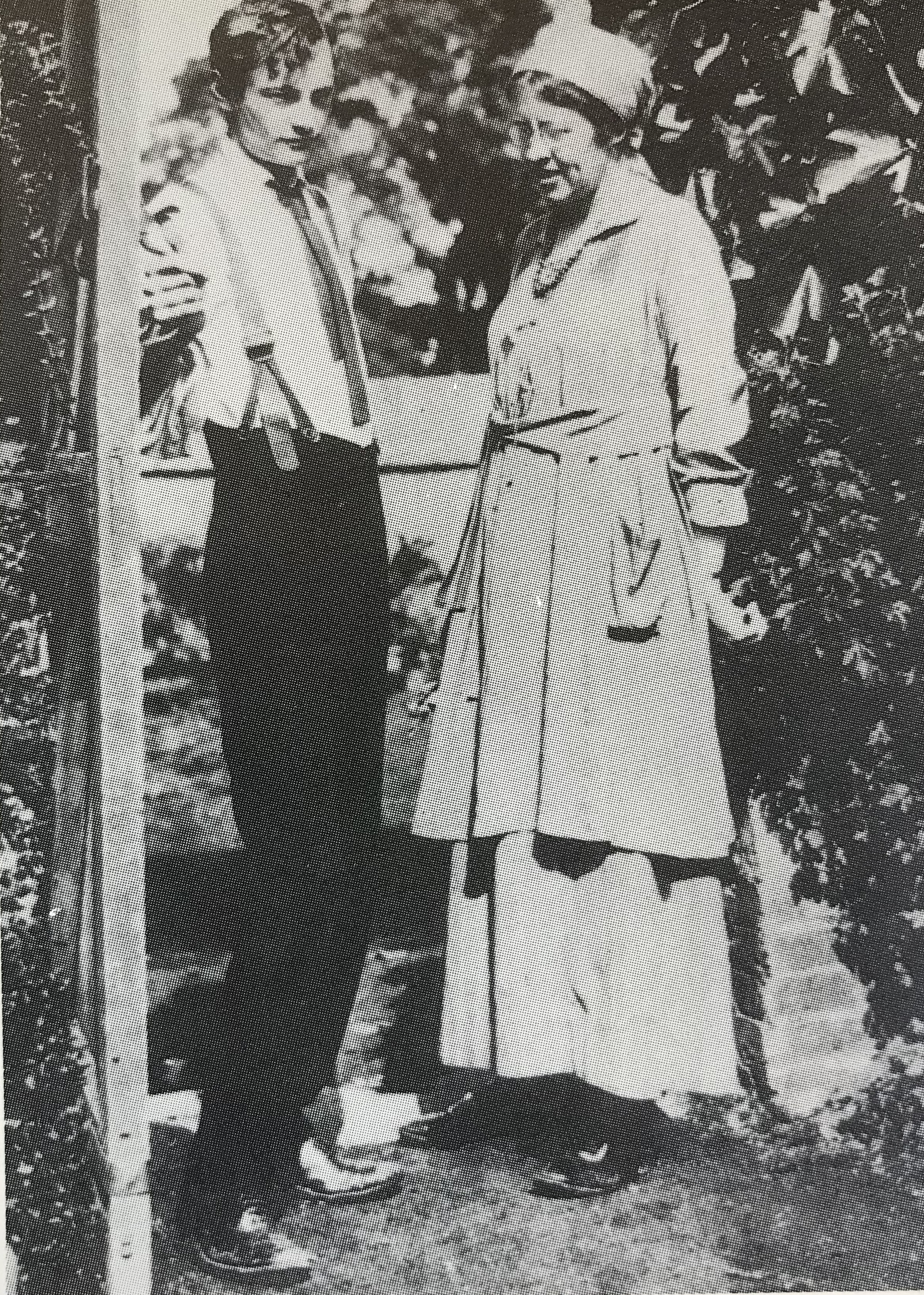
Will and Ka ca. 1917

After the war, Ka married William Arnold-Forster, a naval officer, in 1918 and they moved to Cornwall, living in a large house called "The Eagle's Nest" at Zennor, (Note: The house and area has a long history of association with the literary and artistic community. Its occupants have included Patrick Heron) on the coast near St Ives. Initially they rented, then purchased the house in 1921, where her husband planted a garden that was considered remarkable. Her husband was active in the Labour Party, where he worked on international relations, publishing and speaking extensively on peace and disarmament. In 1920 she gave birth to their only son, the author and journalist Mark Arnold-Forster (1920–1981).

== Death ==
Ka died suddenly on 23 May 1938 while her husband was away on a peace mission in North America. Her death has been surrounded by many myths and legends, largely involving Aleister Crowley and witchcraft, although there is no credible evidence to support these claims. Her estate at the time of her death was £6,427.

== Work ==
In addition to her activities with the Fabian Society, Ka lectured at Morley College and worked actively for women's suffrage together with her sister Hester. Hester had formed a branch of the Women's Social and Political Union in Woking in 1909, and was its secretary till 1913. Another local activist, and Bloomsbury member, was Ethel Smythe.

She contributed to The Guardian's "Country Diary" column.

During the First World War, a Women's International Congress was held in April 1915 at The Hague, in the Netherlands, which was a neutral state. Ka was one of the 156 British delegates (the British General Committee), but all but three were prevented from crossing the North Sea by Winston Churchill. In January 1916, Ka answered a call for volunteers from the Serbian Relief Fund to work with refugees in Corsica. (Note: With the occupation of Serbia, large numbers of refugees fled west across the Balkans. Allied rescue efforts disembarked many of these in Corsica) She was awarded the MBE for this work, but declined it. Later she worked at the Admiralty, where she met her future husband, Lieutenant Commander William Arnold-Forster. In Germany in 1933 she worked for the release of Kurt Hahn from the Nazis, and with her husband helped him establish Gordonstoun School in 1934. In Cornwall, she became the first woman to be appointed as a magistrate.

== In popular culture ==
The circumstances of Ka's death have been the subject of a number of novels.

== Bibliography ==
=== Books, theses and articles ===
- Abbot, Maurice (Spring 2000). "A short life of J. Charles Cox" (PDF). Derbyshire Miscellany. 15 (5): 127–133.
- Crawford, Elizabeth (2006). The Women's Suffrage Movement in Britain and Ireland: A Regional Survey. Taylor & Francis. ISBN 978-0-415-38332-5.
- Forrester, John; Cameron, Laura (2017). Freud in Cambridge. Cambridge University Press. ISBN 978-0-521-86190-8.
- Glendinning, Victoria (2006). Leonard Woolf: A Biography. Simon and Schuster. ISBN 978-0-7432-4653-8.
- Lubenow, W. C. (1998). The Cambridge Apostles, 1820-1914: Liberalism, Imagination, and Friendship in British Intellectual and Professional Life. Cambridge University Press. ISBN 978-0-521-57213-2.
- Oldfield, Sybil (1989). "Proposal for a Short Collaborative Research Project in British Women's History". History Workshop Journal. 27 (1): 176–178. doi:10.1093/hwj/27.1.176.
- Spalding, Frances (2010). Gwen Raverat: Friends, Family and Affections. Random House. ISBN 978-1-4090-2941-0.
- Spence, Richard B. (2008). Secret Agent 666: Aleister Crowley, British Intelligence and the Occult. Feral House. ISBN 978-1-932595-33-8.
- Storr, Katherine (2009). Excluded from the Record: Women, Refugees, and Relief, 1914-1929. Peter Lang. ISBN 978-3-03911-855-7.
- Veevers, Nick; Allison, Pete (2011). Kurt Hahn. Springer Science & Business Media. ISBN 978-94-6091-469-0.

Rupert Brooke

- Brooke, Rupert; Strachey, James (1998). Hale, Keith (ed.). Friends and Apostles: The Correspondence of Rupert Brooke and James Strachey, 1905-1914. Yale University Press. ISBN 978-0-300-07004-0.
- Delany, Paul (1987). The Neo-pagans: Rupert Brooke and the ordeal of youth. Free Press. ISBN 978-0-02-908280-5.
  - Annan, Gabriele (3 September 1987). "Stuffing". London Review of Books (Review). 9 (15): 20–21. ISSN 0260-9592.
- Delany, Paul (2015). Fatal Glamour: The Life of Rupert Brooke. MQUP. ISBN 978-0-7735-8278-1.
- Jones, Nigel (2014) [1999 Metro Books]. Rupert Brooke: Life, Death and Myth. Head of Zeus. ISBN 978-1-78185-715-1.
  - Parker, Peter (23 October 1999). "Rupert Brooke: a bundle of prejudice and insanity?". The Daily Telegraph (Review).
- Miller, Alisa (2018). Rupert Brooke in the First World War. Oxford University Press. ISBN 978-1-942954-34-7.
- Read, Mike (2015). Forever England: The Life of Rupert Brooke. Biteback Publishing. ISBN 978-1-84954-866-3.
- McNicol, Jean (20 October 2016). "Something Rather Scandalous". London Review of Books. 38 (20): 19–22. ISSN 0260-9592.
- Schoenle, Tracy Charity (1997). Rupert Brooke: ' An organized chance of living again ' (MA thesis). Iowa State University.

Virginia Woolf

- Bell, Quentin (1972). Virginia Woolf: A Biography. Harcourt Brace Jovanovich. ISBN 978-0-15-693580-7.
  - Vol. I: Virginia Stephen 1882 to 1912. London: Hogarth Press. 1972.
  - Vol. II: Virginia Woolf 1912 to 1941. London: Hogarth Press. 1972.
- Gordon, Lyndall (1984). Virginia Woolf: A Writer's Life. Oxford University Press. ISBN 978-0-19-811723-0.
- Hill-Miller, Katherine (2001). From the Lighthouse to Monk's House: A Guide to Virginia Woolf's Literary Landscapes. Duckworth. ISBN 978-0-7156-2995-6.
- Lee, Hermione (1999) [1996]. Virginia Woolf. Vintage Books. ISBN 978-0-375-70136-8. (excerpt - Chapter 1)
  - Merkin, Daphne (8 June 1997). "This Loose, Drifting Material of Life". New York Times (Review).
- Levenback, Karen L. (1999). Virginia Woolf and the Great War. Syracuse University Press. ISBN 978-0-8156-0546-1.
- Webb, Ruth (2000). Virginia Woolf. British Library. ISBN 9780712346160.
- Woolf, Virginia (2004) [1922]. Night and Day. 1st World Publishing. ISBN 978-1-59540-530-2. see also Night and Day & Complete text
- Woolf, Virginia; Raverat, Gwen; Raverat, Jacques (2003). Pryor, William (ed.). Virginia Woolf & the Raverats: A Different Sort of Friendship. Clear Books. ISBN 978-1-904555-02-5.
- — (1975–1980). Nicolson, Nigel; Banks, Joanne Trautmann (eds.). The Letters of Virginia Woolf 6 vols. New York: Harcourt Brace Jovanovich. ISBN 978-0-15-150926-3.
  - — (1977). The Letters of Virginia Woolf Volume One 1888–1912. Harcourt Brace Jovanovich. ISBN 978-0-15-650881-0.

=== Websites ===
- Winter, Jane (2018). "Ka Cox and Will Arnold-Forster".
- Castle, Jack (6 November 2015). "Growing up with the St Ives School". Impressionist & Modern Art. Christie's. Archived from the original on 21 May 2016.
- "William Edward Arnold Forster". Cornwall Artists Index.
- "Cox, Katherine Laird 'Ka'". Introduction to archives: Rupert Brooke (Biographies). King's College, Cambridge.
- Gibbons, Fiachra (10 March 2000). "Love letters expose the patriot poet". The Guardian.
- Grant, Duncan (1913). "Katherine Cox (1887-1934)". Art Collections Online. National Museum Wales.
- Grant, Duncan (1912). "Seated Woman, Ka Cox (recto)". Art and Architecture. Courtauld Institute.
- "The Cox family and the houses on Hook Hill". Hook Heath Residents' Association.
  - Dare, David. "The houses associated with Hook Hill: Hook Hill Cottage".
- Wakeford, Iain (2016). "The houses of Hook Heath" (PDF). Woking's history & heritage.
- "Find a will. Index to wills and administrations (1858-1995)". Calendars of the Grants of Probate and Letters of Administration. The National Archives.
- "Cox, Henry Fisher (CS867HF)". A Cambridge Alumni Database. University of Cambridge.
- "The UK 1911 Census". UK Census Online.
- "The UK 1901 Census". UK Census Online.
- Pryor, William (19 August 2012). "Creative Myths of Cambridge". The Raverat Archive.
- Norton, Rictor (1998). "The Beginning. The Gay Love Letters of Rupert Brooke". Gay Love Letters through the Centuries: Rupert Brooke.
- Maybin, Neil. "Rupert Brooke's Life". Rupert Brooke on Skyros.
