= Martin Pugh (historian) =

British historian

Martin Pugh FRHistS
- Born: Martin D. Pugh; 1947 (age 78–79)

Academic background
- Education: University of Bristol
- Thesis: The Background to the 1918 Representation of the People Act (1974)

Academic work
- Discipline: History
- Sub-discipline: Late-modern British history
- Institutions: Newcastle University

Martin D. Pugh (born 1947) is a British historian who specialises in the women's, political, and social history of Nineteenth and Twentieth Century Britain.

== Biography ==
Pugh has held professorships at Newcastle University and Liverpool John Moores University, and is a fellow of the Royal Historical Society. He has written 19 articles for the Oxford Dictionary of National Biography. Pugh also sits on the board of BBC History magazine.

== Bibliography ==
- Lloyd George (Profiles in Power) (1988)
- The March of the Women: A revisionist analysis of the campaign for women's suffrage, 1866-1914 (2000)
- Women and the Women's Movement in Britain, 1914-1999 (2000)
- The Making of Modern British Politics: 1867–1945, 3rd edition (2002)
- We Danced All Night: A Social History of Britain Between the Wars (2008)
- The Pankhursts: The History of One Radical Family (2009)
- Speak for Britain! A New History of the Labour Party (2010)
- Britain: Unification and Disintegration (2012)
- State and Society: A Social and Political History of Britain since 1870 (2012)
- 'Hurrah for the Blackshirts!': Fascists and Fascism in Britain Between the Wars (2013)
- State and Society: A Social and Political History of Britain Since 1870, 5th edition (2017)
- Britain and Islam: A History from 622 to the Present Day (2019)
