= Herbert Park =

Road and public park in Ballsbridge, Dublin, Ireland

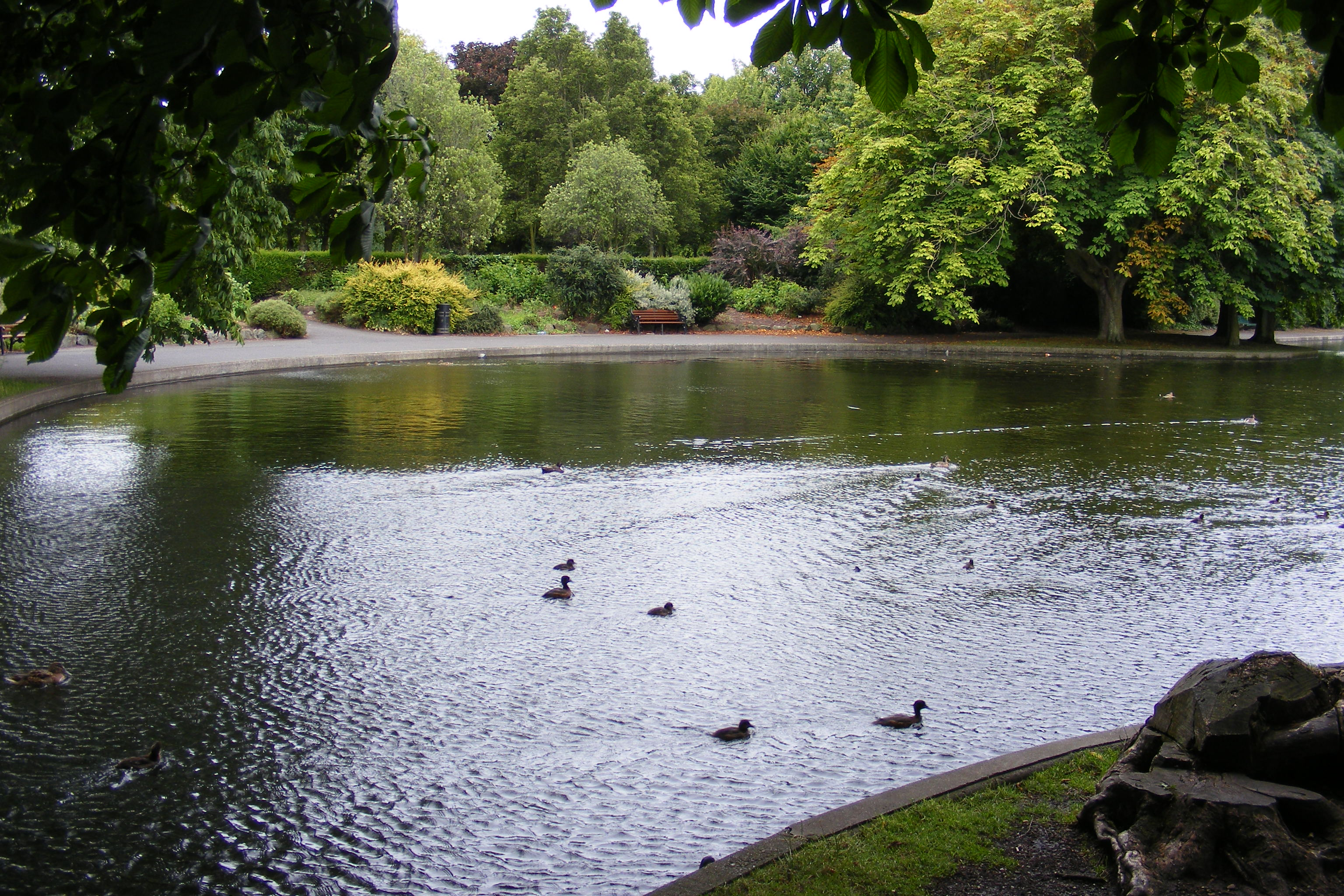

- Location within Dublin
- Nearest city: Dublin
- Coordinates: 53.3274°N 6.2355°W
- Area: 13 hectares (32 acres)
- Website: www.dublincity.ie/main-menu-services-recreation-culture-dublin-city-parks-visit-park/herbert-park

Herbert Park (road)
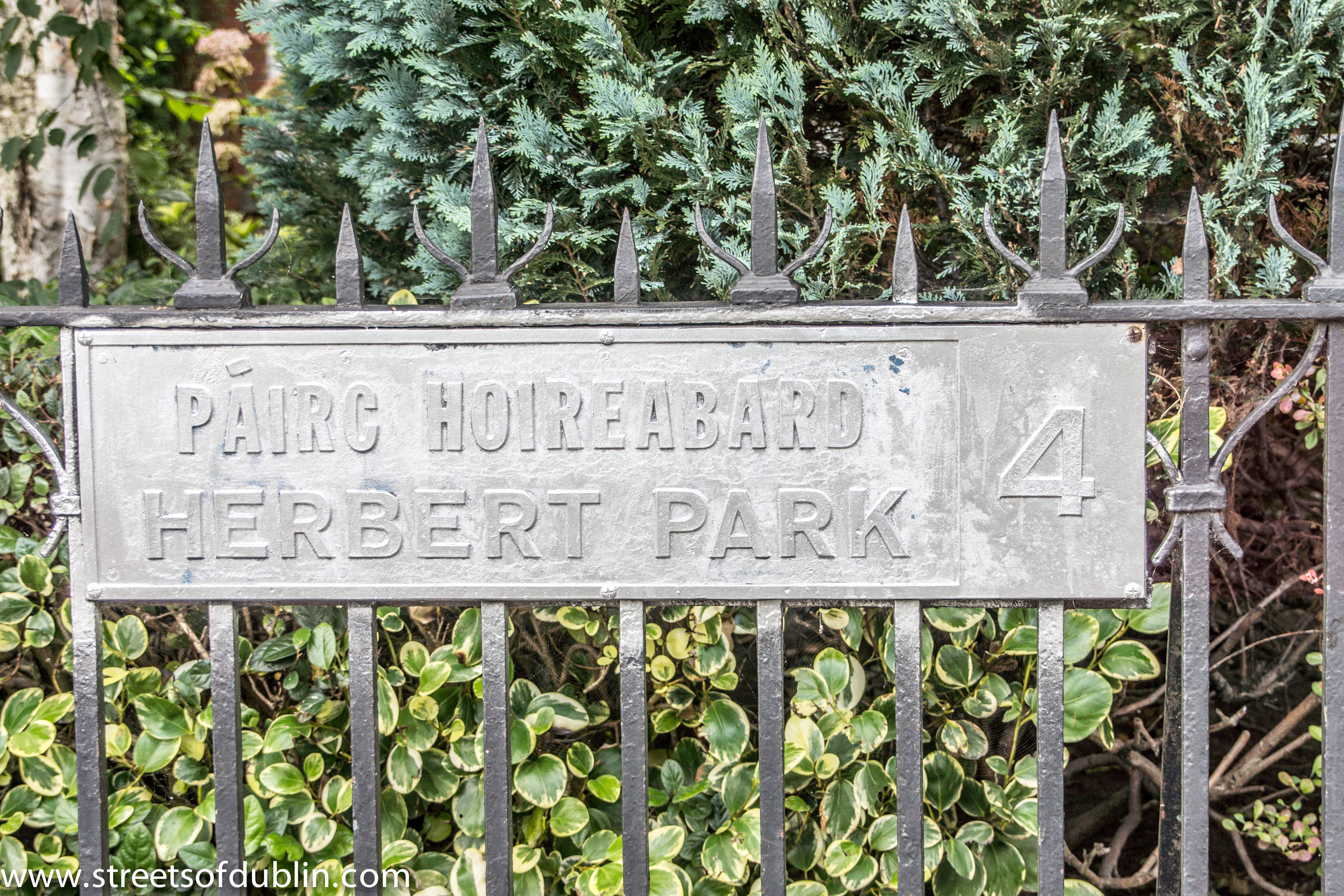
- Interactive map of Herbert Park (road)
- Native name: Páirc Hoirbeaird (Irish); Páirc Hoireabard (Irish)
- Namesake: Sidney Herbert, 14th Earl of Pembroke
- Length: 750 m (2,460 ft)
- Width: 17.5 metres (57 ft)
- Location: Ballsbridge, Dublin, Ireland
- Postal code: D04
- west end: Morehampton Road, Marlborough Road
- east end: Pembroke Road, Elgin Road

Herbert Park (Irish: Páirc Hoirbeaird) is the name of a road and a public park in Ballsbridge, Dublin.

== History ==
The land used for the park was given to the city by the 14th Earl of Pembroke whose family name was Herbert. In 1907, the World Fair known as the Irish International Exhibition was held in Ballsbridge. When the structures had been dismantled, the site was developed as the current public park, with the bandstand and pond being the only remaining structures from the time. It is now maintained by Dublin City Council. The former site of the Johnston, Mooney & O'Brien bakery bordered the park and when that site was redeveloped as the Herbert Park Hotel, a new entrance was opened at the easternmost end of the park.

The park bandstand was featured in the video for Phil Lynott's song Old Town.

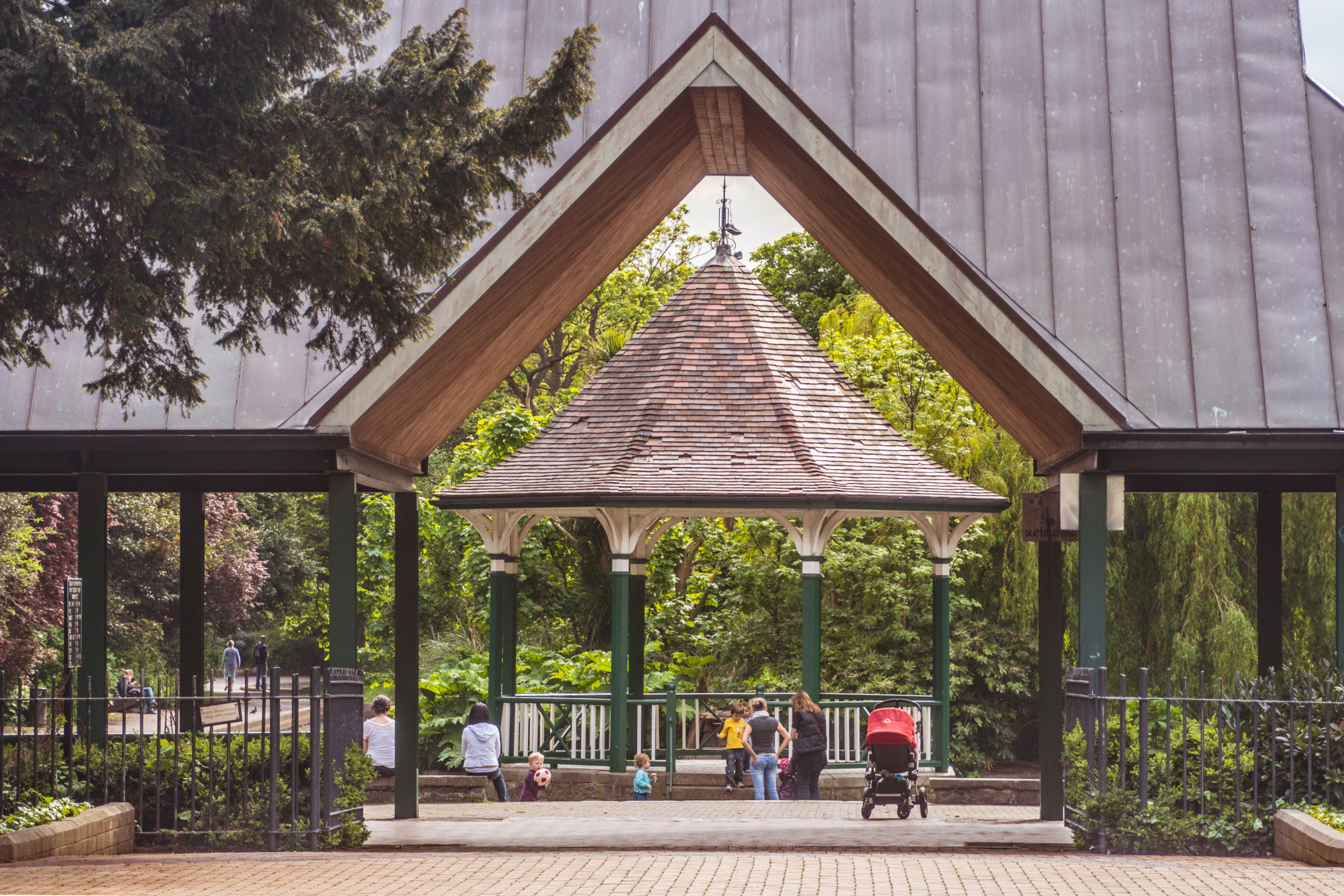
The Herbert Park bandstand. The structure dates from the Irish International Exhibition of 1907

== Amenities ==
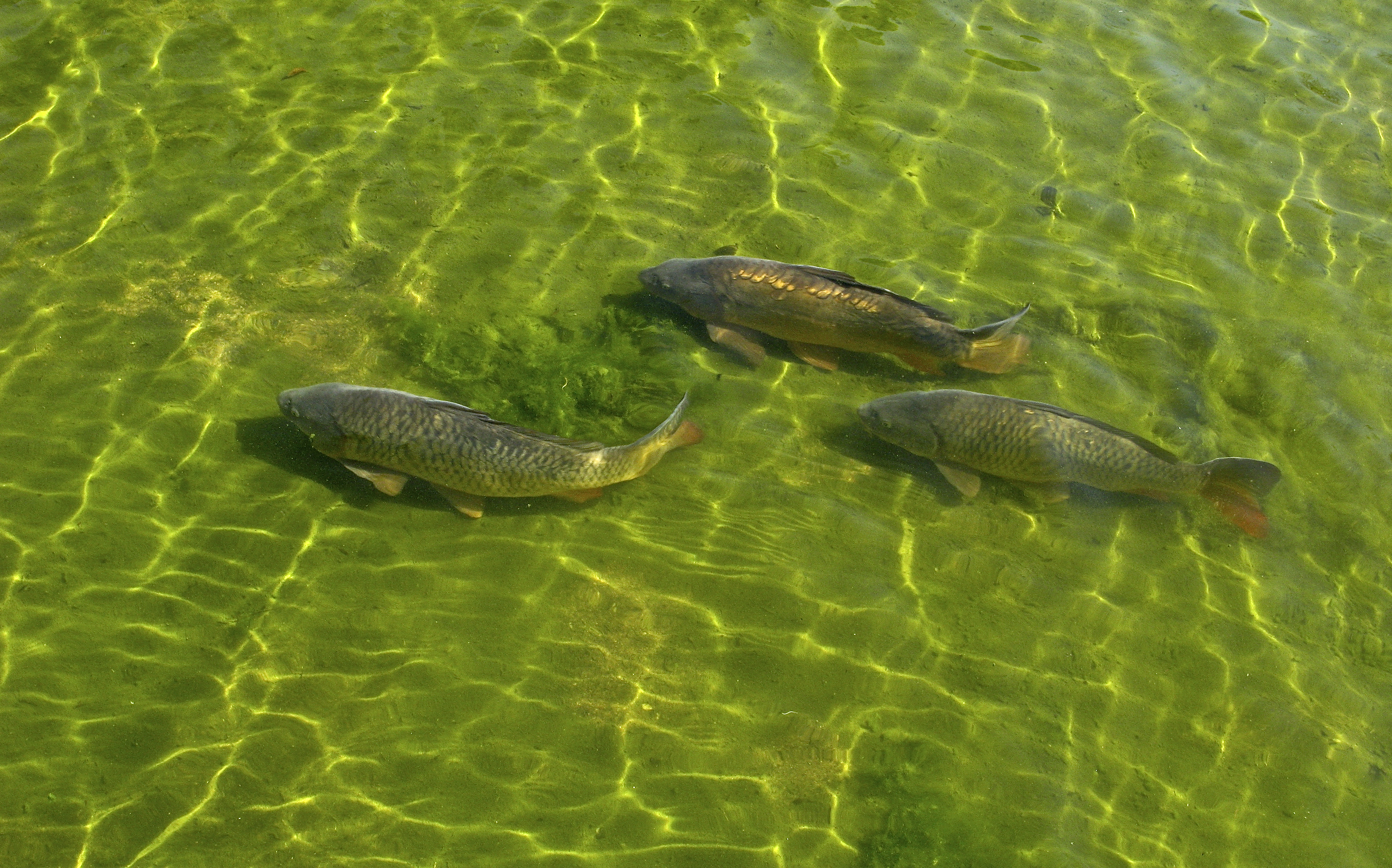
Common and Mirror Carp in the pond, Herbert Park, Dublin, Ireland

The park is thirty-two acres in size and is in two halves, divided by a road, also called Herbert Park. A full circuit of the park's perimeter is almost exactly one mile (1.57 km), a fact used by runners and walkers to measure their progress. The larger half, on the south side of the road, is bounded by the River Dodder, houses, and includes a number of soccer pitches, formal gardens, and a large duck pond and an older public children's playground. A gazebo is also present in the northeastern corner of the park at the entrance to the Herbert Park Hotel.

The northern half is home to the newly refurbished public children's playground, a number of tennis courts, and the bowling green of Herbert Park Bowling Club.

The park's pond has proven to be an excellent location for breeding carp. In February 2006 the pond was nearly completely emptied for cleaning to take place. The carp were removed to alternative locations. These carp were up to 2 feet (0.61 m) in length. In spring 2009, the pond was re-stocked (see picture).

== See also ==
- List of streets and squares in Dublin
