= Florence Vere O'Brien =

British diarist, philanthropist and craftswoman (1854–1936)

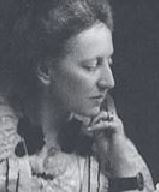
- Born: Florence Mary Arnold; 3 July 1854; Bayswater, London, United Kingdom of Great Britain and Ireland
- Died: 8 July 1936 (aged 82); Ballyalla, County Clare, Ireland
- Known for: establishment of The Limerick Lace School and Clare Embroidery
- Parent(s): William Delafield Arnold and Frances Anne Arnold
- Relatives: Thomas Arnold, Matthew Arnold, William Edward Forster

Florence Vere O'Brien born Florence Mary Arnold became Florence Arnold-Forster (3 July 1854 – 8 July 1936) was a British diarist, philanthropist, and craftswoman. She set up The Limerick Lace School and Clare Embroidery.

== Early life ==
Florence Vere O'Brien was born Florence Mary Arnold in Bayswater, London, on 3 July 1854. She was the second of four children of William Delafield Arnold and Frances Anne Arnold (née Hodgson). Her father was the son of Thomas Arnold and brother of the poet Matthew Arnold. He served in the Indian army from 1850, later being appointed in the civil service becoming director of public instruction in Punjab in 1856. When Frances Anne Arnold died in India in March 1858, the children were sent back to England in January 1859 by ship by their father. He intended on joining them in England, but during the journey overland he became seriously ill and died in Gibraltar on 9 April 1859. The children were raised by their aunt Jane (née Arnold) and William Edward Forster, becoming so close that the children formally decided to adopt the name Arnold-Forster when the youngest sister, Frances, came of age in 1878.

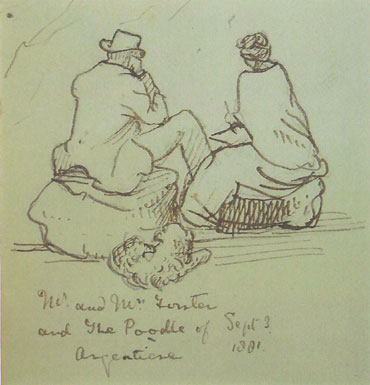
Her 1881 sketch of Mr and Mrs Forster

From a young age, O'Brien was an avid letter writer, diarist and artist, who travelled from age 14 around continental Europe with her stepfather. She had a keen interest in European and British politics, in particular following the fortunes of the liberal party. After visiting Budapest in 1876, she researched and wrote a biography of Ferenc Deák which she published anonymously in 1881 in English and Hungarian. O'Brien visited Ireland for the first time in 1878 on holiday. In May 1880 she returned during William Forster's first official visit as chief secretary for Ireland. During the two years of his service in this position, O'Brien spent most of her time in Dublin, whilst there she became part of numerous political and social circles. From her journals, she shows an interest in political developments in Ireland as well as a distrust of the Land League and Irish nationalism. The journal covers all elements of her interests including the politics, family life, and society of Victorian Britain and Ireland. Later published as Florence Arnold-Forster's Irish Journal, the journal offers a rare account of the everyday experience of Irish administration at a critical period in the Irish Land War. The book received a number of reviews in major publications.

She moved to Ireland permanently after her marriage to Robert (Robin) Vere O'Brien on 10 July 1883 and lived at Newhall House and Estate. Her husband, who was from Oldchurch, County Limerick, served as a clerk of the peace at Ennis Courthouse, and as an agent to the Inchiquin and de Vere estates. The couple had two daughters, Jane Elinor and Florence Margaret, and two sons, Aubrey William and Hugh Murrough. The couple lived with Robert's mother and sister at Oldchurch where three of their children were born, before moving to County Clare.

== Work with the lace industry ==
Upon her move to County Limerick, O'Brien set about supporting the failing Limerick lace industry. She made contact with local lace craftswomen, and provided them with high quality materials as well as her own designs. From this she arranged the sale of the work, using her circle of friends in Dublin and London. O'Brien was a central figure in the foundation of the Private Committee for Promoting Irish Lace, with the support of Alan Cole of the Department of Science and Art, South Kensington and James Brenan RHA. This committee led to the establishment of the lace training school in Limerick in May 1889, and in 1893 on the committee's request her took over the running of the school. When her family moved to New Hall, near Ennis, County Clare, in 1890. In 1895, she established Clare Embroidery, which was run from her home. She was assisted in this endeavour by the O'Briens' children's nurse, a Scotswoman named Mina Keppie, which had the capacity to train up to 15 girls at a time. The business moved with the family to Ballyalla in 1898, and by 1910 they were training up to 27 girls at one time. Both ventures exhibited their work with arts and crafts exhibitions in Ireland, Britain, and America from the 1890s to the 1920s. Amongst these exhibitions were those of the Royal Dublin Society, the Arts and Crafts Society of Ireland, the world fairs in Chicago and St Louis in 1893 and 1904 respectively winning several awards. At Lady Arran's Windsor sale in 1900, both Queen Victoria and the princess of Wales purchased examples of their work.

== Later life ==
As well as her interest in the lace industry, O'Brien was also active in the development of health care in the County Clare area. She served as a member of the Women's National Health Association, and was involved in the foundation of a sanitorium at Ballyalla in 1912. She initiated the Ennis District Nursing Association, running the scheme for a number of years. During and after World War I, she aided ex-servicemen in County Clare through her work with the War Pensions Committee. In the early twentieth century in Ireland there was a decline in the lace industry, which led to the closure of the school in 1922. Clare Embroidery continued production until O'Brien's death on 8 July 1936 at Ballyalla.
