= Huxley family =

British family

The Huxley family is an English family; several of its members have excelled in science, medicine, arts and literature. The family also includes members who occupied senior positions in the public service of the United Kingdom.

The patriarch of the family was the zoologist and comparative anatomist Thomas Henry Huxley (1825–1895). His grandsons include:

- Aldous Huxley, author of Brave New World and The Doors of Perception;
- his brother Julian Huxley, an evolutionary biologist and the first director of UNESCO;
- the Nobel laureate physiologist Andrew Huxley.

His grand-daughter-in-law (to his grandson Gervas Huxley) was Elspeth Huxley née Grant, the English polymath, author of The Flame Trees of Thika and The Mottled Lizard.

== Family tree ==
Huxley family tree

George Huxley
Thomas Henry Huxley; 1825–1895	Henrietta Anne Heathorn; 1825–1915
Julia Arnold; 1862–1908	Leonard Huxley; 1860–1933	Rosalind Bruce; 1890–1994	Jessie Huxley; 1858–1927	Henry Huxley; 1865–1946	Marian Huxley; 1859–1887	John Collier; 1850–1934	Ethel Huxley; 1866–1941
Juliette Huxley; 1896–1994	Julian Huxley; 1887–1975	Aldous Huxley; 1894–1963	David Bruce Huxley; 1915–1992	Andrew Huxley; 1917–2012	Richenda Pease; 1925–2003	Oriana Huxley Waller	Gervas Huxley; 1894–1971	Elspeth Grant; 1907–1997	Laurence Collier; 1890–1976
Anthony Huxley; 1920–1992	Francis Huxley; 1923–2016	Matthew Huxley; 1920–2005	Angela Huxley	George Pember Darwin; 1928–2001	Renée Haynes; 1906–1994	Jerrard Tickell; 1905–1966
Crispin Tickell; 1930–2022

== Thomas Henry Huxley ==
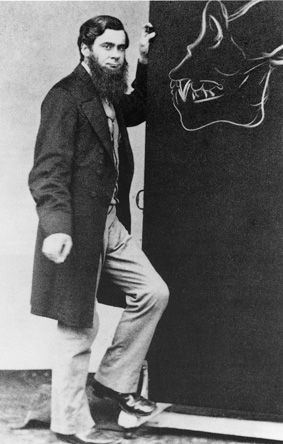
Thomas Henry Huxley with sketch of gorilla skull (c.1870)

Thomas Henry Huxley (1825–1895) was an English biologist known as "Darwin's Bulldog" for his defence of Charles Darwin's theory of evolution. Entirely an autodidact, he had an extraordinary influence on the British educated public. He was instrumental in developing scientific education in Britain, and opposed those Christian leaders who tried to stifle scientific debate. He was a member of eight Royal Commissions and two other commissions. A noted unbeliever, he used the term "agnostic" to describe his attitude to theism.

Though Huxley was a great comparative anatomist and invertebrate zoologist, perhaps his most notable scientific achievement was his work on human evolution. Starting in 1858, Huxley gave lectures and published papers which analysed the zoological position of man. The best were collected in a landmark work: Evidence as to Man's Place in Nature (1863). This contained two themes: first, humans are related to the great apes, and second, the species has evolved in a similar manner to all other forms of life. These were ideas which the careful and cautious Darwin had only hinted at in The Origin of Species, but with which Huxley was in full agreement.

In 1855, he married Henrietta Anne Heathorn (1825–1915), an English émigrée whom he had met in Sydney. They had five daughters and three sons:

- Noel Huxley (1856–1860), died aged four.
- Jessie Oriana Huxley (1858–1927), married architect Fred Waller in 1877.
- Marian Huxley (1859–1887) married artist John Collier in 1879.
- Leonard Huxley (1860–1933), married Julia Arnold.
- Rachel Huxley (1862–1934) married civil engineer Alfred Eckersley in 1884.

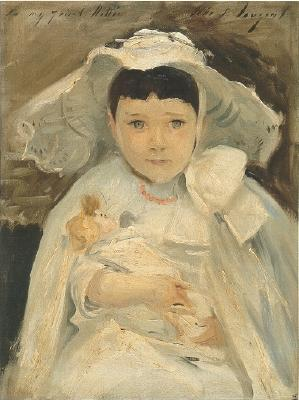
Portrait of Marion Roller (or Madge or Marian), Nettie and Harold's daughter (John Singer Sargent, 1893)

- Henrietta (Nettie) Huxley (1863–1940), married Harold Roller, travelled Europe as a singer.
- Henry Huxley (1865–1946), became a fashionable general practitioner in London.
- Ethel Huxley (1866–1941) married artist John Collier (widower of sister) in 1889.

=== John Collier (son-in-law) ===
Portrait of John Collier by his first wife Marian (née Huxley), c.1882

John Collier was not a Huxley by birth, but by marriage twice over: both his wives were daughters of Thomas Henry Huxley. The Honourable John Maler Collier OBE RP ROI (27 January 1850 – 11 April 1934) was a writer and painter in the Pre-Raphaelite style. He was one of the leading portrait painters of his generation. The National Portrait Gallery's collection of his portraiture is weak, but in 2007 it bought his first wife's portrait of him painting her.

Collier's views on religion and ethics are interesting for their comparison with the views of Thomas Henry Huxley and Julian Huxley, both of whom gave Romanes lectures on that subject. In The religion of an artist (1926) Collier explains "It [the book] is mostly concerned with ethics apart from religion... I am looking forward to a time when ethics will have taken the place of religion... My religion is really negative. [The benefits of religion] can be attained by other means which are less conducive to strife and which put less strain upon the reasoning faculties". On secular morality: "My standard is frankly utilitarian. As far as morality is intuitive, I think it may be reduced to an inherent impulse of kindliness towards our fellow citizens". On the idea of God: "People may claim without much exaggeration that the belief in God is universal. They omit to add that superstition, often of the most degraded kind, is just as universal". And "An omnipotent Deity who sentences even the vilest of his creatures to eternal torture is infinitely more cruel than the cruellest man". And on the Church: "To me, as to most Englishmen, the triumph of Roman Catholicism would mean an unspeakable disaster to the cause of civilization". His views, then, were very close to the agnosticism of Thomas Henry Huxley and the humanism of Julian Huxley.

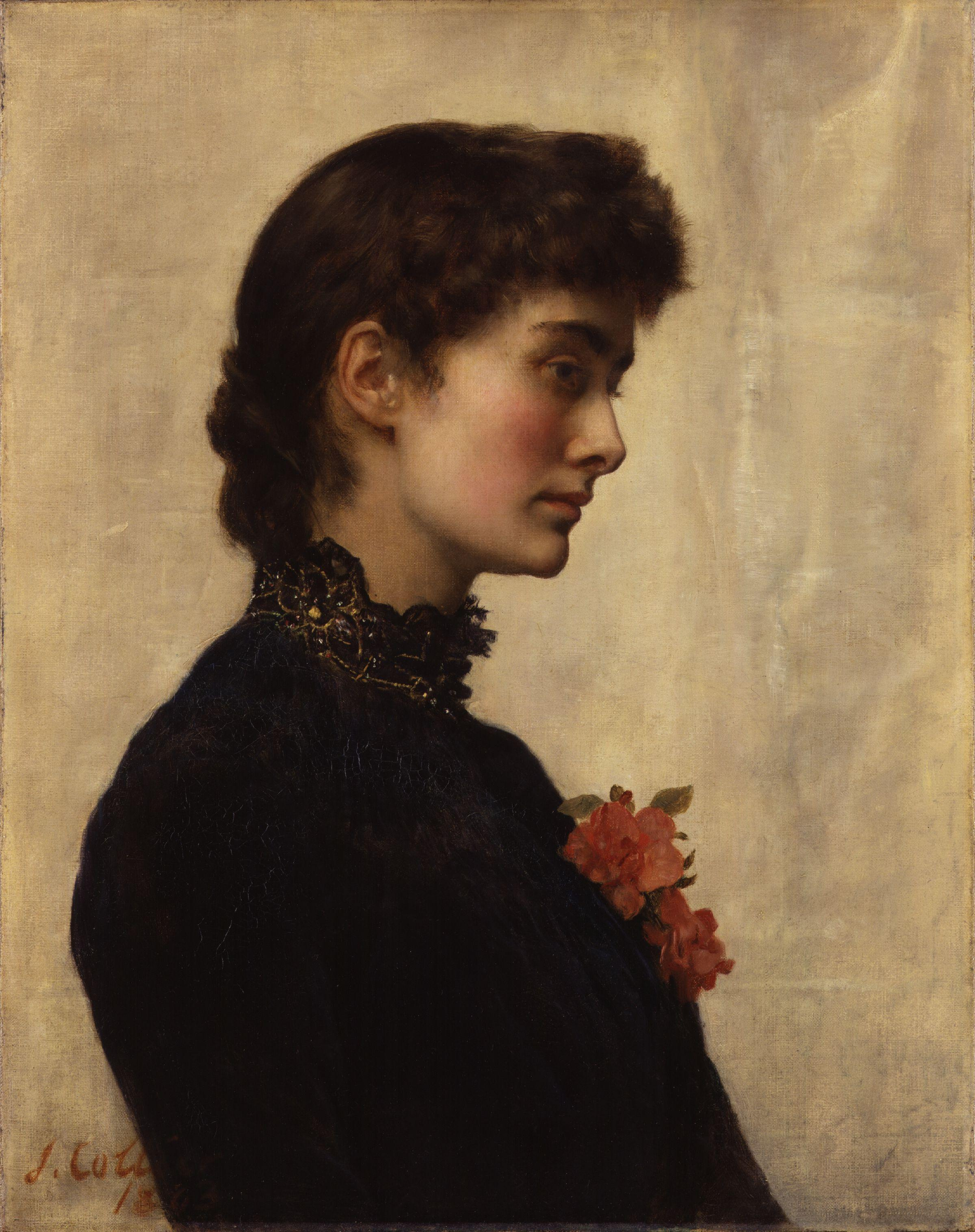
Portrait of Marian Huxley by John Collier, 1883

Collier and his first wife Marian (Mady) had one child, Joyce, a portrait miniaturist. She married twice, first to Leslie Crawshay-Williams, whose family were South Wales ironmasters. They had two children, Rupert Crawshay-Williams and Gillian. Joyce next married Drysdale Kilburn; they had a son, Nicholas Kilburn.

By his second wife Ethel he had a daughter and a son, Sir Laurence Collier KCMG, (1890–1976), British Ambassador to Norway 1939–1950. In later life Ethel became known as The Dragon, and then The Grand-Dragon to her grandchildren. She vetted all the family marriages; inspecting Elizabeth Powell for prospective marriage to Rupert Crawshay-Williams (her stepdaughter's son) she said "You are marrying into one of the great atheist families; I know you are an atheist now, but will you be able to keep it up until you die?". The bridegroom started working for Gramophone Records, but became a philosopher and writer. He was the author of The Comforts of Unreason (1947); Methods and Criteria of Reasoning (1957) and Russell Remembered (1970); a homage to Bertrand Russell.

Ethel's daughter Joan married Captain (later General) Frank Anstie Buzzard. They had three children: John Huxley Buzzard, Richard Buzzard, and Pamela.

==== Collier's portraits of the family and others ====
Collier painted numerous portraits of members of the family. He painted both his wives, Marian (Mady) and Ethel; his children; both Thomas Henry Huxley and his wife; and many of the next two generations. A biographer reports a total of thirty-two Huxley family portraits during the half-century after his marriage to Mady. His favourite sitter was his eldest daughter Joyce, of whom six portraits are recorded. Second wife Ethel sat for four portraits; their children, Joan and Laurence, the Buzzard children, Laurence's wife Eleanor, and several of their children were also portrayed. Many of Huxley's children and some of his grandchildren were portrayed: Leonard Huxley, Julian and Juliette Huxley, Aldous Huxley; Henry (Harry) Huxley and his wife, and son Gervas; Henrietta (Nettie) Huxley; and there are others.

Many scientific friends and supporters of Huxley sat for Collier. Darwin and Huxley themselves, twice each – and there were a number of replica portraits of Darwin and Huxley made by Collier. George John Romanes, William Kingdom Clifford, Sir Joseph Dalton Hooker, William Spottiswoode, Sir John Lubbock, E. Ray Lankester and Sir Michael Foster were all important friends. Francis Balfour and John Tyndall were portrayed after their tragic deaths.

=== Margaret Huxley (niece) ===
Margaret Huxley (1854–1940) was the niece of Thomas Henry Huxley, daughter of his brother William Thomas Huxley. She became a senior nurse in Dublin and is considered to be the pioneer of scientific nursing training in Ireland, after establishing nursing education in her own hospital and a few years later in a central school. She campaigned for the professionalisation of nursing and a formal system of nurse registration.

=== Sir Leonard George Holden Huxley (distant cousin) ===
Sir Leonard George Holden Huxley KBE (1902–1988) was second cousin once removed of Thomas Henry Huxley. Much of his life was spent in Australia, though he was at Oxford from 1923 to 1930. He obtained his D.Phil from Oxford University in 1928. The final period of his life was spent in Australia, University of Adelaide (1949–60); Australian National University (1960–67), latterly as Vice-Chancellor. A key figure in the establishment of the Anglo-Australian Telescope.

== Leonard Huxley and issue ==
Leonard Huxley (1860–1933), the most prominent of T. H. Huxley's children, had six children, several of whom left their mark on the twentieth century. He was a teacher (assistant master) at Charterhouse, then assistant editor and later editor of the Cornhill Magazine. Huxley's major biographies were the three volumes of Life and Letters of Thomas Henry Huxley and the two volumes of Life and Letters of Sir Joseph Dalton Hooker OM GCSI.

His first wife was Julia Arnold (1862–1908), founder in 1902 of Prior's Field School a still existing girls' school in Godalming, Surrey. Through her Leonard was connected to the intellectual family of the Arnolds: his wife's father was Tom Arnold (1823–1900), who married Julia Sorell, granddaughter of a former governor of Tasmania. Julia Arnold's sister was the best-selling novelist Mary (who wrote as Mrs Humphry Ward), her uncle the poet Matthew Arnold, and her grandfather the influential Rugby School headmaster Thomas Arnold. In her youth she and her sister Ethel had inspired Charles Dodgson (a.k.a. Lewis Carroll) to invent Doublets (now called word ladder).

Leonard and Julia had four children, including the biologist Sir Julian Sorell Huxley and the writer Aldous Leonard Huxley. Their middle son, Noel Trevenen (born in 1889) committed suicide in 1914. Their daughter, Margaret Arnold Huxley, was born in 1899. She studied at Somerville College, Oxford and died on 11 October 1981.

After the death of his first wife, Leonard married Rosalind Bruce (1890–1994), and had two further sons. The elder of these was David Bruce Huxley (1915–1992), whose daughter Angela Huxley married George Pember Darwin, son of the physicist Sir Charles Galton Darwin (and thus a great-grandson of Charles Darwin married a great-granddaughter of Thomas Huxley). The younger son (1917–2012) was the Nobel Prize winner, physiologist Andrew Fielding Huxley.

A Plaque was erected in 1995 at the house in Bracknell Gardens, Hampstead to commemorate Leonard, Julian and Aldous 'Men of Science and Letters, lived here.' Leonard and his two wives and sons (Aldous and Julian) have their ashes buried in Watts Cemetery in Compton near the site of their Priorsfield home.

=== Sir Julian Huxley ===
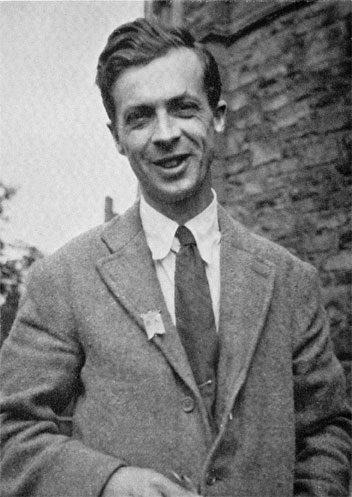
Julian Huxley when Fellow of New College, Oxford 1922.

Julian Huxley (1887–1975) was the first Director-General of UNESCO. He was Secretary of Zoological Society, co-founder of the World Wildlife Fund, and president of the British Eugenics Society. He won the Darwin Medal of the Royal Society, the Darwin–Wallace Medal of the Linnaean Society, the Kalinga Prize and the Lasker Award. He presided over the founding conference for the International Humanist and Ethical Union. He wrote fifty books, including "The Science of Life", co-authored with H. G. Wells and Wells's son, G. P. Wells.

Julian was important as a proponent of natural selection at a time when Darwin's idea was denigrated by many. His master-work Evolution: The Modern Synthesis gave the name to a mid-century movement which united biological theory and overcame problems caused by over-specialisation.

Julian married Juliette Baillot in 1919. They had two children, and both became scientists: Anthony Julian Huxley, a botanist and horticulturalist, and Francis Huxley, an anthropologist.

A Wetherspoon Public house in Selsdon was named after him.

==== Francis Huxley ====
Francis Huxley (1923 – 2016) was the son of Julian and Juliette Huxley. He was a British zoologist, anthropologist and author and is best known for his anthropological expeditions to The Gambia, the Amazon, and Haiti, among other places, about which he wrote several notable books.

=== Aldous Huxley ===
Aldous Huxley (1894–1963) was a novelist and philosopher. His styles were iconoclasm; disenchanted social commentary and a dystopic view of the future were repeated themes. He was regarded in California, where he spent the latter part of his life, as a considerable intellectual guru. His main works include Crome Yellow (1921), Antic Hay (1923), Brave New World (1932) (which began as a parody of Men Like Gods by H. G. Wells), Eyeless in Gaza (1936) and Island (1960). Island, his last novel, is set in a utopia, in profound contrast to the dystopian Brave New World. The central theme is the development of a society which unites the best of western and eastern culture. It contains, amongst more serious ideas, the humorous notion of parrots who utter uplifting slogans. Huxley also wrote many essays, including The Doors of Perception which he wrote while experimenting with mescaline. Its title was taken from a poem by William Blake, and in turn inspired the name of the band The Doors.

Aldous married twice, to Maria Nys (1919), and after her death, to Laura Archera (1956). Laura felt inspired to illuminate the story of their provocative marriage through Mary Ann Braubach's 2010 documentary, "Huxley on Huxley". His only child, Matthew Huxley (1920 – 10 February 2005, age 84) was also an author, as well as an educator, anthropologist and prominent epidemiologist. His work ranged from promoting universal health care to establishing standards of care for nursing home patients and the mentally ill to investigating the question of what is a socially sanctionable drug. Matthew's first marriage, to documentary filmmaker Ellen Hovde, ended in divorce. His second wife died in 1983. He was survived by his third wife, Franziska Reed Huxley; and two children from his first marriage, Trevenen Huxley and Tessa Huxley.

=== David Bruce Huxley ===
Financier and lawyer (1915–1992). He served in World War II in Africa and Iraq reaching the rank of brigade major in the British Army. He became the youngest Queen's Counsel (QC) in the British Empire. In Bermuda in the 1940s and 1950s he was Solicitor General, Attorney General, and acting Chief Justice of the Supreme Court. He compiled and revised many of the laws of Bermuda. He married twice and had five children by his first wife, Anne Remsen Schenck. His daughter Angela Mary Bruce Huxley (born 1939) married George Pember Darwin in 1964, and his son Michael Remsen Huxley (1940–2021) became curator of science at the Smithsonian Institution. In retirement, David and his second wife, Ouida (who was raised by her aunt Ouida Rathbone, married to the actor Basil Rathbone) lived in Wansford-in-England, Cambridgeshire, where he served as churchwarden.

=== Andrew Huxley ===
Andrew Huxley (1917–2012), the last child of Leonard Huxley, was awarded the Nobel Prize in Physiology or Medicine for studies of the central nervous system, especially the activity of nerve fibres. He was knighted in 1974 and appointed to the Order of Merit in 1983. He was the second Huxley to be President of the Royal Society, the first being his grandfather, T. H. H.

In 1947 he married Jocelyn Richenda Gammell Pease (1925–2003), the daughter of the geneticist Michael Pease and his wife Helen Bowen Wedgwood, the daughter of Josiah Wedgwood IV. They had one son and five daughters.

== Jessie Oriana Huxley (1858–1927) and issue ==
Jessie, the eldest daughter of T. H. Huxley, survived scarlet fever when two years old, a disease which had killed her brother Noel. She grew up to marry Frederick Waller, who became architect to the Dean and Chapter of Gloucester Cathedral and unofficial architect-in-chief to the Huxley family.

Jessie and Fred had a son, Noel Huxley Waller, and a daughter, Oriana Huxley Waller. Noel won the Military Cross in the Gloucestershire Regiment in World War I, later becoming Colonel of the 5th Gloucesters, a territorial battalion of the regiment. He succeeded his father as architect to Gloucester Cathedral, and had five children from two marriages. He married, first, Helen Durrant, with Anthony, Audrey, Oriana and Letitia as children. Then he married Marion Taylor, with daughters Marion and Priscilla.

Oriana married E. S. P. Haynes, an Eton and Balliol scholar who became a dedicated divorce law reformer. They had three daughters, Renée, Celia and Elvira. Renée Haynes, a successful novelist, married Jerrard Tickell, an Irish writer. They had three sons, one of whom, Crispin, became a distinguished civil servant. The daughter of another son, Patrick, is Dame Clare Tickell, Chief Executive of Action for Children. Clare Tickell's brother, Adam, was Pro Vice Chancellor at the University of Birmingham, which grew out of Mason Science College which Thomas Huxley formally opened in 1880. Professor Adam Tickell is now Vice Chancellor at the University of Sussex.

=== Sir Crispin Tickell ===
Sir Crispin Tickell GCMG KCVO (25 August 1930 – 25 January 2022) was a British diplomat, academic and environmentalist. He was the great-grandson of Jessica Huxley. He was Chef de Cabinet to the President of the European Commission (1977–1980), British Ambassador to Mexico (1981–1983), Permanent Secretary of the [Overseas Development Administration] (now Department for International Development) (1984–1987), and British Ambassador to the United Nations and Permanent Representative on the UN Security Council (1987–1990).

Tickell was Warden of Green College, Oxford, between 1990 and 1997 and was director of the Policy Foresight Programme of the James Martin Institute for Science and Civilization at the University of Oxford. He was the recipient, between 1990 and 2006, of 23 honorary doctorates.

He was the president of the UK charity Tree Aid, which enables communities in Africa's drylands to fight poverty and become self-reliant, while improving the environment. He had many interests, including climate change, population issues, conservation of biodiversity and the early history of the Earth.

His son, Oliver Tickell, is a journalist, author and campaigner on environmental issues.

== Rachel Huxley (1862–1934) and issue ==
Rachel Huxley, the fifth of T. H. Huxley's children, married civil engineer Alfred Eckersley in 1884, who built railways in various parts of the world. Their eldest son, Roger Huxley Eckersley, was born in Algeria; their second, Thomas Lydwell Eckersley, was born the next year. The family moved to Mexico, and their third son, Peter Eckersley, was born there. All three children married and had issue.

Rachel married, secondly, Harold Shawcross, and they had two children, Betty and Anthony Shawcross. Anthony married Mary Donaldson, and they had three children, Elizabeth, Simon and David.

== Henry Huxley (1865–1946) and issue ==
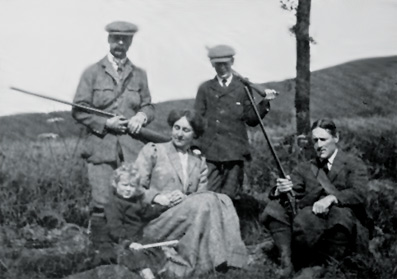
A shooting party in Scotland, 1907. (Back row: Henry Huxley; Gervas Huxley. Front row: Anne Huxley; Netty Huxley; Dighton Pollock.)

Henry Huxley, the youngest son and penultimate child of T. H. Huxley, trained in medicine at St Bartholomew's Hospital, London. He married Sophy Stobart, a nurse. As she was the daughter of a considerable landowning and churchgoing family in Yorkshire, who were somewhat nervous of a connection with the son of a famous infidel, family meetings were held to smooth feelings and avoid difficulties. After the marriage the couple were set up in London, with a medical practice for Henry.

The couple had five children: Marjorie (m. Sir E. J. Harding), Gervas (m. Elspeth), Michael (m. Ottille de Lotbinière Mills, 3c.), Christopher (m. Edmée Ritchie, 3c.) and Anne (m. Geoffrey Cooke, 3c.).

=== Gervas Huxley (1894–1971) ===
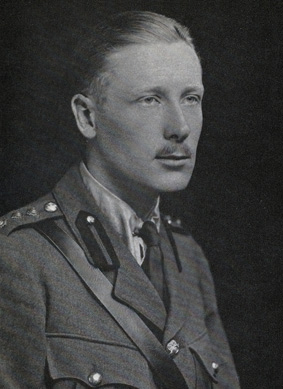
Captain Gervas Huxley MC, 1917

The eldest son of Henry Huxley, Gervas served in the British Army from 1914, becoming battalion bombing officer. He received the Military Cross on the first day of Passchendaele for capturing prisoners whose presence showed the arrival of a fresh German Guards Division. He was demobilised in 1919.

Gervas was recruited in 1939 to help set up the wartime Ministry of Information. After the war he sat on the executive committee of the British Council, and became a successful author of biographies, especially on the Grosvenor family. He also penned a 1956 homage to tea, entitled "Talking of Tea". He died at Chippenham in 1971.

Gervas's second marriage was to Elspeth Grant (1907–1997) in 1931; she had grown up in Kenya and was a friend of Joy Adamson. After the marriage she wrote White Man's Country: Lord Delamere and the Making of Kenya. Her life and work are the subject of a 2002 biography. As an author, Elspeth Huxley was well up to Huxley standards, and one of the few wives who was better-known than her husband. The Flame Trees of Thika (1959) was perhaps the most celebrated of her thirty books; it was later adapted for television. They had one son, Charles (1944–2015).

== Huxley Family Foundation ==
The Huxley Family Foundation was created by Laura Archera in 2007 to continue the work of deceased Huxley Family members and associates, as well as to work in association with the Thomas Henry Huxley X Club. Cofounders include Laura and Aldous Huxley's nephew Piero Ferrucci, his two sons, Jonathan and Emilio, and Paul Fleiss.

== See also ==
- Darwin–Wedgwood family
- Intellectualism
- Evidence as to Man's Place in Nature
