= Ethel Arnold =

English journalist and suffrage lecturer

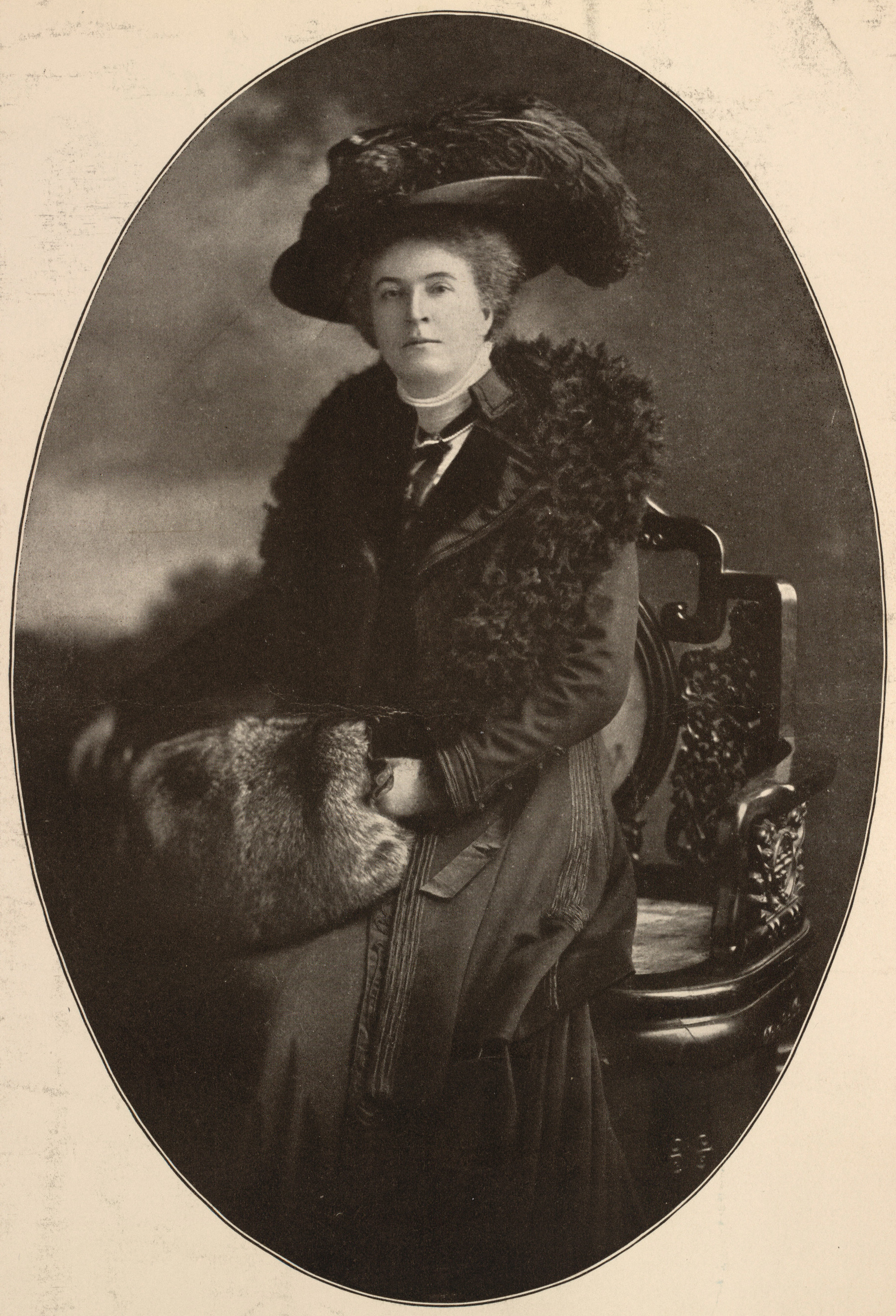
- Advert for her 1910 US lecture tour
- Born: 1865; Harborne, Staffordshire, England
- Died: 5 October 1930 (aged 65); Totland, Isle of Wight
- Occupations: Writer, photographer, lecturer
- Father: Tom Arnold
- Relatives: William Thomas Arnold (brother); Julia Huxley (sister); Mary Augusta Ward (sister); Matthew Arnold (uncle); Thomas Arnold (grandfather)

Ethel Margaret Arnold (bapt. 26 May 1865 – 5 October 1930) was an English journalist, author, and lecturer on female suffrage.

== Life ==
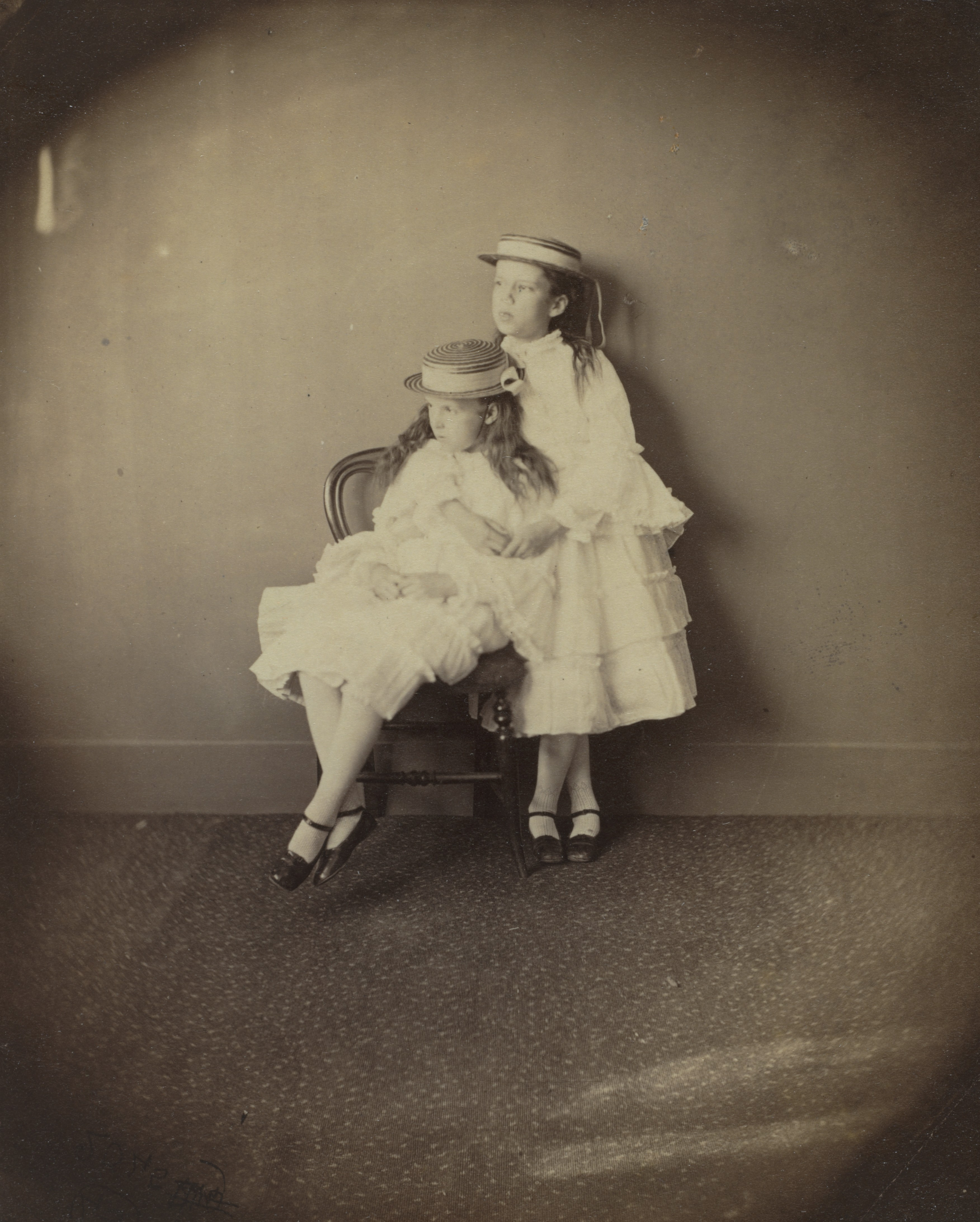
Julia and Ethel Arnold in 1872 by Lewis Carroll

Arnold was born in 1865 in Harborne, Staffordshire, England. She was the youngest of eight surviving children of Tom Arnold, a professor of literature, and Julia Sorrell. Her uncle was the poet Matthew Arnold and her grandfather Thomas Arnold, the headmaster of Rugby School. One of her sisters became the novelist Mary Augusta Ward. Another sister, Julia, married Leonard Huxley, and their sons were Julian Huxley and Aldous Huxley. The Arnolds and the Huxleys were important members of British intelligentsia.

Arnold's father had returned to Australia after converting to Catholicism and finding it impossible to work. He worked in Ireland but by 1865 he had renounced Catholicism and returned to being an Anglican. This was a great relief to his wife and the family moved to Oxford where her father thrived.

Arnold met Lewis Carroll as a child and she and her sister featured in a number of his photographs. For Christmas in 1877, Lewis Carroll devised the word ladder game of Doublets for Julia and Ethel. The game was later published by Vanity Fair and by Carroll. Ethel later reported that she enjoyed the attention of having her photo taken as it was a break from her less than happy homelife. Arnold was to remain friends with Lewis Carroll when she was still an adult.

Arnold failed to gain a university place and she seems to have placed too much weight on her sister Mary's opinion. Mary persuaded her that her ambition to be an actress should not be pursued and she later said that Ethel had insufficient experience to be a successful writer. This was despite Ethel already having a commission for a novel.

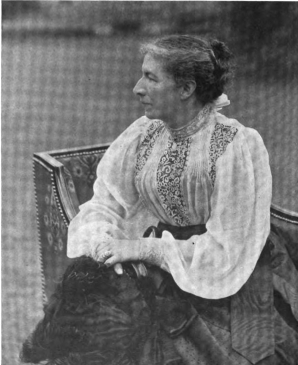
Her sister Mary August Ward by Arnold in 1898

Arnold took a late interest in writing between 1890 and 1900 but she spent a lot of her energy in speaking tours where she would address the issue of gaining women the vote. She wrote 400 book reviews for British newspapers and her one novel Platonics was said to be "promising" when it was published in 1896. The novel included a lesbian attraction which is resolved when one of the characters is attracted to a man. Arnold moved on from writing to take an interest in photography. She studied at the Regent Street Polytechnic in 1898 and obtained skilful results.

In 1909 Arnold started a lecture tour of the United States. She spoke at Carnegie Hall filling the orchestra pit and her talks were well received. She returned in 1910 offering a wide range of talks on her notable ancestors and child humourists like Lewis Carroll. She spoke in St. Louis on April 11 at the invitation of Amabel Anderson Arnold and others. The St Louis Equal Suffrage League cited her talk as the inspiration for the organisation's formation.

Arnold died in Totland on the Isle of Wight in 1930, aged 65.

Arnold family tree (partial)

Thomas Arnold; 1795–1842	Mary Penrose; 1791–1873
Matthew Arnold; 1822–1888	Tom Arnold; 1823–1900	Julia Sorell; 1826–1888	William Delafield Arnold; 1828–1859	Jane Martha Arnold; 1821–1899	William Edward Forster; 1818–1886
Ethel Arnold; 186?-1930	Mary Augusta Ward; 1851–1920	Julia Arnold; 1862–1908	Leonard Huxley; 1860–1933	H. O. Arnold-Forster; 1855–1909	Lucy Story-Maskelyne; 1861–1951
Julian Huxley; 1887–1975	Aldous Huxley; 1894–1963	William Arnold-Forster; 1886–1951	Katherine Laird Cox; 1887–1938
Matthew Huxley; 1920-2005	Mark Arnold-Forster; 1920–1981

Key
	descent	adoption
	marriage
