= Leonard Huxley =

Leonard Huxley may refer to:

- Leonard Huxley (writer) (1860–1933), British writer and editor and member of the famous Huxley family
- Leonard Huxley (physicist) (1902–1988), Australian physicist, and also a peripheral member of the Huxley family
