= William Sorell =

British army officer and colonial administrator (1775–1848)

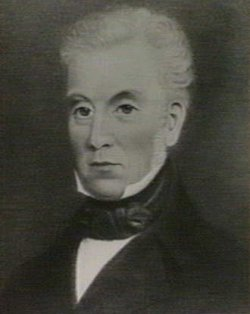

3rd Lieutenant Governor of Van Diemen's Land
- In office 9 March 1817 – 14 May 1824
- Preceded by: Thomas Davey
- Succeeded by: George Arthur

Personal details
- Born: 1775 West Indies
- Died: 4 June 1848 (aged 72–73) Marylebone, London, England
- Spouse: Louisa Matilda Cox
- Relations: Mary Augusta Ward (great-granddaughter); William Thomas Arnold (great-grandson); Julia Huxley (great-granddaughter); Ethel Arnold (great-granddaughter); Julian Huxley (great-great-grandson); Aldous Huxley (great-great-grandson)

William Sorell (1775 – 4 June 1848) was a soldier and third Lieutenant-Governor of Van Diemen's Land.

Sorell was born probably in the West Indies, the eldest son of Lieutenant-general William Alexander Sorell and his wife Jane.

== Van Diemen's Land ==
William Sorell took over from Thomas Davey on 9 April 1817 with the colony in disarray. He reported that the island was in a 'long disordered state from a Banditti which has subsisted for years'. Punishment for serious offences were difficult due to the vast distances the convict and settler would have to cover in order to get to the court of criminal judicature in Hobart. The police force was also inept, due to it being made up of convicts as the rate of pay it provided was too low for the service of respectable people.

In his 7 years as lieutenant-governor, Sorell did a good job at cleaning up the colony. It was under Sorell that Michael Howe's bushranger-gang was broken with most of its members hanged, returning order to much of the island including the upper Derwent and Clyde river area which contained the colonies richest farmland. Sorell systemised land grants and cleaned up the woeful bookkeeping he had inherited from Davey, reducing corruption and under the table deals between government officials and the settlers.

The masterpiece that Sorell would always be known for, however, was the foundation of the Macquarie Harbour Penal Settlement in 1821, a place he referred to as for 'ultra banishment and punishment' for convicts whom were in danger of becoming bushrangers and had committed secondary crimes in the colony. The settlement became a benchmark of punishment in the British Empire, playing a key role in keeping the convicts of Van Diemen's Land submissive, even though the convict population had risen from 18% of the white population in 1817 at the start of Sorell's term to 58% of the white population in 1822, just before he was recalled. Mount Sorell and Cape Sorell which tower over and surround Macquarie Harbour and its penal colony are named after him.

Sorell was recalled from hs role as Lieutenant-governor on 26 August 1823. His successor, Lieutenant-governor George Arthur, arrived on 12 May 1824; Sorell left for England on 12 June 1824. Sorell junior's daughter, Julia, married Tom Arnold and became the mother of the novelist Mary Augusta Ward, the author Ethel Arnold, the scholar Julia Huxley (herself the mother of Julian Huxley and Aldous Huxley) and the journalist and writer William Thomas Arnold.

Preceded by Thomas Davey	Lieutenant Governor of Van Diemen's Land; 1817–1824	Succeeded by George Arthur
