= Hot milk cake =

American sponge cake

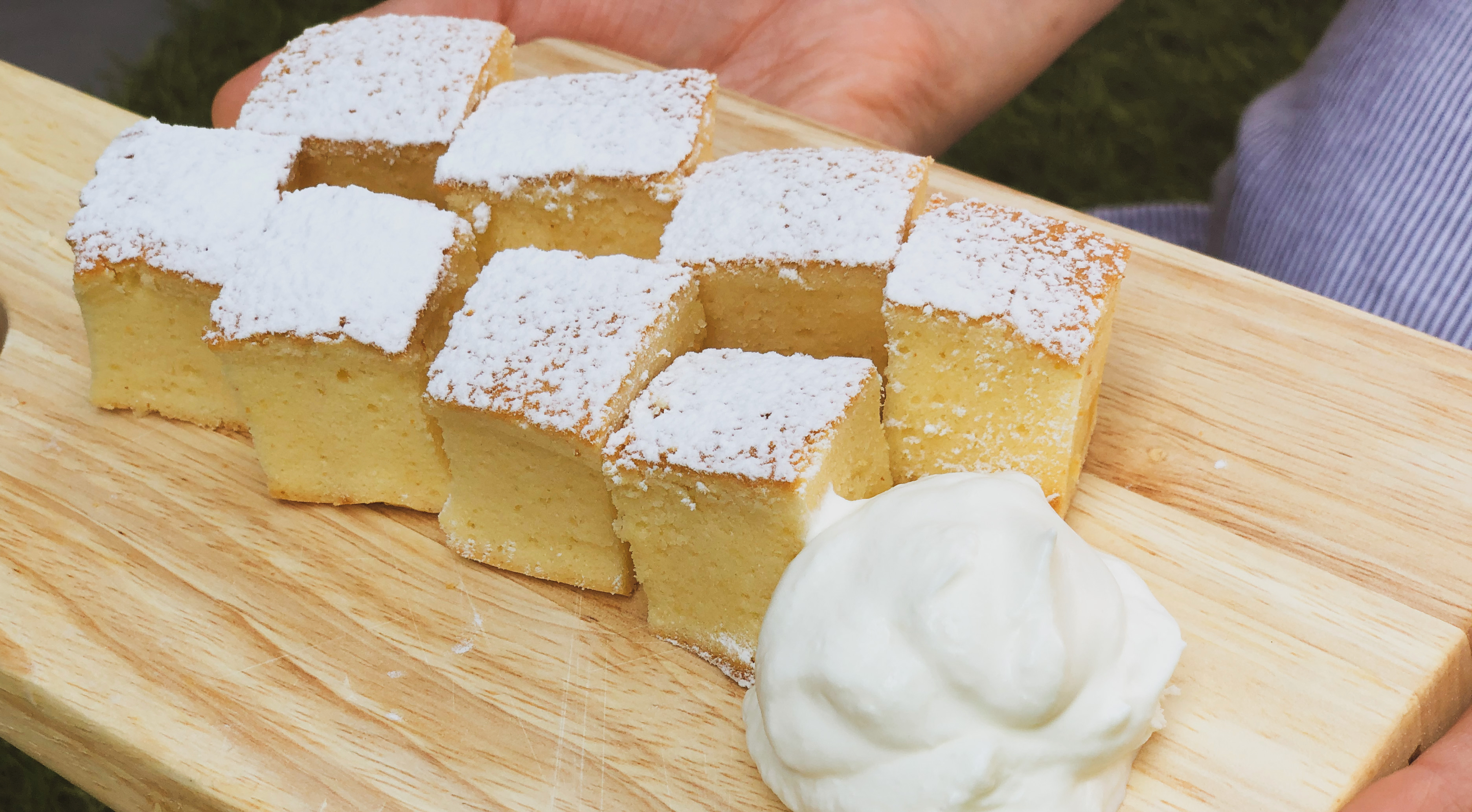
- Type: Sponge cake, Butter cake
- Course: Dessert
- Place of origin: United States
- Main ingredients: Flour, butter, milk, baking powder, sugar, eggs
- Variations: Chocolate, nuts, coconut

Hot milk cake is a butter sponge cake from American cuisine. It can be made as a sheet cake or a layer cake, or baked in a tube pan. The hot milk and butter give the cake a distinctive fine-grained texture, similar to pound cake.

Hot milk cake gets its distinctive flavor from the scalded milk that is the liquid component of the batter. It differs from traditional sponge cakes, such as angel food cake or genoise, in that it contains baking powder as leavening instead of just egg whites, so it can be made with butter like a Victoria sponge. The eggs are beaten together whole instead of whipped as yolks and whites separately.

== Preparation ==
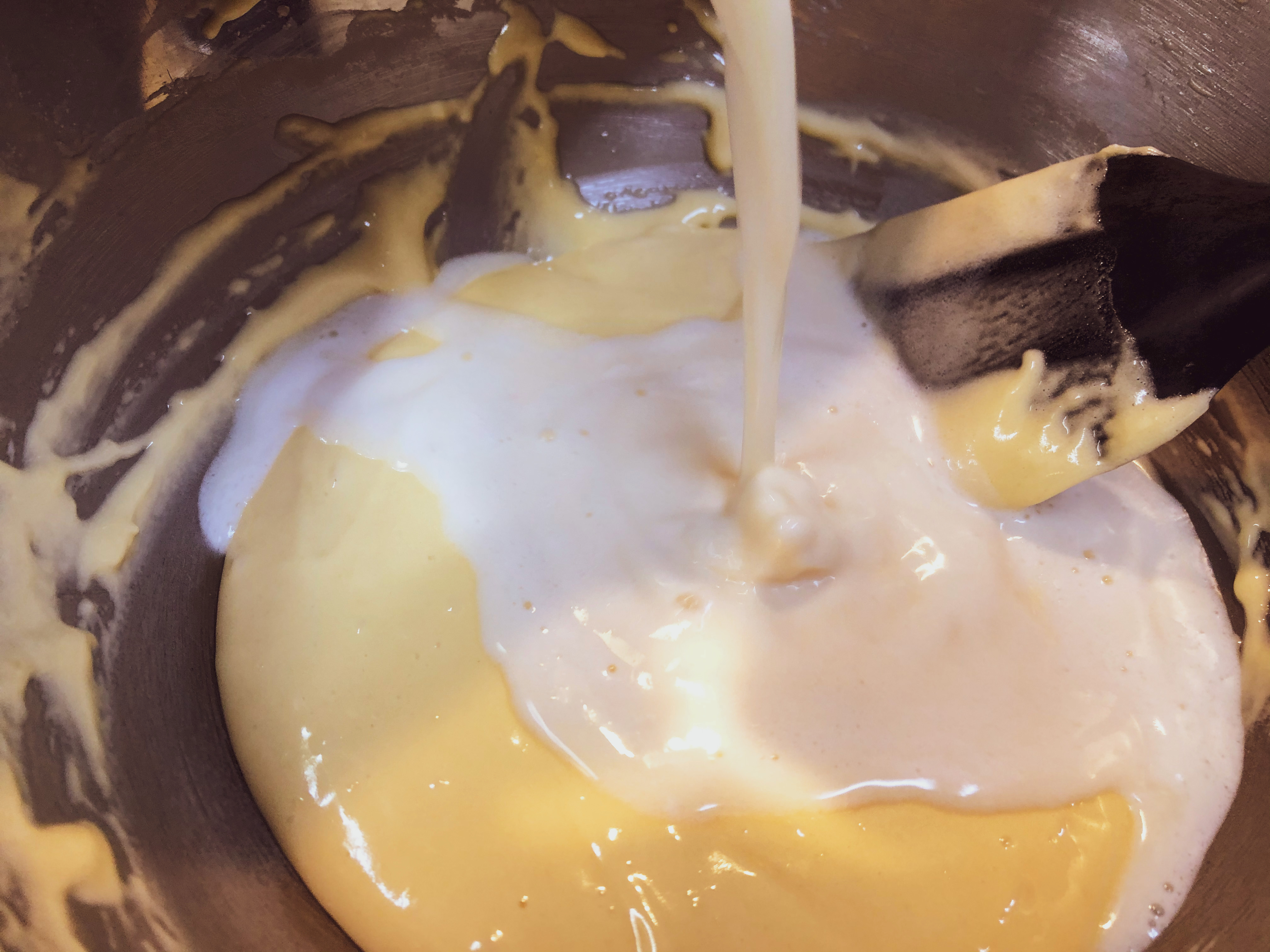
Hot milk cake batter being prepared

Eggs are creamed with sugar, then flour is added. The milk is heated with butter until the butter has melted. This hot milk–butter mixture is poured into the batter all at once, and the batter is mixed until it cools. The heat begins cooking the eggs while the cake it being mixed.

Baking powder is added at the last stage before the cake is baked. This method gives the cake a fine-grained texture that is more similar to pound cake than traditional egg-leavened sponge cakes.

The milk in the cake can be reconstituted from powdered milk. Making it requires less effort and skill than a chiffon cake.

== History ==
A simple recipe from 1911 is made with sugar, eggs, flour, salt, baking powder and hot milk, with optional ingredients of chocolate, nuts or coconut. Compared to a typical butter cake, a hot milk cake uses fewer expensive ingredients, so it became popular during the Great Depression and among people coping with the restrictions of rationing during World War II.

A recipe from Ruth Ellen Church, a former food editor for the Chicago Tribune (who sometimes wrote under the pen name Mary Meade) was published in 1955. It has mocha-flavored icing, and is moist and delicate.

Hot milk cake has been served every year since 1991 at the Anne Arundel County Historical Society's annual Strawberry Festival at Thurgood Marshall International Airport.

== See also ==
- List of cakes
- List of regional dishes of the United States
