= George Leonard Huxley =

British–Irish classicist (1932–2022)

George Leonard Huxley MRIA
- Born: 23 September 1932; Leicester, England
- Died: 30 November 2022 (aged 90); Chipping Norton, England
- Citizenship: British and Irish
- Spouse: Davina Best (m. 1957; died 2020)
- Children: 3
- Parent(s): Leonard Huxley and Molly Huxley
- Relatives: Aldous Huxley (cousin)

Academic background
- Education: Magdalen College, Oxford

Academic work
- Discipline: Classical philology and archaeology

George Leonard Huxley (23 September 1932 – 30 November 2022) was a British–Irish classicist and archaeologist. He taught Greek at Queen's University Belfast from 1962 until 1983.

== Early life and education ==
George Leonard Huxley was born into the Huxley family in Leicester, England, on 23 September 1932. His parents were Australian physicist Leonard Huxley and historian Molly Huxley (née Copeland). He had one sister, Margot Huxley, who became a geographer and urban planner, and was distantly related to English writer and philosopher Aldous Huxley.

Huxley grew up in England, spending most of his childhood in Leicester where his father taught at University College, Leicester. He converted from Anglicanism to Catholicism when he was 21 years old.

Huxley studied classical philology at Magdalen College, Oxford, and graduated with a degree in literae humaniores in 1955. He was a fellow of the All Souls College, Oxford from 1955 until 1961.

== Career ==
Huxley became assistant director of the British School at Athens in 1956, and held the position for two academic years. He participated in archaelogical excavations in Greece, including Sinclair Hood's excavation at Knossos, and the 1961 excavation at Kythira. He also directed excavations at Kastri from 1962 through 1965. He met archaeologist Davina Best during an excavation in Crete and they married in 1957. They had three daughters: Harriet, Sophia, and Corinna.

Huxley played a major role in the growth of the field of classics in Ireland. He moved to Belfast with his family in 1962, and taught Greek at Queen's University Belfast from 1962 until 1983. He founded the biennial Hibernian Hellenists lecture series in 1963, and also helped to establish the Irish Institute of Hellenic Studies at Athens by securing funding and requesting support from Irish President Michael D. Higgins.

In 1971, Huxley was elected to the Royal Irish Academy. During the 1970s, Huxley was a member of the executive of the Northern Ireland Civil Rights Movement.

After 1983, Huxley lived in Church Enstone, Oxfordshire, and continued to spend significant amounts of time in Ireland. In 1984, he became senior vice-president of the Federation Internationale des Societes d'Etudes Classique and chaired the organising committee for the Eighth International Congress of Classical Studies in Dublin. He was director of the Gennadius Library at the American School of Classical Studies at Athens from 1986 until 1989.

In 1989, Huxley became honorary professor of classics at Trinity College Dublin. He later taught classics, mathematics and statistics at Maynooth University. He received honorary doctorate degrees from Queen's University, Trinity College Dublin, and Maynooth University. He was also briefly lecturer at Harvard University and University of California, San Diego.

Huxley was appointed honorary professor of the Classical Association of Ireland in 1999.

Over the course of Huxley's life, he authored hundreds of academic articles and several books. In 2008, he donated his papers to the American School of Classical Studies at Athens.

== Retirement and death ==
Huxley became a citizen of Ireland in 2018, saying that "I am very fond of Ireland and the Irish. I am devoted to Ireland." He also had a passionate interest in rail transport and rail history, and had a model railway in his garden.

Huxley's wife Davina died in December 2020 and was buried in St. Kenelm's Church, Oxfordshire. Huxley died on 30 November 2022 and was buried with her in St. Kenelm's. One of Huxley's friends gathered soil from Kythira, Greece, and placed it in his grave.

== Selected bibliography ==
- Homer and the Travellers (1988)
- On Aristotle and Greek Society (1979)
- Pindar's Vision of the Past (1975)
- Kythera: Excavations and Studies Conducted by the University of Pennsylvania Museum and the British School at Athens (1972)
- Greek Epic Poetry from Eumelos to Panyassis (1969)
- The Early Ionians (1966)
- Achaeans and the Hittites (1960)
