= Food column =

Newspaper column about food

A food column is a type of newspaper column dealing with food. It may be focused on recipes, health trends, or improving efficiency. It is generally geared towards gourmets or "foodies". Since 1994, food writers have also written columns and blogs on the web. Kate Heyhoe's Internet column first appeared on the electronic Gourmet Guide in December 1994 and became the centerpiece of its own website, The Global Gourmet, in 1996, making her one of the longest, continuously-running food blogger/columnists on the web.

== Food columnists in the English-speaking world ==
Some food columnists of note include:

- Julia Child
- Craig Claiborne
- John T. Edge
- Kate Heyhoe
- Judith Huxley
- Christopher Kimball
- Sheila Lukins
- Wolfgang Puck (Wolfgang Puck’s Kitchen)
- Sylvia Schur
- Ruth Ellen Church
- Rahen Sehan

== See also ==
- Culinary Arts
- Food porn
