= Judith Huxley =

American journalist and columnist (1926–1983)

- Born: Judith Wallet; 1926; Boston, Massachusetts, US
- Died: October 17, 1983 (aged 56); Chevy Chase, Maryland, US
- Education: Boston College; Hunter College
- Spouse(s): Roger Bordage (div.); Matthew Huxley (c. 1963)
- Writing career
- Genres: Food and gardening Politics
- Notable work: Table for Eight in The Washington Post

Judith Huxley (1926, Boston – October 17, 1983, Chevy Chase) was an American journalist and food columnist, best known for her biweekly column Table for Eight in The Washington Post.

== Biography ==
Huxley, born Judith Wallet, was born and raised in Boston. She had a brother, George, and studied at Boston College and Hunter College. She started her journalism career at Associated Press in Boston, later working for the Boston Globe, the Rockefeller Foundation, J. Walter Thompson, Food & Wine, The Washingtonian, and Smithsonian on economics, books, mental health, politics, food, and gardening. She lived in New York City, where she was a publicity writer for the Federation of Jewish Philanthropies Appeal. Her column Table for Eight ran every other Sunday for two years in the Washington Post and was collected into book form and published posthumously by William Morrow and Company.

In the 1940s, she was national fund chairman and later president of the Junior Mizrachi Women's Organization of America's Hanitah chapter in Brooklyn. During her life, she was also a member of the ACLU, the Cosmopolitan Club, and the Woman's National Democratic Club, as well as chairwoman of the Alliance Française de Washington's cooking program.

Huxley traveled widely for work with her first husband, Roger Bordage, including to Paris, India, and Bolivia, the last of which was for a United Nations mission. They later divorced. She then married Matthew Huxley and moved with him in 1963 to Washington, D.C. Journalist William Rice wrote in the introduction of the Table for Eight book that the Huxleys "conducted what, in another time, would have been called a salon." After 13 years of battling cancer, she died at her Chevy Chase home on October 17, 1983.

== Books ==
- Huxley, Judith (1984). Judith Huxley's Table for Eight: Recipes and menus for entertaining with the seasons. William Morrow and Company. ISBN 978-0688026394.
