= Emma Jane Guyton =

English novelist (1825–1887)

Emma Jane Guyton or Worboise (née Worboys; 1825–1887) was an English novelist, biographer and editor. Her more than 50 novels feature strong Christian values and were popular in their time.

== Life ==
Guyton was born Emma Jane Worboys in Birmingham on 20 April 1825 to George Baddeley Worboys (c. 1803–1867), a gunsmith, and his wife, Maria Lane (c. 1807–post 1887). Emma was a lifelong Congregationalist. She attended boarding school and may have worked as a governess.

Though Guyton described herself late in life as the widow of a Mr Etherington Guyton, a Baptist minister of French descent, no evidence for the existence of such a person has been found. She began to suffer from alcoholism, which brought about her death on 25 August 1887 at Clevedon, Somerset.

== Writings ==
Guyton's first book, published under the name Worboise, was the novel Alice Cunningham (1846). It was followed by about fifty other novels with a Christian message, which were very popular in their time. Thornycroft Hall (1864), Crystabel (1873) and A Woman's Patience (1879) are among titles to have been reissued in print-on-demand editions.

The theology that underlies Guyton's novels has attracted some critical attention. According to another recent scholar, "Worboise uses her novels to enter debates about the relation of religion to gender and to public life. Worboise's ideal is a wholehearted application of Christian values to all areas of life.... This holistic commitment to a religion of the heart, but also of action, in all areas of life underpins Worboise's challenge to the cultural division of sacred from secular, private from public, and feminine from masculine."

Guyton greatly admired Dr Thomas Arnold, the educational reformer and headmaster of Rugby School, whose life she published in 1859. She began to write for the newspaper Christian World in 1857. She edited the monthly Christian World Magazine and Family Visitor from 1866 to 1885, and many of her own novels were serialized there.

== Partial bibliography ==
Information from the British Library Main Catalogue and from a booksellers' catalogue.

- Alice Cunningham (1846)
- Autobiography of Maude Bolingbroke (as Emma Jane, 1849)
- Amy Wilton, or, Lights and Shades of Christian Life (1852)
- Grace Hamilton's School Days (c. 1856)
- Kingsdown Lodge, or, Lights and Shades of Christian Life (1858, possibly a reprint of Amy Wilton...)
- The Wife's Trials. A Tale (1858)
- The Life of Thomas Arnold, D.D. (1859)
- Millicent Kendrick, or, The Search after Happiness (1862)
- Married Life: or, The Story of Philip and Edith (1863)
- Lottie Lonsdale, or, The Chain and Its Links (1863)
- Thornycroft Hall: Its Owners and Its Heirs (1864)
- The Lillingstones of Lillingstone (1864)
- Labour and Wait, or Evelyn's Story 2 vols (1864–67)
- Sir Julian's Wife (1866)
- St. Beetha's; or, The Heiress of Arne (1866)
- Violet Vaughan; or, The Shadows of Warneford Grange (1866)
- Hymns and Songs for the Christian Church; and Poems (1867)
- Margaret Torrington; or, The Voyage of Life (1868)
- Singlehurst Manor, or, A Story of Country Life (1869)
- The Fortunes of Cyril Denham (1869)
- Overdale, or, The Story of a Pervert (1869)
- Mr. Montmorency's Money (1870)
- Grey and Gold (1870)
- Nobly Born (1871)
- Canonbury Holt: A Life's Problem Stated (1872)
- Crystabel, or, Clouds with Silver Linings (1873)
- Husbands and Wives (1873)
- The House of Bondage (1873)
- Our New House, or, Keeping Up Appearances (1873)
- Emilia's Inheritance (1874)
- Heart's-Ease in the Family (1874)
- Father Fabian, the monk of Malham Tower (1875)
- Oliver Westwood, or, Overcoming the World (1876)
- Lady Clarissa (1876)
- The Grey House at Endlestone (1877)
- Robert Wreford's Daughter (1877)
- The Brudenells of Brude (1878)
- A Woman's Patience (1879)
- Joan Carisbroke (1880)
- The Heirs of Errington (1881)
- The Story of Penelope (1881)
- Sissie (1882)
- Warleigh's Trust (1883)
- The Abbey Mill (1883)
- Amy Wilton, etc. (1883)
- Fortune's Favourite. A Novel (1885)
- Helen Bury; or The Errors of My Early Life (1885)
- Esther Wynne. A Novel (1885)
- His Next of Kin. A Novel (1887)
- Charles Eversley's Choice. A True Story (1895)
- Campion Court (date not given)
