= Laura Huxley =

Italian-American musician, author, psychotherapist and lecturer (1911–2007)

- Born: Laura Archera; 2 November 1911; Turin, Italy
- Died: 13 December 2007 (aged 96); Hollywood, Los Angeles, U.S.
- Occupations: Musician; author; psychotherapist; lecturer
- Spouse: Aldous Huxley (m. 1956; died 1963)
- Writing career
- Period: 1963–1987
- Genres: Self-help, biography

Laura Huxley (née Archera; 2 November 1911 – 13 December 2007) was an Italian-American musician, author, psychotherapist and lecturer. She was married to author Aldous Huxley from 1956 until his death in 1963.

== Early life ==
Laura Archera was born in Turin, Italy, on 2 November 1911. She began playing the violin at the age of ten, studying in Berlin, Paris and Rome, where she earned a diploma of musical teaching at 17. She also studied at the Curtis Institute of Music in Philadelphia, played in a major symphony orchestra and played before the Queen of Italy at the age of 14, and performed at Carnegie Hall in her teens.

== Life and career ==
In 1949, she was working as a freelance documentary filmmaker. According to her obituary in the Los Angeles Times, Archera called philosopher and author Aldous Huxley at home, saying that John Huston had promised to finance her proposed documentary film on the Palio di Siena if she could get Huxley to agree to write a screenplay. Archera then became close friends with Huxley and his first wife Maria, who died in 1955. In 1956, Archera married Huxley. She wrote several self-help books concerning human relations, including You Are Not the Target (1963) with a foreword written by Aldous Huxley.

After his death in 1963, she wrote This Timeless Moment: a personal view of Aldous Huxley (1968), a book describing life with her husband. In an interview with American Legends website, she recalled that she and Huxley led a simple life walking in the hills around Griffith Park and usually having dinner at home. Huxley never lost his fascination with Los Angeles. He would tell Laura: "There is everything in Los Angeles," and the city was "like Venice in the 17th century--where East and West would meet and everything would happen here."

In 1977 she founded Children: Our Ultimate Investment, also known as "Our Ultimate Investment" or just OUI, a non-profit organization dedicated to the nurturing of the possible human. The organization sponsored a four-day conference also entitled Children: Our Ultimate Investment.

== Film ==
She was a producer of documentary films, and an assistant film editor at RKO. Huxley appeared in Hofmann's Potion: The Early Years of LSD, a documentary from the National Film Board of Canada. Laura felt inspired to illuminate the story of their provocative marriage through Mary Ann Braubach's 2010 documentary, "Huxley on Huxley".

== Death ==
Laura Huxley died of cancer, aged 96, at her Hollywood Hills home.

== Awards and honours ==
Huxley received widespread recognition for her humanitarian achievements, including:

- Honorary Doctorate of Human Services from La Sierra University
- Honoree of the United Nations Fellow of the International Academy of Medical Preventics
- The 1990 World Health Foundation for Development and Peace Prize
- The 2003 Association of Prenatal and Perinatal Psychology and Health Thomas R. Verny Award, for outstanding contributions to the field of prenatal and perinatal psychology.

== Bibliography ==
- 1963 - You Are Not the Target - Metamorphous Press; Reissue edition (August 1995) ISBN 1-55552-009-X, ISBN 978-1-55552-009-0 foreword by Aldous Huxley
- 1969 - This Timeless Moment - Celestial Arts; New Ed edition (December 2000) ISBN 0-89087-968-0, ISBN 978-0-89087-968-9
- 1974 - Between Heaven and Earth - Hay House; Reprint edition (February 1, 1991) ISBN 0-937611-87-5, ISBN 978-0-937611-87-6
- 1986 - Oneaday Reason to be Happy - Compcare Publications ISBN 0-89638-112-9, ISBN 978-0-89638-112-4
- 1987 - The Child of Your Dreams (with Piero Ferrucci) - Compcare Publications ISBN 0-89638-110-2, ISBN 978-0-89638-110-0

== See also ==
- Huxley family
