= Terence Copley =

British academic and author

Terence Copley (19 August 1946 – 17 January 2011) was a British academic and author. Terence Copley was Professor of Educational Studies (Religious Education) at the University of Oxford, England and also Emeritus Professor of Religious Education at the University of Exeter, England.

He was Professor of Religious Education at the University of Exeter from 1997 until 2007. Before that, he was a Religious Education teacher and then deputy headteacher of a comprehensive school. He was a well-known speaker at academic conferences and teacher training provision.

His writings cover the history of Religious Education and 'spiritual development' in state-maintained schools in England and Wales and methods of teaching biblical narrative in primary and secondary schools. Copley has also published a biography of Thomas Arnold in which he challenged T. W. Bamford's long standing interpretation of Arnold, set forth in Bamford's writings in the 1960s and 70s, and instead upheld the more favourable view of Arnold's legacy put forth by Archer in the 1920s.

Copley was a significant Christian educationist who argues that a process of secular indoctrination is occurring in British society in which vocal secularists are using the media to exclude religion from the public square. By contrast, Copley argues for religious values to be instilled in young people through state-maintained schooling. His work includes the BIBLOS project on teaching the Bible in a secular environment. As well as writing for academics'and teachers, he has written a number of books for children.

He had a Methodist background but had been a Quaker for many decades.

In 2008 he received a Lambeth degree of DD from the Archbishop of Canterbury.

Terence Copley had been a key figure in the life and thinking of the Religious Education community in recent decades. He died from cancer on Tuesday, 17 January 2011. His funeral was held on Thursday, 27 January 2011 in Devon.

== Bibliography ==
- About the Bible; SCM, 1990. ISBN 0-564-05725-8
- A bedside book for RE teachers; London : S.C.M. Press, 1975. ISBN 0-334-00094-7 (with Donald Easton)
- The Bible: The Story Of The Book; Bible Society, 1990. ISBN 0-564-05835-1
- Black Tom : Arnold of Rugby : the myth and the man, London : Continuum, 2002.ISBN 0826457231
- Blood and Fire (Mysteries);Norwich : Religious and Moral Education Press,1996. ISBN 1-85175-108-4
- Clues and choices, Old Testament : a closer look at six Bible stories; Norwich: Religious and Moral Education Press, 1995. ISBN 0-900274-97-2
- Doves in the Rat Race: Christian Life-style Today; Epworth Press, 1989. ISBN 0-7162-0458-4
- Echo of angels : the first report of the Biblos Project; Exeter : Biblos Project, School of Education, University of Exeter, c1998. ISBN 0-85068-194-4
- First School Religious Education with Gil Copley; SCM, 1978. ISBN 0-334-00481-0
- Indoctrination, Education and God: the struggle for the mind SPCK, 2005. ISBN 0-281-05682-X
- The Judas mystery; Norwich : Religious and Moral Education Press, 1997. ISBN 1-85175-109-2
- The lost self; [Norwich] : RMEP, c1997. Series: Mystery for you to solve ISBN 1-85175-121-1
- The Man Who Never Forgot: The Story of Simon Wiesenthal; Series: Faith in Action; Norwich : Religious and Moral Education Press, 2007. ISBN 1-85175-337-0
- The missing minister; Norwich : RMEP, 1995. ISBN 1-85175-056-8
- Mysterious encounters : theme: encounter; Norwich : Religious and Moral Education Press, c2003. ISBN 1-85175-284-6
- Onward, Christian parents!; London : Church House, 1986. ISBN 0-7151-0435-7
- R.E. being served? : successful strategy and tactics for the school R.E. Department; London : CIO, 1985. ISBN 0-7151-9033-4
- RE futures / edited by Terence Copley; sponsored by the St Gabriel's Trust. Derby : PCfRE, [c1998]
- Religious education 7–11: developing primary teaching skills; London : Routledge, 1994.Series: Curriculum in primary practice series. ISBN 0-415-10125-5
- Religious Education Teacher's Christmas Carol; Church House, 1994 . ISBN 0-7151-4811-7
- Skills challenge : game-based activities for developing and assessing skills in religious education / Terence Copley and Adrian Brown. Norwich : Religious and Moral Education Press : 1992. ISBN 0-900274-56-5
- Skills challenge two : game-based activities for developing and assessing skills in religious education / Terence Copley and Adrian Brown. Norwich : Religious and Moral Education Press, 1995. ISBN 1-85175-034-7
- Spiritual development in the state school : a perspective on worship and spirituality in the education system of England and Wales; Exeter : University of Exeter Press, 2000. ISBN 0-85989-600-5 (cased) ISBN 0-85989-601-3
- Splashes of god-light: Bible Stories Retold by Jews and Christians / editors, Terence Copley ... [et al.]. Swindon : Bible Society, 1997. ISBN 0-564-04056-8
- The stolen statue; Norwich : RMEP, 1995. ISBN 1-85175-057-6
- Sudden Death at the Vicarage (Mysteries); Norwich : RMEP,1994. ISBN 0-900274-99-9
- Teaching religion : fifty years of religious education in England and Wales; Exeter : University of Exeter Press, 1997. ISBN 0-85989-489-4 (cased) ISBN 0-85989-510-6 (pbk.)
- Teaching religion : fifty years of religious education in England and Wales; Exeter : University of Exeter Press, 1997. ISBN 0-85989-489-4 (cased) ISBN 0-85989-510-6 (pbk.)
- What They Never Told You About Religious Education SCM, 1974. ISBN 0-334-01773-4 (with Donald Easton)
- Worship, worries and winners : worship in the secondary school after the 1988 Act; London : National Society, 1989. ISBN 0-7151-4782-X
- The writing on the wall; Norwich : Religious and Moral Education Press, 1994. ISBN 1-85175-019-3
