= William Thomas Arnold =

English writer and journalist

- Born: 18 September 1852; Hobart, Van Diemen's Land
- Died: 29 May 1904 (aged 51); Carlyle Square, Chelsea, England
- Occupations: Writer and journalist
- Spouse: Henrietta Wale
- Parent(s): Thomas Arnold (father); Julia Sorell (mother)
- Relatives: Mary Augusta Ward (sister); Julia Huxley (sister); Ethel Arnold (sister); Julian Huxley (nephew); Aldous Huxley (nephew)

William Thomas Arnold (18 September 1852 – 29 May 1904) was an Van Diemen's Land-born, English writer and journalist. He was a writer for The Manchester Guardian for seventeen years.

== Biography ==
Arnold was born at Hobart, Van Diemen's Land, on 18 September 1852, eldest son and second child of Thomas Arnold; his mother was Julia, daughter of William Sorell, registrar of deeds, Hobart, and his elder sister was the novelist Mrs. Humphry Ward. On the return of his parents to England in 1856 Arnold lived mainly with his father's relations at Fox How, Ambleside. From 1862 to 1865 he was at the Oratory School, Birmingham, where his father was classical master under John Henry Newman. When Thomas Arnold left the Roman Catholic church, his son was sent to Rugby School, where he lived for a year with the headmaster, Frederick Temple, and then in September 1866 entered Charles Arnold's house. He matriculated on 14 October 1871 at University College, Oxford, then under the mastership of George Bradley, and was elected to a scholarship in 1872. He took a second class both in honour moderations (in 1873) and in lit. hum. (in 1875). After graduating B.A. in 1876 Arnold settled at Oxford, combining literary work with private coaching.

In 1879 Arnold became a journalist, joining the staff of the Manchester Guardian and settling in Manchester; he wrote (and sub-edited) for the paper for 17 years. He was a Gladstonian liberal in politics, and a combative participant in the long Irish Home Rule controversy of 1885–95. He helped to develop the literary section of the Guardian and he encouraged local artists, taking part in the establishment of the Manchester School of Art. His house at Manchester was the centre of a political, literary, and artistic circle.

He retired from the Manchester Guardian, due to spinal disease, in 1898, and the next year he moved to London, where he saw friends and wrote a little. Occasionally he travelled south. On his return from a visit to St. Jean-de-Luz he died at Carlyle Square, Chelsea, on 29 May 1904. He was buried at Little Shelford, near Cambridge. A memorial volume by his sister Mary Augusta Ward and Charles Edward Montague, William Thomas Arnold, Journalist and Historian, was published in 1907.

== Politics ==
A Gladstonian liberal in politics, he fought with courage and consistency through the long home rule controversy of 1885-95. Subsequently, in 'German Ambitions as they affect Britain and the United States' (1903), a collection of letters originally contributed to the 'Spectator' under the signature 'Vigilans et Æquus', Arnold proved his mastery of foreign contemporary literature and his ability to draw prudent deductions from it. History, literature, and art continued to compete with politics for his interest.

== Leisure ==
Arnold never ceased to devote his scanty leisure to Roman history. In 1886 he published a critical edition of the section on the Punic war in his grandfather's 'History of Rome'; and contributions between 1886 and 1895 to the 'English Historical Review ' showed the strength of his interest in ancient history. As years went on Arnold grew fastidious over writing on his chosen subject; and though to the last he kept up with the latest research, eight chapters of an incomplete history of the early Roman empire, posthumously edited by E. Fiddes under the title of 'Studies in Roman Imperialism' (1906), are all that remain of his accumulated material. They bear witness to his width of knowledge, maturity of thought, and cautious temperament.

== Works ==
In 1879 he won the Arnold prize with an essay on The Roman System of Provincial Administration to the Accession of Constantine the Great, which was published in 1879. It was a digest of the literary and epigraphic sources. A new edition, revised from the author's notes by Evelyn Shirley Shuckburgh, appeared posthumously in 1906. In 1886, he published a critical edition of the section on the Punic War in his grandfather Thomas Arnold's History of Rome; and contributions between 1886 and 1895 to the English Historical Review showed his continuing interest in ancient history. Eight chapters of an incomplete history of the early Roman empire were posthumously edited by Edward Fiddes as Studies in Roman Imperialism (1906).

Arnold issued a scholarly edition of John Keats (1884; new edit. 1907). He was a contributor to Thomas Humphry Ward's English Poets (1880–2); and some dramatic reviews by him were published in The Manchester Stage, 1880–1900 (1900). He revised his father's edition of John Dryden's Essay of Dramatic Poesy in 1903. German Ambitions as they affect Britain and the United States (1903) was a collection of letters originally contributed to The Spectator under the signature "Vigilans et Æquus". (Note: Memoir of William Thomas Arnold (with portrait) by his sister, Mrs. Humphry Ward, and his colleague of the Manchester Guardian, C. E. Montague, 1907) (Note: The Times, 30 May 1904; Manchester Guardian, 30 May 1904) (Note: Quarterly Review, October 1905; Rugby School Register, 1842-1874, page 266, 1902; Foster's Alumni Oxon. 1888.)

== Family ==
In 1877 Arnold married Henrietta Wale, daughter of Charles Wale, J.P., of Little Shelford, and granddaughter of Richard Whately; she survived him, without children.
