= Kate Heyhoe =

American editor and food writer (born 1955)

Katherine Evelyn Heyhoe
- Born: April 9, 1955 (age 71); Los Angeles, California, U.S.
- Education: University of Texas
- Occupations: Author; Food writer
- Relatives: Alma Shon (mother)
- Writing career
- Years active: 1995-Present
- Literary movement: International Association of Culinary Professionals
- Website: www.kateheyhoe.com

Katherine Evelyn Heyhoe (born April 9, 1955) is an American editor and food writer. She is the author of numerous gourmet cookbooks.

== Career ==
Heyhoe has been a member of the International Association of Culinary Professionals (IACP) since 1994, when she co-founded the electronic Gourmet Guide, one of the first websites dedicated to food and cooking. In 1995 she developed food sites for America Online and in 1996 launched The Global Gourmet website which merged into the Global Gourmet in 1998. She is currently Executive Editor of The Global Gourmet and writes a monthly food column about culinary topics.

Heyhoe coined the term cookprint. Cookprint is a set of resources used to cook the food, including the ingredients, the energy and water used to prepare the food, and also the waste produced in the process.

== Personal life ==
Heyhoe is married to Thomas Way, who is also her business partner. Currently the couple lives in the Hill Country near Austin, Texas.

== Books ==
- Cooking Green: Reducing Your Carbon Footprint in the Kitchen the New Green Basics Way (Lifelong Books, Perseus Books Group, 2009)
- Great Bar Food at Home (John Wiley & Sons, 2007)
- The Stubbs Bar-B-Q Cookbook (John Wiley & Sons, 2007)
- A World Atlas of Food (McGraw-Hill, 2006)
- Macho Nachos: 50 Toppings, Salsas, and Spreads for Irresistible Snacks and Light Meals (Clarkson Potter, 2003)
- Harvesting the Dream: The Rags-to-Riches Tale of the Sutter Home Winery (with Stanley Hock, John Wiley & Sons, 2003)
- A Chicken in Every Pot: Global Recipes for the World's Most Popular Bird (Capital Books, 2003)
- Cooking with Kids for Dummies (IDG Books, 1999)
