= Thomas Arnold =

English educator and historian (1795–1842)

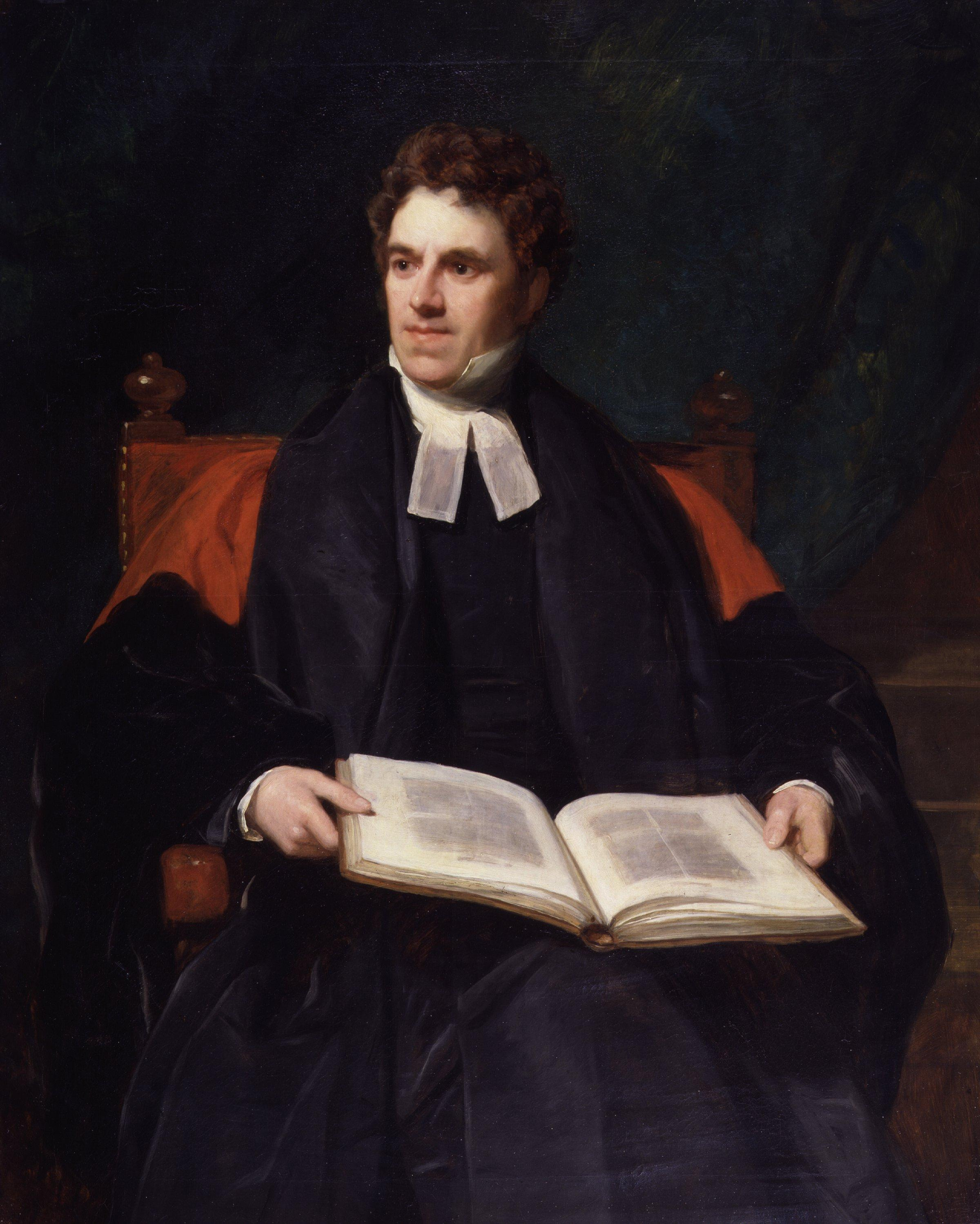
- Portrait of Thomas Arnold by Thomas Phillips, 1839
- Born: 13 June 1795; West Cowes, Isle of Wight, England
- Died: 12 June 1842 (aged 46); Fox How, Ambleside, Westmorland, England
- Resting place: Rugby School Chapel, Rugby, Warwickshire, England
- Education: Lord Weymouth's Grammar School; Winchester College; Corpus Christi College; Oxford
- Occupations: Educator and historian
- Known for: Reforms to Rugby School (immortalised in Tom Brown's Schooldays)
- Title: Regius Professor of Modern History, Oxford
- Term: 1841–1842
- Predecessor: Edward Nares
- Successor: John Antony Cramer
- Children: Matthew Arnold, Tom Arnold, William Delafield Arnold

Thomas Arnold (13 June 1795 – 12 June 1842) was an English educator and historian. He was an early supporter of the Broad Church Anglican movement. As headmaster of Rugby School from 1828 to 1841, he introduced several reforms that were widely copied by other noted public schools. His reforms redefined standards of masculinity and achievement.

== Early life and education ==
Arnold was born on the Isle of Wight, the son of William Arnold, a Customs officer, and his wife Martha Delafield (sister to John Delafield). William Arnold was related to the Arnold family of gentry from Lowestoft. Thomas was educated at Warminster School, then Winchester College and Corpus Christi College, Oxford. He excelled in classics and was made a fellow of Oriel in 1815. He became headmaster of a school in Laleham before moving to Rugby.

== Career as an educator ==
=== Rugby School ===
Arnold's appointment to the headship of Rugby School in 1828, after some years as a private tutor, turned the school's fortunes around. His force of character and religious zeal enabled him to make it a model for other public schools and exercise a strong influence on the education system of England. Though he introduced history, mathematics and modern languages, he based his teaching on the classical languages. "I assume it as the foundation of all my view of the case, that boys at a public school never will learn to speak or pronounce French well, under any circumstances," and so it would be enough if they could "learn it grammatically as a dead language." Physical science was not taught because, in Arnold's view, "it must either take the chief place in the school curriculum, or it must be left out altogether." Arnold was also opposed to the materialistic tendency of physical science, a view deriving from his Christian idealism. He wrote that "rather than have physical science the principal thing in my son's mind, I would gladly have him think that the sun went round the earth, and that the stars were so many spangles set in the bright blue firmament. Surely the one thing needful for a Christian and an Englishman to study is Christian and moral and political philosophy."

Arnold developed the praepostor (prefect) system, in which sixth-form students were given powers over every part of the school (managed by himself) and kept order in the establishment. The 1857 novel by Thomas Hughes, Tom Brown's School Days, portrays a generation of boys "who feared the Doctor with all our hearts, and very little besides in heaven or earth; who thought more of our sets in the School than of the Church of Christ, and put the traditions of Rugby and the public opinion of boys in our daily life above the laws of God."

Arnold was no great enthusiast for sport, which was permitted only as an alternative to poaching or fighting with local boys and did not become part of Rugby's curriculum until 1850. He described his educational aims as being the cure of souls first, moral development second, and intellectual development third. However, this did not prevent Baron de Coubertin from considering him the father of the organized sport he admired when he visited English public schools, including Rugby in 1886. When looking at Arnold's tomb in the school chapel he recalled that he felt suddenly as if he were looking on "the very cornerstone of the British empire". Coubertin is thought to have exaggerated the importance of sport to Thomas Arnold, whom he viewed as "one of the founders of athletic chivalry". The character-forming influence of sport, with which Coubertin was so impressed, is more likely to have originated in the novel Tom Brown's School Days than exclusively in the ideas of Arnold himself. "Thomas Arnold, the leader and classic model of English educators," wrote Coubertin, "gave the precise formula for the role of athletics in education. The cause was quickly won. Playing fields sprang up all over England."

=== Oxford University ===
Arnold was involved in not a few controversies, educational and religious. As a churchman he was a decided Erastian and strongly opposed to the High Church party. His 1833 Principles of Church Reform is linked with the beginnings of the Broad Church movement. In 1841, he was appointed Regius Professor of Modern History at Oxford.

== Works ==
Arnold's chief literary works are his unfinished History of Rome (three volumes, 1838–1842) and his Lectures on Modern History. Far more often read were his five books of sermons, which were admired by a wide circle of pious readers, including Queen Victoria.

== Family ==
Arnold married Mary Penrose, daughter of the Rev. John Penrose of Penryn, Cornwall. They had five daughters and five sons:

- Jane Martha Arnold (1821–1899), married William Edward Forster MP FRS
- Matthew Arnold (1822–1888), poet and schools inspector
- Thomas Arnold (1823–1900), literary scholar and Catholic convert
- Mary Arnold (1825–1888), married (1) Alfred Twining, (2) Rev. John Simeon Hiley, (3) Rev. Robert Hayes
- Rev. Edward Penrose Arnold (1826–1878), clergyman and schools inspector
- William Delafield Arnold (1828–1859), author and colonial administrator
- Susanna Elizabeth Lydia Arnold (1830–1911), married John Wakefield Cropper
- Frances Trevenen Arnold (1832), died in infancy
- Frances Bunsen Trevenen Whateley Arnold (1833–1923)
- Walter Thomas Arnold (1835–1893)

W. E. Forster and Jane both enjoyed mountaineering; they climbed Mont Blanc in 1859 and in 1860 Jane was one of the first women to stand on the summit of Monte Rosa, which had not been climbed by a woman until 1857. When William Delafield Arnold died in 1859 leaving four orphans, the Forsters adopted them as their own, adding their name to the children's surname. One of them was Hugh Oakeley Arnold-Forster, a Liberal Unionist MP, who eventually became a member of Balfour's cabinet. Another was Florence Vere O'Brien, a diarist, philanthropist and craftswoman who lived in Ireland. Frances Bunsen Trevenen Whateley Arnold, the youngest daughter, never married and died at Fox How in 1923.

Arnold had bought the small estate of Fox How near Ambleside in the Lake District in 1832, and spent many holidays there. On Sunday, 12 June 1842, he died there suddenly of a heart attack "at the height of his powers", a day before his 47th birthday. He is buried in Rugby School chapel. Thomas the Younger's daughter Mary Augusta Arnold, became a well-known novelist under her married name, Mrs. Humphry Ward. His other daughter, Julia, married Leonard Huxley, the son of Thomas Huxley. Their sons were Julian and Aldous Huxley. Julia Arnold founded in 1902 Prior's Field School for girls in Godalming, Surrey.

Arnold family tree (partial)

Thomas Arnold; 1795–1842	Mary Penrose; 1791–1873
Matthew Arnold; 1822–1888	Tom Arnold; 1823–1900	Julia Sorell; 1826–1888	William Delafield Arnold; 1828–1859	Jane Martha Arnold; 1821–1899	William Edward Forster; 1818–1886
Ethel Arnold; 186?-1930	Mary Augusta Ward; 1851–1920	Julia Arnold; 1862–1908	Leonard Huxley; 1860–1933	H. O. Arnold-Forster; 1855–1909	Lucy Story-Maskelyne; 1861–1951
Julian Huxley; 1887–1975	Aldous Huxley; 1894–1963	William Arnold-Forster; 1886–1951	Katherine Laird Cox; 1887–1938
Matthew Huxley; 1920-2005	Mark Arnold-Forster; 1920–1981

Key
	descent	adoption
	marriage

== Reputation ==
The Life of Doctor Arnold, published two years after his death by one of Arnold's former pupils, Arthur Penrhyn Stanley, is seen as one of the best works of its class in the language and added to his growing reputation. A popular life of Arnold by the novelist Emma Jane Guyton also appeared. In 1896 his bust was unveiled in Westminster Abbey alongside that of his son, Matthew. The Times asserted, "As much as any who could be named, Arnold helped to form the standard of manly worth by which Englishmen judge and submit to be judged." However, his reputation suffered as one of the Eminent Victorians in Lytton Strachey's book of that title published in 1918.

A more recent public-school headmaster, Michael McCrum of Tonbridge School and Eton College in the 1960s to 1980s, also a churchman and Oxbridge academic (Master of Corpus Christi College, Cambridge and Vice-Chancellor), wrote a biography and reappraisal of Arnold in 1991. He had briefly been a master at Rugby and was married to the daughter of another former headmaster. More recently, a biography entitled Black Tom was written by Terence Copley. Both McCrum and Copley seek to restore some lustre to the Arnold legacy, which had been under attack since Strachey's sardonic appraisal.

A. C. Benson once observed of Arnold, "A man who could burst into tears at his own dinner-table on hearing a comparison made between St. Paul and St. John to the detriment of the latter, and beg that the subject might never be mentioned again in his presence, could never have been an 'easy' companion."

== Depictions on screen ==
Arnold has been played several times in adaptations of Tom Brown's School Days, including by Sir Cedric Hardwicke in the 1940 film version, Robert Newton in the 1951 film version, Iain Cuthbertson in the 1971 television version, and Stephen Fry in the 2005 television version.

== Works ==
- The Christian Duty of Granting the Claims of the Roman Catholics (pamphlet) Rugby, 1828
- Sermons Preached in the Chapel of Rugby School. London: Fellowes, 1850 (first edition, 1832)
- Principles of Church Reform, Oxford: Fellowes,1833
- History of Rome, London: Fellowes, 1838, Volume I. Volume II.
- Introductory Lectures on Modern History, London: Longmans, Green & Co, 1842
- Sermons: Christian Life, its Hopes, Fears and Close, London: Fellowes, 1842
- Sermons: Christian Life, its Course, its Hindrances, and its Helps, London: Fellowes, 1844
- As translator: The History of the Peloponnesian War by Thucydides, (3 vols.) London: Fellowes, 1845. Volume I. Volume II. Volume III.
- The Interpretation of Scripture, London: Fellowes, 1845
