= Ethel Ann Burton-Brown =

Ethel Ann Burton-Brown, née Marshall (1868-1927) was an English educator. She was headmistress of Prior's Field School from 1908 to 1927.

== Life ==
Ethel Marshall was born in Hertford in 1868. She was the daughter of the Rev. Charles Marshall and Elizabeth Mary Tripe, later Metham. She was educated at Highfield School, Hendon, the girls school set up by Fanny Metcalfe.

In 1886 she went up to Girton College, Cambridge. Though she initially wanted to study classics, her Girton tutors persuaded her to switch to history. She was taught by Gwatkin and Mandell Creighton, who both became friends and mentors to her. She achieved a first-class in her examination, though as a woman was denied a Cambridge degree.

=== Life in India and Rome ===
Marshall married Frederick Hewlett Burton-Brown, becoming Ethel Burton-Brown and moved to India with her husband when he joined the Indian Army Medical Service. Her first two children, Beatrice and Margaret, were born there but died in infancy. On returning to London, Burton-Brown worked at the Women's University Settlement in Southwark.

In 1896 her husband bought a medical practice in Rome, and the family moved there. There she came to know the archaeologist Giacomo Boni, and wrote an English guidebook to Boni's excavations of the Roman Forum. She also gained extensive knowledge of Italian painting. Burton-Brown had twin boys, Christopher and Theodore, who were born in Italy.

=== Return to England and work in education ===
In 1904 her husband was forced to give up his medical practice, and the family returned to England. After he had made several unsuccessful attempts to set up an English practice, the marriage failed. A judicial separation between Frederick and Ethel Ann was drawn up, and Frederick left the family to move abroad.

Ethel Burton-Brown took up lecturing to obtain an income. After lecturing in Cambridge on the recent Roman Forum excavations, she was made an Honorary Fellow of the Cambridge Classical Society and the Royal Historical Society.

From 1905 Burton-Brownn gave regular weekly lectures on Italian art at Prior's Field School, founded in 1902 by Julia Huxley. Burton-Brown became friends with Huxley and became joint headmistress with her in April 1906. Burton-Brown took over as sole headmistress after Huxley's health failed. For the next two decades she dedicated herself to the school.

=== Death and commemoration ===
Ethel Burton Brown died on 21 March 1927. She is buried near Huxley at Compton, Guildford.

Her daughter Beatrice (1892-1964) succeeded her as headmistress of the school.

== Works ==
- Recent excavations in the Roman Forum, 1898-1904. London: Murray, 1904.
