= William Rice (food journalist) =

American food journalist

William Rice (1938–2016) was an American food journalist. He worked for the Chicago Tribune, the Washington Post, and Food & Wine over the course of his career.
