= Tom Arnold (literary scholar) =

English literary scholar (1823–1900)

Thomas Arnold
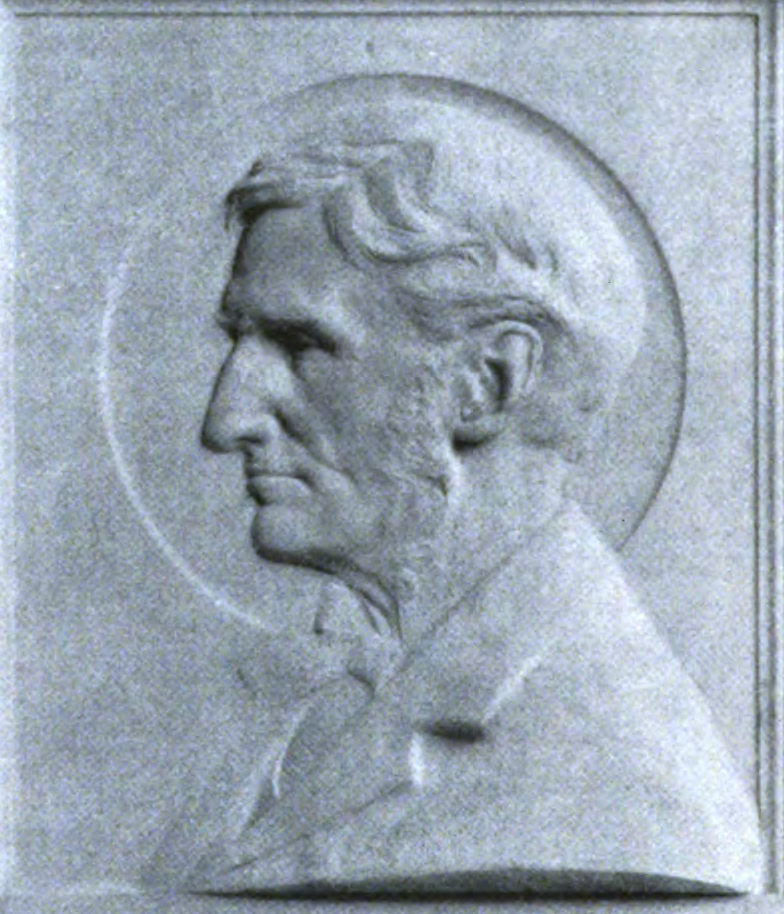
- from the plaque in Newman University Church, Dublin
- Born: 30 November 1823; Staines, Surrey, England
- Died: 12 November 1900 (aged 76); Dublin, Ireland
- Occupations: School inspector, teacher, writer, academic
- Spouses: Julia Sorell (died 1888) Josephine Maria Benison (m. 1890)
- Children: 9 (including Mary Augusta, William, Julia and Ethel)
- Relatives: Thomas Arnold (father); Matthew Arnold (brother); William Delafield Arnold (brother); Julian Huxley (grandson); Aldous Huxley (grandson)
- Writing career
- Period: Victorian
- Genre: non-fiction
- Subject: History of literature

Family tree

Thomas Arnold (30 November 1823 – 12 November 1900), also known as Thomas Arnold the Younger, was an English literary scholar.

== Life ==
He was the second son of Thomas Arnold, headmaster of Rugby School, and his wife Mary Penrose. He was the younger brother of the poet Matthew Arnold and the elder brother of author and colonial administrator William Delafield Arnold. After gaining a first class degree at University College, Oxford, Arnold grew discontented with Victorian Britain and attempted to take up farming in New Zealand. Failing to make a success of this career, in 1850 he moved to Tasmania, having been invited to take the job of Inspector of Schools by Governor William Denison. Soon after arriving in Hobart, he fell in love with and married Julia Sorell, granddaughter of former Governor William Sorell. They had nine children (four of whom died young), among them: Ethel, who was a suffragist and child model; Mary, who became a novelist under the name Mrs Humphry Ward; Julia, who married Leonard Huxley, the son of Thomas, and gave birth to Julian and Aldous; and William Thomas the journalist. After being widowed in 1888, Arnold married for a second time in 1890, to Josephine Maria Benison, daughter of James Benison, Ballyconnell, County Cavan, Ireland.

While in Tasmania, Arnold converted from Anglicanism to Roman Catholicism, a move which angered his Protestant wife sufficiently to cause her to smash the windows of the chapel during his confirmation. The marriage was to be plagued by domestic strife over religious loyalty until Julia's death. At the time, Tasmania would not employ Catholics in senior civil service positions, and so in 1857 the family moved back to England. Arnold took a job teaching English literature at the Catholic University in Dublin, and wrote A Manual of English Literature (1862), which became a standard textbook. He resigned from the university in 1862 to become head of classics at The Oratory School in Birmingham. He left in 1865, when a letter he had written insisting that he would need a higher salary to continue at the school was interpreted by Cardinal Newman as a tendering of resignation.

Arnold opened a private tutoring establishment in Oxford, and began to attend Church of England services. He edited a number of important literary works, including Beowulf. In 1876 he stood for election to the Chair of Anglo-Saxon at Oxford. Finding that some supporters were campaigning for him as the "Anglican" candidate, he felt this put him in a false position; on the eve of the election he announced his intention of being reconciled to the Catholic Church. It is unlikely that this had much effect on the election, but family tradition maintained that he had cast away a great opportunity for a scruple. After a period of financial hardship, in which his main occupation was editorial work for the Rolls Series, Arnold returned to Dublin in 1882 as professor of English literature at University College, teaching to the end of his life in 1900. One of his last students was James Joyce.

== Publications ==
=== As author ===
- A Manual of English Literature, Historical and Critical. London: Longman & Co., 1862 (much reprinted to 1897).
- Chaucer to Wordsworth: a Short History of English Literature to the present day. London: Thomas Murby, 1870. 2nd ed. 1875.
- Catholic Higher Education in Ireland. Dublin: M. H. Gill & Son, 1897.
- Notes on Beowulf. London: Longmans, Green, 1898.
- Passages in a Wandering Life. London: Edward Arnold, 1900.

=== As editor ===
- Select English Works of John Wycliffe from Original Manuscripts. 3 vols. Oxford: Clarendon Press, 1869–1871.
- Selections from Addison's Papers contributed to the Spectator. Oxford: Clarendon Press, 1875.
- Beowulf: a Heroic Poem of the Eighth Century, with a translation. London: Longmans, Green, 1876.
- Henrici Archidiaconi Huntendunensis Historia Anglorum. The History of the English, by Henry, Archdeacon of Huntingdon, from A.D. 55 to A.D. 1154. Chronicles and memorials of Great Britain and Ireland during the Middle Ages ("Rolls Series") 74. London: Longman & Co., 1879.
- English Poetry and Prose: a collection of illustrative passages from the writings of English authors, commencing in the Anglo-Saxon period, and brought down to the present time. 2nd edition. London: Longmans, Green, and Co., 1882.
- Symeonis monachi opera omnia. 2 vols. Rolls Series 75. London: Longman & Co., 1882–1885.
- Together with William E. Addis he compiled A Catholic Dictionary. First edition, London: Kegan Paul & Co., 1884. Much reissued.
- "Annales Sancti Edmundi (Harl. 447.)", Memorials of St. Edmund's Abbey, Vol. II, London: Eyre & Spottiswoode, 1892, pp. vii–viii & 1–25.
- Edward Hyde, The History of the Rebellion and Civil Wars in England. Book VI. Second edition, 1894.
- "Cronica Buriensis. A.D. 1020–1346. (Publ. Libr. Cambridge, Add. MS. 850.)", Memorials of St. Edmund's Abbey, Vol. III, London: Eyre & Spottiswoode, 1896, pp. vii–xv & 1–73.
