= Leonard Huxley (physicist) =

Australian physicist

Sir Leonard Huxley KBE, FAA
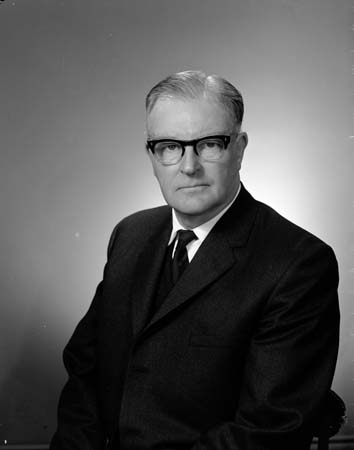
- Born: Leonard George Holden Huxley; 29 May 1902; London, England
- Died: 4 September 1988 (aged 86); London, England
- Education: University of Tasmania; University of Oxford
- Spouse: Ella Mary Child 'Molly' Copeland
- Children: 2, including George Leonard Huxley
- Awards: Foundation Fellow of the Australian Academy of Science
- Scientific career
- Fields: Physics
- Workplaces: Australian Radio Research Board

Sir Leonard George Holden Huxley KBE, FAA (29 May 1902 – 4 September 1988) was an Australian physicist.

Huxley was born in London, the eldest son of George Hamborough and Lilian Huxley. He was a second-cousin once removed of Thomas Huxley. His family migrated from England to Australia in 1905 when he was three, and settled in Tasmania, where Huxley showed great academic and sporting promise while attending The Hutchins School. He won a Rhodes Scholarship to New College, Oxford while in his second year at the University of Tasmania and obtained a D.Phil. from Oxford in 1928. On 5 October 1929 he married Ella Mary Child 'Molly' Copeland who was reading history at Somerville College.

Huxley was a physicist at the Australian Radio Research Board, Council for Scientific and Industrial Research 1929 to 1931; Lecturer in Physics, University College, Leicester 1932 to 1940; Principal Scientific Officer, Ministry of Aircraft Production, UK 1940 to 1946; Reader in Electromagnetism, University of Birmingham 1946 to 1949; Professor of Physics, University of Adelaide 1949 to 1960; and Vice-Chancellor, Australian National University 1960 to 1967.

Huxley was president of the Australian Branch of the Institute of Physics (UK) 1954 to 1955; and president of the Australian Institute of Physics 1962 to 1965.

He was elected a Foundation Fellow of the Australian Academy of Science in 1953, and knighted in 1964.

Huxley died in London at the age of 86.

== See also ==
- Huxley family

Academic offices
Preceded by Leslie Melville	3rd Vice-Chancellor of the Australian National University; 1960–1967	Succeeded by Sir John Crawford
