= Word ladder =

Word game

Lewis Carroll's doublet in Vanity Fair, March 1879 changing the word "head" to "tail" in five steps, one letter at a time

Word ladder (Note: Also known as Doublets, word-links, change-the-word puzzles, paragrams, laddergrams, or word golf.) is a word game invented by Lewis Carroll. A word ladder puzzle begins with two words, and to solve the puzzle one must find a chain of other words to link the two, in which two adjacent words (that is, words in successive steps) differ by exactly one letter.

== History ==
Lewis Carroll says that he invented the game on Christmas in 1877. Carroll devised the word game for Julia and Ethel Arnold. The first mention of the game in Carroll's diary was on 12 March 1878, which he originally called "Word-links", and described as a two-player game. Carroll published a series of word ladder puzzles and solutions, which he then called "Doublets", in the magazine Vanity Fair, beginning with the 29 March 1879 issue. Later that year, it was made into a book, published by Macmillan and Co.

J. E. Surrick and L. M. Conant published a book titled Laddergrams of such puzzles in 1927.

Vladimir Nabokov alluded to the game using the name "word golf" in the novel Pale Fire, in which the narrator says 'some of my records are: hate—love in three, lass—male in four, and live—dead in five (with "lend" in the middle).'

The game was revived in Australia in the 1990s by The Canberra Times as "Stepword".

Word ladders are often featured in the New York Times crossword puzzle.

== Rules ==
The player is given a start word and an end word. In order to win the game, the player must progressively change the start word into the end word, creating an existing word at each step. Each step consists of a single letter substitution. For example, the following are the seven shortest solutions to the word ladder puzzle between words "cold" and "warm", using words from Collins Scrabble Words.

COLD	→	CORD	→	CORM	→	WORM	→	WARM
COLD	→	CORD	→	CARD	→	WARD	→	WARM
COLD	→	CORD	→	WORD	→	WARD	→	WARM
COLD	→	CORD	→	WORD	→	WORM	→	WARM
COLD	→	WOLD	→	WORD	→	WORM	→	WARM
COLD	→	WOLD	→	WORD	→	WARD	→	WARM
COLD	→	WOLD	→	WALD	→	WARD	→	WARM

As each step changes only one letter, the number of steps must be at least the Hamming distance between the two words – four in the above example. Lewis Carroll's example has an extra fifth step as the third letter changes twice.

Often, word ladder puzzles are created where the end word has some kind of relationship with the start word (synonymous, antonymous, semantic...). This was also the way the game was originally devised by Lewis Carroll when it first appeared in Vanity Fair.

Some variations also allow the player to add or remove letters, and to rearrange the same letters into a different order (an anagram).

== Five-letter word ladders ==
Donald Knuth used a computer to study word ladders of five-letter words. He felt that three and four were too easy and six was too hard. Knuth used a collection of 5,757 common English five-letter words, excluding proper nouns. He wrote a program which showed the steps connecting any two words, or noted that no connection was possible. He found that many word pairs were connected, but that 671 words were not connected to any other word, i.e 'had no neighbours', as he put it. He called these words "aloof", and noted amusingly that "aloof" is itself such a word.

== See also ==
- Paronym
