= Julia Huxley =

British biographer and writer (1862–1908)

Julia Arnold Huxley
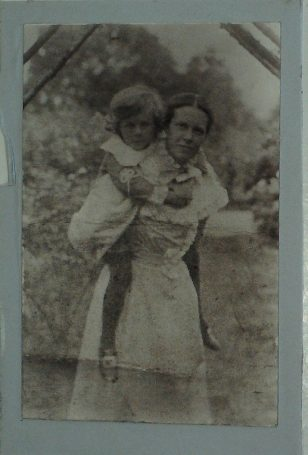
- Julia and Aldous in 1898
- Born: Julia Arnold; 1862
- Died: 1908 (aged 46)
- Education: Somerville College
- Occupation: Headteacher
- Known for: Founding Prior's Field School
- Spouse: Leonard Huxley
- Children: 4 (including Julian and Aldous)
- Parent(s): Thomas Arnold (father); Julia Sorell (mother)
- Relatives: Mary Augusta Ward (sister); William Thomas Arnold (brother); Ethel Arnold (sister); Matthew Arnold (uncle); William Delafield Arnold (uncle); Thomas Arnold (grandfather); William Sorell (great-grandfather); Hugh Oakeley Arnold-Forster (cousin); Florence Vere O'Brien (cousin)

Julia Huxley (née Arnold; 1862–1908) was a British scholar. She founded Prior's Field School for girls, in Godalming, Surrey in 1902.

== Early life ==
Born Julia Arnold in 1862 to Julia Arnold (née Sorell), the granddaughter of William Sorell, and Thomas Arnold, a literary scholar, she was the niece of critic Matthew Arnold and author and colonial administrator William Delafield Arnold and the sister of Mary Augusta Ward (Mrs Humphry Ward), the writer and journalist William Thomas Arnold, and the suffrage campaigner Ethel Arnold.

Arnold met Lewis Carroll as a child and she and her sister Ethel featured in a number of his photographs. Ethel later reported that she enjoyed the attention as a break from her less than happy home life. Ethel was to remain friends with Lewis Carroll as an adult. For Christmas in 1877, Lewis Carroll devised the word game of Doublets for Julia and Ethel. The game was later published by Vanity Fair and by Carroll.

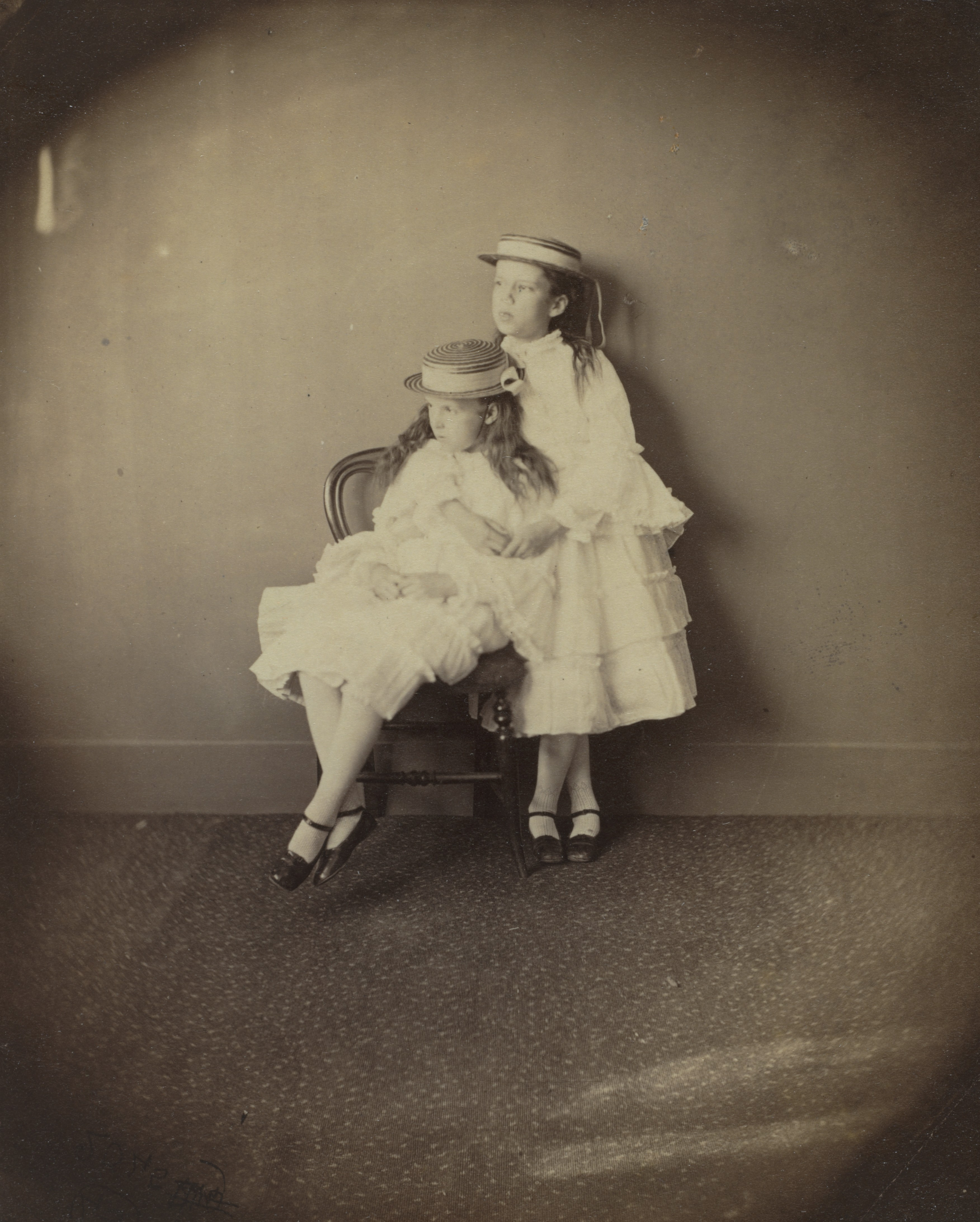
Julia and her sister Ethel Arnold in 1872 by Lewis Carroll

She went to Somerville College, Oxford where she was awarded a First in English Literature in 1882. Julia married Leonard Huxley in 1885.

== Prior's Field School ==
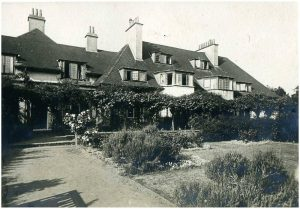
Prior's Field School in 1904

In January, 1902, Julia Huxley founded Prior's Field School for girls, in Godalming, Surrey. The school was established on a five-acre (2 ha) plot with a moderately sized house designed by C.F.A. Voysey.

Huxley opened the school with herself as head, with one boarder, five day girls, Miss English, Mademoiselle Bonnet, a wire-haired terrier and her 7 1/2-year-old son, Aldous.

As the head she taught her students about cultural value, solitude and to be bibliophiles. She was a disciplined teacher. Early student Enid Bagnold found the education she received from Huxley's school 'stimulating'.

== Death and legacy ==
She died, at the age of 46, of cancer in 1908. At that time she had been headmistress for six years. In June 1908 her school had 85 pupils and 86 "Old Girls". She was succeeded as headmistress by Ethel Burton-Brown, who had been her manager.

Huxley's funeral service took place in the Watts Cemetery Chapel and she was buried close to one of it walls. The pupils from the school attended the service. Leonard Huxley and her son Aldous's ashes were also later buried there.

In March 2017, Prior's Field School opened a new Science, Technology and Music Centre, named the Arnold Building, in memory of her.

== Private life ==
Julia and Leonard Huxley married in 1885 and had four children together: Julian Sorell Huxley (1887–1975), Noel Trevenen (or Trevelyan) Huxley (1889–1914), the novelist Aldous Leonard Huxley (1894–1963) and Margaret Arnold Huxley (1899–1981).

Julia wrote a letter to Aldous as she was dying and he carried this with him for the rest of his life. It included the thought "Judge not too much and love more". Scholars of Aldous's works can see his mother's death in his cynical attitude and his books including Eyeless in Gaza, Brave New World and the Utopian Island.
