= Ellen Hovde =

American film director, producer, and editor (1925–2023)

- Born: 9 March 1925; Meadville, Pennsylvania
- Died: 16 February 2023 (aged 97)
- Occupation: Documentarian
- Spouses: Matthew Huxley (m. 1950; div. 1961): Adam Edward Giffard
- Children: 2

Ellen Margerethe Hovde (March 9, 1925 – February 16, 2023) was an American documentarian. She co-directed Grey Gardens with the Maysles brothers. She won a Primetime Emmy Award for Outstanding Documentary or Nonfiction Special for producing the 2002 series Benjamin Franklin for PBS.

== Early life and education ==
Ellen Margerethe Hovde was born on March 9, 1925, in Meadville, Pennsylvania. Her father, Brynjolf was the president of the New School for Social Research from 1945 to 1950. Her mother Therese was a nurse.

In 1947, Hovde received a degree in theater from the Carnegie Institute of Technology. She then studied at the University of Oslo.

== Personal life and death ==
Hovde was married to Matthew Huxley from 1950 until their divorce in 1961. Together they had two children. She later remarried, to Adam Edward Giffard, but that marriage also ended in divorce.

She died at her home in Brooklyn from Alzheimer's disease on February 16, 2023, at the age of 97.
