= Ruth Ellen Church =

American wine writer (1909-1991)

Ruth Ellen (Lovrien) Church (November 9, 1909 — August 20, 1991) was an American food and wine journalist and book author. She spent 38 years as the Chicago Tribune’s food editor and became the first person to write a wine column for a major U.S. paper in 1962, a decade before Frank Prial's column for the New York Times.

== Early life ==
Ruth Ellen Lovrien was born in Humboldt, Iowa, in 1909. Church graduated from Iowa State Agricultural College with a degree in home economics journalism in 1933. She had been a staff writer for the yearbook, and an editor of the Green Gander, a student publication. After a brief stint as the society editor of a small Iowa daily, she applied in 1936 for the cooking editor job at the Chicago Tribune, thinking she had no chance, and was hired. She moved to Chicago, and later that year married Freeman S. Church, an advertising agency artist and executive. She and her husband had two children, Charles F. Church II and Carter L. Church. The family lived in the North Beverly neighborhood on the city’s far southwest side.

== Career ==
Church began her nearly 40-year career at the Chicago Tribune writing food columns under the byline Mary Meade. As the paper’s food editor, she was in charge of developing one of the first newspaper test kitchens and directing all food photography. In 1962 the paper asked her to write a second column on wine. She agreed and became the nation’s first syndicated wine columnist. That column, “Let’s Learn About Wines,” ran for nearly 20 years, well beyond her 1974 retirement as food editor.

During her early years at the Tribune, Church and her staff attracted national and even international interest through the Chicago Tribune-New York News syndicate (the Tribune had purchased the tabloid New York News in 1919). An article in the June 4, 1948, Tribune headed “Thousands Ask Mary Meade’s Aid in Cooking,” notes: “A London woman who only gets 1 ounce of fat a week for cooking, boils the fat out of marrow bones so she can bake a coffee cake from a Mary Meade recipe…. A medical officer serving in Japan and the Aleutians is stumped for a recipe for black bean soup. So he writes to Mary Meade and gets a recipe. […] In a southern Illinois town, a bank cashier […] had trouble because the coconut he uses in his cakes had a habit of drying out. So he wrote to Mary Meade and now his coconut doesn’t dry out anymore. […] These are only a sample of the 6,753 mail and telephone requests for aid that poured into Mary Meade’s office in Tribune Tower in the first four months of this year. […] But it wasn’t all one-way traffic. In the same period, 6,964 persons sent in recipes for Mary Meade’s daily prize recipe contest.”

Church was the author of several cookbooks and books on wine, under both her byline and her own name, including Mary Meade’s Magic Recipes for the Electric Blender (1952, reprinted in 1956, when blenders added a second speed, and given to purchasers of Oster blenders); Mary Meade’s Kitchen Companion (1955); Pancakes Aplenty (1962); Mary Meade’s Country Cookbook (1964, the Cook Book Guild Book of the Month, October, 1965); Mary Meade’s Sausage Cookbook (1967); The Burger Cookbook (1967); The American Guide to Wines (1963); and Entertaining with Wine (1976).

Church regularly reported from the wine-exporting regions of Europe and followed the beginnings of the fine wine industries in the Finger Lakes District of New York and in California, writing in 1963 that “wine growers from many European countries are coming to our shores in increasing numbers to see our vineyards and talk with our leading technologists. They are even carrying back with them new ideas from some of our own educational institutions, notably the University of California at Davis, where the science of vine growing and wine making is being developed to a degree which fascinates the whole world.”

The perspectives of Church and the Tribune were unique in the U.S. in the 1960s, a decade before the blossoming of interest in food and drink worlds beyond steak dinners and cocktails, and five years before California produced more table wine than fortified wine.

According to Kimberly Wilmot Voss, author of The Food Section: Newspaper Women and the Culinary Community (2014) and a journalism professor at the University of Central Florida, food pages have been a part of newspapers for more than a hundred years, but were often considered to “nothing more than a collection of casserole recipes and plugs for local grocery stores and other advertisers [….] ‘the powder puff side of journalism.'" In her book, Voss says that food editors wrote about topics the advertisers wouldn't have supported, such as food safety and consumer economizing, poverty and nutrition, that they believed validated some closeness to advertisers. Some critics viewed articles about new products as a form of advertising, but the journalists believed that new products needed to be evaluated and explained to their readers. Church wrote in 1955 "that the changes in the food industry were ‘revolutionary […] [F]ully a third of the products and foods we buy now in the supermarket were not even in existence 10 years ago: instant puddings, cake mixes, instant coffee, instant dry milk, detergents, the wide array of frozen and pre-packaged foods.’”

In 1955, Church supervised five home economists, a secretary, and a kitchen assistant. She wrote that, “we do most of our own food photographs, conduct a daily $5 favorite recipe competition, maintain a mail and telephone service to homemakers, scout for what’s new in the kitchen, test recipes and such. In addition, I write a daily and Sunday column, and supervise the publication of a number of supplements each year, notably the Thanksgiving and Christmas special sections.”

One important sign of development in food journalism was nationwide meetings of the editors and writers, especially the Newspaper Food Editors Conference, held annually beginning in 1944 and sponsored by the Newspaper Advertising Sales Association. Critics claimed this was a violation of journalistic ethics. Church simply called it a “meeting of the people who write about food with the people who produce the food we write about.” One of the critics was senator Frank Moss (D., Utah), a consumer advocate invited to speak at one of the conventions, who told his audience the convention was an example of “female chauvinism” and reportedly called the group “the whores of the supermarket industry.”

Another fierce critic, Richard Karp, wrote an article for the Columbia Journalism Review titled “Newspaper Food Pages: Credibility for Sale” that drew furious public responses from several food editors. Church, in an industry magazine article titled What Richard Karp Said She Said and What She Actually Said wrote that she had interviewed each of the food editors Karp identified in his article and put it plainly: “The comments attributed to these ladies are unbelievable and in fact, untrue.”

== Death and legacy ==
Church died in the early morning of August 20, 1991 at the hands of a burglar and assailant. Her son stated that Church had been strangled with a scarf and had her hands tied with cloth. She is buried in Mt. Hope Cemetery, Chicago, in the Church family plot next to her husband. She is survived by her sons, Charles and Carter, their wives, and five grandchildren. Women in journalism scholar Kimberly Wilmot Voss said she "set the standard for quality newspaper food journalism at an important time in food history".

In 1984 she was awarded Iowa State University's Schwartz Award. She received several Vesta awards and her Mary Meade's Country Cookbook was a Cookbook Guild book of the month in 1965.

== Books ==
- Church, Ruth Ellen. Mary Meade's Magic Recipes for the Electric Blender, Bobbs-Merrill Company, Inc., 1952 LCCCN 52-10689
- Church, Ruth Ellen. Mary Meade's Kitchen Companion, Bobbs-Merrill 1955 LCCCN 55-10903
- Church, Ruth Ellen. The Burger Cookbook, Rand McNally & Company, 1961 LCCCN 61-10120
- Church, Ruth Ellen. The Burger Cookbook, Paperback Library, Inc., 1967
- Church, Ruth Ellen. Pancakes Aplenty, Rand McNally, 1962 LCCCN 62-16702
- Church, Ruth Ellen. Mary Meade's Country Cookbook, Rand McNally, 1964 LCCCN 64-17448
- Church, Ruth Ellen. Mary Meade's Sausage Cookbook, Rand McNally, 1967 LCCCN 67-18283
- Church, Ruth Ellen. The American Guide to Wines, Quadrangle Books, Inc., 1963 LCCCN 63-018471
- Church, Ruth Ellen. The American Guide to Wines, Funk & Wagnalls paperbound, 1968
- Church, Ruth Ellen. Entertaining with Wine, Rand McNally, 1976 ISBN 978-0528880148
- Church, Ruth Ellen. Favorite American Wines and How to Enjoy Them, Meredith Corp.,1963 LCCCN 79-108581
- Church, Ruth Ellen. Wines of the Midwest, Swallow Press Books/Ohio University Press 1982 ISBN 0-8040-0779-9 (cloth) & 0-8040-0426-9 (paper)

== Pamphlets, Newsletters ==
- Meade, Mary. 52 Breads of the Week, Chicago Tribune, 32 pp., N.D
- Meade, Mary. 52 Cakes-of-the-Week, Chicago Tribune, 55 pp., 1950
- Meade, Mary. 52 Pies of the Week, Chicago Tribune, 28 pp., N.D.
- Meade, Mary. Mary Meade Recipes -Cakes of All Kinds, Chicago Tribune, 55 pp., N.D.
- Meade, Mary, ed. Favorite Cookie Recipes by Chicago Home Economists, Chicago Tribune, 24 pp.,1949*
- Meade, Mary. Food for a Crowd, Chicago Tribune, 44 pp., N.D
- Meade, Mary. Mary Meade's Candy Book, Chicago Tribune, 40 pp., N.D
- Meade, Mary et al. Meals Men Like, Presented by Mary Meade and Staff, Chicago Tribune, 10 pp., 8.5 x 11" folded. On cover: "Presented for Chicago Home Economics in Business"
- Meade, Mary. Mary Meade's Pickle and Relish Book, Chicago Tribune, 14 pp., 8.5 x 11" folded.
- Meade, Mary. Thirst Quenchers, Chicago Tribune, 28 pp., N.D. (An article in the Friday, July 17, 1942, issue, on page 14, lists this and more than 30 other booklets available for 3 to 20 cents in person from the Tribune's Public Service Office at 1 S. Dearborn, St., or at the Tribune Tower on North Michigan Ave., or by mail for between 3 and 20 cents.)
- Church, Ruth Ellen. What's Cooking in Europe, Chicago Tribune, 45 pp., N.D.**
