= Laurence Collier =

British diplomat

- Born: 1890
- Died: 20 October 1976 (aged 85–86)
- Education: Bedales School; Balliol College, Oxford
- Spouse: Eleanor Watson (m. 1917)
- Children: 1
- Parent(s): John Collier; Ethel Huxley

Sir Laurence Collier KCMG (1890 – 20 October 1976) was the British ambassador to Norway between 1939 and 1950, including the period when Norway's government was in exile in London during the Second World War.

== Biography ==
Laurence Collier was the son of the artist John Collier and his second wife Ethel Huxley, the daughter of Thomas Huxley. His paternal grandfather was Robert Collier, 1st Baron Monkswell. He was born on 13 June 1890, at 4 Marlborough Place, Marylebone, London; and educated at Bedales School in Hampshire, and Balliol College, Oxford.

He married Eleanor Watson on 31 May 1917 at St. Paul's Church, Hampstead; they had one son, William, b. 26 Nov 1919.

His diplomatic career included postings in Tokyo 1919–1921 before returning to the Foreign Office in London, where he was Head of the Northern section, monitoring German actions towards Scandinavia. In 1940, he advised the UK Government that they should intervene against the German invasion of Norway.

Collier served as British Ambassador to the Norwegian Government in exile in London during World War II, and post-war in Oslo 1945–1950.

Collier was the author of "Flight from conflict" (1944) and wrote the foreword to Dorothy Baden-Powell's book "Pimpernel Gold: How Norway foiled the Nazis".

He died on 20 October 1976 at the King's Ride Nursing Home, 289 Sheen Road, Richmond upon Thames.
