= Prior's Field School =

Private school in Surrey, UK

Coordinates: 51°12′25.2″N 0°38′27.6″W

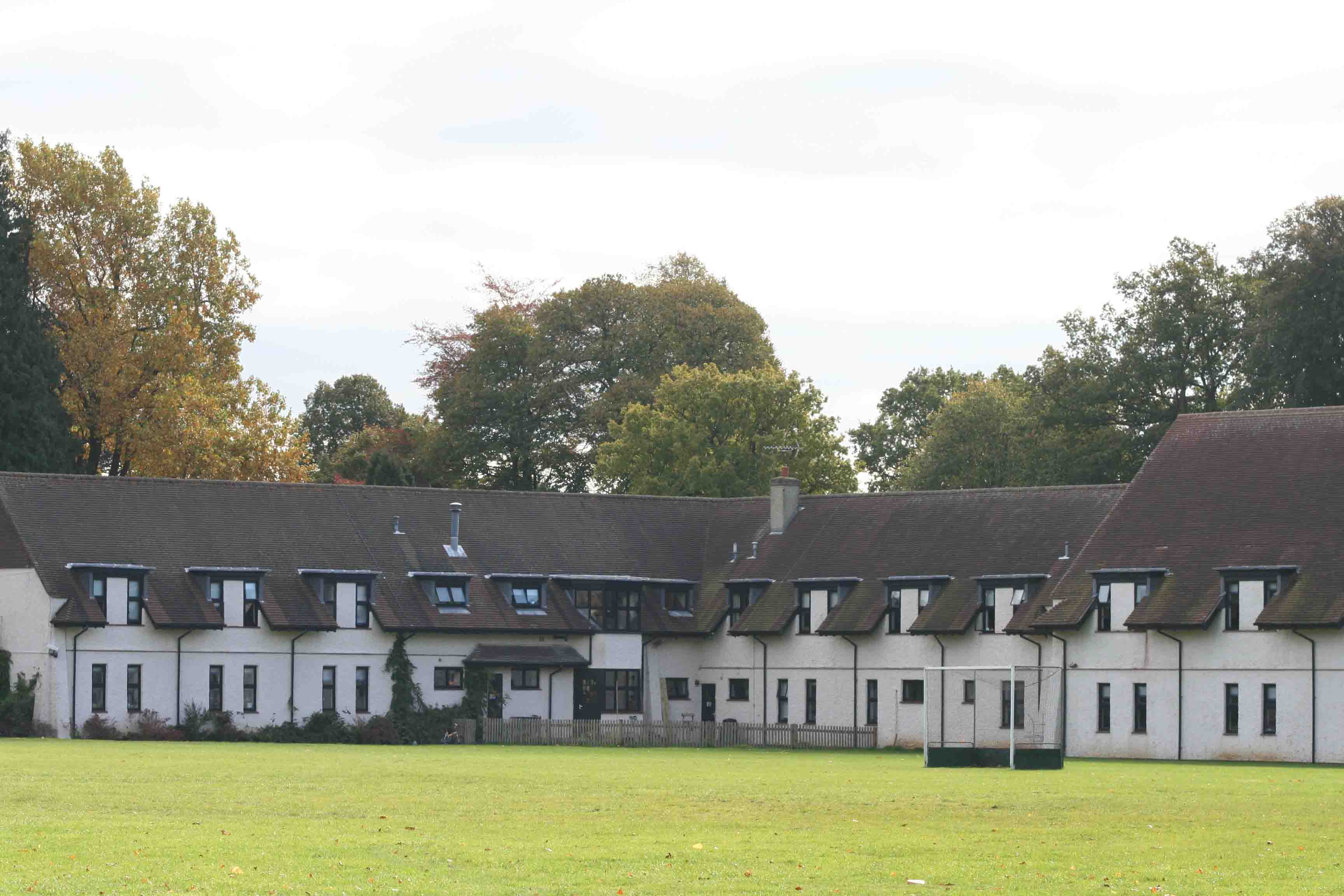
Prior's Field School

Prior's Field is an independent girls' boarding and day school in Guildford, Surrey in the south-east of England. Founded in 1902 by Julia Huxley, it stands in 42 acres of parkland, 34 miles south-west of London and adjacent to the A3 road, which runs between the capital and the south coast.

== History ==
Prior's Field School opened on 23 January 1902, with only seven pupils. It was founded by Julia Huxley, the mother of Julian Huxley and Aldous Huxley. Starting with a five-acre (2 ha) plot and a house designed by C.F.A. Voysey, Julia Huxley opened her school with one boarder, five day girls, a wire-haired terrier and her 7 1/2-year-old son, Aldous.

From its earliest days, the school encouraged a commitment to the suffragist cause. By the time of Julia Huxley's death in 1908, Prior's Field was a thriving and successful school and one which was already taking the subject of women's suffrage very seriously. The school magazines show that the girls were passionately involved in what was happening around them, and we know that "discussions on Women's suffrage" … " raged up and down the school" (Prior's Field Magazine, 1908).

The school motto, "We live by Admiration, Hope and Love," is from The Excursion by William Wordsworth. The school magazine first appeared in June 1908, by which time there were 85 pupils and 86 Old Girls.

Dying in 1908 at the age of 46, Julia Huxley was only for six years as Headmistress of Prior's Field. She was succeeded by Mrs Ethel Burton-Brown, who was Head from 1908 to 1927. Both Julia Huxley and Ethel Burton-Brown are buried in Compton Cemetery, the grave of the latter being designed by artist Mary Watts.

== Architecture ==
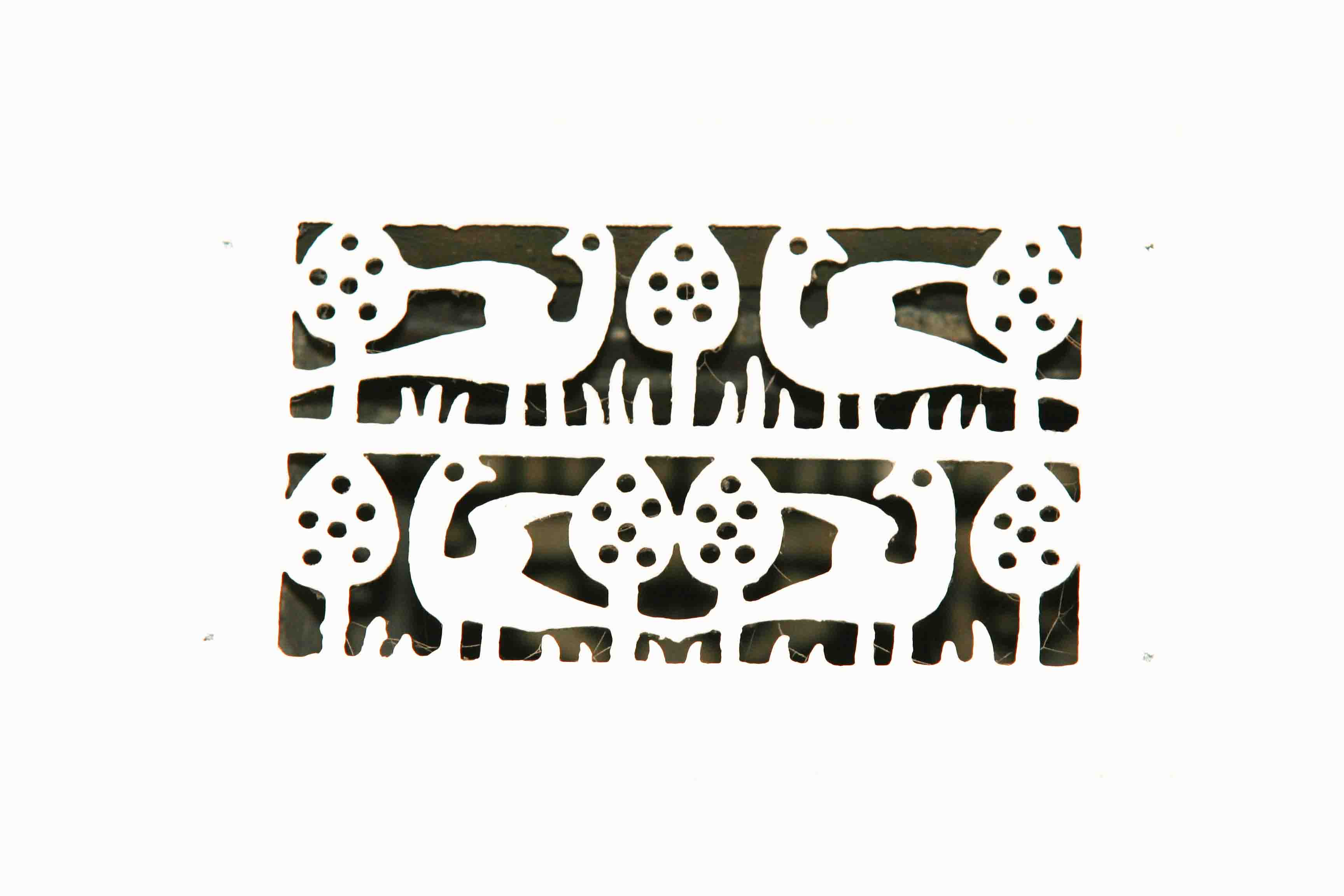
Voysey Air Vent depicting Birds and Trees Motif

Prior's Field, originally called Prior's Garth, was designed by prominent English Arts and Crafts movement architect C.F.A. Voysey. The house has been Grade II listed on the National Heritage List for England since May 1985.

Many of Voysey's original features – stylised keyholes, door handles, air vents, and fireplaces – can still be seen in the school today, for instance in the Oak Hall, the Senior Common Room and the Bursary offices. The additions to the original house – formerly known as Private Side – were designed by Voysey's pupil, Thomas Müntzer.

=== Nature and the outdoors: Gardens inspired by Gertrude Jekyll ===
The design of Prior's Field's rose garden was created by Leonard Huxley in collaboration with Gertrude Jekyll. It includes herbaceous borders, dry Bargate stone walls, a dipping pond and rock garden. In the early years, the care of the gardens was in the hands of lady gardeners trained at Swanley Horticultural College. The school has long encouraged an appreciation of the outdoors and remains involved with the scouting movement.

=== Prior's Field Centenary and 110th Anniversary ===
To mark the school's centenary in 2002, a £1.2 million sports hall was built. Designed in the style of Voysey and named the Centenary Sports Hall, it was opened by the physiologist and biophysicist Andrew Huxley, the recipient of the 1963 Nobel Prize in Physiology or Medicine and younger son of Leonard Huxley by his second marriage to Rosalind Bruce.

The 110th anniversary of Prior's Field's foundation was marked in 2012 by a service in Guildford Cathedral, construction of an all-weather sports pitch opened by the British Olympian hockey player Crista Cullen, and the annual Huxley Lecture in memory of the school's founder, delivered by the scientist and academic Susan Greenfield in November.

In September 2013, actress Diana Rigg opened a new three-storey teaching centre, siting the Creative Arts subjects in one area, providing six additional classrooms, a new school entrance and facilities for maths and modern languages.

In March 2017, the former Prior's Field Head Julie Roseblade opened a new Science, Technology and Music Centre, named the Arnold Building in memory of the school's founder, Julia Huxley.

== Notable alumnae ==
- Patricia Angadi (1914–2001), portrait painter and novelist
- Enid Bagnold (1889–1981), playwright and author of The Chalk Garden, National Velvet
- Jill Bennett (1931–1990), actress
- Alex Evans (born 1989), actress
- Victoria Hamilton (born 1971), actress
- Heather Joan Harvey (1899–1989), English writer and Liberal Party politician
- Lily James (born 1989), actress
- Anne Lupton (1888-1967) welfare and housing campaigner
- Freda Utley (1898–1978), writer and activist
- Mary Warnock, Baroness Warnock (born 1924), crossbench peer
- Margaret Yorke (1924–2012), crime writer, winner of the Crime Writers' Association Cartier Diamond Dagger Award, 1999
- Tessa Tennant (1959–2018), advocate of sustainable investment
- Tilly Smith (born 1994), credited with saving the lives of about 100 beachgoers at Maikhao Beach in Thailand

== Notable staff ==
- Jane Lunnon, later head of Wimbledon High School and Alleyn's School

== Admission ==
The main entry ages for Prior's Field are 11+, 13+ and 16+. Girls attend a Preview Day in October, when they undertake a series of activities and have an informal interview. They then sit an Entrance Exam in November. At 16+, entrance is dependent on GCSE results and the outcome of an interview.
