= Leonard Huxley (writer) =

British writer (1860–1933)

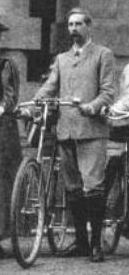
- At a party held by Mary Augusta Ward in 1896
- Born: 11 December 1860; London, England
- Died: 3 May 1933 (aged 72); Hampstead, London, England
- Citizenship: American
- Education: University College School; University of St Andrews; Balliol College, Oxford
- Occupation: Writer
- Spouse(s): Julia Arnold; Rosalind Bruce
- Children: 6, including Julian, Aldous and Andrew
- Parent(s): Thomas Henry Huxley and Henrietta Anne Heathorn
- Writing career
- Notable works: Life and Letters of Thomas Henry Huxley, Life and Letters of Sir Joseph Dalton Hooker OM GCSI, Thomas Henry Huxley: a character sketch

Leonard Huxley (11 December 1860 – 3 May 1933) was an English schoolteacher, writer and editor.

== Biography ==
=== Family ===
Huxley's father was the zoologist Thomas Henry Huxley, commonly referred to as "Darwin's bulldog", and his mother Henrietta Anne Heathorn. He was educated at University College School, London, the University of St Andrews, and Balliol College, Oxford. He first married Julia Arnold who founded a school. She was the daughter of the academic Tom Arnold. She was a sister of the novelist Mrs Humphry Ward, niece of the poet Matthew Arnold, and granddaughter of Thomas Arnold, the headmaster of Rugby School (immortalised as a character in Tom Brown's Schooldays).

Their four children included the biologist Julian Huxley (1887–1975) and the writer Aldous Huxley (1894–1963). Their middle son, Noel Trevenen (born in 1889), committed suicide in 1914. Their daughter, Margaret Arnold Huxley, was born in 1899. Julia Arnold died of cancer in 1908.

After the death of his first wife, Leonard married Rosalind Bruce, and had two further sons. The elder of these was David Bruce Huxley (1915–1992), whose daughter Angela married George Pember Darwin, son of the physicist Charles Galton Darwin. The younger was the 1963 Nobel Prize-winning physiologist Andrew Huxley (1917–2012).

Leonard Huxley died at his home in Hampstead on 3 May 1933.

=== Work ===
Huxley's major biographies were the three volumes of Life and Letters of Thomas Henry Huxley and the two volumes of Life and Letters of Sir Joseph Dalton Hooker OM GCSI. He also published Thomas Henry Huxley: a character sketch, and a short biography of Darwin. He was assistant master at Charterhouse School between 1884 and 1901. He was then the assistant editor of The Cornhill Magazine between 1901 and 1916, becoming its editor in 1916.

- 1900: Life and Letters of Thomas Henry Huxley. 2 vols.
- 1912: Thoughts on education drawn from the writings of Matthew Arnold (editor).
- 1913: Scott's last expedition (editor). 2 vols.
- 1918: Life and Letters of Sir Joseph Dalton Hooker OM, GCSI. 2 vols.
- 1920: Anniversaries, and other poems.
- 1920: Thomas Henry Huxley: a character sketch.
- 1920: Charles Darwin.
- 1924: Jane Welsh Carlyle: letters to her family 1839–1863 (editor).
- 1926: Progress and the unfit.
- 1926: Sheaves from the Cornhill.
- 1930: Elizabeth Barrett Browning: letters to her sister 1846–1859 (editor).
