= Matthew Huxley =

American epidemiologist, anthropologist, educator and author (1920–2005)

- Born: 19 April 1920; London
- Died: 10 February 2005 (aged 84); Reading, Pennsylvania
- Occupations: Epidemiologist; Anthropologist
- Spouses: Ellen Hovde (m. 1950; div. 1961) Judith Wallet Bordage (m. 1963; died 1983) Franziska Reed (m. 1986)
- Children: 2

Matthew Huxley (19 April 1920 – 10 February 2005) was a British-American epidemiologist and anthropologist, as well as an educator and author. His work ranged from promoting universal health care to establishing standards of care for nursing home patients and the mentally ill to investigating the question of what is a socially sanctionable drug.

== Background ==
Huxley was born in London as the son of British author Aldous Huxley and his Belgian wife Maria Nys. He was educated at Dartington Hall School in Devon.

Resettling in the United States with his father in 1937, Huxley attended the Fountain Valley School of Colorado and graduated from the University of California at Berkeley. He received a master's degree in public health from Harvard University. He worked for the Milbank Memorial Fund, a New York-based foundation, and from 1963 to 1983, with a brief intermission, worked at the National Institute of Mental Health in Washington. In 1968, he briefly served as director of seminars at the Smithsonian Institution.

In April 1950 Huxley married Ellen Hovde, a documentary filmmaker. The couple had two children, Trevenen Huxley (b. 20 October 1951) and Tessa Huxley (b. October 1953), and divorced in 1961. On 22 March 1963 he wed Judith Wallet Bordage, a freelance writer and food columnist at the Washington Post; she died in 1983. He then married Franziska Reed in 1986, who survived him.

Huxley died of cardiac shock in Reading, Pennsylvania, in February 2005 at the age of 84.

== Publications ==
- Huxley, Matthew; Capa, Cornell (1965). Farewell to Eden. London: Chatto & Windus. OCLC 318362239.

Interdisciplinary Science reviews Vol 1 "2 The Criteria for a socially acceptable Drug
