= 1896 in literature =

This article contains information about the literary events and publications of 1896.

== Events ==
An early poster for The Grand Duke

- February 11 – While Oscar Wilde is in prison, his play Salome (written in 1891) is premièred in its original French by Lugné-Poe's Théâtre de l'Œuvre company in Paris, perhaps at the Comédie-Parisienne.
- March – Stephanus Jacobus du Toit's Die Koningin van Skeba, the first Afrikaans language novel, begins serialization in Ons Klyntji.
- March 3 – Publication begins of the world's first magazine with an orientation to male homosexuality, Der Eigene, by Adolf Brand in Berlin.
- March 7 – Gilbert & Sullivan's last operetta The Grand Duke is premièred in London at the Savoy Theatre.
- July 7 – Charles Thomas Wooldridge is hanged at Reading Gaol in England for uxoricide, inspiring fellow-prisoner C.3.3. Oscar Wilde's The Ballad of Reading Gaol (1897).
- October 10 – The New York Times publishes its first book review section, which evolves to become The New York Times Book Review.
- October 17 – Anton Chekhov's play The Seagull (Чайка, Chayka) is unsuccessfully premièred at the Alexandrinsky Theatre in Saint Petersburg (Russia).
- November – The British magazine The Lady's Realm is first published, edited by William Henry Wilkins.
- December – Frank Munsey's The Argosy publishes its first all adult fiction issue, pioneering the pulp magazine genre in the United States.
- December 5 – Connemara Public Library opens in Madras.
- December 10 – Alfred Jarry's play Ubu Roi (first published this Spring in Le Livre d'art) is premièred by the Théâtre de l'Œuvre in Paris. The opening word, "Merdre!", triggers disturbances and the play is not performed again in the author's lifetime.
- unknown dates
  - The final volume of Theodore Roosevelt's The Winning of the West is published.
  - Bernard Grenfell and Arthur Hunt of Queen's College, Oxford, begin excavation at Oxyrhynchus in Egypt and discover the Oxyrhynchus Papyri.
  - The English twins Agnes S. Lewis and Margaret D. Gibson bring the treasures of the Cairo Geniza to the attention of Western scholars, notably the first Hebrew-language text of the book of Ecclesiastes known in modern times.
  - The Publishers Association is established in the United Kingdom as a trade association.
  - The Cheltenham typeface is designed by architect Bertram Goodhue and Ingalls Kimball, director of the Cheltenham Press in New York.

== New books ==
=== Fiction ===
- Herman Bang – Ludvigsbakke
- Max Beerbohm – The Works of Max Beerbohm
- René Boylesve – Le Médecin des dames de Néans
- Frances Hodgson Burnett – A Lady of Quality
- Abraham Cahan – Yekl: A Tale of the New York Ghetto
- Hall Caine – Jan the Icelander or Home, Sweet Home, A Lecture Story
- Joseph Conrad – An Outcast of the Islands
- Marie Corelli
  - The Mighty Atom
  - The Murder of Delicia
  - Ziska
- Machado de Assis – Várias histórias (short story collection)
- Isabelle Eberhardt as Nicolas Podolinsky – "Per fas et nefas" (short story)
- Edouard Estaunie – L'Empreinte
- Jane Findlater – The Green Graves of Balgowrie
- Antonio Fogazzaro – The Patriot
- Theodor Fontane – Effi Briest (in book form)
- Harold Frederic – The Damnation of Theron Ware
- Mary E. Wilkins Freeman – Madelon
- Jules Girardin – Les aventures de M. Colin-Tampon
- Karl Adolph Gjellerup – Møllen (The Mill)
- Higuchi Ichiyō (樋口 一葉) – Takekurabe (Comparing Heights, translated as Child's Play)
- W. W. Jacobs – Many Cargoes (short stories)
- Henry James – The Figure in the Carpet
- Sarah Orne Jewett – The Country of the Pointed Firs
- Olha Kobylianska – Arystokratka
- "The Lord Commissioner" (John McCoy) – A Prophetic Romance: Mars to Earth
- Pierre Louÿs – Aphrodite: mœurs antiques
- William Morris – The Well at the World's End
- Arthur Morrison – A Child of the Jago
- Bolesław Prus – Pharaoh (Faraon; serialization concludes)
- Antal Stašek – Blouznivci našich hor
- Robert Louis Stevenson (died 1894) – Weir of Hermiston (unfinished)
- Mark Twain – Tom Sawyer, Detective
- Paul Valéry – La Soirée avec M. Teste
- Jules Verne
  - Facing the Flag (Face au drapeau)
  - Clovis Dardentor
- Mary Augusta Ward – Sir George Tressady
- H. G. Wells – The Island of Doctor Moreau
- Owen Wister – Red Men and White
- Émile Zola – Rome

=== Children and young people ===
- R. D. Blackmore – Tales from the Telling House
- Christabel R. Coleridge – Minstrel Dick. A Tale of the XIVth Century
- Mary Catherine Judd – Classic Myths
- K. Langloh Parker – Australian Legendary Tales

=== Drama ===
- George Ade – Artie
- Anton Chekhov – The Seagull
- Georges Feydeau – Le Dindon
- Henrik Ibsen – John Gabriel Borkman
- Alfred Jarry – Ubu Roi
- Maurice Maeterlinck – Aglavaine et Sélysette

=== Poetry ===
- Hilaire Belloc
  - The Bad Child's Book of Beasts
  - Verses and Sonnets
- Richard Dehmel – Weib und Welt
- Paul Laurence Dunbar – Lyrics of Lowly Life, Majors and Minors and "We Wear the Mask"
- A. E. Housman – A Shropshire Lad
- Robert Louis Stevenson (died 1894) – Songs of Travel, and Other Verses
- See also 1896 in poetry

=== Non-fiction ===
- Lewis Richard Farnell – The Cults of the Greek States
- Edward Ernest Green – The Coccidae of Ceylon
- Theodor Herzl – Der Judenstaat (The Jewish State)
- George Holyoake – The Origin and Nature of Secularism
- MacGibbon and Ross - The Ecclesiastical Architecture of Scotland
- Charles Monroe Sheldon – In His Steps: 'What Would Jesus Do?'
- Charles Dudley Warner – A Library of the World's Best Literature
- Andrew Dickson White – A History of the Warfare of Science with Theology in Christendom

== Births ==
- January 7 – Arnold Ridley, English dramatist and actor (died 1984)
- January 9 – Eleanor Graham, English children's writer and editor (died 1984)
- January 12 – Nobuko Yoshiya, Japanese romantic novelist (died 1973)
- January 14 – John Dos Passos, American novelist (died 1970)
- January 21 – Guy Gilpatric, American short story writer (suicide 1950)
- February 12 – Dorothy Frooks, American author and publisher (died 1997)
- February 18 – André Breton, French Surrealist poet and author (died 1966)
- March 1 – Moriz Seeler, German writer, poet, film producer and man of the theatre (died 1942)
- March 10 – Nancy Cunard, English patron of the arts (died 1965)
- March 22 – Sigge Stark, born Signe Petersén, Swedish writer (died 1964)
- April 16 – Tristan Tzara, Romanian-French poet and essayist (died 1963)
- April 23 – Margaret Kennedy, English novelist and playwright (died 1967)
- May 1 – Mihai Ralea, Romanian critic and sociologist of literature (died 1964)
- May 3 – Dodie Smith, English novelist and dramatist (died 1990)
- May 9 – Austin Clarke, Irish poet, playwright and novelist (died 1974)
- May 27 – Joanna Cannan, English writer of children's pony books and detective novels (died 1961)
- June 6 – R. C. Sherriff, English dramatist (died 1975)
- June 18 – Philip Barry, American playwright (died 1949)
- July 4 – Mao Dun, Chinese novelist, cultural critic, and Minister of Culture (died 1981)
- July 19 – A. J. Cronin, Scottish novelist (died 1981)
- July 25 – Josephine Tey, Scottish crime writer (died 1952)
- August 27 – Kenji Miyazawa, Japanese poet (died 1933)
- August 28 – Liam O'Flaherty, Irish novelist and short-story writer (died 1984)
- September 4 – Antonin Artaud, French theatre director (died 1948)
- September 5 – Heimito von Doderer, Austrian author (died 1966)
- September 22 – Uri Zvi Grinberg, Austro-Hungarian-born Israeli poet writing in Yiddish and Hebrew (died 1981)
- September 24 – F. Scott Fitzgerald, American writer (died 1940)
- October 11 – Roman Jakobson, Russian linguistic theorist (died 1982)
- October 22 – José Leitão de Barros, Portuguese playwright and film director (died 1967)
- October 30 – Ruth Gordon, American actress and screenwriter (died 1985)
- November 1 – Lawrence Riley, American playwright and screenwriter (died 1974)
- November 4 – J. R. Ackerley, English literary editor (died 1967)
- December 23 – Giuseppe Tomasi di Lampedusa, Italian novelist (died 1957)
- December 27 – Carl Zuckmayer, German writer and playwright (died 1977)
- December – Sandu Tudor, Romanian poet, journalist and theologian (died 1962)
- unknown date – Edith Ditmas, English archivist, historian and writer (died 1986)

== Deaths ==
- January 6 – Thomas W. Knox, American journalist and author, journalist (born 1835)
- January 8 – Paul Verlaine, French poet (born 1844)
- January 17 – Lady Llanover, Welsh writer and patron of the arts (born 1802)
- January 20 – Graciano López Jaena, Filipino journalist, writer and patriot (born 1856)
- February 26 – Arsène Houssaye, French novelist, poet and man of letters (born 1815)
- March 21 – Elizabeth Otis Dannelly, American poet (born 1838)
- March 22 – Ludwig Laistner, German novelist, mythologist and literary historian (born 1845)
- May 11 – Henry Cuyler Bunner, American novelist and poet (born 1855)
- May 13 – Nora Perry, American poet, journalist and children's author (born 1831)
- June 8 – Jules Simon, French philosopher (born 1814)
- June 22 – Sir Augustus Harris, French-born English dramatist and theater manager (born 1852)
- July 1 – Harriet Beecher Stowe, American novelist (born 1811)
- July 11 – Ernst Curtius, German historian (born 1814)
- July 16 – Edmond de Goncourt, French critic and founder of Prix Goncourt (born 1822)
- July 23 – Mary Dickens, English memoirist, editor and novelist (born 1838)
- August 17 – Mary Abigail Dodge (Gail Hamilton), American essayist (born 1833)
- September 23 – Ivar Aasen, Norwegian philologist, lexicographer, playwright, and poet (born 1813)
- October 3 – William Morris, English poet, novelist and designer (born 1834)
- October 8 – George du Maurier, English cartoonist and novelist (born 1834)
- November 23 – Ichiyō Higuchi, Japanese writer (born 1872)
- November 26
  - Mathilde Blind, German-born English poet (born 1841)
  - Coventry Patmore, English poet (born 1823)
- December 10 – Alfred Nobel, Swedish founder of the Nobel prizes (born 1833)
