= Norway, the Northern Playground =

1904 book on mountaineering

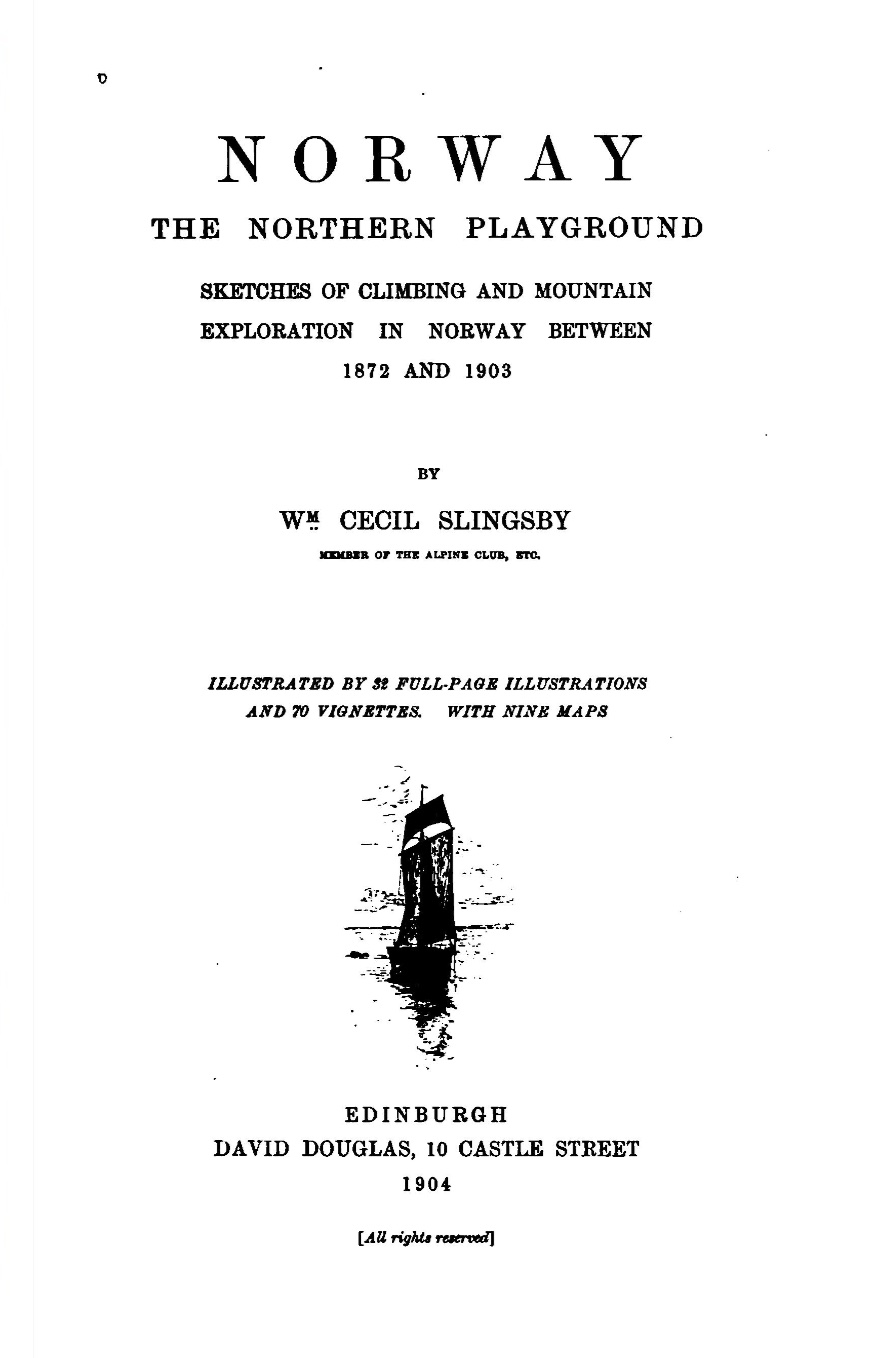
- Author: William Cecil Slingsby
- Language: English
- Publisher: David Douglas
- Publication date: 1904

Norway, the Northern Playground: Sketches of Climbing and Mountain Exploration in Norway between 1872 and 1903 is a 1904 book on mountaineering in Norway by British mountaineer William Cecil Slingsby. The book tells the story of the first ascents of many of the most challenging peaks in Norway and contributed greatly to popularizing mountaineering in Norway—particularly in Jotunheimen—among the international and especially British mountaineering community, which had thus far largely focused on the Alps. It was published in Edinburgh by Scottish publisher David Douglas in 1904, with 425 pages, 32 full page illustrations, 9 maps and 70 vignettes. A second revised edition was published in 1941, edited by Slingsby's daughter Eleanor Winthrop Young (née Slingsby) and with a short biography of William Cecil Slingsby authored by Geoffrey Winthrop Young.

Slingsby first visited Norway in 1872 and fell in love with the country. He has been called the discoverer of the Norwegian mountains, and the father of Norwegian mountaineering (insofar as he seems to be the first who actively pursued climbing in Norway and was the first person on several mountains). Mountaineering historian Jill Neate noted in 1986 that "Slingsby was one of the leading climbers of his generation, climbing in Britain and the Alps, but he is still revered in Norway as the 'Father' of Norwegian mountaineering. His book remains the classic, indispensable work on the region."

== Bibliography ==
- William Cecil Slingsby (1904), Norway, the Northern Playground: Sketches of Climbing and Mountain Exploration in Norway between 1872 and 1903. Edinburgh: David Douglas. First edition.
- William Cecil Slingsby (1941), Norway, the Northern Playground. Oxford: Blackwell. Second edition, edited by Eleanor Slingsby and with a biography of W. Cecil Slingsby by Geoffrey Winthrop Young. Issue 7 of Blackwell's mountaineering library.
- William Cecil Slingsby (1998), Norge, den nordlige arena: skisser fra tindebestigninger og oppdagerferder i norsk natur mellom 1872 og 1921. Oslo: Grøndahl Dreyer. ISBN 8250420764. Norwegian translation.
