= Marcella (novel) =

1894 novel by Mary Augusta Ward

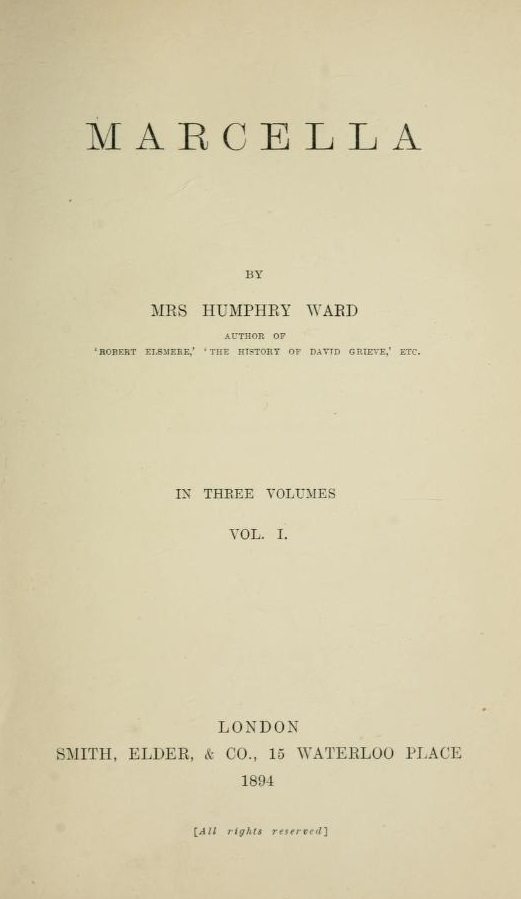
- Title page of the first edition.
- Author: Mary Augusta Ward
- Language: English
- Publisher: Smith, Elder & Co.
- Publication date: 1894
- Publication place: England

Marcella is a novel by Mary Augusta Ward, first published in 1894.

== Background ==
The novel was inspired by the Ward family's move to Stocks House in the Summer of 1892. Stocks House was the home of Mary Ward and her husband Humphry from 1892 to 1922, and was a large Georgian manor house in the village of Aldbury in Hertfordshire. The sudden shift from suburban to rural life proved to be quite a shock, especially as they were forced to confront the rise in criminality due to the agricultural depression of the mid-1890s. Soon after her initial visit to Stocks House, she wrote a preliminary outline of Marcella on half a piece of paper, heavily drawing on her experiences moving to the countryside.

Harry Wharton, the socialist who is revealed to have a corrupt personal life, is believed to be partially based on Charles Stewart Parnell.

== Synopsis ==
Marcella Boyce is a young woman living in the Bohemian circles of London. A passionate member of the Fabian Society, she is forced to act as a lady when she moves into Mellor, a house in the country. There, she meets Aldous Raeburn, the future Lord Maxwell, a devout conservative who falls in love with Marcella. The two become engaged; Marcella, however, is scornful of the aristocracy, particularly their laws around poaching. She befriends the destitute Hurd family, whose youngest, Willie Hurd, is dying of consumption. When his father Jim is caught poaching trying to feed his family, an unfortunate encounter leads to him murdering a gamekeeper on Lord Maxwell's estate.

Marcella fiercely defends Hurd, seeing him as a victim of circumstance; unfortunately, at the trial he is still sentenced. These events cause the relationship between Marcella and Aldous to become strained, and the wedding is eventually cancelled. Marcella instead falls for Harry Wharton, a rich socialist who owns a newspaper championing the working class.

The third volume opens after some time has passed. Marcella is now working in the London slums as a nurse. Harry Wharton and Aldous Raeburn, meanwhile, have become Members of Parliament for opposing political parties. Wharton, however, is revealed to be a gambler, seducer, and class traitor, who is bribed by steel magnates to oppose a strike. Marcella, disillusioned by the apparent failure of abstract socialism, chooses to marry Aldous Raeburn.

== Influence ==
Marcella, under the name Lady Maxwell, would go on to have a supporting role in the Mrs Humphry Ward novel Sir George Tressady.

The eponymous heroine is the Marcella that Miss Adeline Glendower, the elder of the Glendower half-sisters, aspires to be in The Sea Lady, a social satire by H. G. Wells.
