= 1899 in the United Kingdom =

Events from the year 1899 in the United Kingdom.

== Incumbents ==
- Monarch – Victoria
- Prime Minister – Robert Gascoyne-Cecil, 3rd Marquess of Salisbury (Coalition)

== Events ==
- 6 January – Lord Curzon becomes Viceroy of India. Aylesbury by-election.
- 7 January – The Lucky Star, an English comic opera composed by Ivan Caryll and produced by the D'Oyly Carte Opera Company premieres at the Savoy Theatre in London for the first of 143 performances.
- 12–13 January – the Lynmouth life-boat Louisa is launched from Porlock Weir, entailing being hauled overland for 15 miles (24 km) with a climb of 1,423 feet (434 m) across Exmoor using 100 volunteers to save all 18 crew of the Forrest Hall in the Bristol Channel.
- 25 February – in an accident at Grove Hill, Harrow, Edwin Sewell becomes the world's first driver of a petrol-driven vehicle to be killed; his passenger, Maj. James Richer, dies of injuries three days later.
- 9 March – Charles C. Wakefield begins the lubricating oil company which will become Castrol.
- 11 March – the world's first wireless distress signal is sent to the East Goodwin light vessel when German cargo-carrying barquentine Elbe runs aground in fog on Goodwin Sands off the Kent coast, bringing assistance from Ramsgate Lifeboat Station.
- 25 March – The rowing crew of Cambridge University wins the annual boat race against Oxford University for the first time in a decade. Oxford had won the race in nine consecutive seasons (1890 to 1898).
- 27 March – Guglielmo Marconi successfully transmits a radio signal across the English Channel.
- 18 April – The Local Government (Ireland) Act 1898 goes into effect, creating 32 counties of Ireland (six which would become Northern Ireland) and abolishes the counties corporate of Carrickfergus and Drogheda.
- 1 May – the National Trust acquires its first part of Wicken Fen, making it the UK's oldest wetland nature reserve.
- 17 May – foundation stone of the Victoria and Albert Museum in London is laid by Queen Victoria, her last public engagement – a week before her 80th birthday. Now in the 62nd year of her reign, she is Britain's longest-serving monarch up to this time.
- 24 May – the 80th birthday of Queen Victoria is celebrated throughout the British Empire.
- 26 May – the guns of the British warship HMS Scylla, commanded by Captain Percy Scott, hit their targets 56 out of 70 times after Scott and his crew solve the problem of aiming a ship cannon on rolling seas.
- 19 June – Edward Elgar's Enigma Variations (Variations on an Original Theme, Op. 36) are premiered at St James's Hall in London conducted by Hans Richter; the work rapidly attracts international acclaim.
- 22–27 June – the highest ever recorded cricket score, 628 not out, is made by schoolboy A. E. J. Collins.
- 9 August – royal assent for:
  - Board of Education Act 1899, establishing the Board of Education.
  - Elementary Education (Defective and Epileptic Children) Act, empowering school authorities to identify and make appropriate educational provision for 'defective' children.
  - Seats for Shop Assistants Act 1899, providing, for the first time, a respite for workers required to remain standing for long periods of time.
- 21 August – Sir Edmund Antrobus, owner of the land on Salisbury Plain upon which Stonehenge stands in England, offers to sell the land to the British government for £125,000. After Sir Edmund's death in 1915, his brother Cosmo will have the land auctioned for £6,600.
- September – the British Mutoscope and Biograph Company makes King John (a very short silent film) in London, the first known film based on a Shakespeare play.
- 6 September
  - White Star Line's transatlantic ocean liner RMS Oceanic sails on her maiden voyage out of Liverpool. At 17,272 gross register tons and 704 ft (215 m), she is the largest ship afloat, following scrapping of the SS Great Eastern a decade earlier.
  - Flying Fox completes the English Triple Crown by finishing first in the 2,000 Guineas, Epsom Derby and St Leger.
- 24 September – A crowd of several thousand men in London disrupts an anti-war demonstration in Trafalgar Square and shouts down the Peace Association speakers as well as hurling "decayed apples and eggs and other missiles."
- 6 October – The War Office alerts the administrators of British Army Reserve to prepare for drafting of soldiers in preparation for war in South Africa.
- 9 October – first motor bus in London.
- 11 October – Second Boer War begins: In South Africa, a war between the United Kingdom and the Boers of the Transvaal and Orange Free State, erupts.
- 13 October – Second Boer War: Siege of Mafeking begins.
- 16 October – A Chinese Honeymoon, the first musical to run for more than 1,000 performances, is performed for the first time, making its debut at the Theatre Royal in Hanley, Staffordshire before moving to London.
- 20 October – Second Boer War: Battle of Talana Hill – In the first major clash of the conflict, near Dundee, Natal, the British Army drives the Boers from their position, but with heavy casualties, including the commanding general Sir Penn Symons.
- 27 October – Louise Masset, an unmarried mother, murders her 3-year old son in a bathroom at the Dalston Junction railway station in London. She will be found guilty on 18 December and hanged at Newgate Prison three weeks later.
- 31 October – The House of Commons unveils the statue of Oliver Cromwell.
- 13 November – Bede (died 735) is declared a Doctor of the Church by Pope Leo XIII, the only Englishman so named.
- 15 November – the American Line's SS St. Paul becomes the first ocean liner to report her imminent arrival by wireless telegraphy when Marconi's station at The Needles contacts her 66 nautical miles off the coast of England.
- 20 November – Germany's Kaiser Wilhelm II and his family arrive in London at the invitation of Queen Victoria's government and are greeted by cheering crowds.
- 24 November – Mahdist War: Decisive British and Egyptian victory at the Battle of Umm Diwaykarat ends the war in Sudan.
- 30 November – The Secretary of State for the Colonies, Joseph Chamberlain, makes a controversial speech at Leicester proposing "a new Triple Alliance between the Teutonic race and the two great trans-Atlantic branches of the Anglo-Saxon race which would become a potent influence on the future of the world."
- 8 December – the Aldeburgh life-boat capsizes on service: seven of the eighteen crew are killed.
- 15 December – Glasgow School of Art opens its new building, the most notable work of Charles Rennie Mackintosh.
- 23 December – Sir Reginald Wingate is appointed as the new British Governor-General of Anglo-Egyptian Sudan.

=== Summer ===
- The year was notable for its hot summer – the Central England Temperature saw its 4th hottest summer since 1659 and the hottest since 1868, as of this year. There is also a drought, leading to the 8th driest summer on record at this date. Elsewhere in the UK records were also set, notably a record hot summer for Sutherland, as of 2025. The heat also extended over parts of Europe.

=== Undated ===
- Raising of school leaving age in England and Wales to twelve.
- Liquorice allsorts first marketed by Bassetts of Sheffield.
- Oxo beef stock cubes introduced by Liebig's Extract of Meat Company.

== Publications ==
- Joseph Conrad's novella Heart of Darkness (three-part serial format).
- E. W. Hornung's first A. J. Raffles novel The Amateur Cracksman.
- Rudyard Kipling's poem "The White Man's Burden" and his school stories Stalky & Co.
- E. Nesbit's children's novel The Story of the Treasure Seekers.
- Clarence Rook's allegedly documentary The Hooligan Nights; Being the Life and Opinions of a Young and Impertinent Criminal Recounted by Himself.
- Somerville and Ross's stories Some Experiences of an Irish R.M. (collected in book form).

== Births ==
- 1 January – Jack Beresford, rower (died 1977)
- 11 January – Eva Le Gallienne, actress (died 1991)
- 17 January – Nevil Shute (Norway), novelist (died 1960 in Australia)
- 21 January – John Bodkin Adams, doctor and suspected serial killer (died 1983)
- 23 January – Tom Denning, Baron Denning, judge (died 1999)
- 24 January – Thomas Woodrooffe, naval officer and radio commentator (died 1978)
- 3 February – Doris Speed, actress (died 1994)
- 18 February – Arthur Bryant, historian (died 1985)
- 21 February – Sir Donald Hardman, Royal Air Force commander (died 1982)
- 13 March – William Lovelock, composer (died 1986)
- 18 March – Marjorie Abbatt, toy-maker and businesswoman (died 1991)
- 30 March – Cyril Radcliffe, lawyer and public servant (died 1977)
- 2 April – Robin Hill, biochemist (died 1991)
- 26 April – Sir John Nicoll, governor of Singapore (died 1981)
- 6 May – Billy Cotton, bandleader and singer (died 1969)
- 18 May – Ronald Armstrong-Jones, barrister (died 1966)
- 22 May – Binnie Hale, musical theatre performer (died 1984)
- 25 May – Kitty Harris, spy for the Soviet Union (died 1966)
- 26 May – Ruth Bird, historian and schoolteacher (died 1987)
- 1 June – Edward Charles Titchmarsh, mathematician (died 1963)
- 7 June – Elizabeth Bowen, Anglo-Irish novelist (died 1973)
- 18 June – John Warburton, actor (died 1981)
- 29 June – Edward Twining, diplomat, Governor of North Borneo and of Tanganyika (died 1967)
- 1 July – Charles Laughton, actor (died 1962)
- 13 August – Alfred Hitchcock, film director (died 1980)
- 27 August – C. S. Forester, novelist (died 1966)
- 24 September – Bessie Braddock, born Elizabeth Bamber, Labour politician (died 1970)
- 29 September – Billy Butlin, holiday camp pioneer (born in South Africa; died 1980)
- 3 November
  - Ralph Bates, writer (died 2000)
  - Pauline Johnson, born Katherine Johnson, silent film actress (died 1947)
- 22 November – Philip Mayne, Army officer (died 2007)
- 2 December
  - John Barbirolli, orchestral conductor (died 1970)
  - John Cobb, racing car and motorboat driver (died 1952)
- 8 December – Arthur Leslie, television actor (died 1970)
- 9 December – Maurice Yonge, marine zoologist (died 1986)
- 15 December – Harold Abrahams, athlete (died 1978)
- 16 December – Noël Coward, actor, playwright and composer (died 1973)

== Deaths ==
- 30 January – Harry Bates, sculptor (born 1850)
- 6 February – Alfred, Hereditary Prince of Saxe-Coburg and Gotha (Prince Alfred of Edinburgh), a grandson of Queen Victoria, in Austria (born 1874)
- 27 March – Myles Birket Foster, illustrator and watercolour painter (born 1825)
- 1 April – John Ferguson Nisbet, Scottish journalist and writer (born 1851)
- 24 May – William Brett, 1st Viscount Esher, law lord (born 1817)
- 5 June – Margaret Anna Cusack, religious sister (born 1829 in Ireland)
- 9 August – Edward Frankland, chemist (born 1825)
- 26 August – Walter Simon Andrews, policeman (Whitechapel murders) (born 1847)
- 2 September – Ernest Renshaw, tennis player (born 1861)
- 2 October
  - Emma Hardinge Britten, spiritualist (born 1823)
  - Percy Pilcher, aviation pioneer and glider pilot (born 1866)
- 30 October – Arthur Blomfield, ecclesiastical architect (born 1829)
- 2 November – Anna Swanwick, feminist writer (born 1813)
- 20 November – Georgina Gascoyne-Cecil, Marchioness of Salisbury, political hostess (born 1827)
- 23 November – Thomas Henry Ismay, shipowner (White Star Line) (born 1837)
- 5 December – Sir Henry Tate, sugar magnate (born 1819)

== See also ==
- List of British films before 1920
