= The Ecclesiastical Architecture of Scotland =

Book series by MacGibbon and Ross

The Ecclesiastical Architecture of Scotland from the Earliest Christian Times to the Seventeenth Century
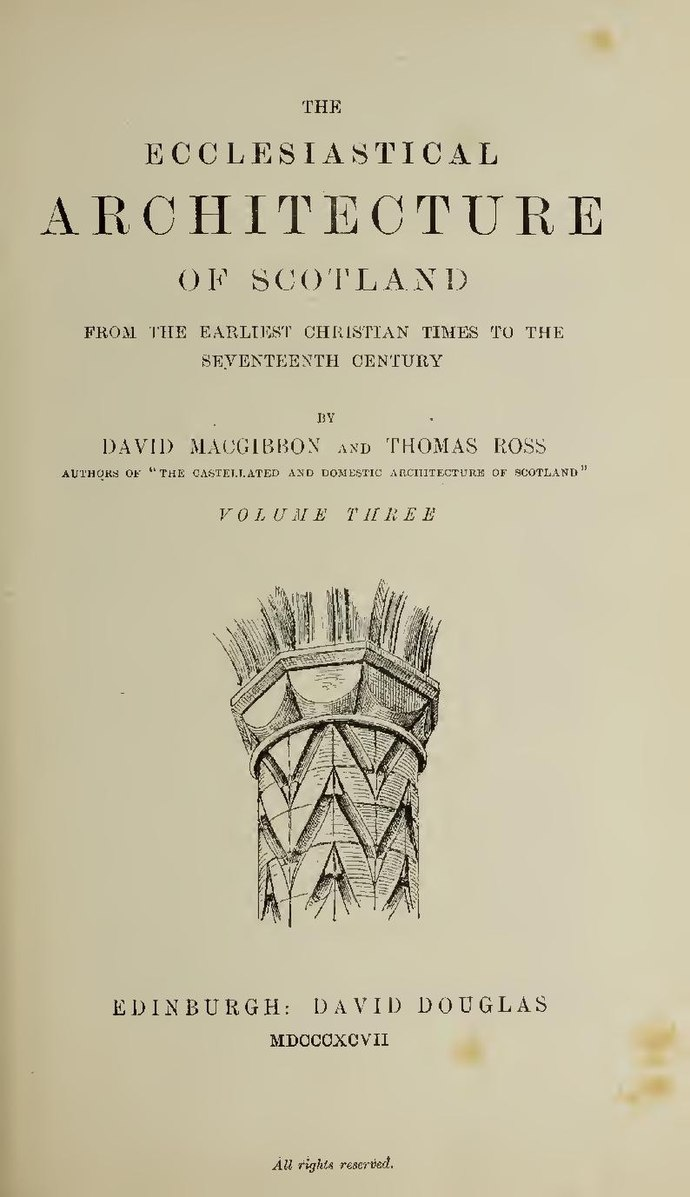
- Title page of volume three
- Author: David MacGibbon and Thomas Ross
- Language: English
- Publisher: George Waterston & Sons, David Douglas
- Publication date: 1896-1897
- Publication place: Scotland

The Ecclesiastical Architecture of Scotland from the Earliest Christian Times to the Seventeenth Century is a book that was published in 3 volumes in 1896-1897 by Scottish architects David MacGibbon and Thomas Ross.

The book has the same premise as The Castellated and Domestic Architecture of Scotland except with ecclesiastical buildings such as churches, chapels and cathedrals instead of castles.

== Gallery ==
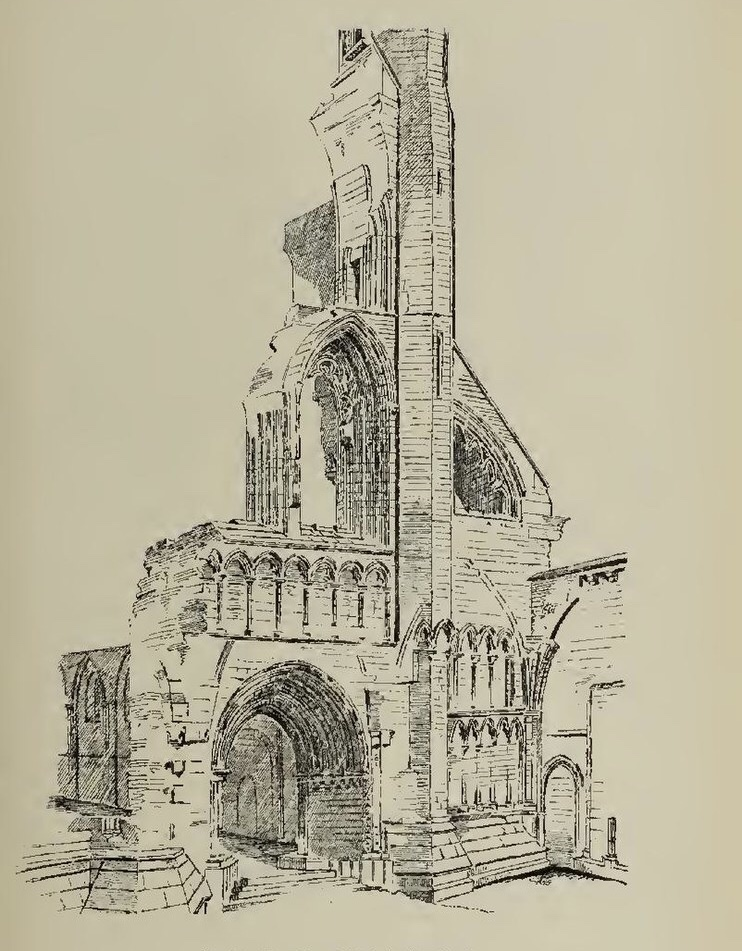

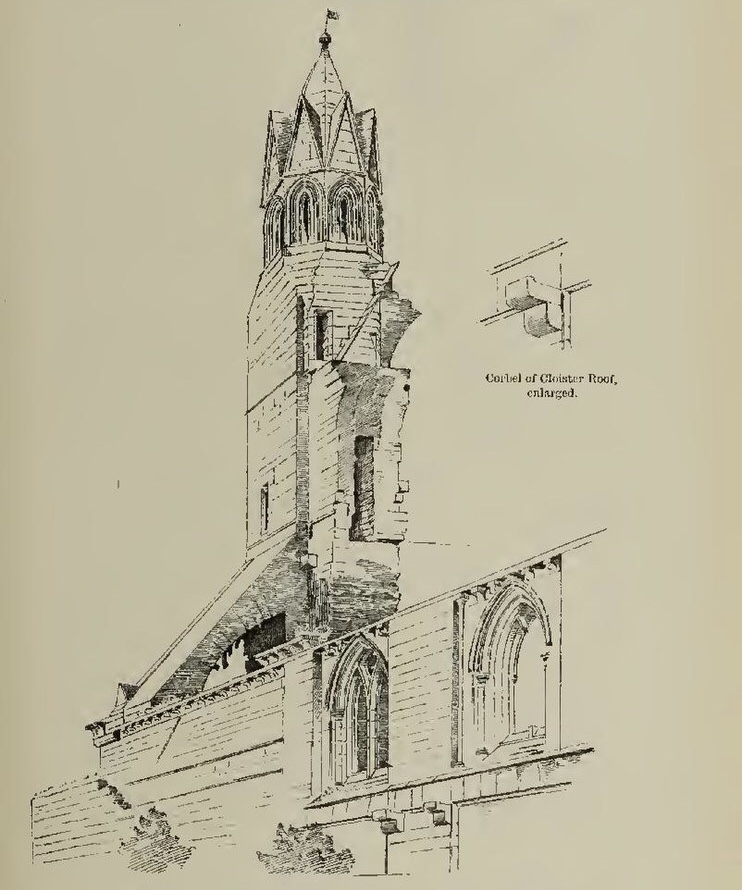

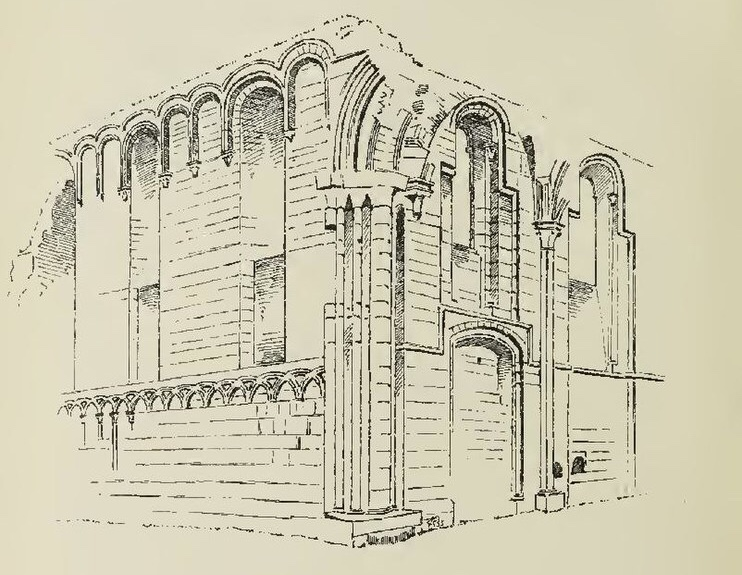

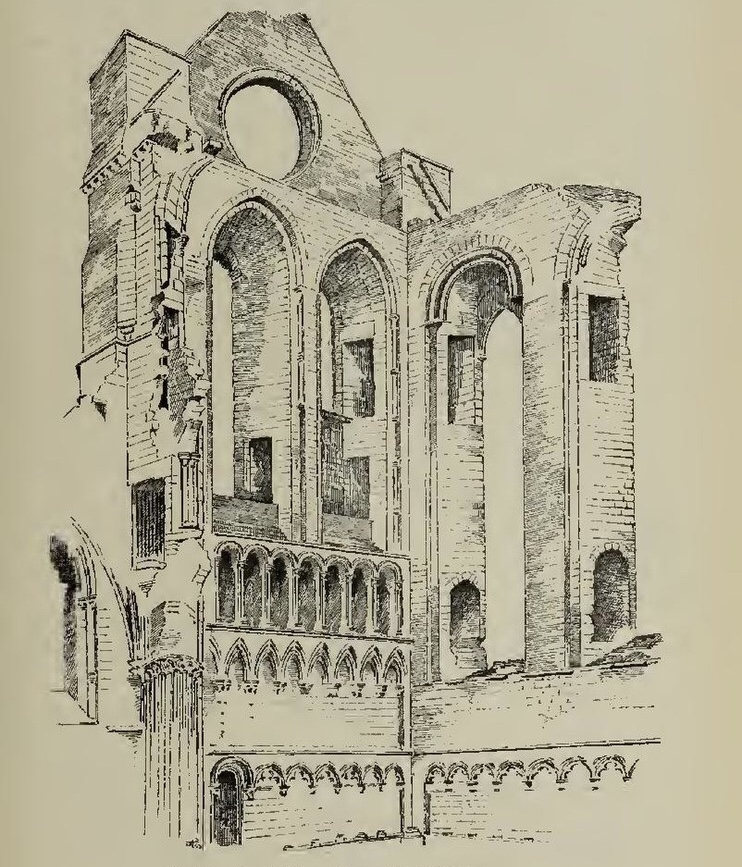

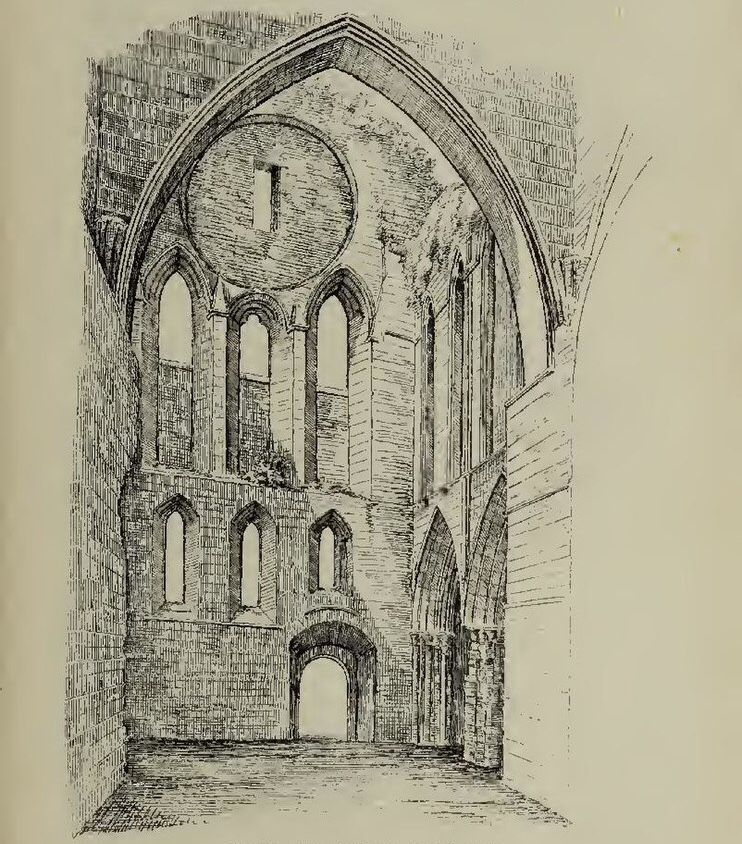

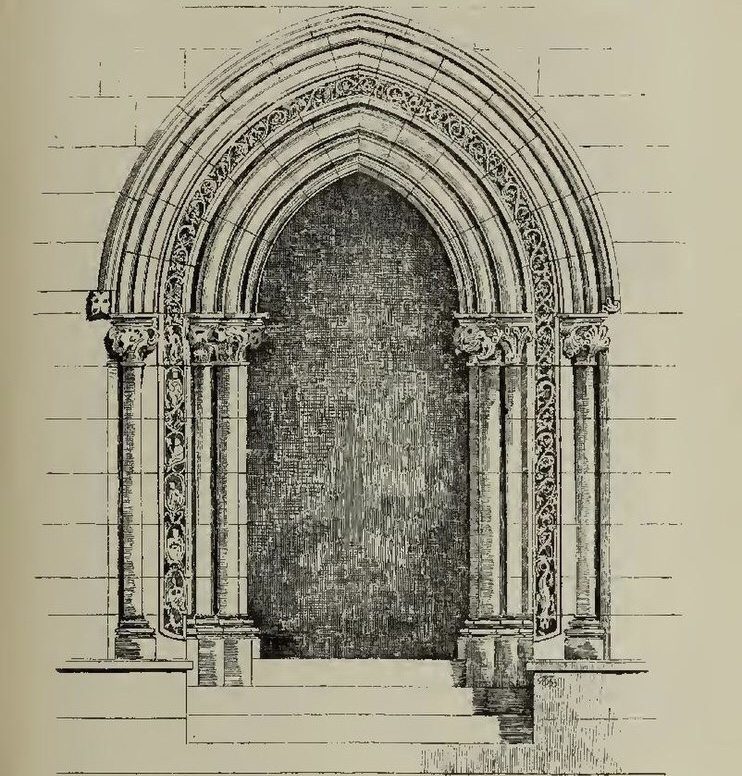

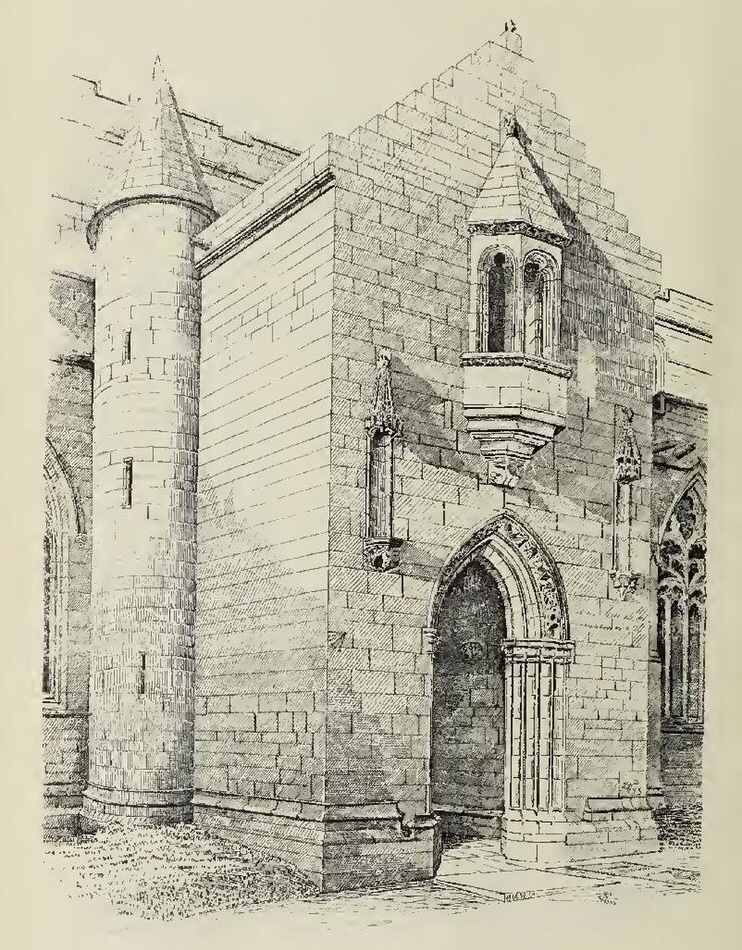

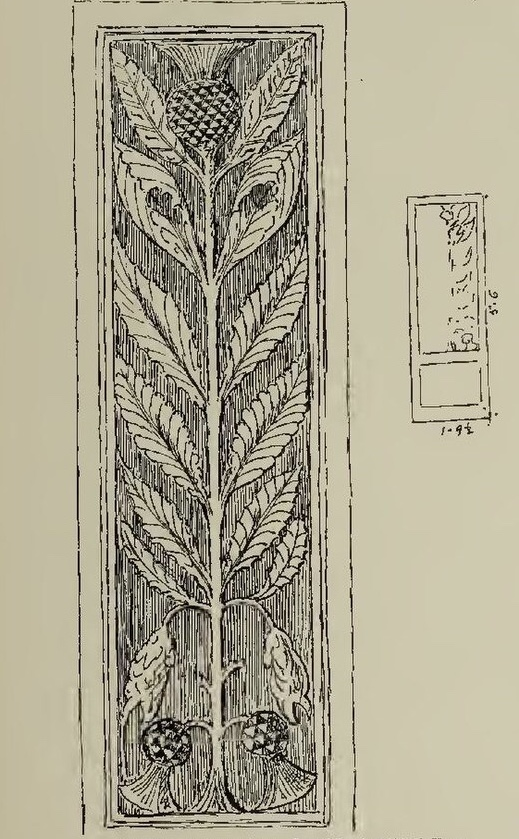

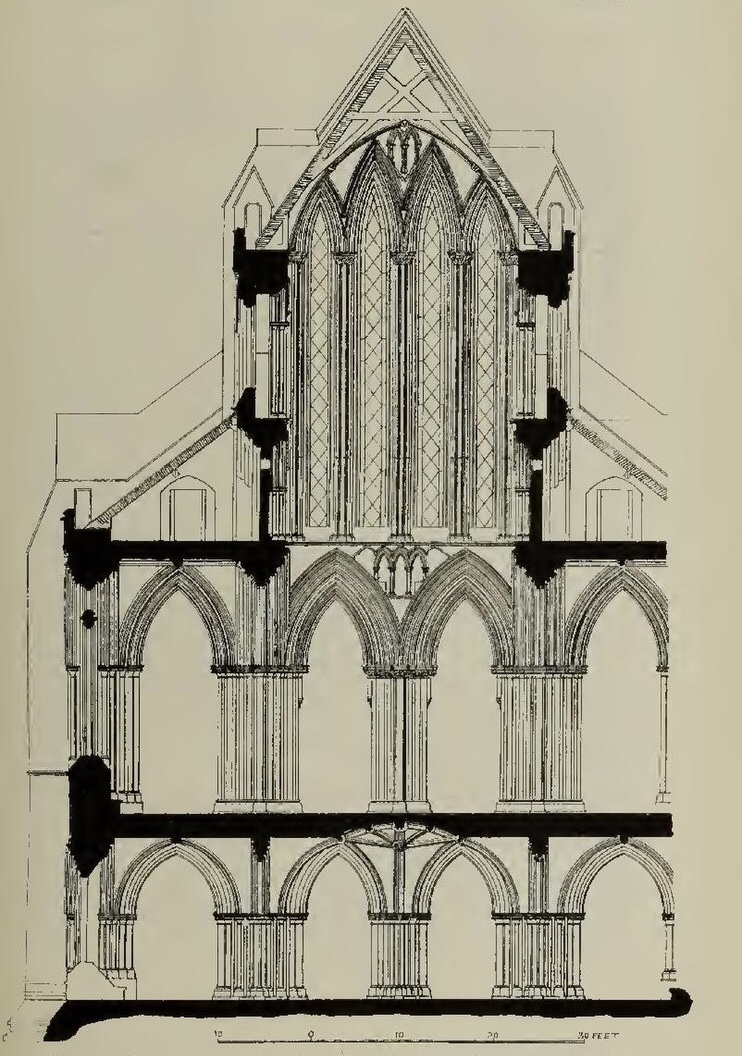
