= The Sea Lady =

1901 fantasy novel by H. G. Wells

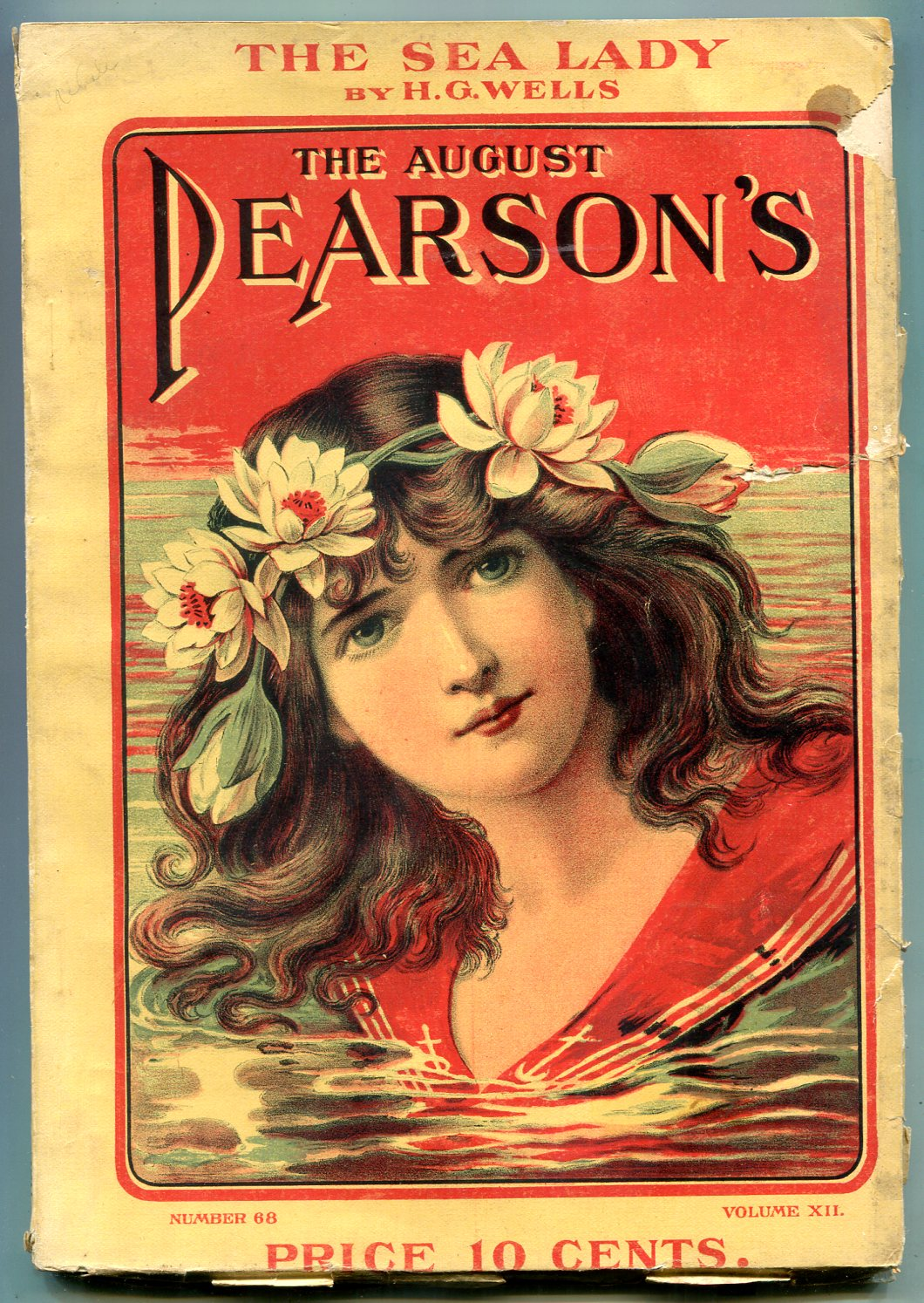
- First publication in Pearson's Magazine
- Author: H. G. Wells
- Original title: The Sea Lady: A Tissue of Moonshine
- Genre: Fantasy
- Publisher: Methuen
- Publication date: July–December 1901
- OCLC: 639905
- Text: The Sea Lady at Wikisource

The Sea Lady is a fantasy novel by British writer H. G. Wells, incorporating elements of a fable. It was serialized from July to December 1901 in Pearson's Magazine before being published as a volume by Methuen. The inspiration for the novel came when Wells caught a glimpse of May Nisbet, the daughter of The Times drama critic, John Ferguson Nisbet, in a bathing suit during her visit to Sandgate. Wells had agreed to pay her school fees after her father's death.

== Plot ==
The intricately narrated story involves a mermaid who comes ashore on the southern coast of England in 1899. Feigning a desire to become part of genteel society under the alias "Miss Doris Thalassia Waters," the mermaid's true intention is to seduce Harry Chatteris, a man whom she saw "some years ago" in "the South Seas—near Tonga" and who has since captivated her. She reveals this plan in a conversation with the narrator's second cousin Melville, a friend of the family who takes in "Miss Waters." As a supernatural being, she is indifferent to the fact that Chatteris is engaged to the socially ambitious Miss Adeline Glendower and is attempting to redeem his misspent youth by entering politics. With mere words, the mermaid shakes both Chatteris and Melville's faith in their society's norms and expectations, enigmatically telling them that "there are better dreams." In the end, Chatteris is unable to resist her alluring charms, even though succumbing to her supposedly means his death.

Couched in the language of fantasy and romance, blending with light-hearted social satire, The Sea Lady explores themes of nature, sex, the imagination, and the ideal in an Edwardian world where moral restraints are loosening. Wells wrote in Experiment in Autobiography that The Sea Lady reflected his "craving for some lovelier experience than life had yet given me."

In its narrative structure, The Sea Lady plays with conventions of historical and journalistic research and verification. According to John Clute, "Structurally it is the most complex thing Wells ever wrote, certainly the only novel Wells ever wrote to directly confirm our understanding that he did, indeed, read Henry James." Adam Roberts has argued that The Sea Lady was written in a kind of dialogue with James's The Sacred Fount (1901).

== Cultural references ==
Miss Adeline Glendower, the elder of the Glendower half-sisters, is an avid reader of Mary Augusta Ward (Mrs. Humphry Ward). Her seaside reading material includes Sir George Tressady, and she is compared to the eponymous heroine of Marcella, both novels by Mary Augusta Ward. Marcella (Lady Marcella Maxwell, née Boyce) is a leading character in both novels.

Sarah Grand was a contemporaneous English feminist writer.

== See also ==
- The Lady from the Sea
- The Little Mermaid
- Undine
- Mermaids in popular culture
