= George Stanley Farnell =

British classical scholar, educator and writer

- Born: George Stanley Farnell
- Died: 5 November 1895; Plémont Cliff, Saint Ouen, Jersey
- Citizenship: British subject
- Education: MA Oxon. (Wadham); University of Oxford
- Occupations: Educator and writer
- Spouse(s): Constance Eugènie Forlonge, dau. of William Forlonge
- Relatives: Lewis Richard Farnell
- Writing career
- Period: Belle Époque, Victorian
- Genres: Classics, textbooks
- Subjects: Greek & Latin Grammar, Greek poetry
- Notable work: Greek Lyric Poetry: A Complete Collection of the Surviving Passages from the Greek Song-Writers

George Stanley Farnell, MA Oxon. (1861 – 1895), was a classical scholar, educator and writer known for his authorship of paedagogical materials, his controversial headmastership of Victoria College, Jersey where he employed corporal punishment, and his subsequent death by drowning.

== Education and career ==
Farnell was educated at the City of London School and gained a scholarship to Wadham College, Oxford in 1879. He graduated BA in 1883 and incepted MA 1886. He served as assistant master at St Paul's School, London, where he published a guide to Ancient Greek grammar and syntax based on methods traditionally used at St Paul's. He remained there until taking up the headmastership of Victoria College in 1892.

== Victoria College Headmastership and Controversy ==
In November 1893 headmaster George Stanley Farnell was arrested and charged with assault following an incident in which he beat, by means of a cane, a 17-year-old student. On 5 December 1893 the magistrate heard evidence from the prosecuting Centenier, a doctor, the student's father, and the student himself, among others. The doctor gave evidence of the severity of the beating. The magistrate decided that since the student's father had been assured that corporal punishment would not be inflicted, there could be no justification in law for the caning, especially given that the student was not a child but of military age. He reprimanded the defendant, bound the headmaster over to act with less severity in future and released him. The headmaster's cane was confiscated by the court. This case sparked controversy. The use of corporal punishment at the college was represented among French speakers as an imposition of English culture and an attack on the liberties of the Jerseyman as enjoyed up until then at the college. The introduction of corporal punishment to Jersey on the model of English public schools was contrasted with the absence of such punishments in French schools.

The magistrate's decision was attacked by the Solicitor-General. The governing body (of which the Solicitor-General was a member) supported the headmaster, who was able to produce a petition signed by his students, supporting the continued use of corporal punishment. All this was in contrast to the tradition established by the first headmaster, Dr Henderson, who had never resorted to the cane. The Constable of Saint Helier (also a member of the governing body) immediately lodged an amendment to the law on compulsory education then under debate, to outlaw corporal punishment in schools subsidised by the States. On 8 January 1894 the States debated the amendment. The Constable of Saint Helier stated that he had felt obliged to put forward the amendment in the light of the recent incident at Victoria College, and that corporal punishment was a barbaric relic. The amendment was rejected by 14 votes to 12.

== Death ==
On 4 November 1895 Farnell went out for a coastal walk in the west of Jersey, it being half-term holiday at the College. The alarm was raised when he had not returned home by midnight, and at 7 a.m. the next morning search parties were sent out, including boys from the College. Farnell's disfigured body, showing signs of having been in the water for a length of time, was discovered in Saint Ouen below Plémont by late morning. The body was discovered by two Victoria College students, Charles Organ and Reginald Beale. The inquest returned a verdict of accidental death. Farnell was thirty-four.

He was commemorated by his brother Lewis Richard Farnell in the inscription of the 1896 edition of the first volume of the first edition of The Cults of the Greek States. The inscription read, "In memoriam fratris dilectissimi et nuper amissi, which means, "In memory of a most beloved and recently lost brother".

== Works ==
- Greek Lyric Poetry: A Complete Collection of the Surviving Passages from the Greek Song-Writers, Longmans, Green & Co.:London & New York, 1891.
- Rules and Exercises on Greek Conditional and Relative sentences, Steely & Co., Ltd.:London: 1892.
- Cornelius Nepos: Selections Illustrative of Greek and Roman History, Macmillan & Co.:London & New York, 1895.
- Tales from Herodotus: with Attic Dialectical Forms Selected for Easy Greek Reading, Macmillan & Co.:London & New York, 1895.
