= David Irving (librarian) =

Scottish librarian and biographer

David Irving (5 December 1778 – 1860) was a Scottish librarian and biographer.

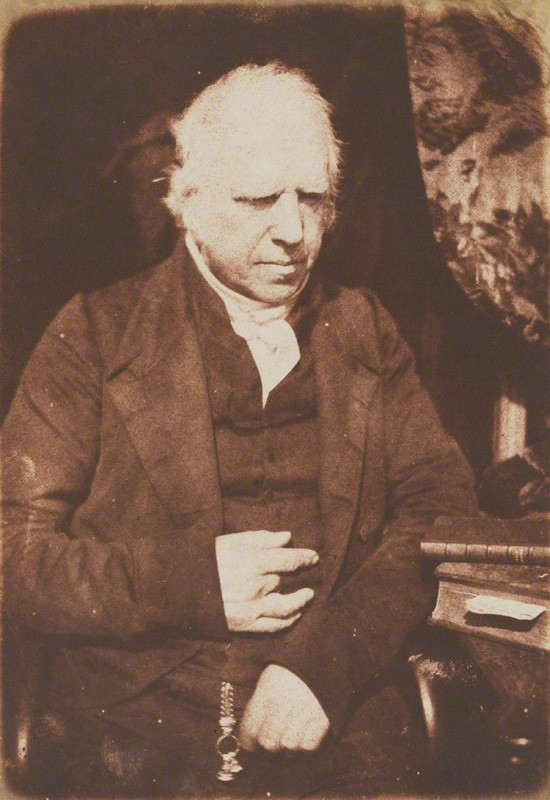
David Irving, 1843 calotype

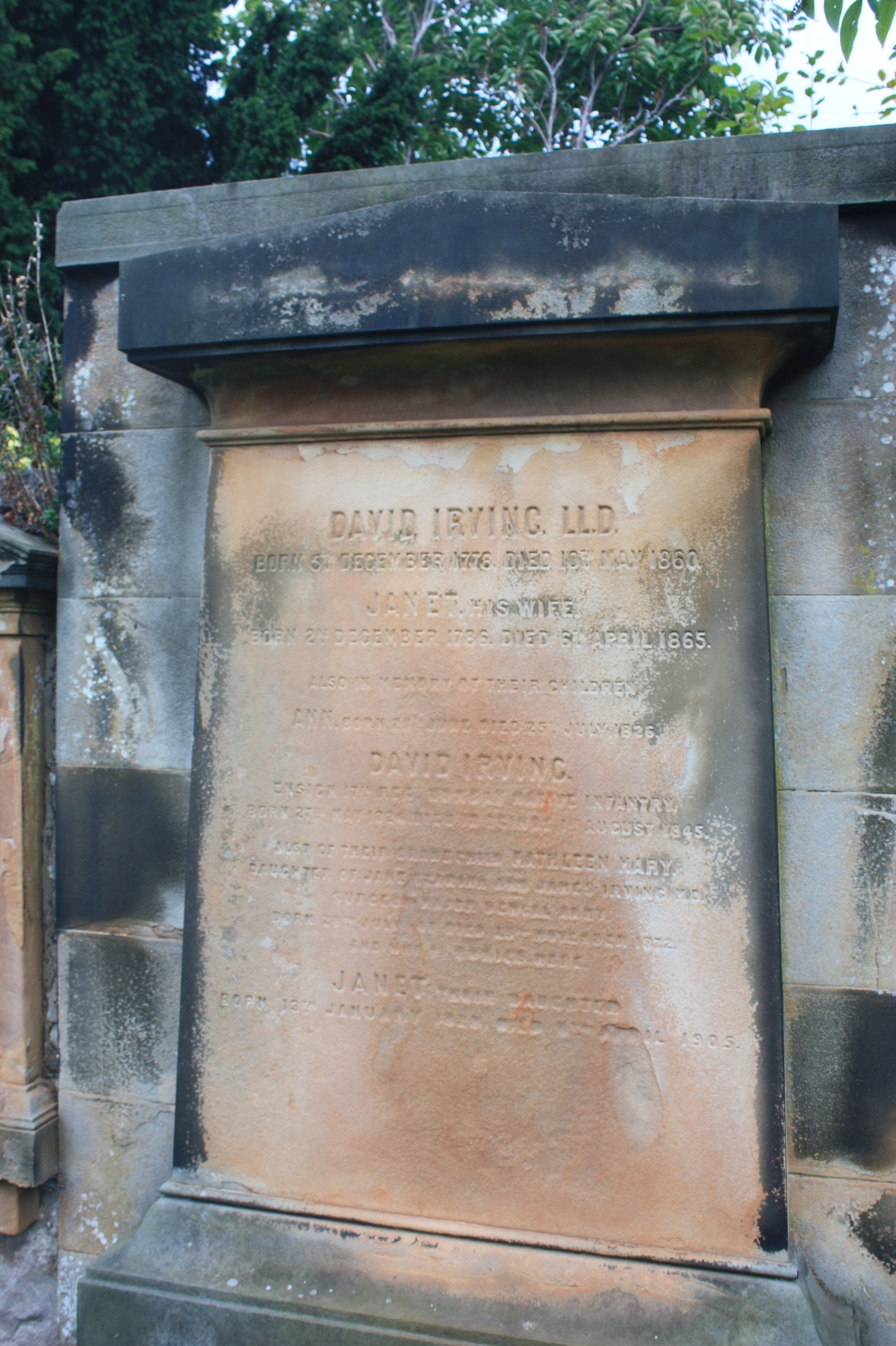
The grave of David Irving, Grange Cemetery

== Life ==
The fourth and youngest son of Helen, daughter of Simon Little and Janetus Irving of Langholm, Dumfriesshire, he was born at Langholm on 5 December 1778. After education at Langholm, he entered the University of Edinburgh in 1796, and in 1801 graduated with an MA. While a student he was a successful private tutor, and enjoyed the friendship of Robert Anderson.

Giving up a plan to enter the church, Irving for a time studied law, but then began to write. In 1808 the University of Aberdeen conferred on him the honorary degree of LL.D, and in the same year he was candidate for a Chair of Classics in Belfast, but withdrew before the election. He taught a few university students who boarded with him.

In 1820 Irving became the Librarian of the Faculty of Advocates. He passed his first vacation at the University of Göttingen, under the terms of his appointment, and in time was awarded an honorary degree from the University. Irving oversaw the problematic purchase of the Astorga Collection in 1825. At the disruption of 1843 he joined the seceders from the Church of Scotland.

In the 1830s he is listed as living on the south side of The Meadows at 6 Meadow Place.

In 1848 the curators of the Library wished Irving to resign his post. He retired, built up a private library of about 7,000 volumes, and died at Meadow Place, Edinburgh, on 11 May 1860.

== Works ==
In 1799 Irving published a Life of Robert Fergusson, with a Critique on his Works (dedicated to Anderson). He followed it by biographies of William Falconer and William Russell. The three works were republished together in 1800, with a dedication to Andrew Dalzel. In 1801 appeared Irving's Elements of English Composition, a popular text-book.

In 1804 Irving published in two volumes The Lives of the Scotish [sic] Poets; with Preliminary Dissertations on the Literary History of Scotland and the Early Scotish Drama. It was followed in 1805 by a Life of George Buchanan; revised and enlarged, it reappeared in 1817 as Memoirs of the Life and Writings of George Buchanan. Irving's tutoring work led in 1815 to Observations on the Study of the Civil Law, reprinted in 1820 and 1823, and in 1837 enlarged as An Introduction to the Study of the Civil Law. In 1819 he edited John Selden's Table Talk (enlarged 1854).

Irving continued to publish as a librarian:

- The poems of Alexander Montgomerie (1821) (editor).
- An edition of Thomas Dempster's De Scriptoribus Scotis (1828–9), for the Bannatyne Club).
- A reprint of Robert Charteris's edition of Philotus, a Comedy (1835).
- The first edited reissue of David Buchanan's Lives: Davidis Buchanani de Scriptoribus Scotis Libri Duo, 1837.
- Clariodus, a Metrical Romance (1830), edited from a sixteenth-century manuscript for the Maitland Club.
- The Moral Fables of Robert Henryson (1832), reprinted from the edition of Andrew Hart, with preface.
- Lives of Scotish [sic] Writers (1839, 2 vols.) republished biographies written for the seventh edition of the Encyclopædia Britannica for which Irving also wrote the articles "Jurisprudence", "Canon Law", "Civil Law", and "Feudal Law".

Irving's History of Scotish Poetry, begun in 1828, appeared posthumously in 1861, published by Edmonston & Douglas, edited by John Aitken Carlyle, with a memoir by David Laing. It incorporated some of his Encyclopædia Britannica articles.

== Family ==
In 1810 Irving married the daughter of Robert Anderson; she died in 1812 after the birth of a son. In 1813 he printed a Memorial of Anne Margaret Anderson, for private circulation. In October 1820 he married as his second wife his cousin, Janet Laing of Canonbie, Dumfriesshire.

He is buried with his wife Janet, against the east wall of Grange Cemetery in Edinburgh, near the main entrance.
