= John Ferguson Nisbet =

Scottish journalist

- Born: 1851; Cadder, Scotland
- Died: 1899 (aged 47–48); London, England
- Occupation: Journalist

John Ferguson Nisbet (1851 – 1 April 1899), was a Scottish journalist, primarily known as dramatic critic for The Times and as a writer.

Nisbet was born in 1851, the son of John Nisbet, Westerhill, Cadder, near Glasgow. He was schooled in Scotland, and attended Glasgow University prior to starting a career in journalism. Initially at the Glasgow Citizen, then Western Morning News in Plymouth, before starting with the Times. He started there in the press gallery, and subsequently, in 1882, became their dramatic critic. He also wrote articles and undertook editorial work simultaneously for some of the weekly publications in London of that time.

Nisbet's writing style was described as a vigorous and compact style, that was frequently touched by the elegance and grace that come of a close acquaintance with the masters of French, Italian, and Spanish literature. As a dramatist he wrote Dorothy Gray, and it was produced at the Princess's Theatre, London, on 10 April 1888

Nisbet married Isabella Frances Fairweather in 1875. He died in London on 1 April 1899, following a longer term lung infection, and was survived by his wife and two children. Following his death, H. G. Wells agreed to pay the school fees for Nisbet's daughter, May Nisbet. Later, May served as the inspiration for Wells' novel, The Sea Lady.

== Works ==
- Marriage and Heredity
- Insanity of Genius
