= The Castellated and Domestic Architecture of Scotland =

Book series by MacGibbon and Ross

The Castellated and Domestic Architecture of Scotland from the Twelfth to the Eighteenth Century
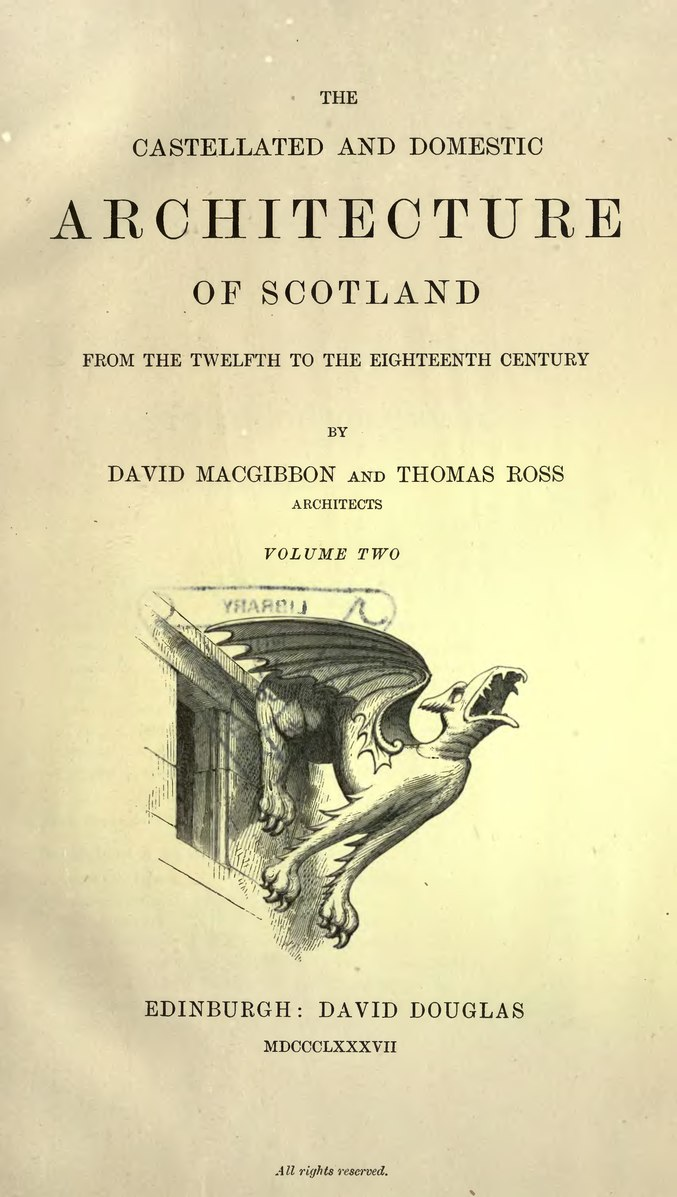
- Title page of volume two
- Author: David MacGibbon and Thomas Ross
- Language: English
- Publisher: Thomas and Archibald Constable, David Douglas
- Publication date: 1887-1892
- Publication place: Scotland

The Castellated and Domestic Architecture of Scotland from the Twelfth to the Eighteenth Century is a book that was published in 5 volumes from 1887 to 1892 by Scottish architects David MacGibbon and Thomas Ross.

The book describes 769 Scottish castles. It includes illustrations and information on the castle's condition.

== Gallery ==
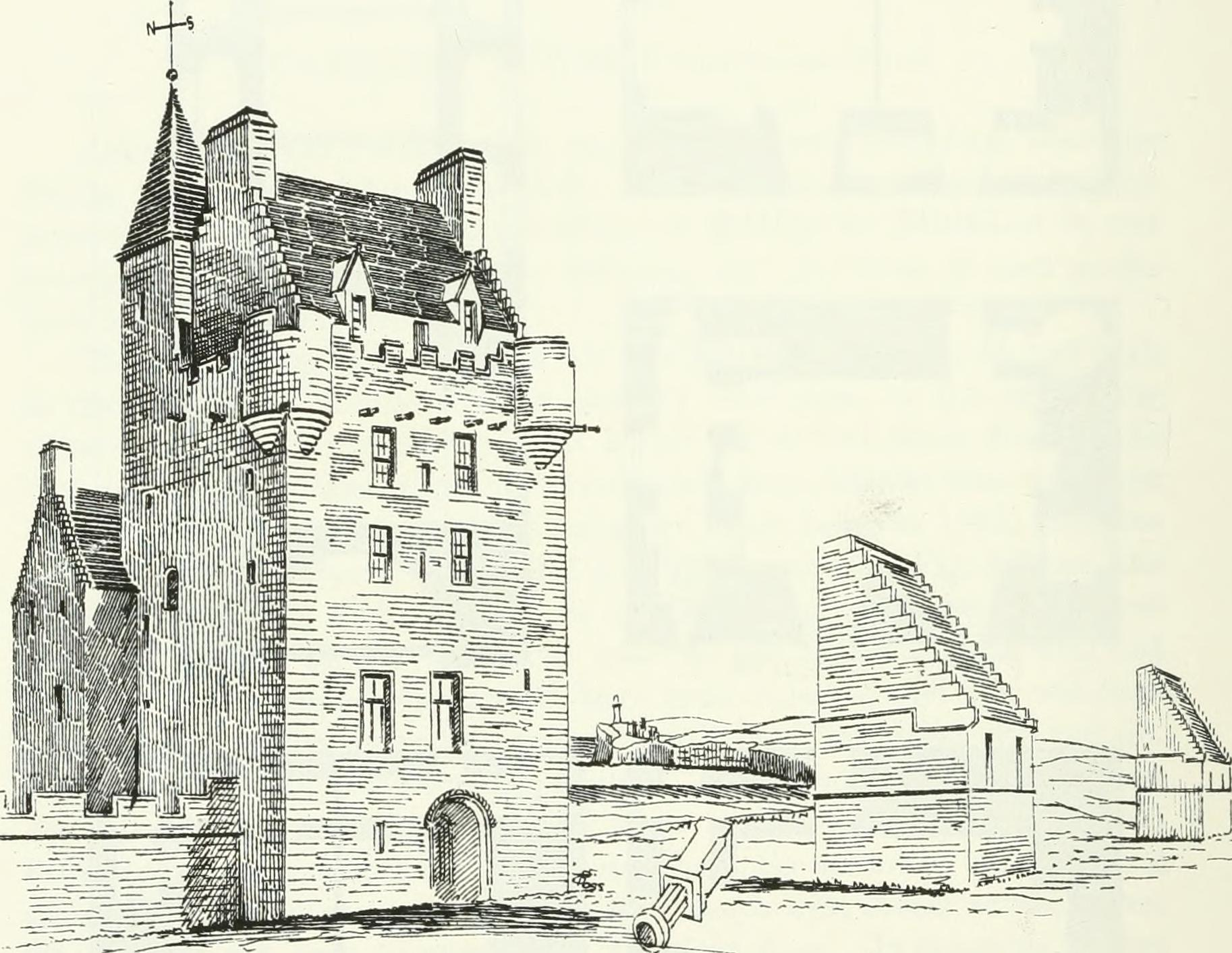

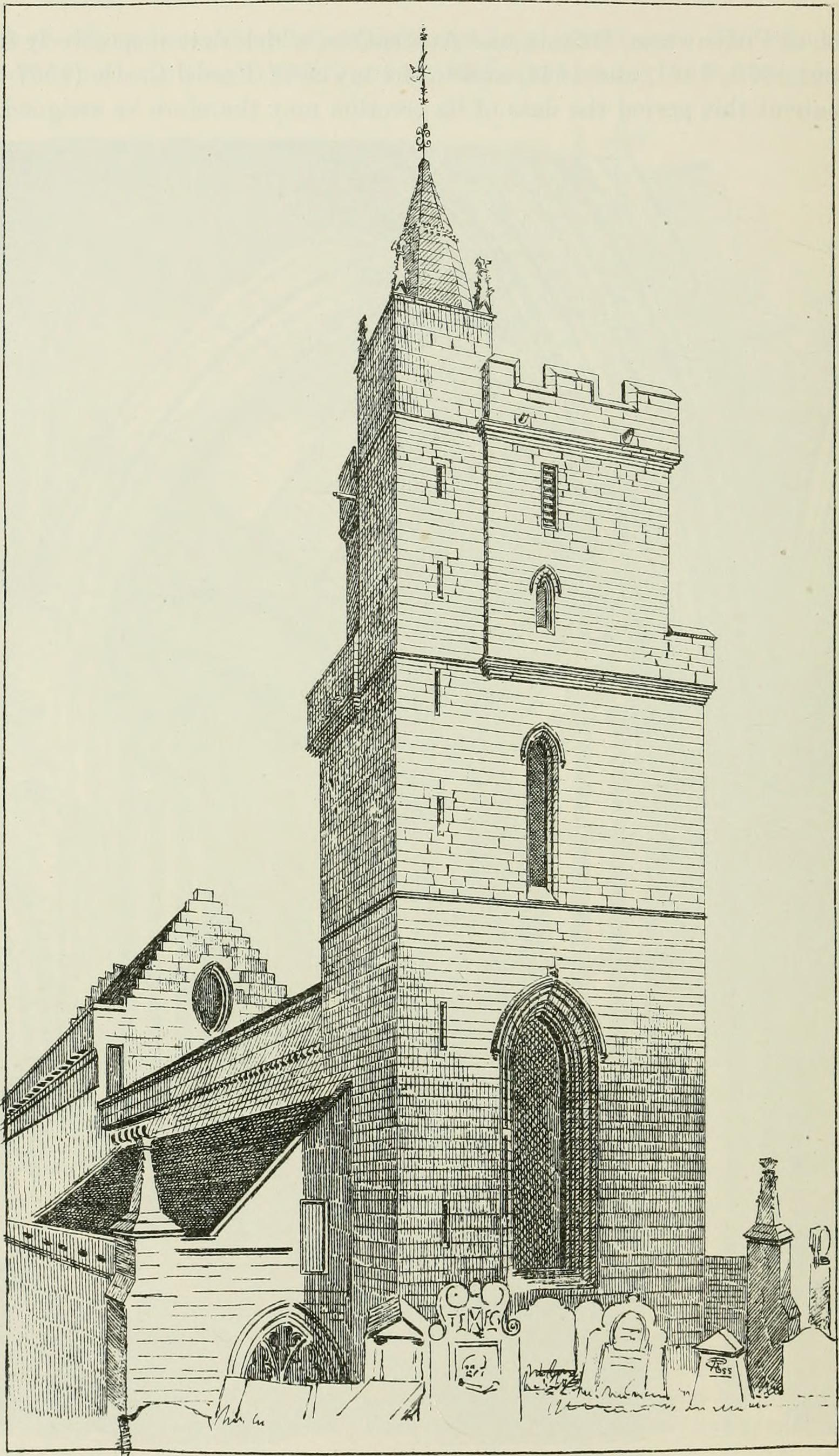

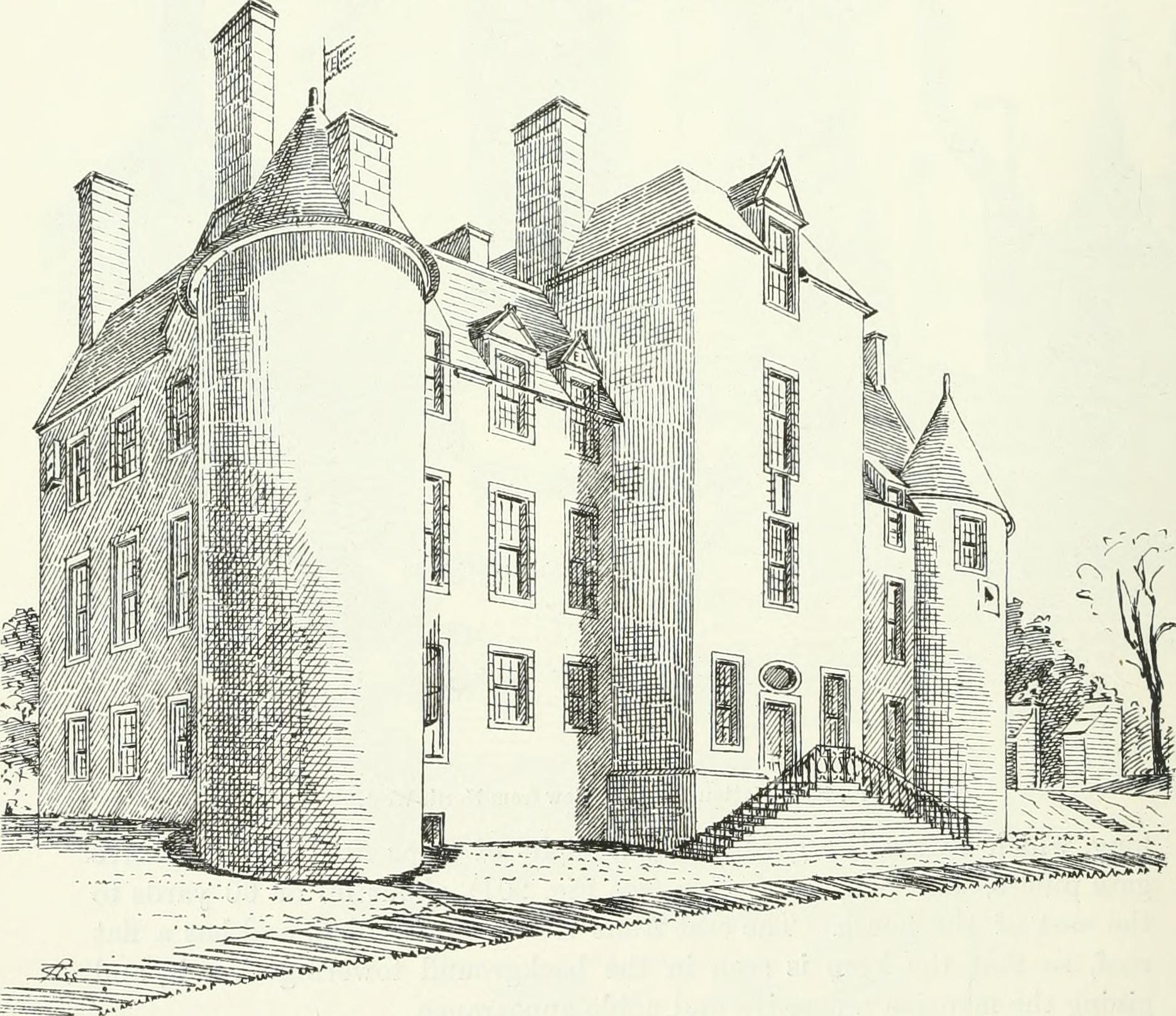

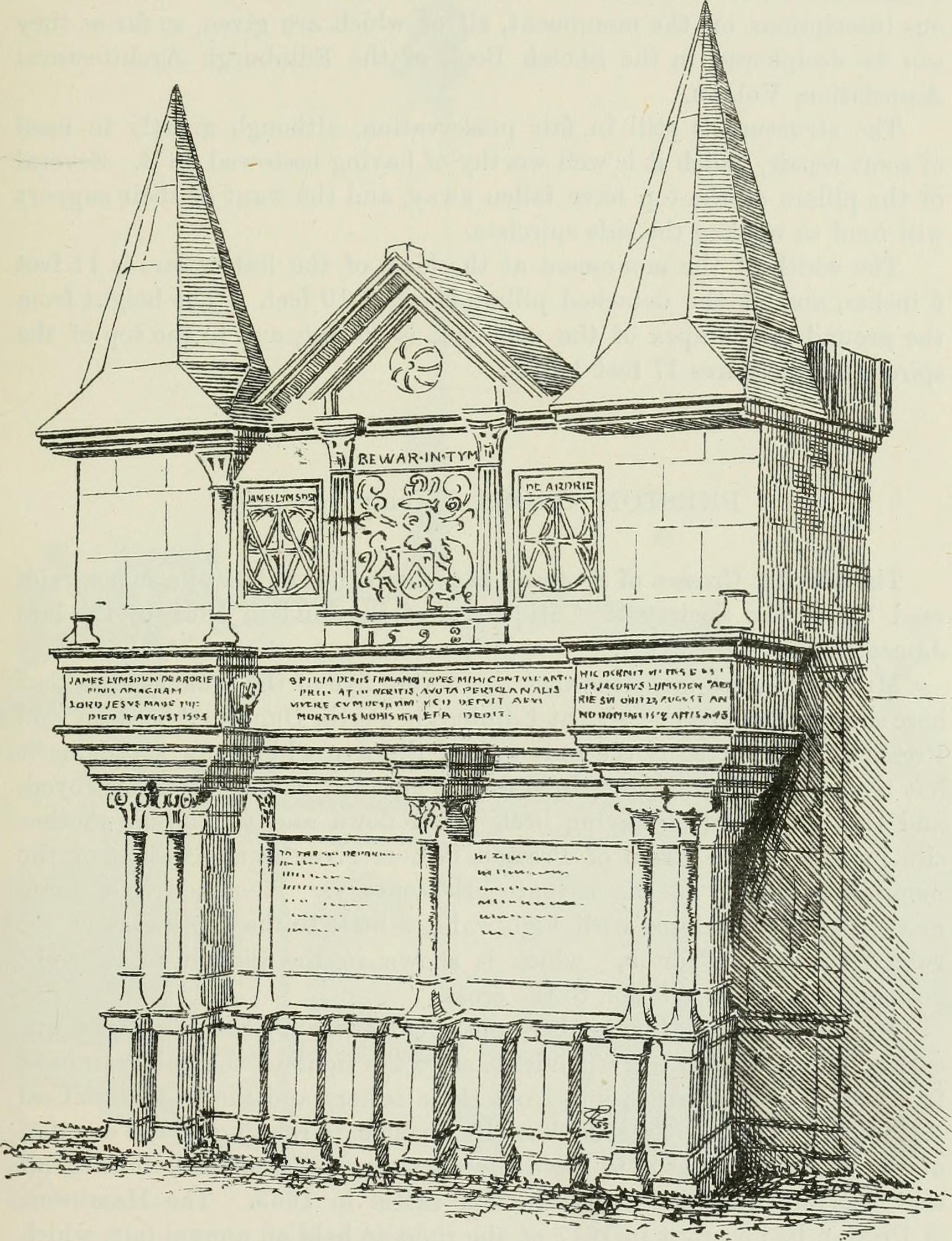

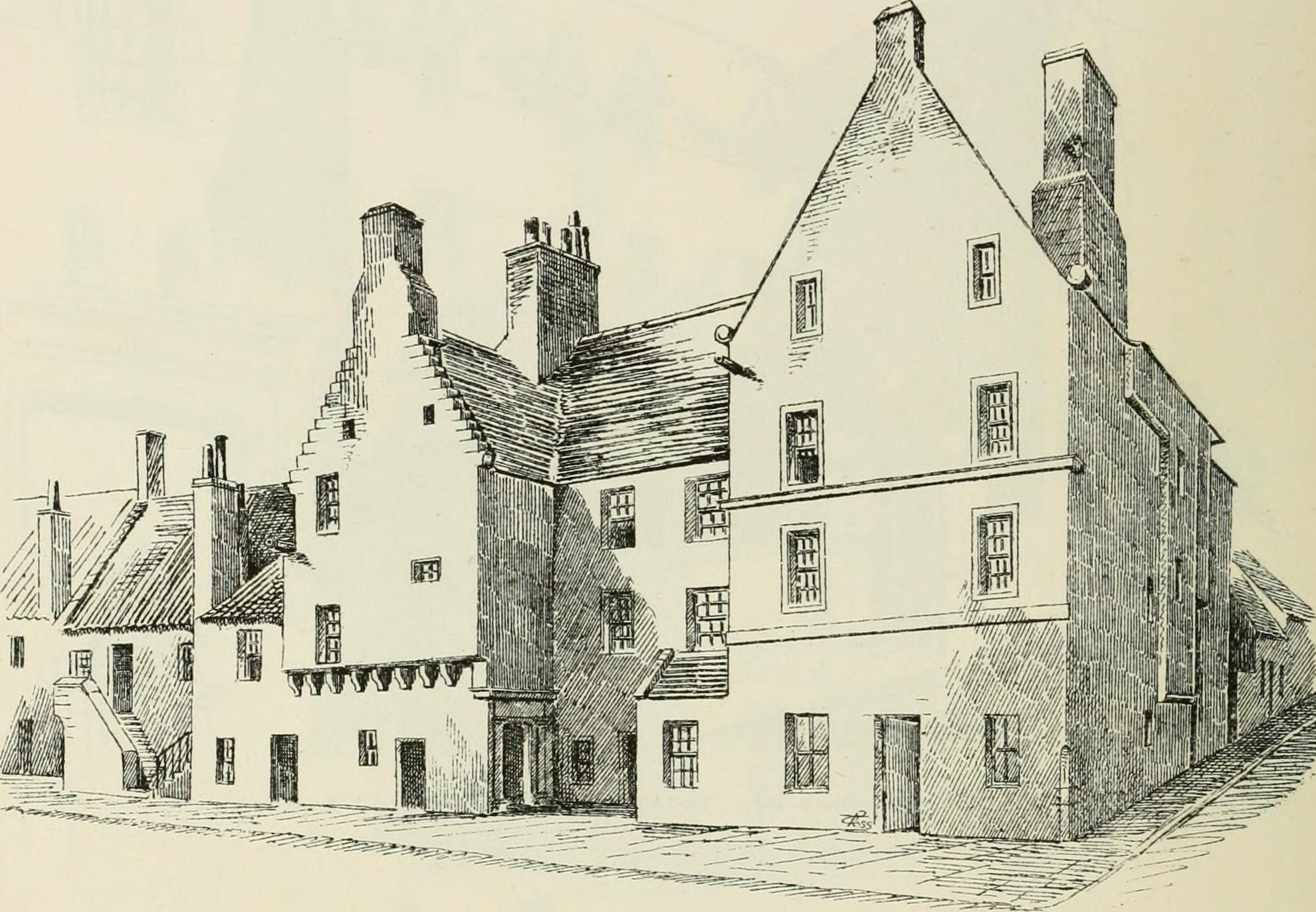

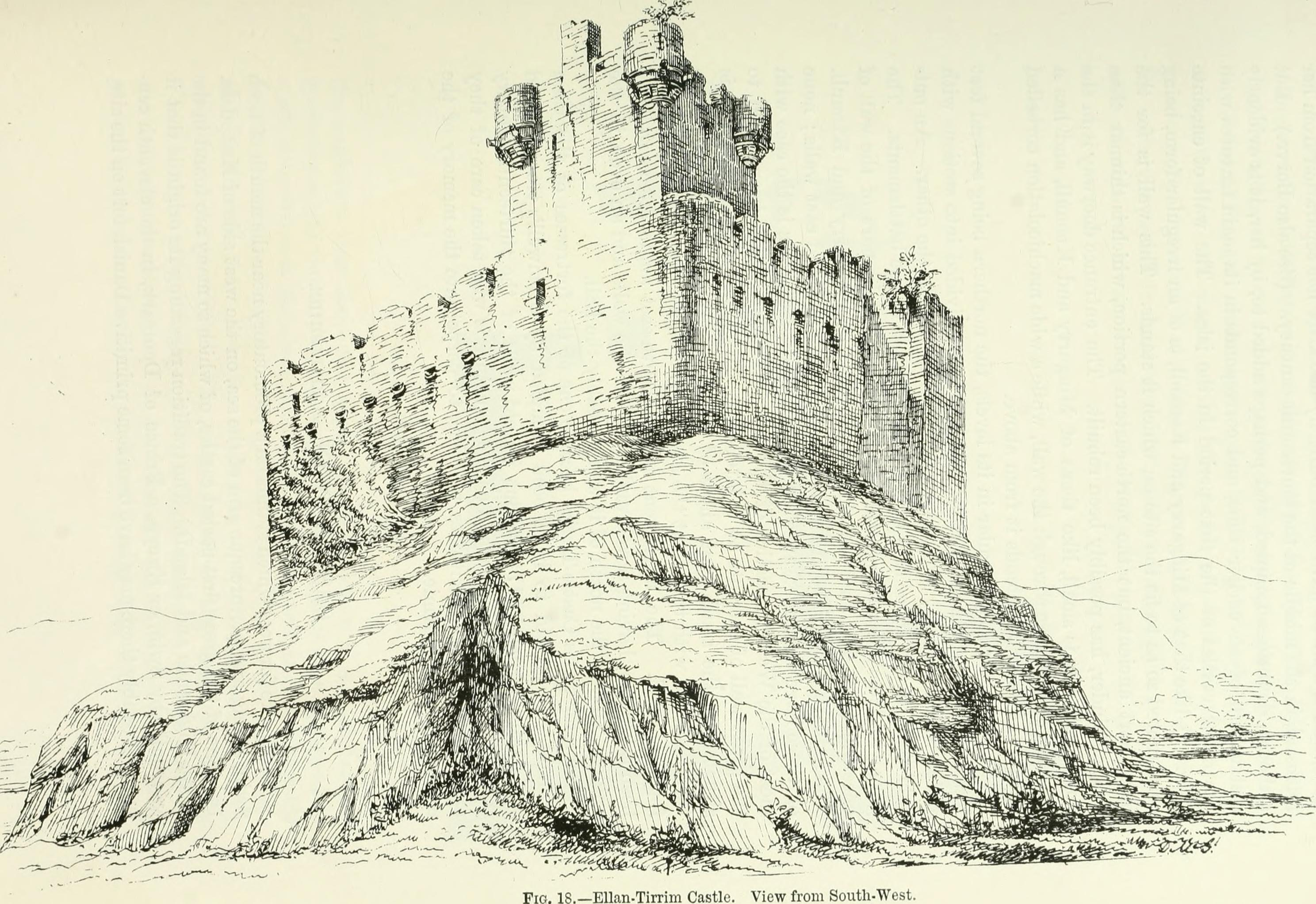

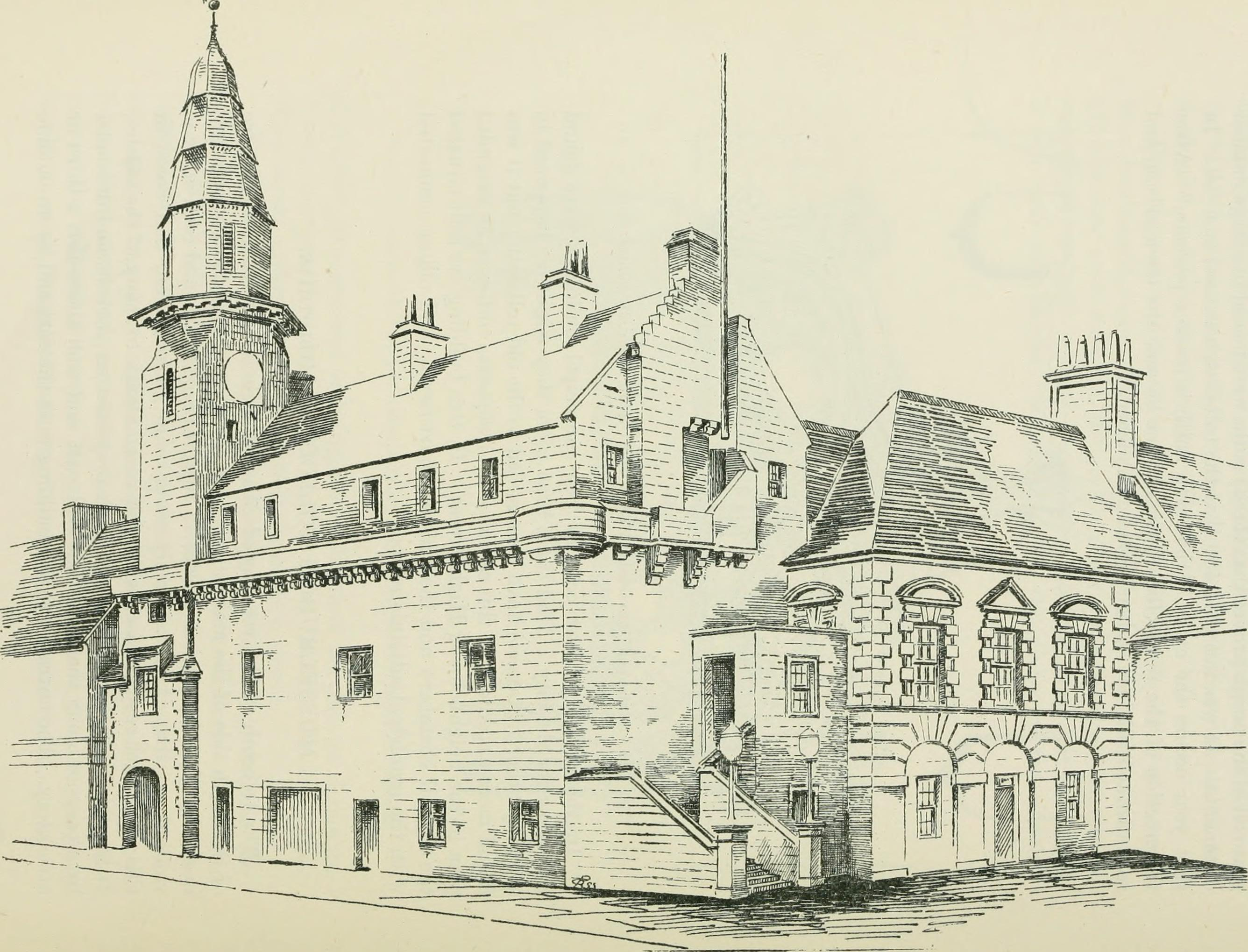

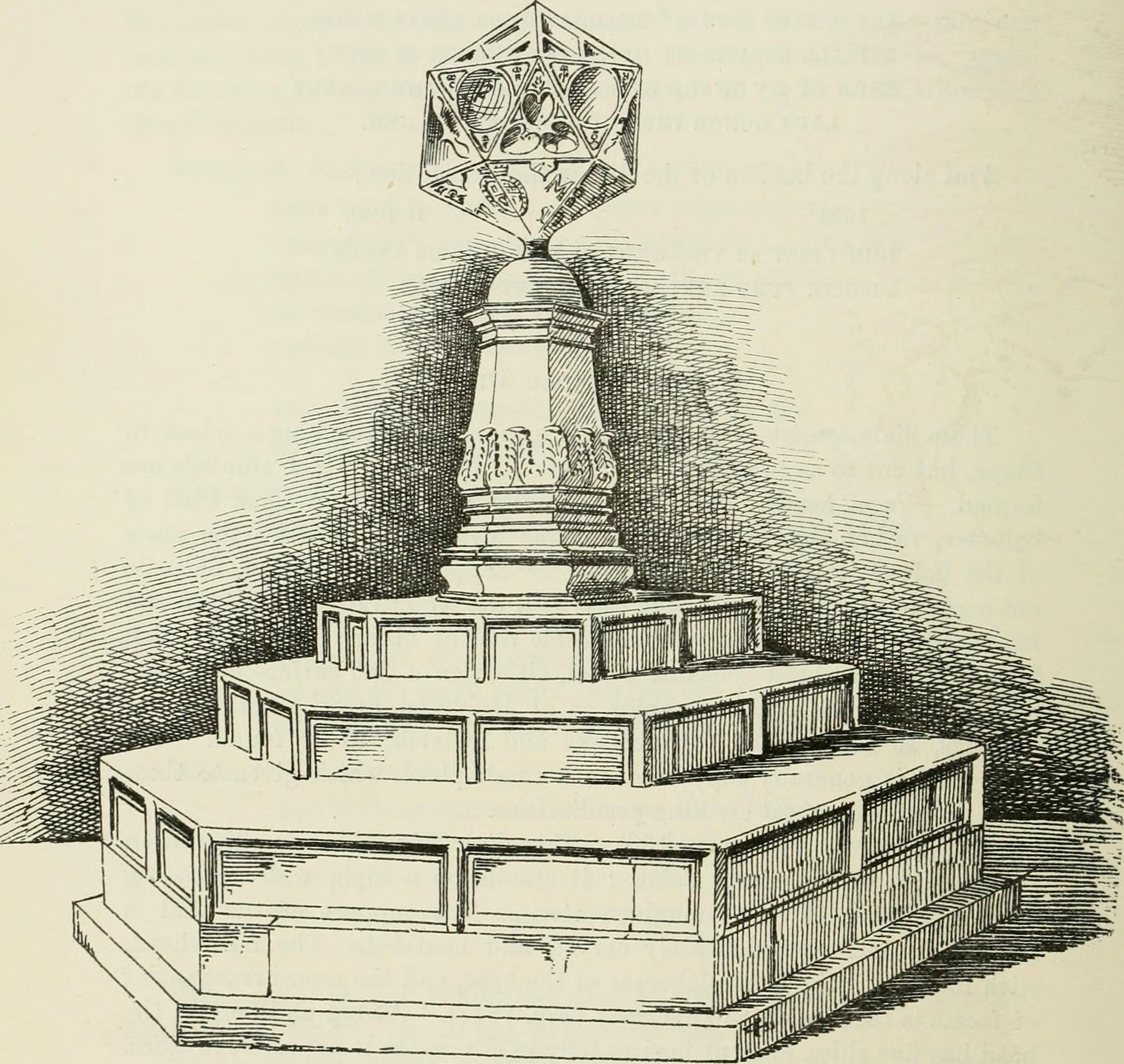

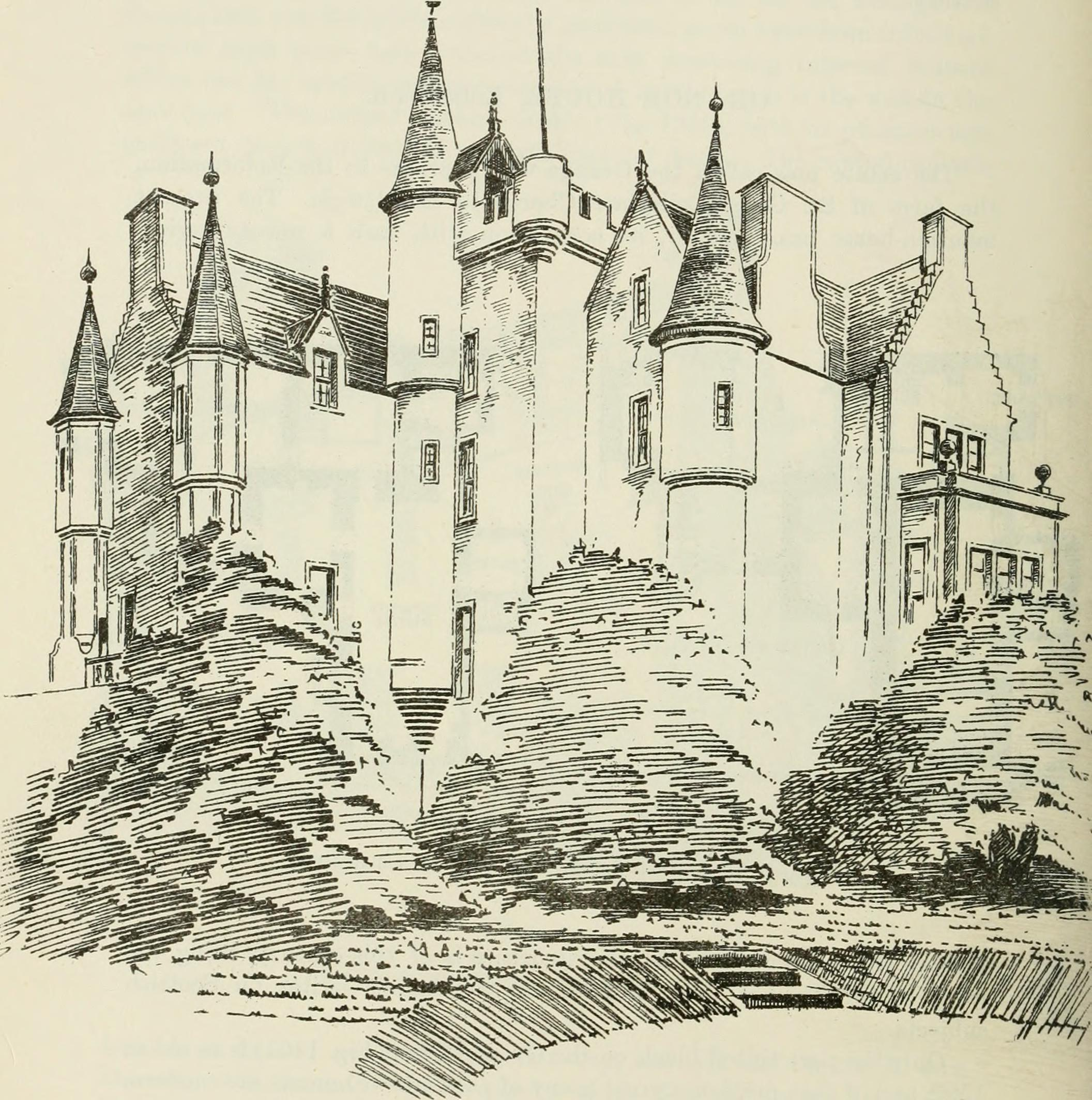
