= Sigge Stark =

Swedish writer

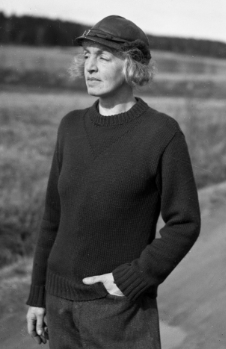
- Stark in 1945
- Born: Signe Björnberg; 22 March 1896; Hidinge, Sweden
- Died: 28 January 1964 (aged 67); Arvika, Sweden
- Occupation: Writer

Signe Björnberg (22 March 1896 – 1 February 1964), best known by her pen name Sigge Stark, was a Swedish writer known for her 100 novels, 600 short stories, and 100 non-fiction works. During the 1940s she became Sweden's most published, most read, and most criticised author.

== Life ==
Signe Björnberg was born on 22 March 1896 near Örebro, Sweden. She was one of the five children of Karl and Otilda (née Borg) Petersén. The young Björnberg spent much of her childhood at the family houses in Närke and Södermanland. Between 1905 and 1907, she lived with her family in Berlin. In 1920, she enrolled in an agricultural course in Ångermanland, and the following year, she moved to Stockholm with the intent of becoming a writer. She became an editor for Vårt Hem and adopted the pen name Sigge Stark. The same year, she published a few short stories in the magazine under that pen name. In 1922, she released her first novel series Den steniga vägen till lyckan. Some of Stark's best-known works were published in Vårt Hem. Examples include Uggleboet (1924), Vildkatten (1925–1926), Ormen i paradiset (1926), Halvor Stormoen (1928), Guldkungen (1932), and Birgers äktenskap (1933–1934).

Although Stark is primarily known for her romance and adventure fiction, she also wrote mysteries, historical, and war novels. Most of her works were in the form of serialised novels released by various publishers, such as Åhlen & Åkerlund, Lindqvist, Sörline, Bonnier, Wahlström, and Semic. She received rapid recognition after the publication of the radio series Hällebäcks gård and Lia-Perla during the 1960s. The former was even made into a film directed by Bengt Blomberg, and starring Gunnar Sjöberg and Sif Ruud. During the 1940s, she became Sweden's most published and most read writer, but according to the Swedish woman's biographical dictionary, also its most criticized.

Stark died in Arvika, on 2 February 1964.
