= Jules Girardin =

French writer

Jules Girardin (1832–1888) was a French writer.

== Works ==
- Les aventures de M. Colin-Tampon
- Contes à Jeannot
- Contes à Pierrot, 1888
