= The Cults of the Greek States =

1896–1909 book series by Lewis Richard Farnell

The Cults of the Greek States is a series of works by Lewis Richard Farnell, D. Litt., first published between 1896 and 1909, in five volumes (at the outset Farnell had only planned for there to be three), at the Clarendon Press, Oxford. The works were groundbreaking because it was the first time that any scholar had attempted to disentangle the history of Greek religion from that of Greek mythology. There was need for the two to be separated since Greek mythology had at the time, in literary circles at any rate, a reputation of being a "bizarre and hopeless thing".

The work, as Farnell freely states in his preface, is indebted to Frazer's The Golden Bough, which generated a whole new way of studying and analysing religion, i.e. comparatively and abstractly. The author states in his preface to the work that, "a compendious account of Greek cults [...] has long been a desideratum in English," and as such Farnell wrote The Cults of the Greek States to sate that desire. Farnell, however, ensured that his work was thoroughly modern for its time. His work did not draw the criticism that Frazer's did since Farnell made no bold comparisons to Christianity but the comparisons he brought to bear within the sole context of Greek culture were no less radical.

The five volumes are in a sense incomplete since they lack "an account of the cults of the dead and the worship of heroes". Nonetheless, Farnell's magnum opus continues to be used as an aid in the study of ancient Greek religion.

== Content ==
The list below serves to provide an idea of the scope and magnitude of this work. The first volume has twelve chapters focussing on the beginnings of cult in Greece and the cults of Cronus, Zeus, Hera and Athena. The second volume focusses on Artemis, Hecate, Eileithyia and Aphrodite. The third volume focusses on Demeter, Kore-Persephone, and Hades/Plouton, followed by the fourth volume, which focusses on Poseidon and Apollo. The fifth, and final, volume focuses on Hermes, Dionysus, Hestia, Hephaestus, Ares and minor cults.

== Bibliography ==
=== Primary ===
Farnell, Lewis Richard. The Cults of the Greek States, vol. 1 (Clarendon Press, Oxford, 1896). 5 vols., hathitrust.org

=== Secondary ===
- Frazer, James George. The Golden Bough (Oxford University Press, 1994).
- Keith, A. Berriedale. "Farnell's Cults of the Greek States"; The Classical Quarterly, Vol. 4, No. 4 (Oct., 1910), pp. 282–285. (Cambridge University Press, on behalf of the Classical Association, 1910.)
