= Blouznivci našich hor =

Blouznivci našich hor is a Czech novel, written by Antal Stašek. It was first published in 1896. The main topic is the life in the mountains Krkonoše and spiritism (therefore the title "blouznivci" meaning "delirious men").

== Plot ==
The novel Blouznivci našich hor tells the unfortunate story of two girls, reveals the spirit believers (spiritism) and shows the time and environment in which they lived. Both stories take place close to each other in the Giant Mountains. However, their only common figure is matchmaker Bobek, an eternally drunk and illiterate loafer who unsuccessfully tries to unite Růženka and Petřík because of the vision of two hundred gold and the parents' pursuit of money. However, Bobek was also a member of the local spiritualist "choir of St. Wenceslas ”. Spiritism (belief in spirits and the arrival of a new messiah) was taken over from Germany in the Czech lands and taken as a kind of faith reform, which the church did not like).

The central character of the first story is Růženka, a nice and pretty girl who was raised in Prague in her youth, due to the dominance of her mother miller. However, after her father's death, her mother pulled her back to the mill, but she read many world authors, especially Byron, so she was bored in the mill. However, she later fell in love with a law student, Čeňek, and wanted to get married, but Čeněk fell ill and soon died. Then his friend and nurse, Dr. Boukal, a pragmatic and introverted man who didn't like her, became interested in her.

After a while, the son of a poor neighbor, priest Jeník, came with him. She learned from him that Jeník had secretly loved her, but he couldn't tell her, and she read from him about the blow to the head he had suffered, which was probably the cause of his madness and paranoia. However, her mother forbade her to leave the house and Jeník died soon after.

However, her mother then learned of her participation in spiritual meetings and sent her to her aunt as punishment. There, after a few months, she received a letter asking her to return home and give her parents money from the dowry, to repair the already indebted mill after the flood. Her aunt and uncle advised her not to do this and save at least herself, but she disobeyed them. After several months of litigation and persecution by creditors, everything was eventually lost and the family had to move to the aunt's vacant cottage, where the story eventually ends. Růženka woke up from the dream world of books, torn by the faith of harsh reality, with which she managed to come to terms.

The second story begins with the departure of Petřík, the farmer's son, from the house, because his parents do not want to allow him a relationship with the poor blacksmith daughter František. He was crazy about her, and every time he had her near her, she had him in full control. In the end, they wanted to get married because he was expecting a baby with her, but Petřík was not tired enough (only 22) and his father would not let him, so František decided that they would both shoot at a rock, but she killed herself in the smithy and the crushed Petřík fortunately, the parents spoke. He then tried to dispel the grief.

The work is characterized by mixing different stories and elaborating many side events that can lead to the loss of the reader in the story.
