= Lewis Richard Farnell =

British classical scholar (1856–1934)

Lewis Richard Farnell FBA
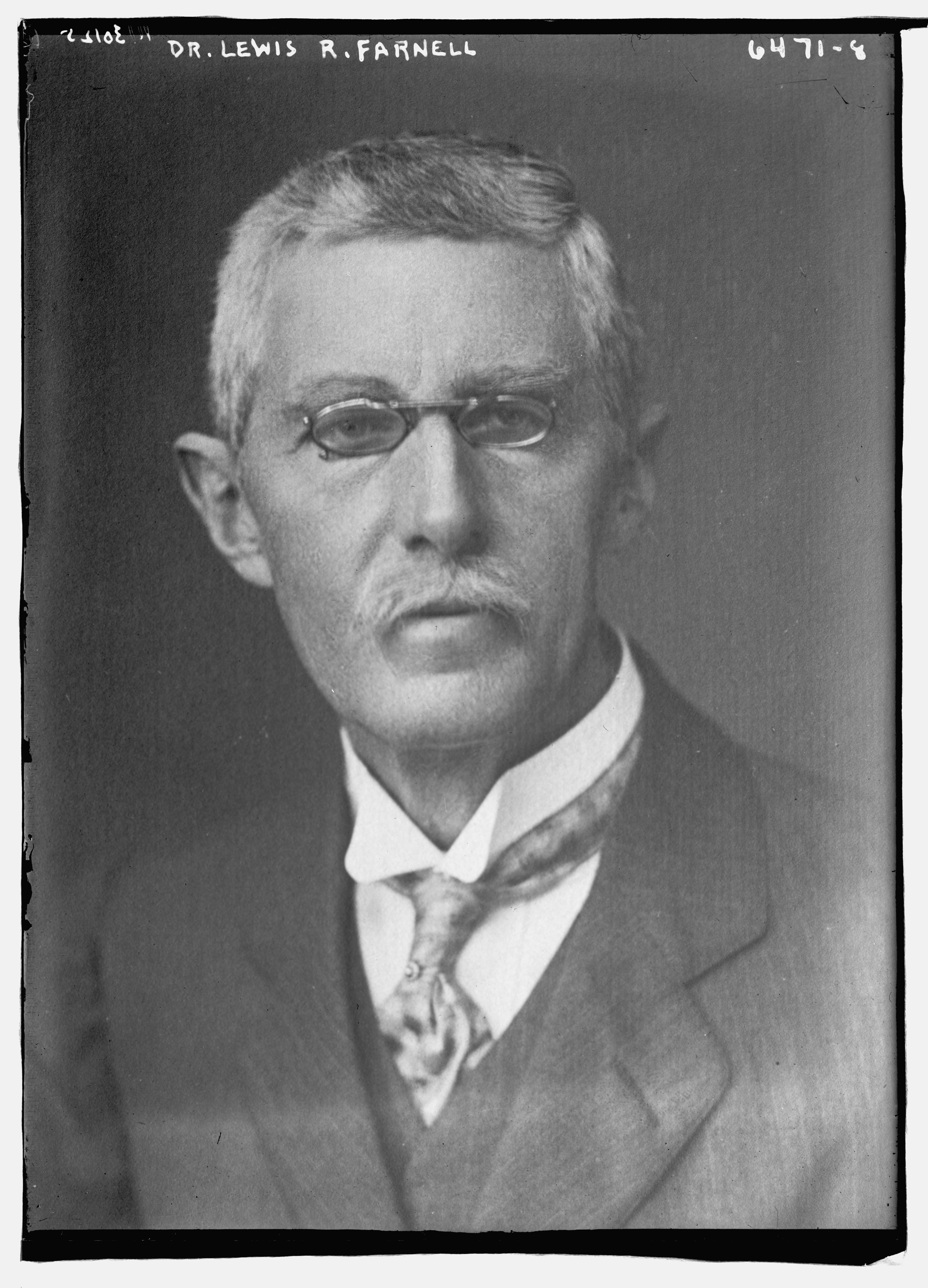
- Lewis Richard Farnell (1856–1934)

Vice-Chancellor of the University of Oxford
- In office 1920–1923
- Preceded by: Herbert Edward Douglas Blakiston
- Succeeded by: Joseph Wells

Personal details
- Born: 1856 Salisbury
- Died: 1934 (aged 77–78)
- Education: Exeter College, Oxford

Lewis Richard Farnell FBA (1856–1934) was a classical scholar and Oxford academic, where he served as vice-chancellor from 1920 to 1923.

== Early life and career ==
Lewis Farnell was born in Salisbury, southern England, in 1856. He was educated at the City of London School and Exeter College, Oxford, where he graduated with a first class degree in Literae Humaniores in 1878. He was elected as a Fellow of Exeter College in 1880 and a lecturer in classics in 1883. From January 1903 he was a lecturer in Classical Archaeology at the university. He was later Rector (head) of the College.

Between 1880 and 1893, Farnell made a series of tours of Europe, studying classical archaeology in Berlin and Munich, as well as travelling in Asia Minor and Greece.

From 1901 he was a corresponding member of the German Archaeological Institute, and in June that year he received the degree of D.Litt. from the University of Oxford. In 1916, Farnell was elected a Fellow of the British Academy. He also received honorary degrees from the universities of Dublin (Ireland), St Andrews (Scotland) and Geneva (Switzerland).

== Work ==
From 1896, Farnell published many books, including:

- The Cults of the Greek States (5 volumes)
- Greece and Babylon (See Ancient Greece and Babylon.) (1911)
- Outline-History of Greek Religion (1920)
- Greek Hero Cults and Ideas of Immortality (from a series of Gifford Lectures delivered at St Andrews University)
- The Evolution of Religion: An Anthropological Study (1905)

He delivered the following Gifford Lectures:

- Greek Hero Cults and Ideas of Immortality (1919–20)
- The Attributes of God (1924–25)

== Family ==
In 1893, Farnell married Sylvia (born 1872), youngest daughter of Captain Christopher Baldock Cardew of East Liss, Hampshire, and granddaughter of the Lord Chancellor Richard Bethell, 1st Baron Westbury. They had three sons and one daughter.

Farnell commemorated his brother, George Stanley Farnell in the inscription of the 1896 edition of the first volume of the first edition of The Cults of the Greek States. The inscription read, "In memoriam fratris dilectissimi et nuper amissi, which means, "In memory of a most beloved and recently lost brother".

Academic offices
| Preceded by William Walrond Jackson | Rector of Exeter College, Oxford; 1913–1928 | Succeeded by Robert Ranulph Marett |
| Preceded by Herbert Edward Douglas Blakiston | Vice-Chancellor of Oxford University; 1920–1923 | Succeeded by Joseph Wells |
