= David Douglas (publisher) =

Scottish publisher (1823 – 1916)

- Born: 1823
- Died: 1916 (aged 92–93)
- Occupation: Publisher

David Douglas FRSE FSA (1823 – 1916) was a Scottish publisher in the 19th century. He was publisher of works by authors including John Stuart Blackie and Dr John Brown. In later life he formed half of the successful Edinburgh publishing business Edmonston & Douglas. The latter were responsible for a highly popular set of animal prints aimed at children. His final partnership was called Douglas & Foulis.

== Life ==
Douglas was born in Stranraer in south-west Scotland the son of William Douglas and Sophia Black, and attended school in Whithorn.

Douglas went to Edinburgh, probably around 1837, as a printer's apprentice. He soon after joined the staff of William Blackwood & Sons. Gaining confidence and skill he set up his own printworks. In 1847 he formed a partnership to create Edmonston and Douglas, based at 87 Princes Street, which lasted 30 years. On the death of his partner Alexander Edmonston in 1877 he formed a new company with Thomas Foulis, named Douglas & Foulis, which lasted until his death. Douglas & Foulis appear to have operated a popular circulating library in the early 20th century, which, for a cost of one guinea per year, a member could borrow one book per month, and for ten guineas per year 30 books per month could be borrowed.

Douglas was for many years Editor of the Proceedings of the Society of Antiquaries of Scotland. In 1866 he was elected a Fellow of the Royal Society of Edinburgh his proposer being Alexander Campbell Fraser. From 1891 to 1909 he conducted a prolonged correspondence with William Winter in New York City.

In later life his business was at 10 Castle Street and his house at 22 Drummond Place, both in Edinburgh. In these final years he moved from his earlier more intellectual and historical focus to the republishing of American novels in Britain as cheap editions.

Douglas died of pneumonia in Edinburgh on 4 April 1916.

Following his death most ongoing work was absorbed by Thomas Noble Foulis (Foulis’ son) who had set up his own business T. N. Foulis in 1903. The firm later evolved into Hunter & Foulis.

== Family ==
He was married to Sarah Burns Millidge.

His daughter, Sarah Wyse Douglas (d.1886), married the oceanographer, Sir William Abbott Herdman.

== Most noteworthy publications ==
See

- Rab and his Friends by Dr John Brown (1859 onwards) 31 editions
- Popular Tales from the Norse by Peter Christen Asbjørnsen (1859) 16 editions
- Scotland in the Middle Ages by Cosmo Innes (1860) 2 editions
- The History of Scottish Poetry by David Irving (1861) 4 editions
- Scotland Under Her Early Kings by Eben William Robertson (1862) 4 editions
- Christopher North by Mary Wilson Gordon (1862) 4 editions
- Ancient Leaves by D'Arcy Wentworth Thompson (1862)
- History of English Literature by Hippolyte Taine (1864 onwards) 35 editions
- The Insane in Private Dwellings by Sir Arthur Mitchell (1864)
- Prometheus the Fire-Bringer by Richard Henry Horne (1864) 6 editions
- Hidden Depths by Felicia Skene (1862)
- Public Health in Relation to Air and Water by William Tennant Gairdner (1862)
- Studies in Poetry and Philosophy by John Campbell Shairp (1868 onwards) 13 editions
- The Home Life of Sir David Brewster by Margaret Maria Gordon (1869) 4 editions
- Gossip about Letters and Letter-Writers by George Seton (1870)
- Recollections of a Tour Made in Scotland by Dorothy Wordsworth (1873) 13 editions
- Archibald Constable and his Literary Correspondents by Thomas Constable (1873) 5 editions
- Four Phases of Morals by John Stuart Blackie (1874) 7 editions
- The Journal of Henry Cockburn, autobiography of Henry Cockburn (1874) 2 vols 4 editions
- The Large Game and Natural History of South and South-East Africa by the Hon William Henry Drummond (1875) 4 editions
- Sketches of Thermodynamics by Peter Guthrie Tait (1877) 5 editions
- The Orygynale Cronykil of Scotland by Andrew of Wyntoun (1879) 4 editions
- Recollections of Curious Characters and Pleasant Places by Charles Lanman (1881)
- Birds from Moidart and Elsewhere by Jemima Blackburn (1895)
- Johannis de Fordun Chronica Gentis Scotorum by John Fordun (1871) 4 editions
- Archaeological Essays by Sir James Young Simpson (1872) 3 editions
- Lectures on Scottish Legal Antiquities by Cosmo Innes (1872) 3 editions.
- Winter Sunshine by John Burroughs (1884)
- An Echo of Passion by George Parsons Lathrop (1884)
- A Borrowed Month and other Stories by Frank Richard Stockton (1887)
- Studies in the Topography of Galloway by Sir Herbert Maxwell (1887)
- The Castellated and Domestic Architecture of Scotland by David MacGibbon and Thomas Ross (1887-1892)
- The Annals of Scottish Natural History (1892)
- Christianity and the Ideal of Humanity in Old Times and New by John Stuart Blackie (1893)
- Familiar Letters of Sir Walter Scott (ed., 1894)
- Idyls in Drab by William Dean Howells (1896)
- Fare and Physic of a Past Century by Ella Christie and Alice Stewart (1900)
- The Journal of Sir Walter Scott (1910)
- Trench pictures from France (1915)
- Russian Court Memories 1914-1916 (1917)
- The Demon by Mikhail Lermontov (1918)
