= Sir George Tressady =

1896 novel by Mary Augusta Ward

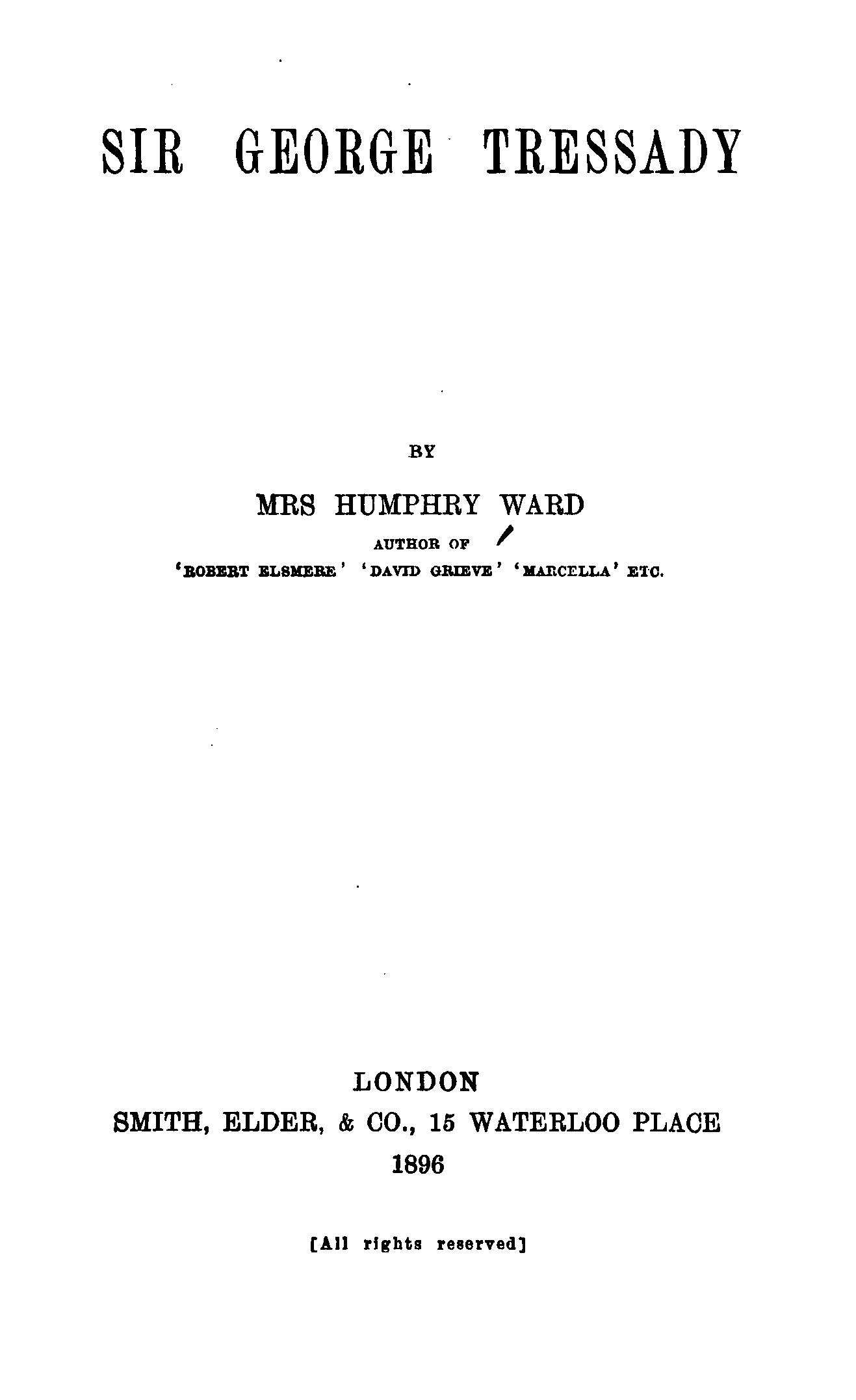
- Title page of the first edition.
- Author: Mary Augusta Ward
- Language: English
- Publisher: Smith, Elder & Co.
- Publication date: 1896
- Publication place: England
- Pages: 571

Sir George Tressady is a novel by Mary Augusta Ward. Originally published as a serial from 1895 to 1896, it was Ward's seventh novel.

This is the book that Miss Adeline Glendower, the elder of the Glendower half-sisters, has chosen for her seaside reading in The Sea Lady, a social satire by H. G. Wells.
