= MacGibbon and Ross =

Scottish architects

David MacGibbon (2 April 1831 – 20 February 1902) and Thomas Ross (10 November 1839 – 4 December 1930) were Scottish architects. Their practice, MacGibbon and Ross, was established in 1872 and continued until 1914. They are best known today for their comprehensive published surveys of Scotland's architectural heritage.

== David MacGibbon ==
David MacGibbon
- Born: 2 April 1831; Edinburgh
- Died: 20 February 1902 (aged 70)
- Occupation: Architect
- Practice: MacGibbon and Ross
- Buildings: Morningside Free Church, Edinburgh; Simpson Hotel, Edinburgh; Various tenement blocks in Edinburgh
- Projects: The Castellated and Domestic Architecture of Scotland

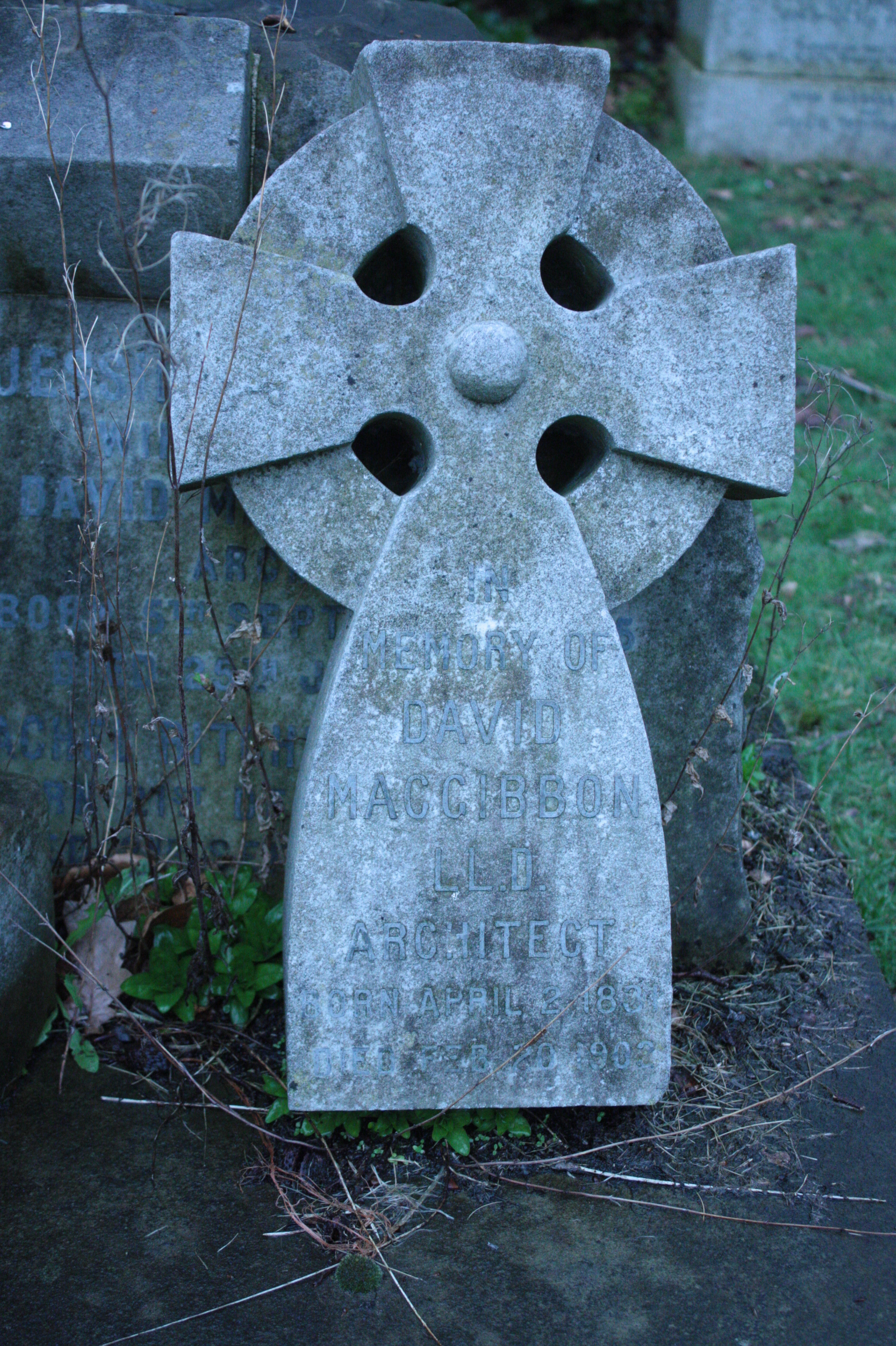
The monument to David MacGibbon, Dean Cemetery

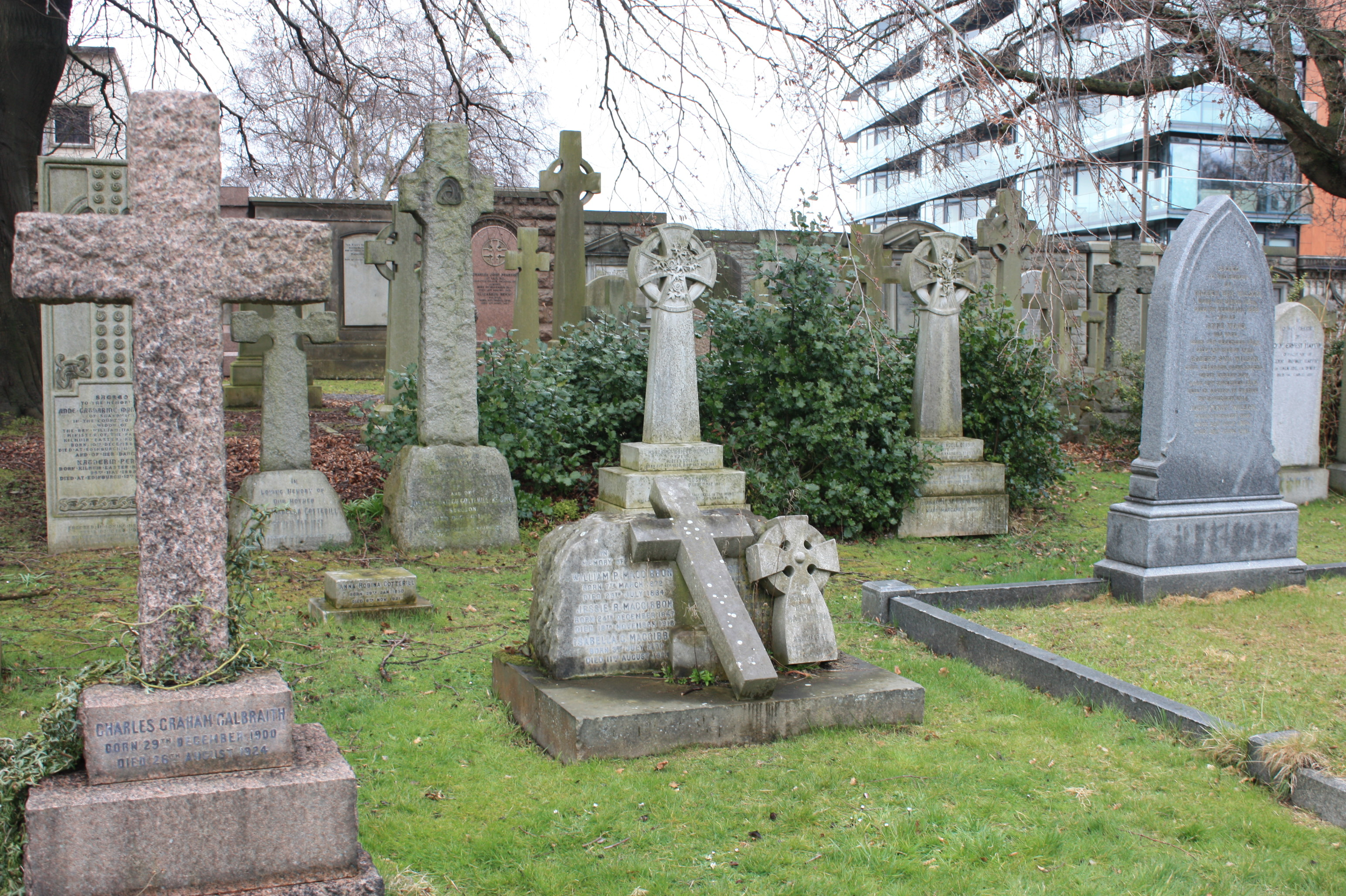
David MacGibbon's grave in context, Dean Cemetery

David MacGibbon LLD was born in Edinburgh, into a family of builders, and was educated at the Royal High School. He attended the University of Edinburgh from 1846–49, but did not graduate. In 1851 he joined the London office of architect William Burn, and made study tours to Europe during the 1850s. From 1856 he went into practice with his father Charles, drawing details for houses.

By 1858 he had opened his own office in Edinburgh, later becoming architect to the Merchant Company of Edinburgh, involving work to the city's schools. He was the principal architect to the Royal Bank of Scotland from 1861 (succeeding David Rhind), designing bank branches for Dunfermline, Kilmarnock, Montrose, and many others. From 1862 he employed Thomas Ross as his assistant, making him a partner and establishing MacGibbon and Ross ten years later.

In 1865 MacGibbon married Jessie Vannan Rintoul, and acquired the estate of Laggan, Ballantrae, from his father. After 1867 they built a new house on the estate (Gurphur, since demolished), and also purchased a house in the Dean Village area of Edinburgh. Later, a larger house was built at Ashfield in Grange Loan. These properties had to be sold in the early 1880s following the crash of the City of Glasgow Bank, to avoid the bankruptcy of MacGibbon's cousins.

In 1880 he was elected president of the Edinburgh Architectural Association, and gave lectures on the architecture of Scottish castles and country houses. He had been making field visits and sketching for some years, building up a first-hand knowledge of the topic. It was these surveys and papers which formed the basis for the publication of The Castellated and Domestic Architecture of Scotland.

While on holiday in July 1884, MacGibbon's son William was killed and his daughter Rachel permanently injured when a sandbank collapsed on them. Rachel's lungs were affected and the family were forced to move to the French Riviera to aid her recovery. He continued sketching, publishing The Architecture of the Riviera in 1888. Returning to Scotland, he continued his surveys for the continuing publication of The castellated and domestic architecture of Scotland and The ecclesiastical architecture of Scotland. He began a parallel project on the continent with his son Alfred in the 1890s, although this never reached fruition. His workload brought on a heart condition which worsened over the next years. Although he published The Five Great Churches of Galloway in 1899, by that year he was too ill to attend the University of St Andrews to accept an honorary degree.

In later life he was living with his family at 23 Learmonth Terrace, whilst his office (with Ross) was at 65 Frederick Street in Edinburgh's New Town.

He died in 1902, survived by his wife and son, and three daughters. He is buried in the north-west section of the northern (19th century) extension to Dean Cemetery in western Edinburgh. His grave is both very small and somewhat damaged. It has been moved back to rest against the much larger grave of his wife Jessie.

== Thomas Ross ==
Thomas Ross
- Born: 10 November 1839; Errol, Perth and Kinross
- Died: 4 December 1930 (aged 91); Edinburgh
- Occupation: Architect
- Practice: MacGibbon and Ross
- Buildings: Morningside Free Church, Edinburgh; Simpson Hotel, Edinburgh; Various tenement blocks in Edinburgh; Lady Glenorchy South Church Hall
- Projects: The Castellated and Domestic Architecture of Scotland

Thomas Ross was the son of a farmer, also Thomas Ross, and Ann Murray. He was born at Wardheads, Errol, and attended local schools before going to Glasgow around 1855 to work as an assistant to architect Alexander Kirkland. He soon moved to the office of Charles Wilson, winning a measured drawing competition during his time there. He spent the proceeds on a study trip to Yorkshire, visiting Fountains Abbey among other sites.

In 1862 he began as an assistant to David MacGibbon in Edinburgh, and was made a partner in the firm of MacGibbon and Ross in 1872. Soon after this he married Mary MacLaren. Ross began sketching the architecture of Scotland along with his senior partner, contributing to the latter's public lectures, and culminating in the pair's major publications. After MacGibbon's removal to the continent, Ross managed the practice alone, and also continued to make sketching trips for their ongoing publications. The books brought in many commissions for restoration work, but many schemes were never realised, and business declined generally.

After MacGibbon's death in 1902, his place was taken by his son Alfred. Ross himself was appointed as a founder commissioner of the Royal Commission on the Ancient and Historical Monuments of Scotland in 1908, and was awarded an honorary degree from the University of Edinburgh in 1910. He gave the Rhind lectures in 1899, on Scottish architecture. Fred MacGibbon was later appointed architect to the RCAHMS, but was diagnosed as diabetic and resigned in 1914, dissolving the practice. He died the following year.

Ross continued alone until 1916, when he retired to his home in Saxe-Coburg Place, Edinburgh, occasionally undertaking small commissions. He was arrested in 1915 for sketching in a prohibited area, while studying Rossend Castle in Fife, and fined five shillings. In 1918 he was elected to the Royal Scottish Academy as Professor of Antiquities.

He died three years after his wife, at the age of 91, and was survived by his son James MacLaren Ross, also an architect, and two daughters. He is buried in Comely Bank Cemetery in north Edinburgh.

== Published works ==
These surveys include history, descriptions, sketches and measured plans, of buildings throughout the country, every one visited in person. Their published works are still considered definitive today, comprising as they do a "totally comprehensive survey of Scottish architecture prior to the Restoration."

- The Castellated and Domestic Architecture of Scotland from the twelfth to the eighteenth centuries, 5 vols. (1887–92)
- The Ecclesiastical Architecture of Scotland from the earliest Christian times to the seventeenth century, 3 vols. (1896–97)
