= Knapp Ranch, California =

Knapp Ranch
- formally Kelly Ranch
- Location of Knapp Ranch in southern California
- 34.687636°N 118.663817°W
- Location: Cienaga Canyon
- Nearest city: Gorman, California

History
- Founded: 30 August 1904
- Founder: Heinrich (Henry) Edward Woest

Site notes
- Area: Angeles National Forest
- Owner: Frank John Knapp (1962 - 1990)

The historic Knapp Ranch (1962 to 1995) was located at the upper end of the Castaic Creek drainage in a broad alluvial valley at the head of Cienaga Canyon, south of Liebre Mountain and west of Bear Canyon in the north-west corner of the Angeles National Forest.

The ranch was first settled as a 160-acre land patent in the late 1890s with ownership transferred to Henry E. Woest in 1904 through the provisions of the 1862 Homestead Act.

After nearly a century of private ownership by Woest, Kelly, and Knapp, the property was acquired by the Angeles National Forest in 1995. Many native American artifacts have been found on the ranch property and nearby areas. In 1962, Frank John Knapp, Jr. and his brother Alfonso Alfred Knapp bought the ranch from the Kelly family.

== Ethnohistory ==
Many native American artifacts have been found on the ranch property and nearby areas. Chester King, an archaeologist specializing in the study of the prehistory of California, places the archaeological sites CA-LAN-433 and CA-LAN-434 below Knapp Ranch as being the remains of moomga, cacuycuyjabit, ajuavit, and/or juyubit/huyung. These identifications are postulated from the names of settlements in San Fernando Mission records. These settlements were systematically depopulated by Spanish missionaries between 1802 and 1805 as the traditional inhabitants were relocated to Spanish missions.

== Cienaga Ranch ==
Heinrich (Henry) Edward Woest was born on 9 April 1872 in Manhattan, New York City. In early adulthood, Henry accompanied his mother to California after her husband, Heinrich Woest, died in 1875. As a young adult, Henry Woest acquired the land holding under the 1862 Homestead Act with private ownership transferred to him on 30 August 1904. The property was defined as the northeast quarter (160 acres) of Section 22 of Township 7 North, Range 17 West, San Bernardino Meridian.

Henry was a commercial bee keeper who, in the early 1900s, was managing 130 colonies of bees which produced tons of honey every year Henry used three donkeys to haul lumber to the property to build a ranch house that is still standing but now in ruins.

The property was originally called the Cienaga Ranch named after Cienaga Canyon in which the ranch was located. The name, Cienaga Canyon, appeared on USGS maps as early as 1903 at the time of the granting of the land patent.

Henry was the half-brother of Annie Rose Briggs whom she called "Eddie". They partnered in efforts to locate lost 19th-century gold mines believed to be in the immediate area of the Cienaga Ranch.

== Kelly Ranch ==
A man named Kelly bought the Cienaga Ranch in the mid-1920s and it was subsequently known as the Kelly Ranch for several decades. Very little is known about the ranch or the people involved during the Kelly era of ownership.

The name "Kelly Ranch" first appeared on a U.S. Geological Survey (USGS) map that was surveyed in 1930. A 1931 USGS map shows an "Emergency Airplane Landing Field" located on the Kelly Ranch however this feature was not included on later maps.

A regular visitor to the Kelly Ranch as a teenager, David Wasdahl, remembers that a family named Pearce or Pierce were managing or caretaking the ranch in the late 1930s. Tom Benz (Benco Mine) said: "The care takers of the Kelly Ranch was Coronal Shaffer and his sister. My dad knew him from church and he gave us his pet goat which we had in Plum Canyon."

The family sold the property in 1962 after Kelly died.

Jon Meyer, a regular visitor to the Knapp ranch in the 1960s, recalls: "When I asked Frank Knapp how he found the Kelly Ranch...he said he did some stone and rock work for the family back in the day.....and acquired it from 'Grandma Kelly'.....no one in the Kelly family wanted to keep it."

== Knapp Ranch ==
In 1962, Frank John Knapp, Jr. (1900 - 1990) and his brother, Alfonso Alfred Knapp (1902 - 1968), bought the ranch property as equal partners from the Kelly family. According to the part-time foreman at Knapp Ranch, Ronald T. Abramchuk (nickname "Black Bart"), the brothers planned to turn the ranch into a hunting lodge. When Alfonso died unexpectedly a few years later in 1968, Frank bought his partner's half share for $40,000 and became the sole owner of the Knapp Ranch.

== Immigration ==
Their father, Franz ("Frank") John Knapp Sr. was born on 21 November 1875 in Tyrol, Austria

The Knapp family immigrated from Austria to the US in waves. Franz Knapp first came to the US from Austria with his family in June 1903. They sailed on the "SS Finland" from Antwerp on 6 June 1903 and arrived in the port of New York on 16 June 1903. The "SS Finland" was an American-flagged, ocean liner built in 1902 for the Red Star Line.

Franz Knapp Sr. remained in American while his wife, Maria Johanna Meixer Knapp (1878 - 1949), returned to Austria with their three young children.....their eldest daughter, Hedwig, and two sons, Frank Jr. and Alfonzo. They were to return to the US again about a year later aboard the SS Zeeland sailing from Antwerp on 30 July 1904 and arriving in the USA on 9 August 1904.

Johanna once again returned to Austria with their three young children. In 1910, they returned to remain permanently in America aboard the SS Frankfurt sailing from Bremen on 20 October 1910.

== Owensmouth Castle ==
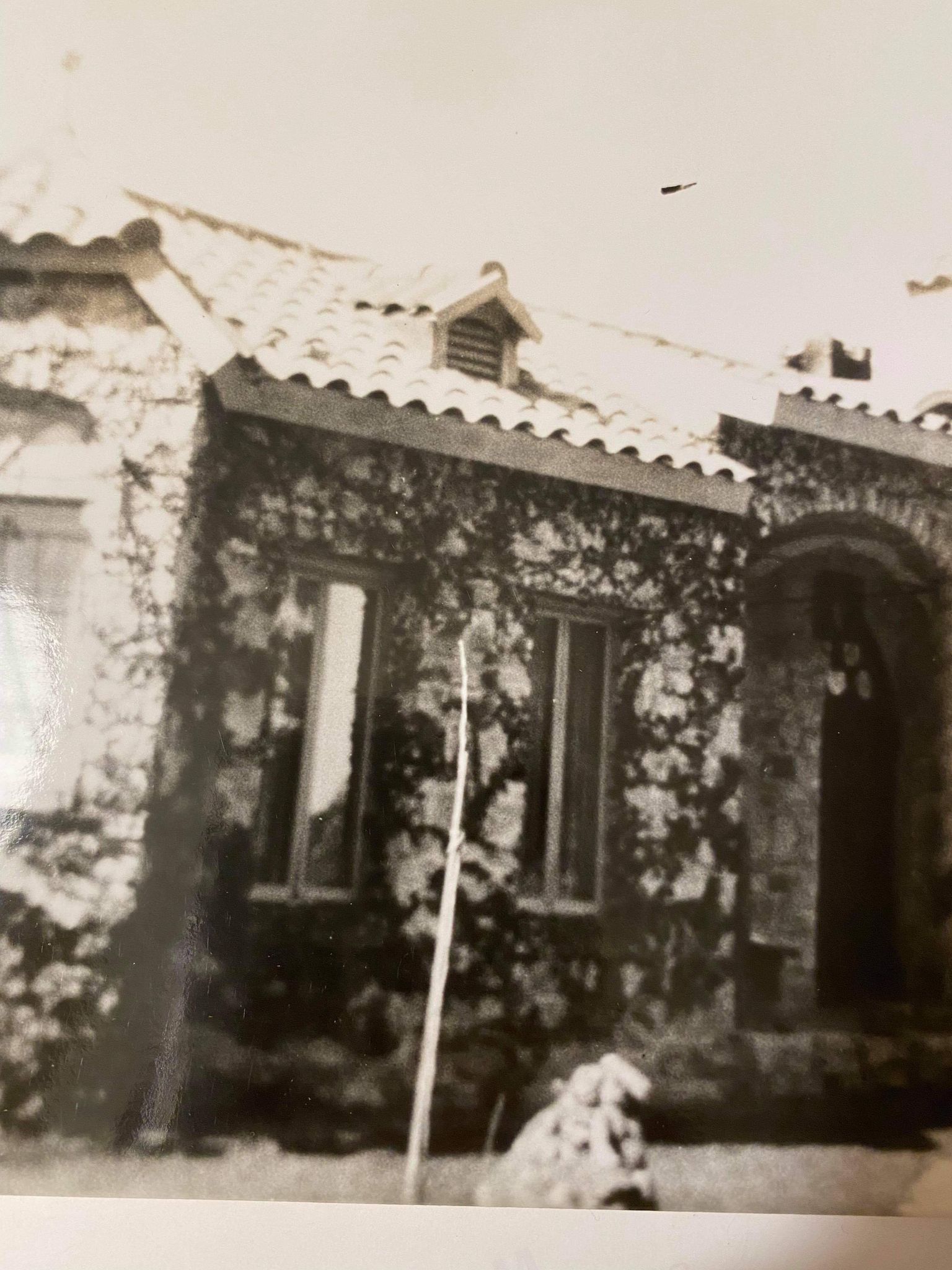
A photo of the Owensmouth Castle taken in the mid-20th century.

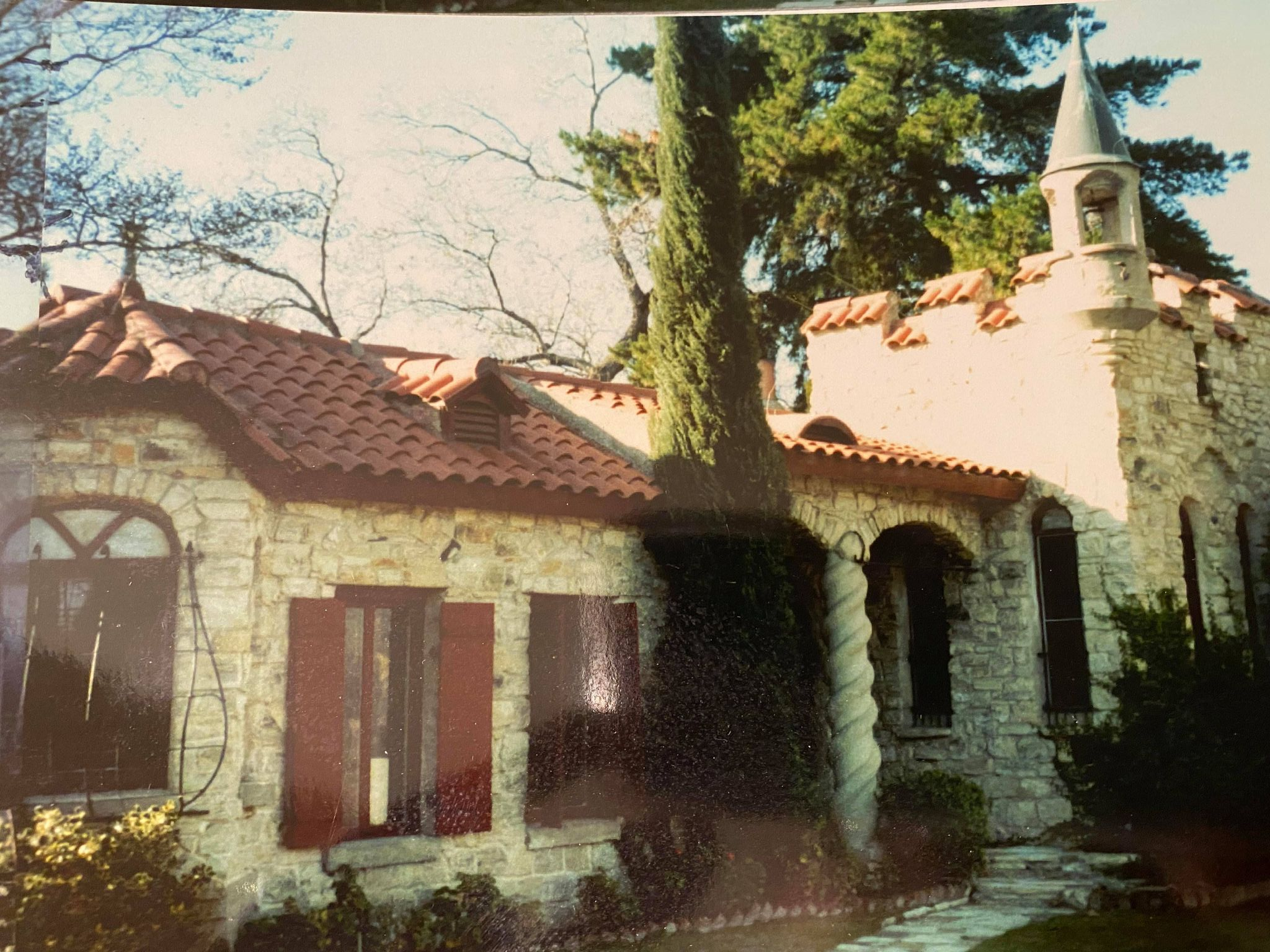
A photo of the Owensmouth Castle taken in the early 1990s.

Frank Knapp's father, Franz ("Frank") John Knapp Sr. walked across the country from Derry, Pennsylvania, and settled in Owensmouth, California, around 1911. He became a naturalized US citizen in 1913.

Owensmouth was a rural area in the San Fernando Valley annexed into the city of Los Angeles in 1915. Owensmouth was renamed Canoga Park in 1931.

Knapp Snr. built one of the first houses in the area completed in 1912 (located at Owensmouth Avenue and Cohasset Street). It was later demolished in 1926.

In 1925, Frank Knapp Snr. built a new family home on Owensmouth Avenue (between Sherman Way and Saticoy) featuring elaborate rock work constructed in the style of historic castles from his home country in Europe. Knapp senior was a skilled stonemason. Stone masonry was a family tradition that may have dated back many generations, as the Germanic root word "knap" carried connotations of mining or shaping rock. "The front and back yards were filled with Knapp's artistic masonry including jolly monks, a sundial, detailed nativity shrines, and an eight-foot-winged cement butterfly inlaid with colorful tiles." The locals referred to it as "Knapp Castle". The building was severely damaged by the 1994 Northridge earthquake and was demolished.

Franz ("Frank") John Knapp Sr. died on 21 August 1952

== Frank Knapp ==
Frank John Knapp, Jr. was born on 29 November 1900 in Austria in the town of Schwaz in the state of Tyrol, the third-largest state in Austria. Some records indicate a Swiss heritage but that was a cover to deflect possible anti-German sentiment.

== Marriage 1922 ==
On 16 October 1922, 21-year old Frank Knapp married 18-year old Florindia "Toots" Olive (16 October 1904 – 13 November 1980). She was of Portuguese ancestry, the daughter of Manuel Olive (1879-1961) and Mary "Mamie" Quaresma (1883-1941).

Frank and Florindia had one child, Edwin ("Eddie") Frank Knapp (1923-1944) who was killed in action during WWII.

== Dry Gulch Ranch ==
In 1943, Frank Knapp purchased the Johnson Ranch where years earlier he had helped to bail hay as a youngster in 1913 for a dollar a day. Frank commented: "In those days there was no relief. If you didn't work, you didn't eat."

He called his new 180-acre property the Dry Gulch Ranch for which he paid $9,500 and paid $75 a year in taxes. It was located west of present-day Valley Circle Boulevard and Kittridge Street in Canoga Park.

Ken Hayden (close friend): "His favorite hunting area was actually the Bell Canyon area near Dry Gulch Ranch in Canoga."

Ken Hayden: "Frank made his fortune digging cesspools by hand and lining them with brick. He invested as much of his money in property as possible. I remember seeing the tripod/winch he used to excavate and load bricks bucket by bucket for the cesspools he built."

Jeff Stalk (journalist): "While digging for water on his ranch in Canoga Park, he struck oil. Geologists investigating the find told Knapp the stones he had pulled out of the well were fossilized whale bones. He sold the oil but still has the bones."

Frank kept a pair of live buffalo at Dry Gulch Ranch which he acquired in a barter exchange for three of his cows. The buffalo bore a 50-pound heifer calf born on the ranch in 1959. Occasionally, Franks pet bison would escape and found roaming freely through nearby residential streets. When his 1600-pound bison named Mr Buffalo Bill got loose it tuned many a head in amazement.

Jon Meyer, said: "When Frank "went bust" at Dry Gulch....it is said he was about to lose the place for non payment of bills....The Jewish Synagogue down on the corner of Owensmouth and Valley Circle made an offer for Dry Gulch and Frank walked away with a check for over one million dollars."

George Raino (ranch hand): "In 1943, Frank bought 180 acres up Dry Gulch, out of Canoga, for 10,000 dollars, and then sold 58 acres in 1962 for 550,000 dollars. He then took that money and bought the Kelly Ranch."

== Knapp Ranch Park ==
In 1961, Frank Knapp sold 57.6 acres of his property to the local city-council for $230,000 priced below its market value. The land was to be used for the development of a public park named in honor of his son killed in action in WWII. The park was dedicated on 11 April 1968 A plaque on public display bears the inscription: "Knapp Park - Named in memory of Edwin Frank Knapp, 1923-1944" (installed by Canoga Park Kawanis Club 1963).

== Horse Meadows ==
When asked to describe his daily life, Knapp replied: "I guess you could call it the life of Riley. I do what I please."

Every year, Frank spent one or two months hunting and fishing at Horse Meadows in a remote area in the southern Sierras to the north west of Roads End on the upper Kern River. There were no roads and you had to bring in supplies using pack horses. Frank would go with various companions, including Frank Dalton (1873 - 1949) and Earl V. Pascoe (1901 - 1994). Frank would also take his teenage son, Edwin, on these expeditions.

Frank built a substantial rock-walled cabin in Horse Meadows some time before 1930.

Jon Meyer, a relative of Frank's second wife, said: "Frank loved the high country and built a cabin at Horse Meadow and would spend weeks at a time there, shooting deer, drinking, and playing cards. Frank also had some sort of mining claim up in Horse Meadow."

== Second marriage 1948 ==
Evelyn Dorothy Nielsen managed a group of cabins at Roads End on the upper Kern River. The establishment was also a horse outfitting operation that serviced the high country in that area. The operation was originally Pascoe's Pack Station established by Earl and Lucille Pascoe in 1922. There were virtually no roads in the back country at that time. Frank met Evie at Roads End on one of his expeditions to Horse Meadows. Evelyn Nielsen (pet name "Evie") became Frank's second wife on 28 November 1948. They were married in Clark County, Nevada. Evelyn helped to manage the property at Dry Gulch.

== Move ==
Ken Hayden (friend): "Our Dad, Charles Hayden helped move Frank to his Gorman ranch from Dry Gulch Ranch (in Canoga Park), starting in 1960. Our Dad had a couple of dump trucks and a skip loader with a trailer. It was a long trek up there back then. I remember Frank telling my Dad that he had to get out of the Valley because there were just too many people there now."

== Animals ==
As with his earlier Dry Gulch Ranch, Frank kept a menagerie of animals on the Knapp Ranch for what he called "atmosphere". Ingrid Burgess, a visitor at Knapp Ranch, wrote: "Frank had a doe that he got as a fawn. The rangers didn't object to him having it, may have even given it to him. It was sick and had diarrhea and "Diarrhea" became the doe's name. It would freely saunter into the house and loved to eat cigarette butts and jelly beans. "Diarrhea" had a son named "Pete", a second offspring was named "Repeat". "Pete" or "Repeat" once reared up against my daughter and pinned her against the house. Catherine still talks about this as the scariest experience in her life." The pet deer were safeguarded during the annual hunting season.

Knapp purchased buffalo from relatives of the late Walt Disney. The bull and three cows he purchased were related to stock at Hart Park owned by the silent film star William S. Hart.

Ken Hayden: "Frank used to catch rattle snakes for UCLA and kept them in a 55-gallon drum in a bed of hay with a heavy wire grate on top weighted down with a couple of concrete blocks, until his favorite horse flipped of the lid and started eating the hay. The horse got bit on the face, so that ended the rattle snake program."

Tom Benz: "Frank would say you can go through my ranch but you better stop and have a couple of beers before you leave. We did, one night I saw a man who just got out of the hospital, he still had the hospital bracelet on his wrist and he could barely stand up he was so drunk. They did party hearty there back in the 1980's. Frank drank his beer with tomato juice and played poker."

Frank Knapp routinely drank "red beer" by mixing in tomato juice or V8 juice. To spice it up a bit, he sometimes added Snap E Tom (which is tomato juice and chile).

Ken Hayden: "He also had an out building filled with Indian artifacts that he had collected from around the area while exploring and hunting on horseback."

Jeff Stalk (journalist): "Knapp has amassed one of the most extensive collections of Chumash and Alliklik (Tataviam) Indian artifacts to be found anywhere. His ranch house is a veritable museum filled with mortars and pestles, stone bowls, flint knives, arrow heads, beads, and other trinkets. Outside, in a nearby shed, milling stones are to be found along with the complete skeletal remains of an Indian."

== Gillette Mine ==
Frank Knapp constructed the barbecue area at the Gillette Ranch in 1928 or 1929 featuring his stonework.

In the early 1920s, Frank Knapp had helped King Gillette, the son of King Camp Gillette of razor-blade fame, in his prospecting efforts in Bear Canyon in partnership with Annie Rose Briggs. Gillette financed the digging of a substantial tunnel that became known as the "Gillette Mine" in an attempt to intersect an old "Spanish" shaft or hidden storage vault. The endeavor failed to find anything.

Years later, Frank Knapp along with two of his younger brothers decided to continue digging the Gillette shaft from where the original team had stopped tunneling. Their point of entry was about 50 feet or so before Gillette's tunnel had ended. They dug down from above in order to enter the tunnel through the roof but found it filled with water. Working around the clock, the three brothers took turns to pump out the flooded void by hand. Eventually they had expelled enough water to wade to the end of the tunnel in waist-deep water. They found old bottles floating around, a stack of shoring timbers, and a drilling rod stuck in the rock face at the end of the tunnel.

The Knapp brothers planned to continue pumping out the water and go back in the next day. However, the tunnel collapsed during the night. They decided to leave well enough alone and dynamited their point of entry shut. In the late 1970s, the forestry covered over the entrance to the mine leaving nothing of the old workings that can be recognized today. Nature, periodic flooding, and time have obliterated all evidence of its existence.

== National Forest ==
George Raino described the fate of the ranch after Frank passed away: "The ranch was then sold by the nephews and nieces to an organization called Friends of the Forest in 1995 bankrolled by Rosie Greer, who was a friend of World Impact, Inc. that owned a camp over by Lake Hughes, for a price of around $400,000. Rosie Greer then swapped the ranch to the forest service for 475 acres of forest service land that abuts The Oaks over in the Lake Hughes / Elizabeth Lake area.' This was facilitated by the Nature Conservancy and made official by a congressional bill. This swap allowed the camp to grow its boundaries onto non-critical habitat, and the Knapp ranch with its spring and critical habitat to be preserved."
