= Derry Area High School =

Location
- 988 North Chestnut Street; Derry, Pennsylvania 15627; United States
- Coordinates: 40.3399°N 79.3125°W

Information
- Type: Public high school
- School district: Derry Area School District
- NCES School ID: 420756004352
- Principal: Casey Long
- Teaching staff: 50.71 (on an FTE basis)
- Grades: 9–12
- Enrollment: 588 (2023-2024)
- Student to teacher ratio: 11.60
- Colors: Blue, Gold
- Athletics conference: Western Pennsylvania Interscholastic Athletic League
- Nickname: Trojans
- Website: hs.dasd.us

Derry Area High School is a public high school in Derry, Pennsylvania, United States. It is part of the Derry Area School District.

== Mission statement ==
"The mission of the Derry Area School District is to develop responsible citizens and life-long learners who are prepared to adapt and succeed in a global society."

== Campus ==
Derry Area High School is located at 988 North Chestnut Street Derry, Pennsylvania 15627. The facility on campus include a baseball field, football field, soccer field, tennis courts, a full weight room, a swimming pool, a high school gymnasium, and the Adams Memorial Library.

== Athletics ==
=== Teams ===
Derry's athletic teams are nicknamed the Trojans and the school's colors are blue and gold. Derry teams compete in the following sports:

- Baseball
- Softball
- Football
- Co-ed swimming
- Co-ed track
- boys' cross country
- girls' cross country
- boys' soccer
- girls' soccer
- boys' basketball
- girls' basketball
- girls' tennis
- boys' volleyball
- girls' volleyball
- boys' golf
- girls' golf
- boys' wrestling

=== State championships ===
- boys' volleyball
  - 1986 PIAA State Champions
  - 1988 PIAA State Champions
  - 1995 PIAA State Champions
- boys' wrestling
  - 1988 PIAA State Champions
