= Benjamin Franklin Bragg =

American physician, lawyer, and violinist

Benjamin Franklin Bragg (21 February 1819 – 29 March 1915) was an American physician, lawyer, and violinist/fiddler born in Arkansas.

Benjamin Franklin Bragg (as physician) appears in the US California Census 1870 in San Bernardino and in the 1880 US California Census in Los Angeles.

Bragg is associated with two legendary gold mines in early Californian history, the Lost Horse Mine (1843 - 1848) and the associated Dr. B. F. Bragg Mine (1876 - 1878).

== Parents ==
Bragg is described as a son of the American Revolution with a notable family lineage. His father was Thomas C. Bragg born on 5 May 1778 in Craven County, North Carolina. His mother was Margaret Taylor Crossland.

== Marriage ==
Bragg married Alice Louella Slosson circa 1884. Alice Slosson was born on 18 October 1868 in San Bernardino County, California.

== Children ==
They had nine children. Their first two sons died in infancy after which they had seven daughters, Alice Messerli Brown (née Bragg) (1886 - 1977), Cynthia Viola Bragg (born July 1887), Lizette Elizabeth Bragg (born 1893), Clarine Ruth Bragg (1895 - 1990), Bertha Louise Bragg (1898 - 1972), Clara Bragg (born 1899), and Edith Beatrice Powell (née Bragg) (1901 - 1997).

In 1891, Alice Bragg and her husband filed for custody of a 13-year-old girl, Florence Slosson, who had run away from home. Florence Slosson was the daughter of Alice's sister, Harriet. The evidence presented in court suggested Florence was in moral danger.

== Arrival in Los Angeles ==
The Los Angeles Herald newspaper names B. F. Bragg checking into the United States Hotel in Los Angeles coming from San Bernardino on 3 July and again on 14 July 1875 Bragg appears to have taken up permanent residence in Los Angeles sometime during the second half of the 1870s.

== Residence ==
According to the publication "Breeder and Sportsman" between the years 1882 and 1889, B. F. Bragg's address was 132 East Pico Street, Los Angeles, California. Bragg and his wife sold this property for $1,398 in October 1896

== Horse Racing ==
In addition to his medical practice, Bragg was involved with horse racing. The following are the names of some of the horses Bragg ran at the track: "Nellie Gray" (October 1974), "Punch the Breeze" (October 1874), "Alice Lee" (December 1886), "General Nesbit" (July 1890), "Lone Star" (August 1890), "Queen Ida" (October 1891).

His horse "Lydia" won "Best thoroughbred mare three years or over" at the agricultural fair in Los Angeles in 1886. His horse "Flora Almont" won best three-year old mare in 1891.

Bragg also sold livestock, particularly young bulls and heifers from the Holstein breed. He placed regular advertisements in the "Breeder and Sportsman" publication between 1882 and 1889.

== Medical license ==
Bragg's credentials as a licensed medical doctor were questioned on more than one occasion. In March 1881 there was a court hearing: People vs B. F. Bragg - practicing medicine without the proper certificate. The case returned a verdict of not guilty.

On 4 March 1881, it was recorded in the minutes of a Californian Medical Society that: "Dr. Kurtz gave notice that he would file a complaint against B. F. Bragg - quack." However the court found Bragg's medical license to be valid.

Again in June 1892, a newspaper article described Bragg as a "a half-breed Cherokee quack" with his title "doctor" placed in parentheses.

== Scandal ==
Bragg was involved in a court case that was a sensation in its day. People of the State of California vs. B. F. Bragg and Esperanza B. De Avila, case # 1090, 16 May 1892. Between March and June 1892, B. F. Bragg was arrested and tried on a felony charge of falsifying a property deed. He had an accomplice, Esperanza B. De Avila charged with the same crimes. Bragg was found guilty and sentenced to five years in San Quentin penitentiary. However, a year after his conviction he was pardoned after new evidence came to light.

Bragg's appearance in court was described in the Los Angeles Herald as follows: "The defendant, Dr. Bragg, sits next to Attorney Williams and looks like a Spanish don with his mustache and Mephistophelean goatee."

"Doctor Bragg is a half-breed Cherokee Indian, who wears enormous gray mustachios and a nine-inch goatee, the effect of which he heightens by the liberal use of mutton suet."

Another reference in the Los Angeles Herald describes Bragg as having an "..extraordinary gray goatee nearly a foot long, and as stiff as a railroad spike by the plentiful application of dry soap."

== Legend of the Bragg Mine ==
Dr. B. F. Bragg Mine
- Location within California

Location
- Location: Bear Canyon, California, United States; 34.677333°N 118.650483°W

Production
- Products: Gold
- Type: Hard rock, descending shaft

History
- Active: 1876 to 1878
- Closed: 1878

Owner
- Company: Benjamin Franklin Bragg

The story goes that in the mid-1870s, Bragg had traveled to Los Angeles to sell thoroughbred horses to Elias Jackson "Lucky" Baldwin who was a prominent California businessman and investor during the second half of the 19th century. Lucky Baldwin is famous for breeding fine racehorses. Baldwin founded the original Santa Anita Park racetrack on his 46,000 acre Rancho Santa Anita estate.

Bragg was approached by a Native American named Soxo who explained he used to work at a gold mine in the 1840s known as the Lost Padre Mine. The Indian offered the doctor a deal. In exchange for two horses, the Indian said he would show Bragg the location of the lost mine.

Together they journeyed to the vicinity of the concealed workings but the Indian did not reveal the hidden entrance to the mine. Instead, he showed Bragg an unworked, gold-bearing seam nearby.

Bragg decided to mine, but there was a complication right from the start. The outlaw, Bronco Charlie Riley, lived in a cabin nearby, so Bragg took the outlaw on board as part of the crew. Together with Soxo and three Mexican laborers (one of them a child), they started to mine in 1876.

Working with hand tools, they dug down on an angle for about forty feet in a vein of decomposing quartz containing pure web and wire gold which became richer with depth.

The miners were paid by keeping what they dug out of the mine on one day of each week. The spoils from the other days were retained by Bragg who owned the mine.

However, as they dug deeper they encountered problems with water flooding the shaft. To deal with this problem, Bragg had a pump made to special order by Fairbanks Morse in New York that could be operated by mule power.

The mining continued from spring to fall for three seasons from 1876 to 1878 until tragedy struck. It is not clear who started the shooting or why, but the only survivors were the outlaw, Bronco Charlie Riley and Bragg who fled the scene on horseback.

It is said the cause of the shootings was a single strike worth $93,000 from a particularly rich pocket. After the murders, the mine was covered over and concealed, and the four bodies disappeared without trace.

The bodies of the four victims were hidden, but not in the mine itself as the legend claimed. Annie Rose Briggs found the skeletons of the four murdered Bragg miners 52 years later in September 1930.

While drunk, the outlaw Riley boasted in public about the incident admitting he carried out the murders. A few days later Riley himself was shot and killed. Without any witnesses, the exact circumstances of his demise are unclear.

The Bragg operation was apparently a rich mine, as records from the old Hellman Bank in Los Angeles are said to have shown Bragg made deposits of around $800,000.

Bragg had become ill with tuberculosis and never reopened the mine. Bragg died in Los Angeles in 1915. Despite his considerable wealth, he is said to have died a "poor man".

== Validity ==
The story of the Dr. B. F. Bragg Mine comes primarily, if not exclusively, from the mining entrepreneur Annie Rose Briggs who staked multiple mining claims covering the entire area where the lost mine was believed to be located.

While considerable detail is known about the life of Benjamin Franklin Bragg, there is nothing to indicate Bragg was ever involved in a gold mining enterprise in Bear Canyon. There is also no hard evidence that the young Annie Rose ever meet Bragg as she claims. Moreover, there is nothing to show the outlaw, Bronco Charlie Riley, was a real person.

There is no mention in the newspapers of the day of four mine workers being murdered at this alleged mine site in 1878. No mention of an outlaw known as Bronco Charlie Riley. Nor is there any mention of the existence of the mine itself.

While Annie Rose Briggs offers a large amount of detailed information about this mining enterprise, no other references can be found in support of the existence of this mine in the historical record. There is a complete absence of cross referencing by any other independent source. Any evidence of the mine's existence, such as it exists, is, at best, highly circumstantial.

This strongly suggests that the story of the Dr. B. F. Bragg Mine is purely legend. The story of the Bragg mine appears to be folklore dressed up as historical fact.

== Death ==
Bragg died on 29 March 1915 in Los Angeles County, California. He was 96 years old. he was buried on 2 April 1915 in the Evergreen Cemetery (Plot: Section B Lot 3742), Los Angeles, California.

His wife died at age 63 on 1 July 1932 in Los Angeles County, California. She is buried at the Valhalla Memorial Park (Plot Fairyland, Lot # 36), North Hollywood, Los Angeles County, California.
