= Annie Briggs =

Annie Briggs may refer to:

- Annie M. Briggs (born 1988), Canadian actress
- Anne Briggs (born 1944), English folk singer, also known as Annie Briggs
- Annie Rose Briggs (1883–1972), gold prospector and mining entrepreneur
