= Frank Patrick =

Frank Patrick is the name of:

- Frank Patrick (running back) (1915–1992), American football player
- Frank Patrick (quarterback) (born 1947), American football quarterback
- Frank Patrick (ice hockey) (1885–1960), Canadian ice hockey player, coach and manager
