= Frank Patrick (quarterback) =

American football player (born 1947)

No. 10
- Position: Quarterback

Personal information
- Born: March 11, 1947 (age 79); Derry, Pennsylvania, U.S.
- Listed height: 6 ft 7 in (2.01 m)
- Listed weight: 225 lb (102 kg)

Career information
- High school: Derry Area (PA)
- College: Nebraska
- NFL draft: 1970: 10th round, 251st overall pick

Career history
- Green Bay Packers (1970–1972)

Career NFL statistics
- TD–INT: 0-2
- Passing yards: 107
- Passer rating: 14.2
- Stats at Pro Football Reference

Frank Andrew Patrick (born March 11, 1947) is an American former professional football player who was a quarterback for the Green Bay Packers of the National Football League (NFL). He played three seasons for the Packers from 1970 to 1972. He played college football for the Nebraska Cornhuskers.

Patrick attended Derry Area High School. He played all-state basketball as well as football at the University of Nebraska–Lincoln. In his sophomore year of college, Patrick passed for 1,449 yards, the most for a sophomore in the Big Eight and 13th in the nation. He set a single-game Big Eight record with 14 of 19 completions in Nebraska's October 1967 game against Kansas State. He played in the position of quarterback for only one year in college, switching to safety, and then to tight end during his senior year. Patrick was selected as a tight end in the 1970 NFL Draft in the tenth round by the Packers, however they used him as a quarterback due to the strike. At 6'7", Patrick was the Packers' tallest ever quarterback.

On August 7, 1971, the Packers faced the Chicago Bears in a pre-season game in Milwaukee, Wisconsin. Playing quarterback for the Packers in the 3rd quarter and with the line of scrimmage near their own goal line, Patrick faded back to pass in his own end zone and, while trying to escape the Bears' pass rush, he accidentally stepped out of the end zone for a safety. The Bears won the game, 2–0.

After the NFL, Patrick opened a life insurance and casualty company in Lincoln, Nebraska.
