= Classic Myths =

1896 children's book by Mary Catherine Judd

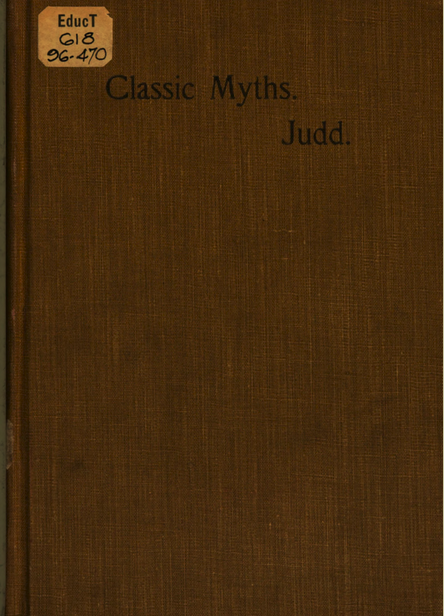
- Cover of the 1896 First Edition
- Author: Mary Catherine Judd
- Illustrator: Angus MacDonall
- Language: English
- Genre: Children's literature
- Publisher: School Education Company
- Publication date: 1896
- Pages: 165

Classic Myths is a children's literature book containing myths retold by Mary Catherine Judd. It was first published in 1896 by the School Education Company of Minneapolis, Minnesota. A second edition of 204 pages, published in 1901 by Rand McNally, included illustrations by Angus MacDonall, with drawings entirely from classic sources.

The book contains classic Greek, Roman, German, Norse, and Egyptian myths. They are told simply so that they can be read by children in the third or fourth grade. The pictures, all taken from classic sources, lend artistry and cultural value to the book. Supplementary reading is furnished in connection with nature study. The hope is that through knowledge of what early peoples thought of natural phenomena and the interpretation they put upon them, the child is led to take a new interest in the world around him.

== Contents ==
=== 1896 edition ===
- Legend of the North Wind
- King Neptune and Winds and Waters
- Echo, the Air Maiden
- Iris, the Rainbow Queen
- Tennysons's Lullaby
- Orpheus, Myth of the South Wind
- The Bag that was a Balloon
- Hail, or the Bird with Arrow Feathers
- Phaeton, Myth of the Sun
- Diana, Queen of the Moon
- The Main in the Moon
- Jack and Jill
- The Evening Star
- The Great King Jupiter
- The Great Bear in the Sky
- The Baby who Made a Harp
- The Linden and the Oak
- How Wednesday, Thursday and Friday Got Their Names
- How Fire Came to Earth
- The Mand and the Boy who Could Fly in the Air
- Juno's Bird, the Peacock
- The Wooden Horse
- The Little Maiden who Became a Laurel Tree
- The Anemone
- Where the Frogs Came From
- The Girl who was Changed into a Sunflower
- The Story of Narcissus
- The Naming of Athens
- Where Language Came From
- Endymion
- One Man Who Had Enough Money
- Old Grasshopper Gray
- Proserpine
- Pegasus
- Baldur, The Good
- The Forget-me-not
- The Oldest Riddle
- The Thunder Storm
- The Story of the Sybil
- The Milky Way
- To the End of the World
- When the Mummy was Alive

=== 1901 edition ===
- How the Horses of the Sun Ran Away
- Woden, God of the Northern Sky
- Jupiter, God of the Southern Sky
- Diana, Queen of the Moon
- Jack and Jill on the Moon Mountains
- The Man in the Moon
- A Story of an Evening Star
- The Giant with a Belt of Stars
- The Great Bear in the Sky
- Castor and Pollux, the Starry Twins
- The Milky Way
- How Fire Came to Earth
- Beyond the Fire Island
- A Legend of the North Wind
- Orpheus, the South Wind
- The Little Wind-god
- The Voices of Nature
- A Bag of Winds
- Echo, the Air Maiden
- Iris, the Rainbow Princess
- The Thunder-god and His Brother
- Neptune, King of the Seas
- Why Rivers Have Golden Sands
- Old Grasshopper Gray
- Where the Frogs Came from
- The Birds with Arrow Feathers
- Why the Partridge Stays Near the Ground
- Juno's Bird, the Peacock
- The Gift of the Olive Tree
- The Linden and the Oak
- The Little Maiden Who Became a Laurel Tree
- The Lesson of the Leaves
- The Legend of the Seed
- The Girl Who Was Changed into a Sunflower
- Why the Narcissus Grows by the Water
- The Legend of the Anemone
- The Mistletoe
- The Forget-me-not
- Pegasus, the Horse with Wings

== Editions ==
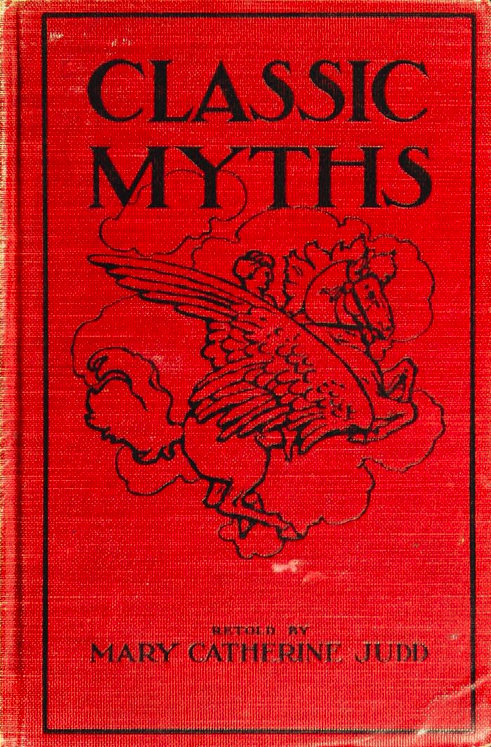
Cover, Second Edition, 1901

The first edition was printed in 1896 under copyright of 1894 by William G. Smith. The second edition was printed in 1901.

== Critical response ==
Pioneer Press:— "It is a charming little collection of nature stories, and will be welcomed by teachers who are trying to work out of the old routine method into better and more inviting ways."

Edward Austin Sheldon, President, Oswego Normal School:— "It is certainly a very beautiful thing. I like everything about it. The type, the character of the matter, the thought that is in it, are all very good."

Minneapolis Tribune:— "The stories are told in a graceful, simple fashion. The teacher finding that her own pupils accepted them and learned the truths conveyed in this pleasant manner, has sent them out to other workers in the same fields. Work of the order in these little books will always find a place."

Minneapolis Daily Times:— "In this day of pretty literature for children, school books have become a work of art and lessons a delight. A Minneapolis teacher has contributed to this vast library for the little ones. The poetic legends are adapted to the understanding of baby minds and are told in an easy, graceful style, free from affectation or pedantry. The simple, dignified forms of speech always associated with ancient myths are constantly observed and suggest that little classic 'Kingsley's Greek Heroes'."

Sophie J. Lewis, Principal, Madison School, Minneapolis:— "I think you have admirably adapted the wording of the stories to the liking of the children. I am having them read and re-produced in the different grades. Each teacher who has been fortunate enough to have the book for an hour or so with her children, has expressed herself as being delighted with it."

John E. Bradley, President, Illinois College: "I have been much interested in looking over the little book of Classic Myths. What a pity that children should spend their time and form their tastes and habits of thought in reading dull sentences. I am sure the use of "Classic Myths" will help the children to enjoy their reading lesson aud that in after years they will look back with pleasure upon the hours which made them familiar with stories and imagery which every well-educated person should know."

William E. Sheldon, New England Journal of Education, Boston:— "I have read the lessons, every one, with care and think them admirably adapted for supplementary reading and for the basis of talks for primary children. They are certainly told in a graceful conversational style and deserve a place on the list of supplementary books for all well-graded primary schools. Your general suggestion for lessons and the specimen you have given on "Wind and Water" seem to me to be beyond criticism, leading the pupil to acquire much useful knowledge and teach correct methods of investigation on a great variety of kindred topics."

James K. Hosmer, Librarian, Minneapolis Public Library:— "I find your little book charming. I think it likely to serve a very useful purpose with children. The myths are re-told with excellent judgment and taste and well adapted to the readers for whom they are intended."

David L. Kiehle, Professor of Pedagogy, University of Minnesota:— "I am in receipt of your little collection of "Classic Myths" for primary grades. The matter is classic, and therefore of universal value. You have, moreover, succeeded in rendering them very readable and intelligible to the children. This is therefore a contribution that I commend heartily to all who are interested in children. By the use of it, they will not only learn to read, but they will acquire a pure taste and a quick imagination. These little stories have a present meaning to children, and besides, as the children grow these stories unfold new views of truth and so are always fresh."
