= Derry Area School District =

School district in Pennsylvania, United States

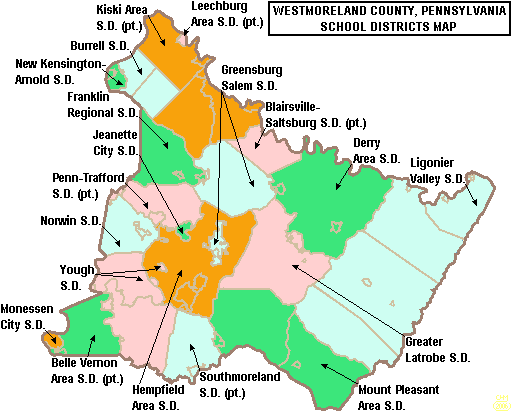

Address
- 982 North Chestnut Street Derry, Pennsylvania, 15627; United States

District information
- Type: Public

Students and staff
- Students: 1,797 (2022–23)
- Teachers: 152.43 (FTE)
- Student–teacher ratio: 11.79
- District mascot: The Trojans
- Colors: Blue and gold

Other information
- Website: www.dasd.us

The Derry Area School District is a midsized, suburban public school district located in Westmoreland County, Pennsylvania. The school district serves the municipalities of Derry Township, Derry Borough and the Borough of New Alexandria. According to 2000 federal census data, it serves a resident population of 18,312 people.

In 2011, the district operated one high school, one middle school and one elementary school all located in Derry Township. The district receives services from the Westmoreland Intermediate Unit. Students in Grades 10–12 in Derry Area have the opportunity to attend the Eastern Westmoreland Career and Technology Center in Derry Township.

== History ==
For many years, the district operated three elementary schools, all located in Derry Township. After the 10–11 school year, Loyalhanna Elementary School (K-1) at 314 Loyalhanna School Road, Latrobe and New Derry Elementary (K-1) located at 314 Pittsburgh Street in New Derry were closed. Faced with steadily declining enrollment, the school board consolidated all elementary students to one school building. Grandview Intermediate School underwent extensive renovations to accommodate the increase of students during the 11–12 school year. It was renamed Grandview Elementary School. Additionally, the school board authorized the sale of Loyalhanna School building.

== District information ==
The school district is approximately 109 square miles in area and is composed of three municipalities, Derry Township, Derry Borough and the Borough of New Alexandria.

== Adams Memorial Library ==
"Adams Memorial Library was completed in the fall of 1954. It currently contains over 100,000 volumes and has topped 300,000 in annual circulation. Special features include the Resource Center library of educational toys and games, where educators and children can find useful tools to make learning more enjoyable. Tracy Trotter is our current director, Karen Herc is Children’s Director, with Jennifer Fetter as Branch Manager of Caldwell Memorial Library."

"In the local community of Derry, Adams Memorial Library has its Caldwell Memorial Library, which was established in 1992 in the Derry Area High School. During the day, the space operates as a school library, and in the evenings and on weekends it transforms into a public library."

The growth of Adams Memorial Library cannot be acknowledged without the help of Robert E. Reed. Upon his passing, Mr. Reed gave the bulk of his estate to the library and two other facilities. The library still uses this money today as a source of funding.

Adams Memorial Library is also funded through the State, Westmoreland County, Latrobe and surrounding townships, school districts, and private grants, including generous donations by the McFeely-Rogers Foundation, the Latrobe Foundation, the McKenna Foundation and the Arnold Palmer Foundation.

"Adams Memorial Library and Caldwell Memorial Library serve the populations of the City of Latrobe, Derry Township, Derry Borough, Donegal Township, Donegal Borough, Youngstown, and New Alexandria."

== Extracurriculars ==
The district offers a variety of clubs, activities and sports.

=== Athletic Teams ===
Sport	Boys	Girls
Basketball	Class AAA	Class AAA
Baseball	Class AAA	
Cross Country	Class AAA	Class AAA
Football	Class AAA	
Golf	Class AAAA	Class AAAA
Soccer	Class AA	Class AAA
Softball		Class AAA
Swimming and Diving	Class AA	Class AA
Tennis		Class AA
Track and Field	Class AAA	Class AAA
Volleyball	Class AA	Class AA
Wrestling	Class AA	

In May 2012, the board agreed to spending on sports facilities. Vasco Sports Contractors of Massillon, Ohio, was hired to recondition the stadium's all-weather track at a cost of $49,953. Additionally, Sturdisteel Company of Waco, Texas, was awarded a $204,500 contract to replace the stadium press box with a new prefabricated steel structure. The press box will be wired for digital access. Mashan Inc. of Home, Indiana County will handle related electrical work at a cost of $613,672. The project was funded from the district's $2.7 million Capital Improvements fund, which got $1.2 million when the district refinanced debt bonds issued in 2002 and 2008 and the interest savings was allocated to the fund.
