= Wigwam Stories =

1901 compilation of Native American folklore and customs

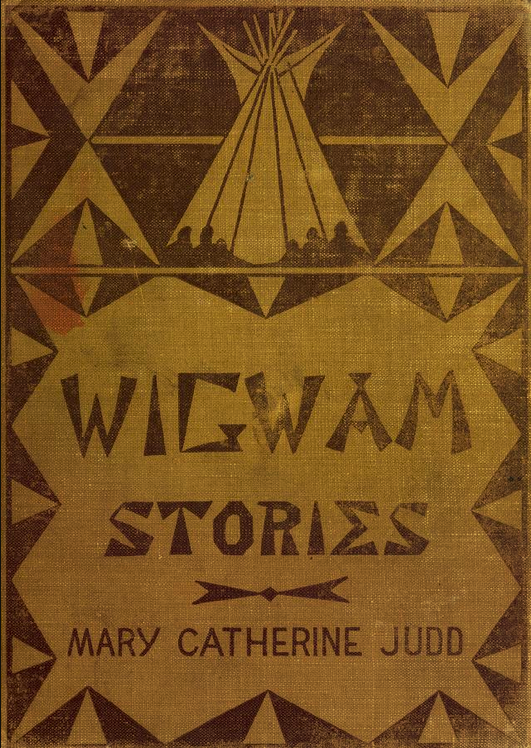
- Cover of the 1901 first edition
- Author: Mary Catherine Judd
- Illustrator: Angel De Cora
- Language: English
- Subject: traditions, myths, stories, folklore, tribal customs, and sketches of Native American tribes
- Genre: Children's literature
- Publisher: Ginn & Company
- Publication date: 1901
- Publication place: U.S.
- Pages: 278

Wigwam Stories is a children's literature book containing traditions, myths, stories, folklore, tribal customs, and sketches of Native American tribes, retold by Mary Catherine Judd. The first edition was published in 1901 in Boston by Ginn & Company.

== Overview ==
The tales were told by Native Americans and compiled by a friend of theirs. The myths which appear in Wigwam Stories are mainly those which refer to nature myths, Judd being guided in her choice by her love for nature which was fostered and encouraged by her work among children while she was a school teacher. The stories were carefully examined by several ethnologists, among them Alice Cunningham Fletcher, a lecturer at Harvard University.

The book was bound in yellow and brown in a design made up of Native American emblems. The work for the covers and for the headings of the chapters and three of the full-page drawings was done by Angel De Cora. The other illustrations were made from photographs selected with reference to sentiment and meaning by students in the several tribes from whom they are taken.

There are translations into Spanish and Norwegian.

== Reception ==
The Chicago Tribune gave the book a mixed review, but was laudatory of the artwork:

Much of the material has been drawn from the same sources that served Henry Wadsworth Longfellow when he was writing Hiawatha, but Miss Judd offers the facts and the stories apparently just as she took them first in her notebook. The traditions and myths which occupy the greater part of the book have all the charm of folklore and fairy tales, but while they are told in the simple, childlike language of the [Native American], the beautiful metaphor and fanciful imagery with which the [Native American] embellishes his language is entirely lacking... The first part of the book, 'Sketches of Various Tribes of North American Indians', reads more or less like an extract from an encyclopedia, but the second and third parts, 'Traditions and Myths' and 'Stories Recently Told of Hiawatha and Other Heroes', cannot fail, because of their subject matter, to be entertaining to the average reader... Several of the illustrations in the book, as well as the cover design, are the work of Miss Angel de Cora, a gifted young Indian artist, thus giving to the pictorial features of the volume an unusually true reproduction of the atmosphere of Indian life.

== Format ==
=== Part I: Sketches ===
- Books in the Indian Language
- Some Things the Indians knew before White Men came
- How the Iroquois built their Log Forts
- Indian Records
- Wampum Money
- Indian Traits
- The Indian's Eye Training
- Medicine Men among the Indians
- The Indian at Home
- Meaning of Indian Totems and Names
- Indian Names for the Months or Moons
- Customs of Kickapoo, Seminole, and Other Tribes
- The Indians who live in Brick Houses
- The Moki Indians
- Dakota or Sioux
- Indian Games
- Sioux and Chippewas of Minnesota
- Chief Logan and Others
- A Navajo Medicine Chant
- How the Cave People found Dry Land on the Earth

=== Part II: Traditions and myths ===
- Iagoo, the Great Story-Teller
- How Clay Dishes were first made
- Leaping Rock in the Pipestone Valley
- The Face of the Great Manitou in the Rock
- How Two Squaws saved their Band
- Origin of the Crane Tribe
- Story of the First Man and Woman
- Giants and Fairies
- Weenk the Sleep-Bringer
- The Little People of the Senecas
- The Hunter who could fly
- How the Bear lost his Tail
- The Blue Heron and the Wolf
- The Little Wolf Brother
- The Good Bear and the Lost Boy
- Legend of Niagara Falls
- How the Indians came to know Medicine Plants
- Mondahmin, who gave the Corn
- The Marriage of Mondahmin
- The Prairie Dandelion
- The Shadow Canoe
- An Indian Temperance Speech
- The Girl who became a Pine Tree
- The White Stone Canoe
- The Great Bear in the Sky
- The North Star
- The Star that never moves
- Trapping in the Happy Hunting Grounds
- The Old Man in the Sky
- Where the Morning Star came from
- The Woman in the Moon
- The Seven Stars of Pleiades
- The Chipmunk s Black Stripes
- The Echo God and the Northern Lights
- Legend of Mackinaw Island
- How the Water Lily came
- The North Wind s Defeat
- A Rip Van Winkle
- Legend of the Wampum-Bird and the Boy
- The Magic Moccasins
- Opechee the Robin Redbreast
- The Indian who married the Moon

=== Part III: Stories recently told of Hiawatha and other heros ===
- Menabozho and his Three Brothers
- Story of the Deluge
- Menabozho caught
- How the Kingfisher got his Ring and his Ruffle
- How the Woodchuck helped Menabozho
- Menabozho swallowed by a Large Fish
- The Thunder-Bird of the Dakotas
- Hiawatha the Wise
- Wampum or Indian Money
- Legend of the Arbutus
- The One who loved him most
- The Marten and the White Rabbit
- How Light, Fire, and Water first came to the World
- How the Copper Mountain came to fall
- The Sun and Moon
- Custer's Heart
