= Mary Catherine Judd =

American author and peace activist (1852–1937)

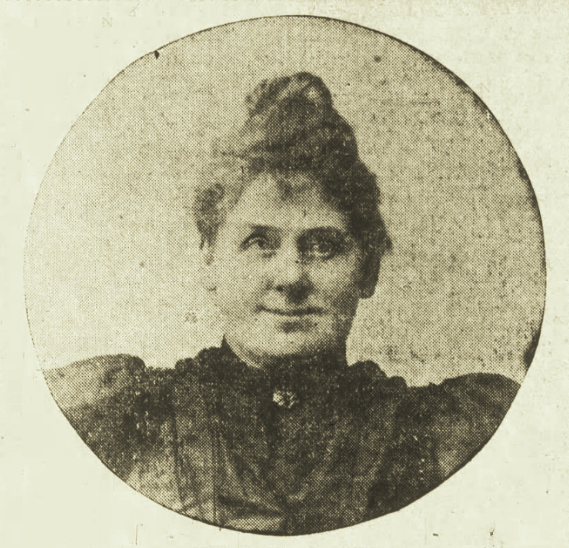
- 1902
- Born: March 12, 1852; Romulus, New York, U.S.
- Died: October 1937 (aged 85); Pasadena, California, U.S.
- Education: Albion College; Whitewater Normal school
- Occupations: educator; author; peace activist
- Notable work: Classic Myths; Wigwam stories
- Political party: Woman's Peace Party

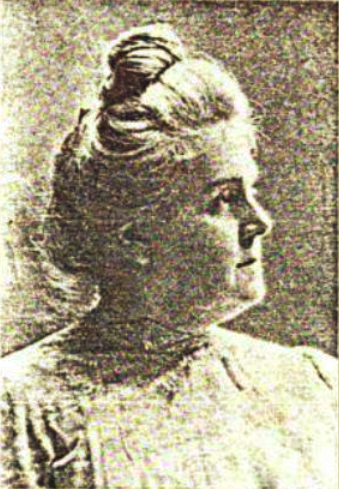
1915

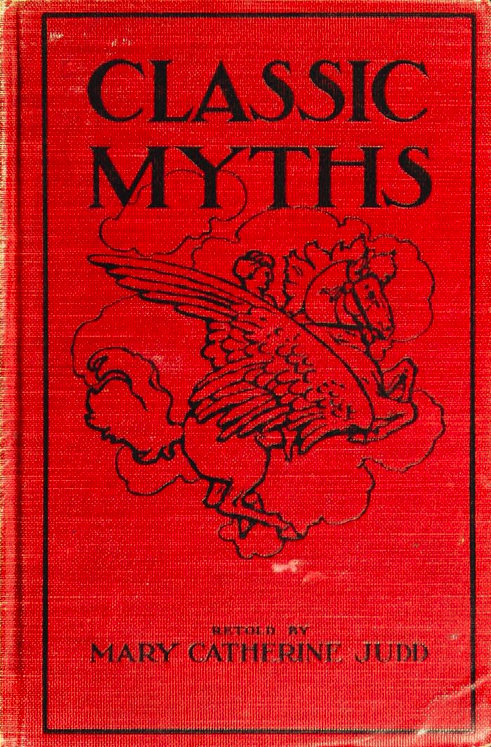
Classic Myths (1901)

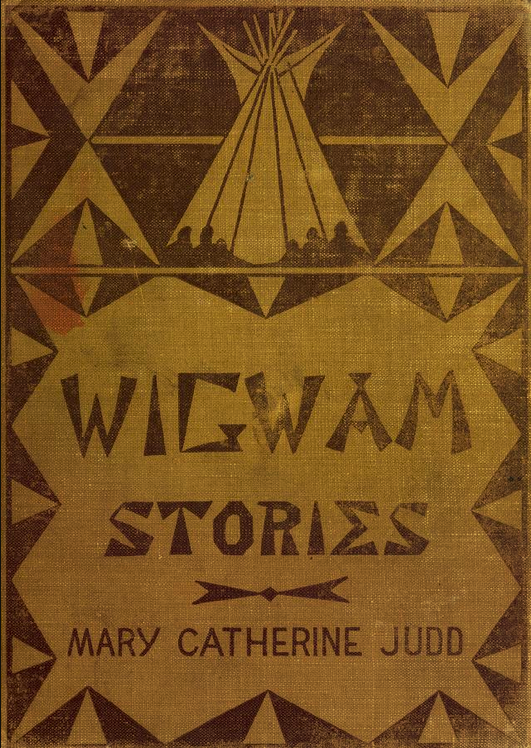
Wigwam stories (1901)

Mary Catherine Judd (March 12, 1852 – October 1937) was an American educator, author of children's literature, and active worker for world peace. Born in New York state, she lived for many years in Minnesota, and in later life, in southern California.

== Early life and education ==
Mary Catherine Judd was born, Romulus, New York, March 12, 1852. Her parents were Edward Ingraham Judd and Mary Jane Wilcox. She descended on her father's side from Deacon Thomas Judd, an English colonist, 1633, Cambridge, Massachusetts, and official in the Colonial assembly of Connecticut in 1639. Through her mother, Judd was related to the Wilcox family of East Orange, New Jersey. Mary Catherine's siblings included: Frances Luce Judd (b. 1845), Richard Wilcox Judd (b. 1846), Eliza Caroline Judd (b. 1847), and Schuyler Judd (b. 1849).

Judd was educated in Union school (Lockport, New York), Albion College (Albion, Michigan), and Whitewater Normal school (Whitewater, Wisconsin).

== Career ==
Judd taught in Wisconsin from 1871 to 1881, in Minneapolis public schools, and was principal to the Lincoln School, Minneapolis, from 1881 to 1903. Judd studied plant, bird, and animal life, and while a teacher, emphasized nature study.

In 1896, Judd's first book, Classic Myths, appeared and was used in schools and children's libraries as one of the popular books of that time. In July 1901, Rand & McNally brought out an enlarged and profusely illustrated edition of Judd's Class Myths. Wigwam stories, Browner Primer, A. B. C. Book of Birds, and Legends of the Rhine followed. Educational articles appeared in periodicals and many short stories were published in larger periodicals. For example, in 1903, the New York Teachers' Monographs published Judd's "The Use of Classic Myths in the Grades". She also wrote poetry.

Since 1911, Judd was an active worker for world peace. In 1913, she was appointed by Jane Addams as state chair of Minnesota's Woman's Peace Party which appointment she held until 1917. She also served as secretary and treasurer of the Minneapolis Peace Society, and vice president of the Minneapolis branch of the American School Peace League. When Jane Addams was appointing delegates to the Hague Peace Conference of April 1915, she named Judd, who was, however, unable to attend. Judd was appointed by Governor Winfield Scott Hammond a delegate to the International Conference of Women Workers to Promote Permanent Peace held at the Panama–Pacific International Exposition in July 1915; it was Judd's intention to urge that this conference take action looking to have a peace emblem placed on postage stamps.

For several years, Judd was secretary of Lewis Parliamentary Law Association and for three years, served as secretary of the Woman's Auxiliary of the Minneapolis Civic League and also as secretary of the Minneapolis Mycological Society.

The Audubon and Nature Study Club of Santa Monica, California was organized on August 6, 1924. Judd, then living in Pasadena, California, was the inspiration and talent of the founding and growth of the organization. Birdwalks were held weekly, co-led by Judd.

In 1932, Judd contributed poems to the Pasadena Writers' Club poetry contest.

== Death ==
Judd died in Pasadena in late October 1937.

== Selected works ==
- Classic Myths. Greek, German and Scandinavian. Retold for second and third reader graders., 1896 (text)
- Classical Myths, 1901 (text)
- Wigwam stories told by North American Indians, 1906 (text)
- Fremont and Kit Carson, 1906 (text)
- A. B. C. Book of Birds, 1916 (text)
- The Palmer Cox Brownie primer, 1921 (text)
- Legends of the Rhine
