= Derry Township, Pennsylvania =

Derry Township may be any of these places in the U.S. state of Pennsylvania:

- Derry Township, Dauphin County, Pennsylvania, contains the community of Hershey, which is home to The Hershey Company
- Derry Township, Mifflin County, Pennsylvania
- Derry Township, Montour County, Pennsylvania
- Derry Township, Westmoreland County, Pennsylvania
