= Annie Rose Briggs =

American gold prospector and mining entrepreneur

Annie Lydia Rose (1883 – 1972) was a gold prospector and mining entrepreneur active between 1910 and 1972 in Bear Canyon and adjoining Pine Canyon in the north-west corner of the Angeles National Forest. She was uncharacteristically bold beyond her age, gender, and the restraints of the late Victorian era in which she grew up. During her life and now through her legacy, she is considered an authority on the legendary Lost Horse Mine also referred to as the Lost Padre Mine.

== Parents and family ==
Her father, William Blackburn Rose (1833–1892), was born in Jefferson, Ohio. Her mother, Anna Rebecca Fink (1849–1936), was born in Hanover, Prussia, Germany and immigrated to the USA in 1864. Annie's father was a divorcee (Fannie Vost) and her mother a widower (Henry Christian Woest). Annie's parents married in Bakersfield on 17 July 1876. Their first son, Robert Fink Rose, was born in Bakersfield on 29 March 1879 and died on 24 August 1885 at age 6. Their next child was William Louis Rose (aka "Billy") born on 12 December 1880 in Bakersfield. Three years later Annie Lydia Rose who was born in San Francisco on 27 December 1883.

Annie had a half brother, Heinrich (Henry) Edward Woest (aka "Eddie") born on 9 April 1872 in Manhattan, New York City. Eddie was from his mother's previous marriage to Henry Christian Woest born in Hanover, Prussia, Germany.

== Rose Station ==
In 1852, Annie's father William Blackburn Rose moved from Jefferson, Ohio, to the new State of California where he worked for a time on the historic San Emigdio Ranch.

What was originally a vaquero camp on the Sebastian Indian Reservation between 1853 and 1875 known as Rancho Canoa (trough) became a stage stop or way station that was established 1858. The route from Bakersfield to Los Angeles via Fort Tejon was 150 miles and took 32.5 hours according to the Butterfield Stage schedule. In 1875, William B. Rose built an adobe stage station at this site as a water and rest stop for stagecoaches on the old Los Angeles-Bakersfield run.

Rose Station was a stockmen's headquarters, post office, and polling place. It was also a trading post and a center for social activities in the Tejon area. It continued operation until 1942.

== Early Residence ==
In 1868, José Juan Lopez built a five-room adobe dwelling to serve as a stopover for herders moving cattle and sheep over the San Joaquin-Los Angeles trail. It was located at what later became the fork of the old Ridge Route and the new US highway 99 near Castaic. Annie's father bought the property and Annie Rose lived there as a child for five years.

In 1886, William Blackburn Rose also homesteaded in Charley Canyon near present-day Castaic.

Annie Rose attended the Castaic School from 1889 to 1895 riding to and from school on horseback despite her young age.

Annie's half-brother Heinrich (Henry) Edward Woest (aka "Eddie"), a commercial bee keeper, homesteaded 160 acres acquired under the 1862 Homestead Act with a patent granted on 30 August 1904. The ranch was located in the northeast quarter of section 22 of township 7 North, range 17 West, San Bernardino Meridian. At first it was called the Cienega Ranch which later became the Kelly Ranch and eventually the Knapp Ranch in 1962. This was another base of operations for Annie during her lifetime and provided access to her mining claims.

== Marriage ==
Annie Lydia Rose married Franklin Adrian Briggs on 9 November 1931. Her husband was born in North Dakota on 22 November 1899 and was 16 years younger than his wife. He was described as tall, thin, frail, and had a cavity in the middle of his chest.

== Treasure Story 1916 ==
Annie introduced her remarkable story in a newspaper article in April 1916. She describes meeting a Dr. Bragg in the mountains in 1901 to whom she gave assistance. She would have been 16 or 17 years old at the time. Bragg told her about a lost gold mine from the 1840s known as the "Lost Horse Mine". Years later on his death bed, Bragg "drew forth the withered parchment (map) and bestowed it as a token of appreciation." (Bragg died on 29 March 1915 aged 96). The story goes on to say that in 1911, the young Annie Rose "relocated the mine and filed two claims, 600 by 1000 feet in area. For two years she did the assessment work, and then lack of capital and her mother's illness forced her to stop. Last year she resumed the work and now has a good title". Annie Rose claimed: "The mine from 1842 to 1848 produced $3,000,000 in gold. Then it was closed by order of the Church and the Indians sworn to secrecy, for California lost it sovereignty and became part of the nation."

== Backstory ==
Lost Horse Mine
- Location within California

Location
- Location: Bear Canyon, California, United States; 34.677333°N 118.650483°W

Production
- Products: Gold
- Type: Hard rock, vertical shaft

History
- Active: 1843 to 1848
- Closed: 1848

Owner
- Company: Mission Santa Barbara

A Native American (Soxo) who worked at the Lost Horse Mine in the mid 1840s made a deal with Dr. B. F. Bragg to show him the location of the Lost Padre Mine in exchange for thoroughbred horses. "The mine had been, according to the story, located in 1840 by an Indian and worked by the mission fathers, who in three years, according to the legend, took out a cool million in gold. But one day the tunnel caved in, burying fifteen Indians, and the rest refused to go back. So the padres filled up the tunnel and concealed the entrance to the mine, which remained lost until the doctor made the deal with the Indian 24 years later. The property was relocated and it is declared Dr. Bragg and his associates took out $750,000 in two years. But death again followed the footsteps of the miners, for an Irish foreman went amuck, killed four men and flung their bodies into the shaft. Dr. Bragg escaped, but the mine was somehow lost again. Just before his death Dr. Bragg told Miss Annie L. Rose, now owner of the property, where the mine could be located."

== 1920s ==
In 1922, the Los Angeles Times newspaper quoted Miss Annie L. Rose as saying she had found the Lost Padre Mine for which she had been searching for 12 years. She said she intended to reopen the mine with a group of investors.

In 1927, it was reported: "Miss Rose interested certain persons of means some two years ago and about $33,000 was expended in cross-cutting with tunnels in an effort to locate the old tunnel. The work suddenly was abandoned." This is a reference to a partnership with King Gillette, the son of Gillette of razor-blade fame. The son, King Gaines Gillette, had become obsessed with finding old Spanish mines and became active in the Bear Canyon area around 1922. It is not clear if his renowned father was a partner in this venture. Prior to this, they had partnered in a joint mining venture in the Rough and Ready district west of Grass Valley through their company, the California Mining Co.

King Gillette hired workers to dig a tunnel that became known as the Gillette Mine although it did not follow a mineralized seam. Gillette's workers tunneled for over a quarter of a mile along the east side of the canyon. They were trying to intersect an old "Spanish" shaft or hidden vault.

The popular film star, Tom Mix (1880–1940), became involved with prospecting efforts in the same area. Mix was the star of hundreds of early Western movies between 1909 and 1935, mostly in the silent film era. He was dubbed the King of the Cowboys during the 1920s.

There is a story that in 1932 King Gillette hired a seer for $100 a day. After 4 days of hiking around the canyon, the mystic shuddered in the middle of a creek bed, and shouted "It's here; the gold is right under us 17 feet down!" Gillette grabbed a shovel and started digging furiously. The mystic then told Gillette, "Stop. It won't do any good. The spirits of four Indians are guarding the treasure, and they'll move it as soon as you get close."

Not long after Gillette had abandoned his project, Annie Rose started working with a new partner: "B. E. Miller of Pomona got in touch with her and formed the Lost Horse Leasing Syndicate, which leased the properly and began to hunt for the mine."

The Los Angeles Times newspaper reported that Annie held 27 mining claims in the north-west corner of the Angeles National Forest. Her half-brother, Henry E. Woest (aka "Eddie"), and her attorney, Gilbert A. McElroy, had an "interest" in some of these claims.

== 1930s ==
In 1930, Annie Rose Briggs was back in the news again and said to be still searching for the lost mine. She had found two skeletons, and in a follow up investigation sheriff's deputies had located two more skeletons. "Remains of the other two men, whose ghosts, legend in the district has it, have stalked the canyon since they were slain there in 1878, were discovered last Saturday by Miss Annie L. Rose, who has devoted twenty years of her life in search for the Lost Padre. Yesterday's success in finding the skulls and several bones of the two other victims bears out the stories that have been current in the mountain fastness for half a century of the quadruple murder and the resultant loss to miners of the location of the tunnel from which came $800,000 in nearly pure gold quartz during two years and $93,000 in one strike on the last day it was worked, the day of the murders."

"Everything went along fine until a man known as "Bronco Charlie" Riley - the bad man of the district - came over from his cabin and saw the golden wealth fairly pouring from the bore. Because he was known as a dangerous man Dr. Bragg let Riley act as superintendent over the Indian and the three Mexicans. He thought by letting Riley in on some of the gold he would not attempt to rob the workings. But on the day the $93,000 was known to have been rained the Indian and three Mexicans disappeared. The story of the mine, the murders, and the vast riches close at hand persisted with Miss Rose, never for an instant doubting its authenticity."

"It was Doc Benjamin Franklin Bragg, an associate of "Lucky" Baldwin of racehorse fame, who revealed to Miss Rose in 1915, before he died, the mine's approximate location. Doc had gained riches in the mine but died a pauper, and was afraid to go back. Miss Rose filed claims on the territory and set to work. Two days ago, digging near the site of an old Indian camping ground, she found the skulls."

"Bragg was skeptical but he also was a gambler. And when he went out to the canyon he took with him three Mexican helpers, one of them a boy. He soon found the mine and a little later the Indian chief anxious to see that the sacred entrance was undisturbed, erected his wigwam half a mile away from Bragg's operations. The mine prospered beyond Bragg's dreams. In two years he accumulated more than $800,000 in gold...fearing his "find" would become public, did not file a claim. His Mexican assistants were sworn to secrecy - and this they were glad to keep because they were making so much money. Only at night did they dare take out the gold from the mine. Everything went well - and then the villain came into the picture. He was Broncho Charlie Reilly, a cattle rustler, braggart and one who was quick on the draw. He wandered one day into the Lost Padre diggings and announced he was on the payroll with all the assurance of an Al Capone. Reilly was determined to have the entire mine for himself. He saw days when in which the yield was about $75,000 worth of gold. So one day, when the day's total reached a high of $95,000, Broncho Charlie, with a flourish of revolvers, demanded the money and the mine. Doc Bragg, realizing he meant business, seized the gold, leaped on his horse and fled."

"Rose said the superintendent, Bronco Charlie Riley, was afraid that the old Indian's death had put a curse on the mine, so he started landslides that obliterated the diggings. He eventually was shot to death after drunkenly boasting in Newhall he had killed the four. Bragg came down with tuberculosis and never could find anyone who believed his story of the mine."

== Prospector and miner ==
Annie Rose Briggs was also an active prospector and miner together with her husband, Franklin Adrian Briggs, and with various partners, helpers and employees over the years. As a teenager, David Wasdahl had worked with Annie and her husband during the winter of 1939/1940. In a letter he sent to the Ridge Route Communities Museum & Historical Society in Frazier Park, CA in August 2007, David recalls: "When I was there with Annie and Adrian we weren't looking for an old mine shaft, instead we were blasting away into a mountain side, pursuing a new mineral outcropping."

== Contract ==
On 16 April 1951, at age 67, Annie Rose Briggs entered into a mining contract with several partners to re-open the historic Lost Horse Mine. The document lists the names of 9 partners in the contract, including Annie Rose Briggs, her husband, Franklin A. Briggs (1899–1962), and her brother, William L. Rose aka "Billy" (1880–1953). Also named in the contract were Jack R. Hill, Palmer C. Ashley, Alfred L. Little, and Howard D. Clark.

The document read in part: "That it is believed to be the reopening of the first of the old tunnels of the Lost Padre Mine. It is our belief that there is Gold stored in this tunnel and abandoned there before 1846."

In this same year (1951), Annie Rose Briggs engaged the services of a bulldozer driver named Glenn McKinney. Using a bulldozer, McKinney cut a road into Bear Canyon from the old Ridge Route and in so doing managed to get a D9 Caterpillar into the canyon. Using it as a prospecting tool, McKinney attempted to uncover the lost mine under Annie's direction.

== Writings ==
Annie Rose Briggs was a prolific writer and described many aspects of her life in the form of well-written poetry and prose. From her writings that were dated, her works appear to have been written in the latter part of her life after 1940 (after age 55). At least 34 examples of her writings (mostly poems) have survived. Most of the stories in her writings are about lost mines and hidden treasure in her area of focus in the north-west corner of the Angeles National Forest. An unredacted compendium of her poetry is expected to be published shortly.

== Entrepreneur ==
The enigmatic Annie Rose Briggs was an energetic mining promoter and, as such, was very influential in attracting potential investors in mining and recovery enterprises. Annie made her living by selling mining leases and setting up investment partnerships. These enterprises were spiced with engaging stories of lost mines and buried treasure.

== Authority ==
"The blue-eyed, gray-haired pioneer has become an authority on Castaic history, not only because of her lifelong residence in the area, but because of personal interest in searching out early-day lore, especially that dealing with a certain, almost legendary, gold mine of fabulous value."

The California Mining Journal in May 1963 attested to the mine's richness: "This monster gold bearing vein was 60% gold." Howard Clark summed up by saying: "Much convincing evidence exists to indicate that the Padre is American mining's richest sleeper". Howard D. Clark, was a well-known author of books on the subject of lost mines in the 1940s.

== Life-long search ==
Annie lived and breathed gold mining and recovery for her entire adult life and was clearly very passionate about her endeavors.

"Sometimes a lost mine is eventually found. Only last year the Lost Padre, also known as the Lost Horse, was rediscovered by Annie L. Rose, who had looked for it since early in the century." Despite repeated claims in newspaper articles since 1915 of her locating the lost mine, there is no evidence that Annie Rose Briggs ever found any such mine.

== Death ==
Annie Rose Briggs died at age 88 in January 1972. She was considered a legend in her own lifetime.

== Legacy ==
Annie Rose Briggs is considered an authority on two historic lost mines, the Lost Horse Mine and the Dr. B. F. Bragg Mine. She spent most of her adult life searching for these legendary mines, although unsuccessfully.

== Validity ==
The validity of Annie Rose Briggs' stories is thrown into question because there is no corroboration of her claims from any other independent source. This whole saga comes from Annie Rose and Annie Rose alone. While considerable detail is known about the life of Dr. Benjamin Franklin Bragg (1819–1915), there is nothing to indicate Bragg was ever involved in a gold mining enterprise in Bear Canyon. And there is no mention in the newspapers of the day of four mine workers being murdered in that area in 1878.

Moreover, there is nothing to show the alleged outlaw, Bronco Charlie Riley, was a real person. There was an outlaw with a similar name active in the San Bernardino area in the mid-1890s. However, his last name was Williams and not Riley and he was a Black man and not a white Irishman.

It appears that Annie Rose Briggs was a mining promoter extraordinaire and a teller of tall tales. Presumably grist for her promotional mill.
