= Derry, Pennsylvania =

Borough in Pennsylvania, US

- Borough
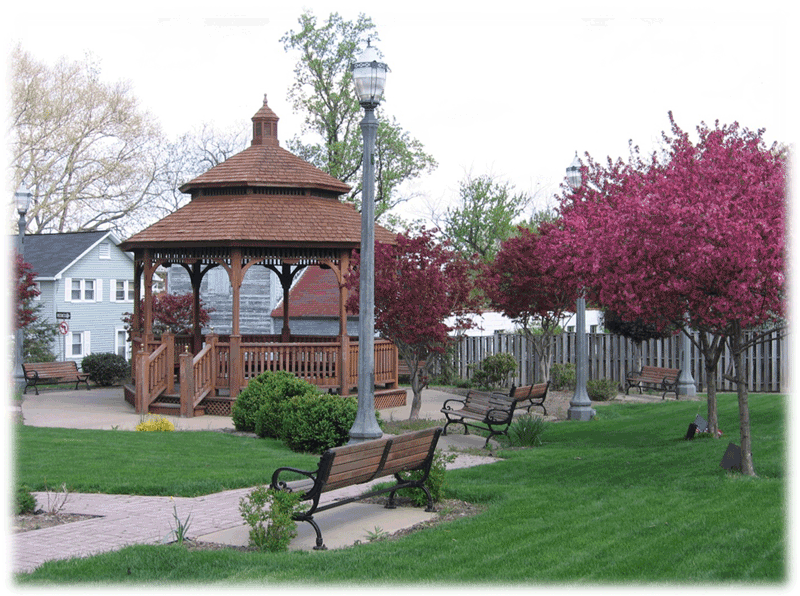
- Derry's Mossback Park on South Chestnut Street in Derry, Pennsylvania

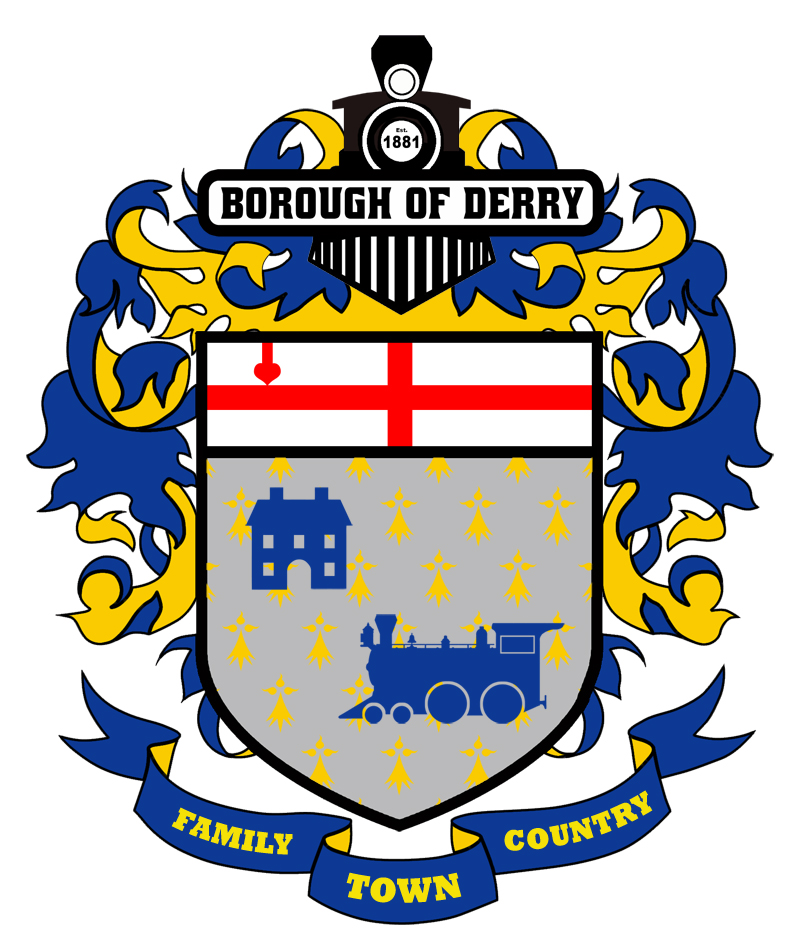
- Seal
- Motto: "Family, Town & Country"
- Location of Derry in Westmoreland County, Pennsylvania (left) and of Westmoreland County in Pennsylvania (right)

- Location within Pennsylvania
- Coordinates: 40°19′59″N 79°18′04″W
- Country: United States
- State: Pennsylvania
- County: Westmoreland
- Settled: 1852
- Incorporated: October 22, 1881

Government
  - Type: Borough Council
  - Mayor-Elect: Nathan Bundy

Area
  - Total: 0.80 sq mi (2.06 km^{2})
  - Land: 0.77 sq mi (2.00 km^{2})
  - Water: 0.023 sq mi (0.06 km^{2})
- Elevation: 1,171 ft (357 m)

Population (2020)
  - Total: 2,639
  - Density: 3,400/sq mi (1,320/km^{2})
- Time zone: UTC-5 (Eastern (EST))
  - Summer (DST): UTC-4 (EDT)
- Zip Code: 15627
- Area codes: 724, 878
- FIPS code: 42-18960
- Website: Borough of Derry, Pennsylvania

There are also four Derry Townships in Pennsylvania.

Derry is a borough in Westmoreland County in Pennsylvania, 45 miles (72 km) east of Pittsburgh. The Borough of Derry, consisting of the town area, should not be confused with Derry Township, which is a separate municipality surrounding the borough. The population was 2,637 at the 2020 census.

== History ==
=== 18th century ===
Derry is said to be the site of a 1791 Indian attack on the Mitchell family, who lived two miles east of Latrobe, "on the line of the Ligonier Valley Railroad." A 17-year-old boy was captured and held by the Indians for three years, after which he returned to his home in Derry.

=== 19th century ===
Originally known as Derry Station, the borough was created in 1852 to serve the Pennsylvania Railroad. It was named after the village on PA Route 982 originally known as Derry and now known as New Derry (even though it is older than the community being discussed here). The original "Derry" in Westmoreland County, Pennsylvania, was named after the City of Derry in Ulster, the northern province in Ireland, because the area’s first non-Native American inhabitants were Scotch-Irish.

Derry was ideally suited for major railroad facilities because of its ready access to water from McGee Run (essential in the era of steam locomotives) and because it sits atop a slight summit along the railroad right-of-way. In Derry's heyday in the late 1800s, it had four hotels, mainly to serve railroad workers, as well as a roundhouse for locomotive maintenance and a massive railroad yard. Derry was incorporated as a borough on October 22, 1881.

=== 20th century ===
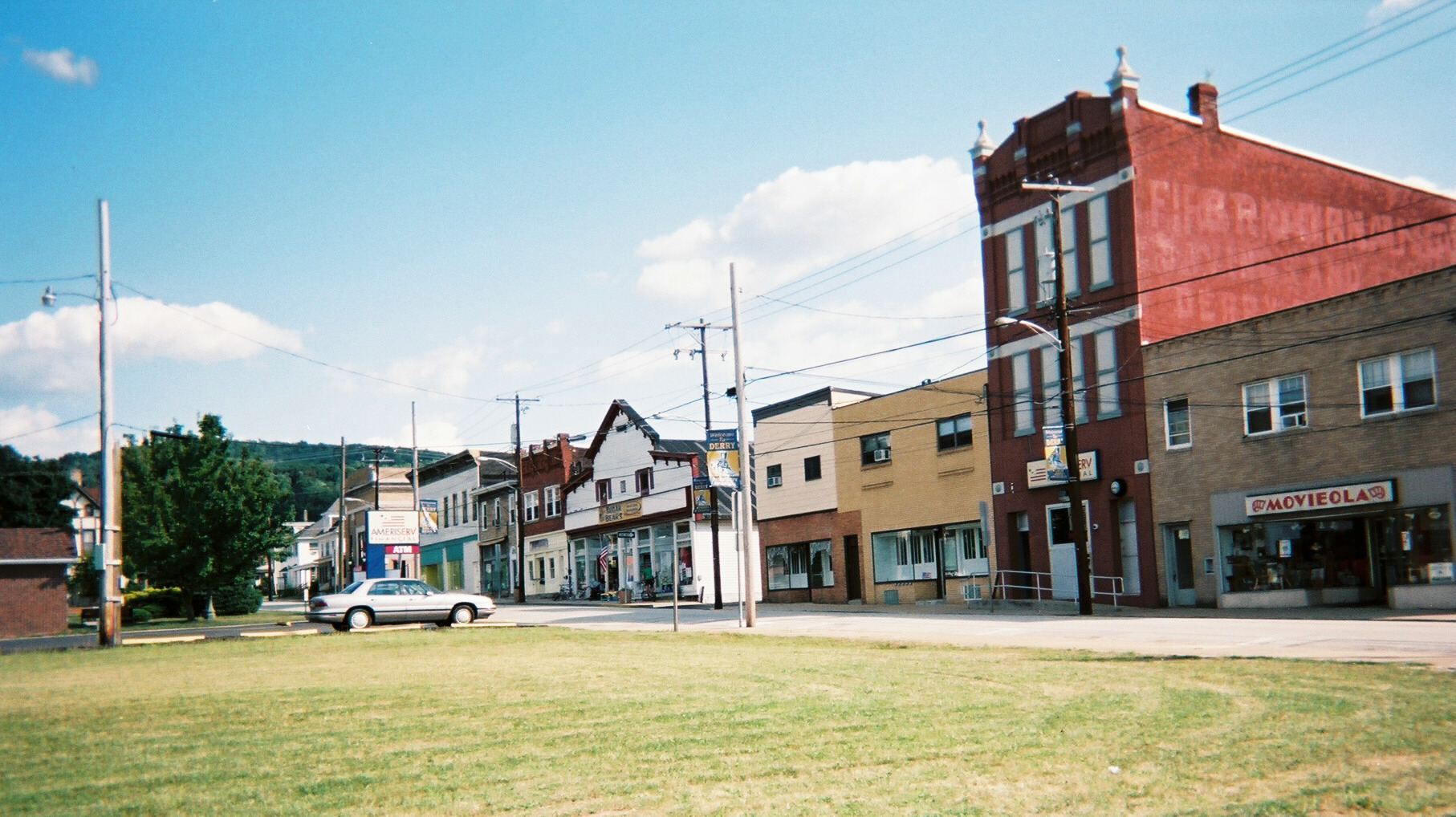
Derry downtown business district

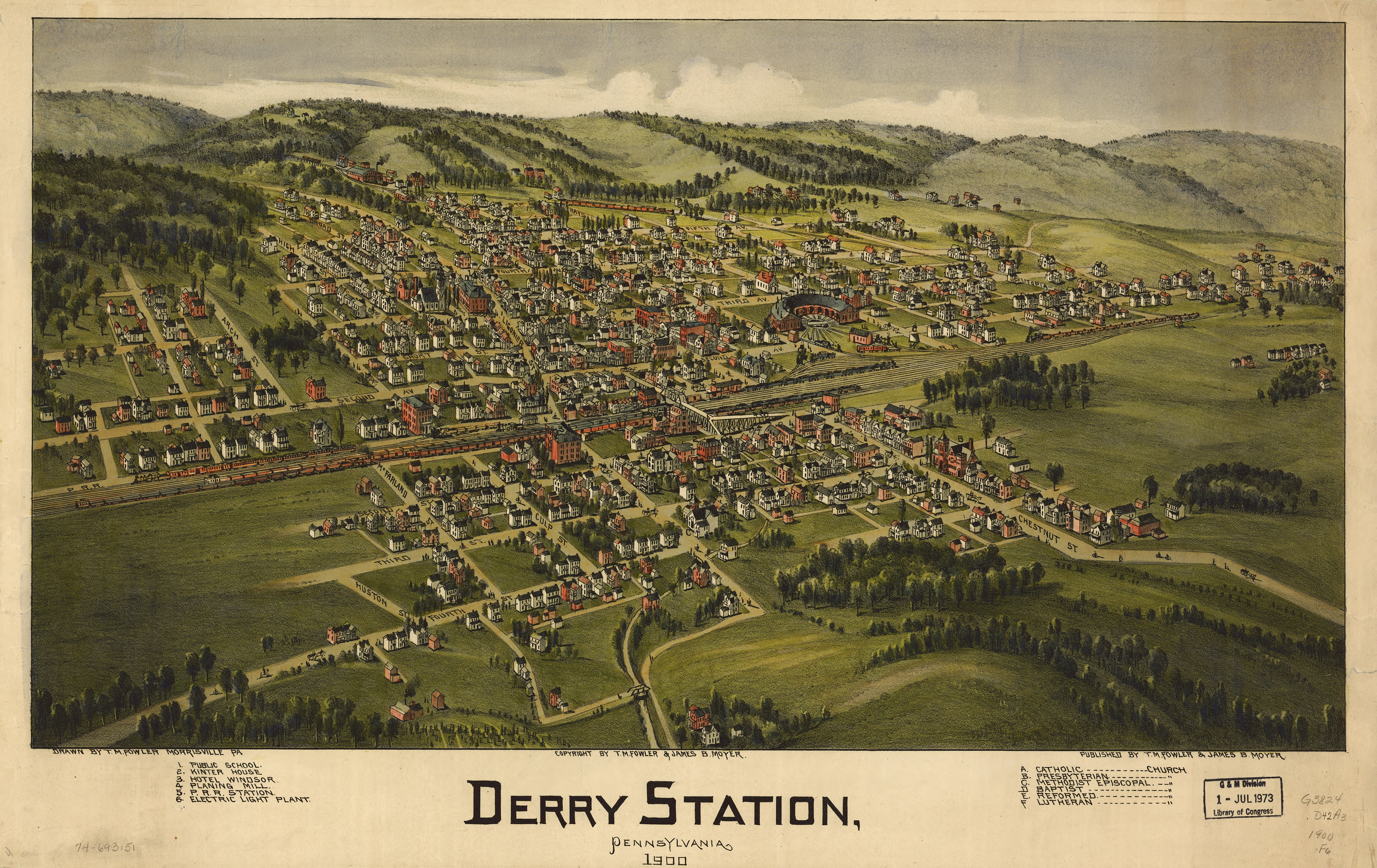
An aerial view of Derry Station in 1900

Derry served as the terminal for Pittsburgh commuter trains until 1964, when the Pennsylvania Railroad ceased operating its commuter service. Railroad Days Festival, held annually, serves to remind residents of Derry's railroading heritage.

Little remains of Derry's railroading boom, although some might notice an unused railroad right-of-way that extends from Derry westward to PA Route 981, running slightly north but parallel to the currently-used railroad tracks. This was an ill-fated project known as the Derry-Donohoe-Jeannette bypass, in which the Pennsylvania Railroad attempted to build a new main line that would avoid the curves and slopes of the existing main line, bypassing Latrobe and Greensburg. Construction of the bypass began in the 1920s, including a large trestle near Bradenville, but the new route was never completed.

Derry and Latrobe were linked by the Westmoreland County Railway Company, which was an interurban operating from 1904 to 1932.

A helicopter crash into a crowd assembled for a festival at St. Joseph's Catholic Church in Derry killed eight people and injured 18 others on Labor Day, 1978. The railroad crossing in downtown Derry has also been the site of other fatal accidents.

== Crest ==
The center of the crest is adorned with St. George’s Cross. St. George was a martyr, one of the most famous in Christendom, and is noted for refusing many bribes and offerings to renounce his faith. He also gave all of his possessions and holdings to the poor. The heart, in the upper left corner of the cross, is sectioned with a bar rising up that signifies love for God.

The lower part of the shield is draped with noble ermine as a backdrop for the two charges that respectfully represent community values and Derry’s rich railroad heritage. The railroad theme is carried on at the top of the design with a crest emblazoned with the borough’s name and establishment date. The decorative foliage around the design is tinted blue for loyalty and gold for generosity. The tincture also represents the local school’s colors and the borough’s commitment to youth and education. The lower banner motto resonates the strong foundation of community reserved for the families that call the borough home and an acknowledgment of the greatness of the country in which Derry is located. The crest portraits a very noble ideal of community, heritage, charity and endless love for God in the face of danger. The crest was designed by Borough Councilman Richard L. Allison (Rick) and enthusiastically approved by the Derry Borough Council as the official crest of Derry, PA. In communication with the Mayor of Derry, located in County Londonderry, in present-day Northern Ireland and in the province of Ulster, it was adjusted to incorporate the importance of railroading in the borough’s growth and how it came to be the largest employer in the borough until the 1950s.

== Geography ==
Derry is located at 40°19′59″N 79°18′4″W (40.333037, -79.301011). According to the U.S. Census Bureau, the borough has a total area of 0.8 square miles (2.1 km^{2}), of which 0.8 square miles (2.1 km^{2}) is land and 0.04 square miles (0.10 km^{2}) (2.41%) is water. It is on the northwest side of Chestnut Ridge, and McGee Run, a tributary of the Conemaugh River, flows through it.

=== Climate ===
The climate in this area is characterized by hot, humid summers and generally mild to cool winters. According to the Köppen Climate Classification system, Derry has a humid subtropical climate, abbreviated "Cfa" on climate maps.

== Demographics ==
Historical population
| Census | Pop. | Note | %± |
|---|---|---|---|
| 1880 | 755 | | — |
| 1890 | 1,968 | | 160.7% |
| 1900 | 2,347 | | 19.3% |
| 1910 | 2,954 | | 25.9% |
| 1920 | 2,889 | | −2.2% |
| 1930 | 3,046 | | 5.4% |
| 1940 | 3,003 | | −1.4% |
| 1950 | 3,752 | | 24.9% |
| 1960 | 3,426 | | −8.7% |
| 1970 | 3,338 | | −2.6% |
| 1980 | 3,072 | | −8.0% |
| 1990 | 2,950 | | −4.0% |
| 2000 | 2,991 | | 1.4% |
| 2010 | 2,688 | | −10.1% |
| 2020 | 2,639 | | −1.8% |

As of the 2010 census, there were 2,688 people, 1,235 households, and 824 families residing in the borough. The population density was 3,696.5 inhabitants per square mile (1,427.2/km^{2}). There were 1,317 housing units at an average density of 1,627.7 units per square mile (628.5 units/km^{2}). The racial makeup of the borough was 99.00% White, 0.64% African American, 0.03% Native American, 0.07% from other races, and 0.27% from two or more races. Hispanic or Latino of any race were 0.47% of the population.

There were 1,235 households, out of which 29.6% had children under the age of 18 living with them, 48.7% were married couples living together, 14.4% had a female householder with no husband present, and 33.2% were non-families. 29.6% of all households were made up of individuals, and 17.2% had someone living alone who was 65 years of age or older. The average household size was 2.41 and the average family size was 2.97.

In the borough the population was spread out, with 24.1% under the age of 18, 6.8% from 18 to 24, 28.6% from 25 to 44, 21.7% from 45 to 64, and 18.8% who were 65 years of age or older. The median age was 40 years. For every 100 females, there were 90.3 males. For every 100 females age 18 and over, there were 87.1 males.

The median income for a household in the borough was $29,785, and the median income for a family was $37,585. Males had a median income of $28,641 versus $21,929 for females. The per capita income for the borough was $15,671. About 10.4% of families and 12.4% of the population were below the poverty line, including 16.1% of those under age 18 and 7.4% of those age 65 or over.

== Notable people ==
- Herbert Boyer, chemist and co-founder of Genentech
- James Patterson, Tony Award–winning actor
- William Julius Wilson, American sociologist and Harvard University professor
