= Cultural depictions of tuberculosis =

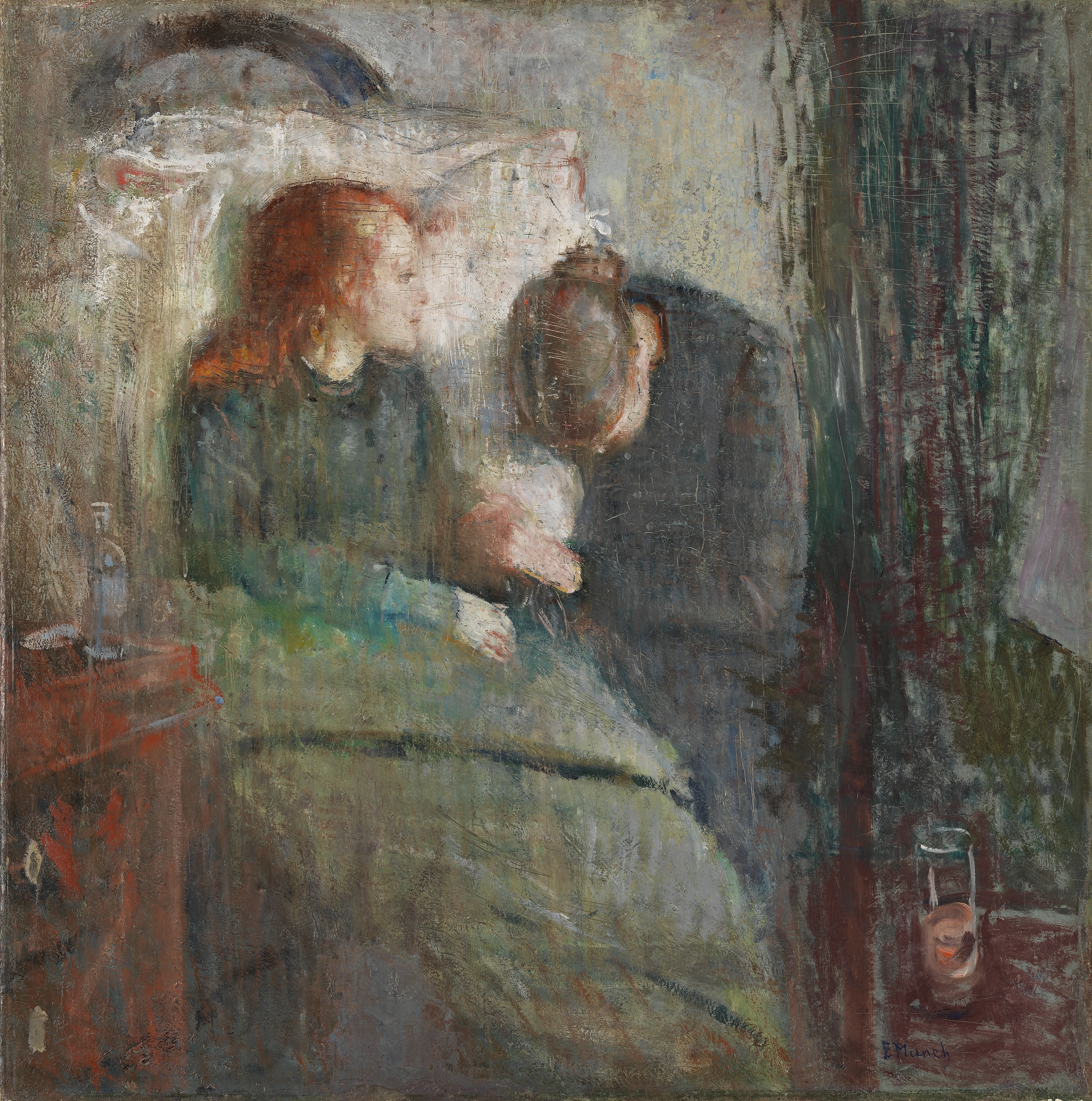
Edvard Munch, The Sick Child, 1885–86, depicts the illness of his sister Sophie, who died of tuberculosis when Edvard was 14; his mother too died of the disease. Nasjonalgalleriet, Oslo

Through its effect on the world's population and major artists in various fields, tuberculosis has appeared in many forms in human culture. The disease was for centuries associated with poetic and artistic qualities in its sufferers, and was known as "the romantic disease". Many artistic figures, including the poet John Keats, the composer Frédéric Chopin and the artist Edvard Munch, either had the disease or were close to others who did.

Tuberculosis has played prominent and recurring roles in diverse fields. These include literature, as in Thomas Mann's The Magic Mountain, set in a sanatorium; in music, as in Van Morrison's song "T.B. Sheets"; in opera, as in Puccini's La bohème and Verdi's La Traviata; in art, as in Monet's painting of his first wife Camille on her deathbed; and in film, such as the 1945 The Bells of St. Mary's starring Ingrid Bergman as a nun with tuberculosis. The disease also appears in fields such as anime and manga.

== Context ==
The poet John Keats, here depicted by William Hilton c. 1822, died of tuberculosis aged 25.

Tuberculosis, known variously as consumption, phthisis, and the great white plague, was long thought to be associated with poetic and artistic qualities in its sufferers, and was also known as "the romantic disease". Major artistic figures such as the poets John Keats, Percy Bysshe Shelley, and Edgar Allan Poe; the composer Frédéric Chopin; the playwrights Lesya Ukrainka and Anton Chekhov; the novelists Franz Kafka, Katherine Mansfield, the Brontë family, Fyodor Dostoevsky, Thomas Mann, W. Somerset Maugham, and Robert Louis Stevenson; and the artists Alice Neel, Jean-Antoine Watteau, Elizabeth Siddal, Marie Bashkirtseff, Edvard Munch, Aubrey Beardsley and Amedeo Modigliani either had the disease or were surrounded by people who did. A widespread belief was that tuberculosis assisted artistic talent, as witness the number of great artists who were affected. Physical mechanisms proposed for this effect included the slight fever and the toxaemia caused by the disease, which allegedly helped them to see life more clearly and to act decisively. In 1680 John Bunyan referred to it as "the captain of all these men of death".

== Portrayals ==
=== Opera ===
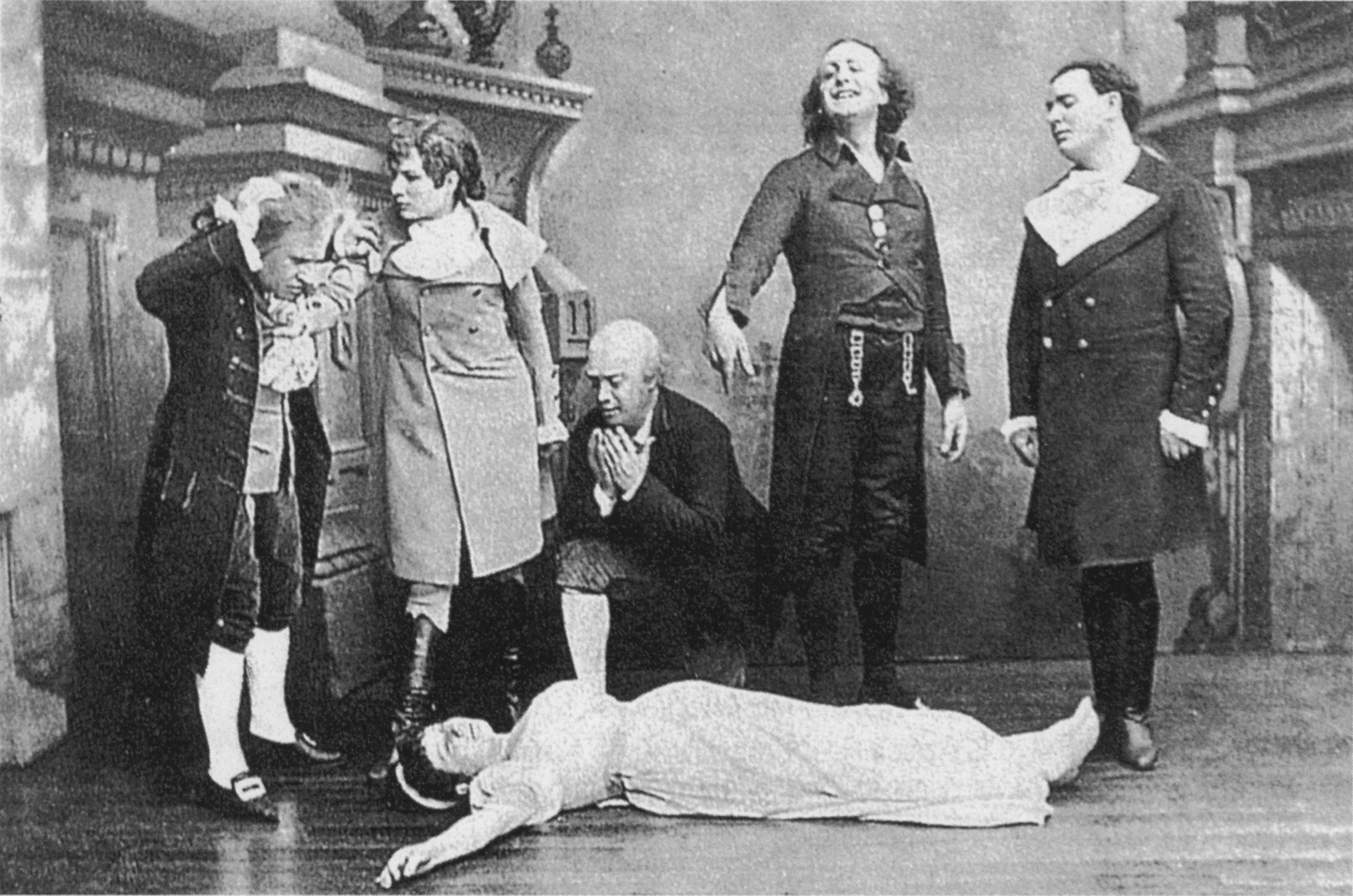
The death of Antonia from tuberculosis in the original 1881 production of The Tales of Hoffmann

Several major operas have exploited the theme of heroines dying tragically of tuberculosis, including Mimì in Puccini's opera La bohème. Giuseppe Verdi's La Traviata features the consumptive Violetta Valéry, based on Marguerite Gautier in Alexandre Dumas, fils's 1848 novel La Dame aux Camélias. In Jacques Offenbach's opera The Tales of Hoffmann, Antonia has tuberculosis and is under the control of a Svengali-like quack doctor who forces her to sing herself to death by conjuring the shade of her dead mother, an opera singer. Numerous stage and film adaptations have been made, usually titled Camille or The Lady of the Camellias in English-language versions, and more loosely, as the 2001 film Moulin Rouge!, where Satine dies of tuberculosis. The real life Paris courtesan Marie Duplessis, the historical Lady of the Camellias, died of the disease at age 23.

=== Theatre ===
A variety of plays have featured the theme of a character dying of tuberculosis. This includes Eugene O'Neill's Long Day's Journey into Night, where the protagonist, Edmund, is diagnosed with tuberculosis at the start of the play; his mental anguish forms a substantial part of the drama.

Chopin and The Nightingale is a dramatic reading with music in six acts by Cecilia and Jens Jorgensen for narrator, two sopranos and piano. It enacts the true-life romance of the composer Frédéric Chopin, who had the disease, and "the Swedish nightingale"—the singer Jenny Lind. (Note: Her nickname alludes to Hans Christian Andersen's story "The Nightingale".)

=== Novels ===
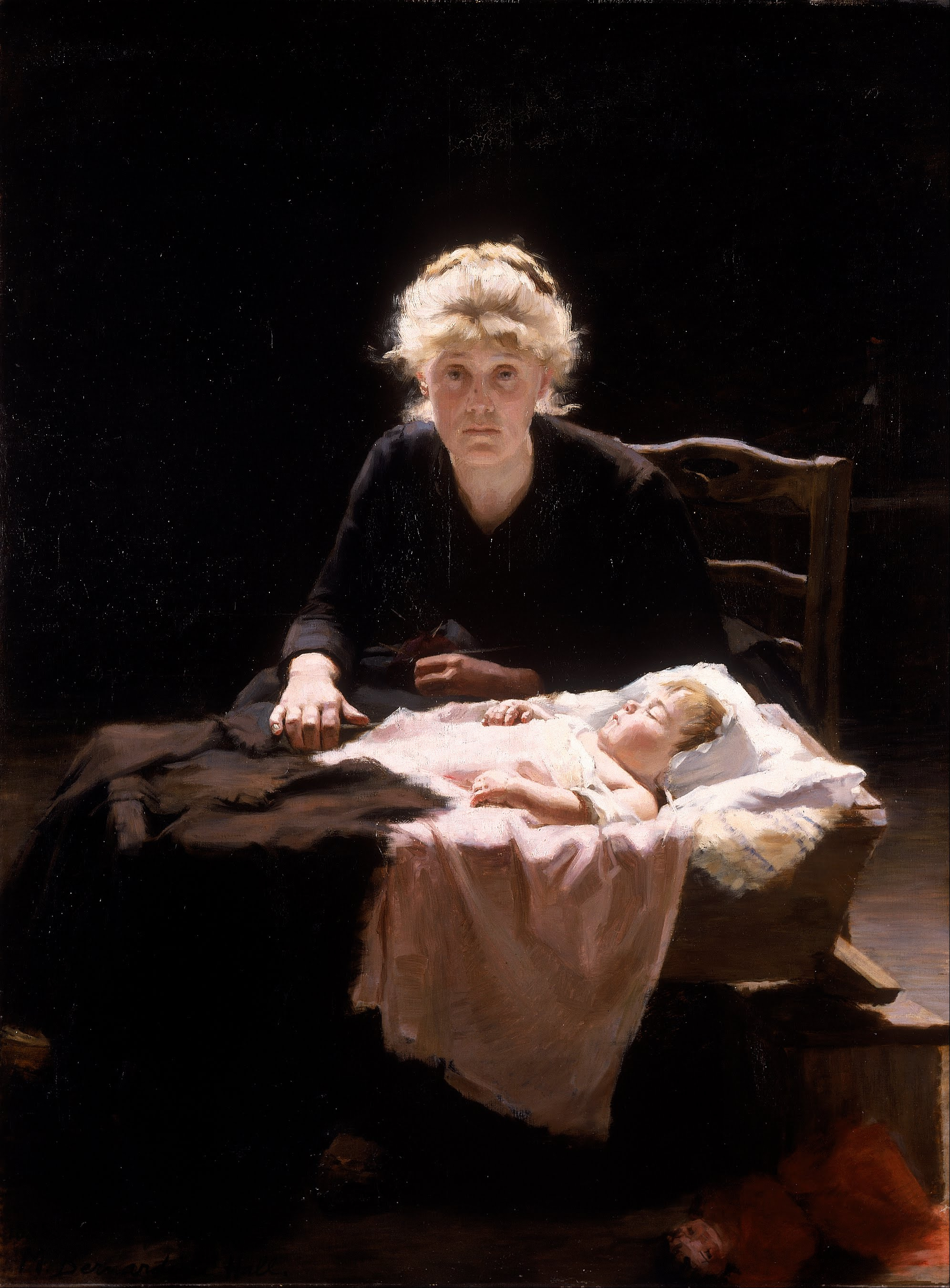
Victor Hugo's character Fantine (in his 1862 novel Les Misérables) with consumption in an 1886 painting by Margaret Bernadine Hall

Nineteenth-century Russian literature frequently made use of characters with tuberculosis. Fyodor Dostoevsky used the theme of the consumptive nihilist repeatedly, with Katerina Ivanovna in Crime and Punishment, Kirillov in The Possessed, and both Ippolit and Marie in The Idiot. In French literature, Victor Hugo used the tuberculosis theme repeatedly: the disease is the likely cause of the spinal deformity of the hunchback in his 1831 novel Notre-Dame de Paris, while Fantine becomes ill and ultimately dies from consumption in his 1862 Les Misérables. The disease appears, too, in English novels of the Victorian era, including Charles Dickens's 1839 Nicholas Nickleby and his 1848 Dombey and Son, Elizabeth Gaskell's 1855 North and South, and Mrs. Humphry Ward's 1900 Eleanor. In American literature, Little Eva dies a romanticised death of consumption over several chapters of Harriet Beecher Stowe's 1852 Uncle Tom's Cabin.

When tuberculosis was essentially incurable, many patients stayed in a sanatorium for long periods. Several novels by different authors have been set in Swiss sanatoriums for tuberculosis sufferers, including Thomas Mann's The Magic Mountain, A. E. Ellis's The Rack, Liselotte Marshall's Tongue-Tied and Beatrice Harraden's Ships That Pass in the Night. In addition, W. Somerset Maugham's 1938 short story "Sanatorium" was set in the north of Scotland (based on his own experience in a Scottish sanatorium in 1919), Camilo José Cela's Rest Home is inspired by his own stay at a sanatorium in Spain, Andrea Barrett's The Air We Breathe was set in upper New York State, and Linda Grant's The Dark Circle was set in the Kent countryside.

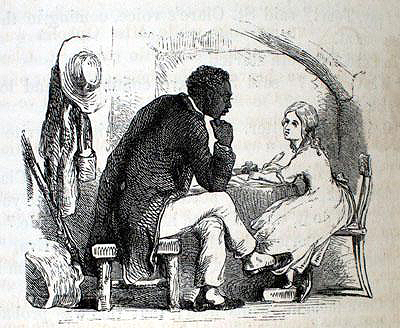
Hammatt Billings's 1853 illustration of Eva, who romantically dies of consumption in Uncle Tom's Cabin

Some more recent novels have tuberculosis as a major plot element. For example, John le Carré's 2001 The Constant Gardener, and its film adaptation, tells the tale of the testing of anti-tuberculosis drugs on unwitting subjects in Africa. In the 1915 novel Anne of the Island, the third in the Anne of Green Gables series, Ruby Gillis, one of Anne's childhood friends, dies of "the galloping consumption". Erich Maria Remarque's 1936 Three Comrades focuses on the heroine's love of life in light of her ultimately futile struggle with tuberculosis.

The disease is not limited to human characters, but can help to achieve grim social realism in a novel. Upton Sinclair's novel The Jungle portrays tuberculosis as common among cattle reaching the meat-packing plants of Chicago. Sinclair wrote that "men welcomed tuberculosis in the cattle they were feeding, because it made them fatten more quickly".

Some novels take a medical point of view on the disease, with doctors as major characters, and sometimes an intense use of medical language and procedure. For example, in A. J. Cronin's best-known novel, The Citadel (1937), made into a 1938 film of the same name by King Vidor, the idealistic protagonist, Dr. Andrew Manson, is dedicated to treating Welsh miners suffering from tuberculosis. He later assists a tuberculosis specialist in successfully performing a pneumothorax on a girl who is dying from the disease. Shame is brought to Sheilagh Fielding's Newfoundland family in Wayne Johnston's The Colony of Unrequited Dreams, as she has tuberculosis even though her father is a doctor.

=== Nonfiction ===
Among the many nonfiction treatments of tuberculosis, Illness as Metaphor by Susan Sontag (1979) compares the metaphorical portrayal of the disease to cancer. In his autobiography Angela's Ashes, Frank McCourt portrays the prevalence and impact of consumption during his childhood in Ireland. In The Plague and I the author Betty MacDonald describes her nine months stay at a tuberculosis sanatorium and tuberculosis treatment in the pre-antibiotics era.

=== Film ===
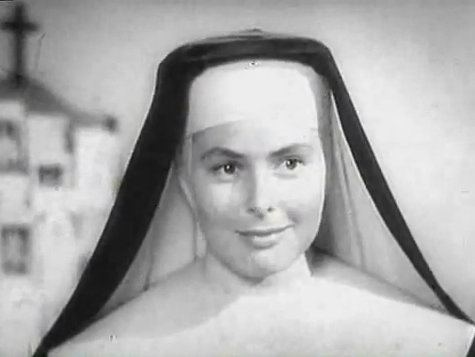
Ingrid Bergman playing Sister Benedict, who contracts tuberculosis in the 1945 film The Bells of St. Mary's

Many films have dramatised the effects of tuberculosis. In the 1936 film Camille Greta Garbo portrays Marguerite Gautier, who dies from the disease. In the 1945 film The Bells of St. Mary's, Ingrid Bergman portrays Sister Benedict, a nun who suffers from tuberculosis. Drunken Angel, a 1948 film by Akira Kurosawa, is the story of a doctor (Takashi Shimura) who is obsessed with curing tuberculosis in his patients, including a young yakuza (Toshirō Mifune) whose illness is being used by his organization as a biological weapon. In the first Zatoichi movie (1962), Ichi's opponent Hirate has the disease, making him wish to die fighting Ichi. In the 1993 film Tombstone the character Doc Holliday is referred to as a "lunger", and tuberculosis motivates his actions throughout the film. He dies of consumption near the end. In the 1994 film Heavenly Creatures, directed by Peter Jackson and based on a true story, Juliet Hulme (Kate Winslet) had the disease, and her fear of being sent away 'for the good of her health' played a large role in determining subsequent actions. Jane Campion's 2009 film Bright Star describes the romantic relationship of Fanny Brawne and the poet John Keats, ending with Keats's death of the disease, aged 25.

=== Fine art ===
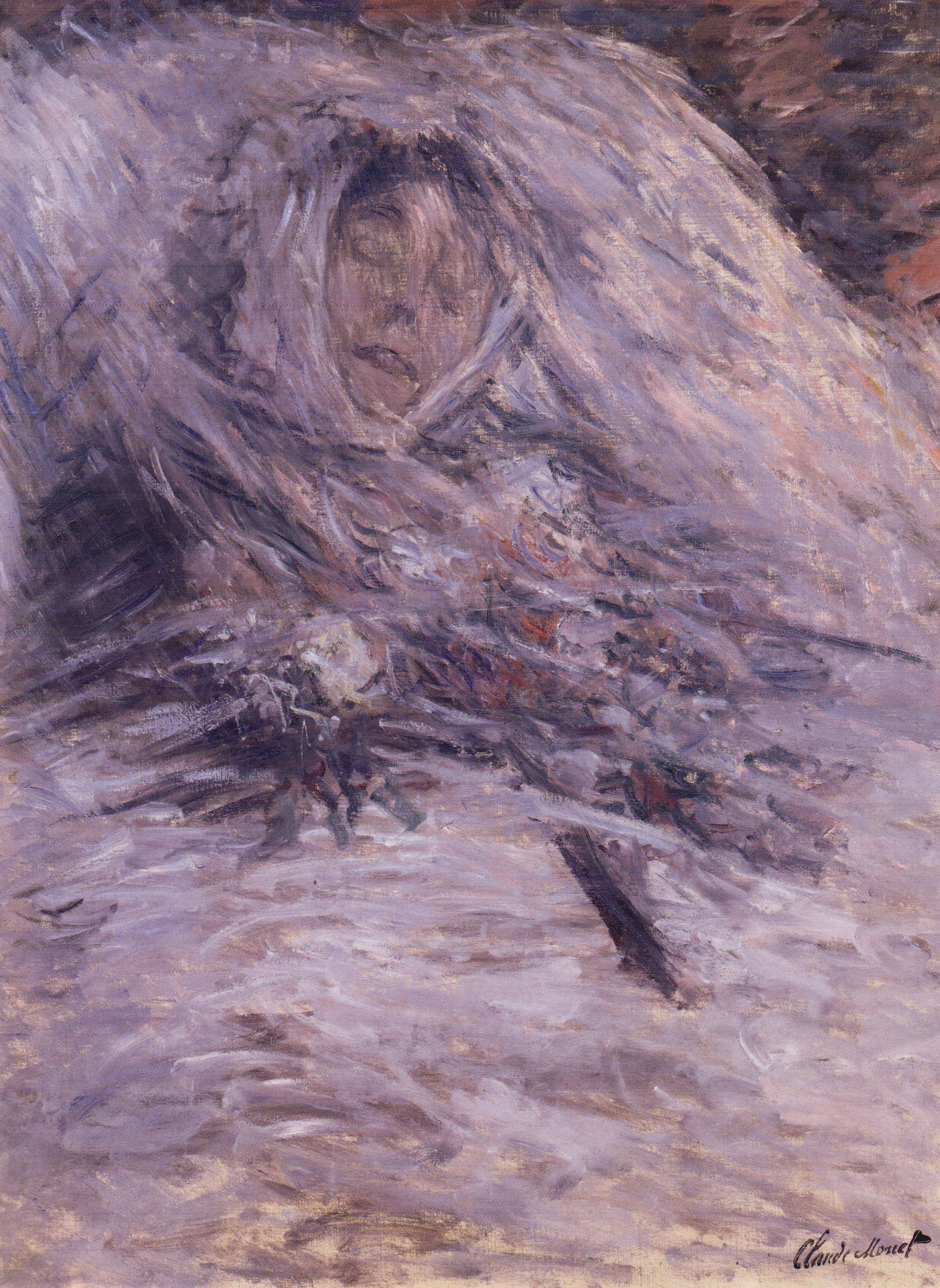
Claude Monet's 1879 Camille Monet sur son lit de mort

Several major artists have depicted tuberculosis from their personal experience. Rembrandt's wife Saskia seems to have died of the disease aged 29; he drew her both when sick and on her deathbed. Edvard Munch returned to the theme many times in his career, including his paintings The Dead Mother and The Sick Child, of his mother and his sister Sophie, both of whom died of the disease. Claude Monet's Camille Monet sur son lit de mort shows his first wife Camille on her deathbed. Eugeen Van Mieghem's Facing Death depicts his wife Augustine lying sick with the disease. Alice Neel's 1940 painting T.B. Harlem depicts a tuberculosis ward in New York.

The permanent collection of the American Visionary Art Museum contains a life-size applewood sculpture, Recovery, of a tuberculosis sufferer with a sunken chest. It is the only known work by an anonymous patient in an English asylum who died of the disease in the 1950s.

=== Music ===
A tuberculosis theme appears in Carl Michael Bellman's 1790 Fredman's Epistles, where the character Movitz catches the disease: Epistle no. 30, dedicated "Till fader Movitz, under dess sjukdom, lungsoten. Elegi" ("To father Movitz, during his illness, consumption. An elegy"), has the lines Movitz, din Lungsot, den drar dig i grafven ("Movitz, your consumption is taking you to the grave"). It appears, too, in American blues music. Jimmie Rodgers (1897–1933), country music singer, sang about the woes of his tuberculosis in the song "T.B. Blues" (co-written with Raymond E. Hall) which he recorded in 1931 at San Antonio, Texas. He also recorded Whippin' That Old T.B. in 1932, but ultimately died of the disease days after a New York City recording session. The tuberculosis theme is reworked in Van Morrison's song "T.B. Sheets", in which the narrator nurses a girl who is dying of tuberculosis.

=== Anime and manga ===
Tuberculosis also appears in anime and manga. For example, an early manga work by the influential author and illustrator Osamu Tezuka is named Tuberculosis. It tells the tale of a boy and his uncle who shrink to microscopic scale to fight the disease inside a child's body.

=== Video games ===
Tuberculosis plays a major role in the 2018 western video game Red Dead Redemption 2. In the game, the protagonist, the outlaw Arthur Morgan, contracts the disease after an altercation with a farmer who had it, while trying to collect his debt on behalf of loan shark Leopold Strauss, giving him only a short time to live following his diagnosis late in the game. Faced with his own mortality, he tries to better himself in the time he has left.

== See also ==
- Human interactions with microbes
