= The Marriage of William Ashe (1916 film) =

- Directed by: Cecil Hepworth
- Based on: The Marriage of William Ashe by Mary Augusta Ward
- Produced by: Cecil Hepworth
- Starring: Henry Ainley; Alma Taylor; Stewart Rome
- Production company: Hepworth Picture Plays
- Distributed by: Hepworth Pictures
- Release date: July 1916
- Country: United Kingdom
- Languages: Silent; English intertitles

The Marriage of William Ashe is a 1916 British silent drama film directed by Cecil Hepworth and starring Henry Ainley, Alma Taylor and Stewart Rome. It is an adaptation of the 1905 novel The Marriage of William Ashe by Mary Augusta Ward.

== Plot ==
An MP marries a Lady. However, he leaves her when she writes a book about him.

== Cast ==
- Henry Ainley as William Ashe
- Alma Taylor as Lady Kitty Bristol
- Stewart Rome as Geoffrey Cliffe
- Violet Hopson as Mary Lyster
- Lionelle Howard as Eddie Helston
- Alice De Winton as Mme d'Estrees
- Mary Rorke as Lady Tranmere
- Henry Vibart as Lord Parham
- Amy Lorraine as Lady Parham
- Fred Rains as Dean Maitland

== See also ==
- The Marriage of William Ashe (1921) a 1921 American film

== Bibliography ==
- Low, Rachael. The History of British Film, Volume III: 1914-1918. Routledge, 1997.
