= Albert Sterner =

American illustrator and painter

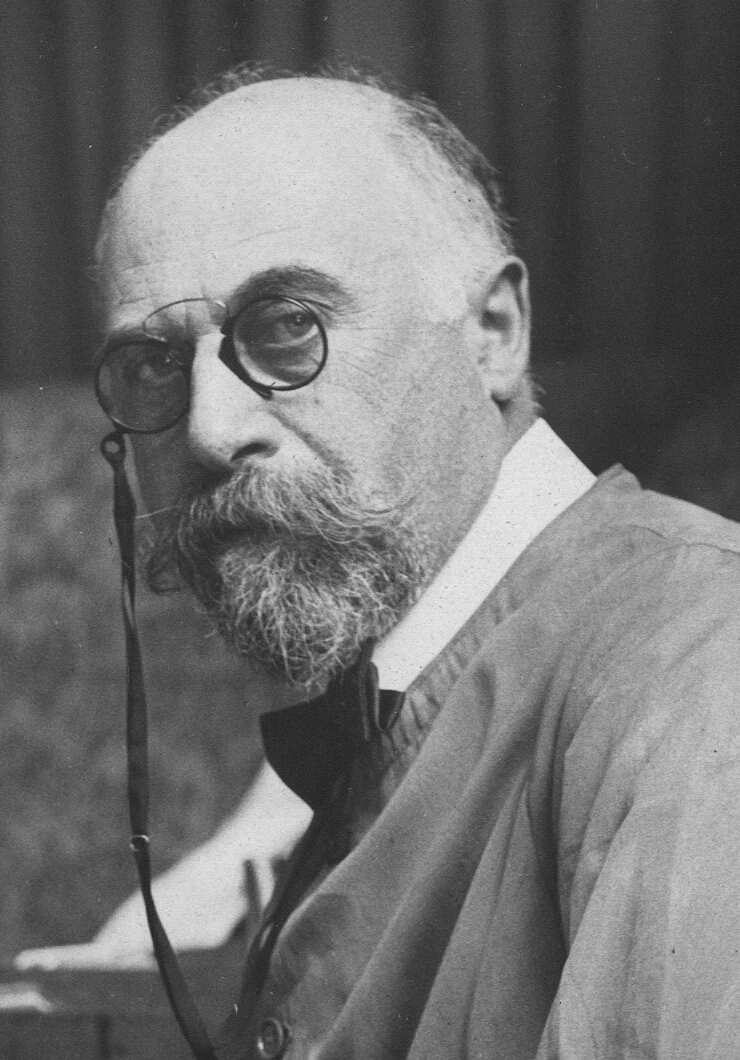
- Born: Albert Edward Sterner; March 8, 1863; London, United Kingdom
- Died: December 16, 1946 (aged 83)
- Education: Académie Julian; École des Beaux-Arts

Albert Edward Sterner (March 8, 1863 – December 16, 1946) was a British-American illustrator and painter.

== Early life ==
Sterner was born to a Jewish family in London, and attended King Edward's School, Birmingham. After a brief period in Germany, he studied drawing in Paris with Jean-Léon Gérôme and Gustave Boulanger. He eventually moved to the United States in 1879 to join his family who had previously moved to Chicago. His brother was the architect Frederick Sterner, who had a career in Chicago and Denver before joining his brother in New York.

== Career ==
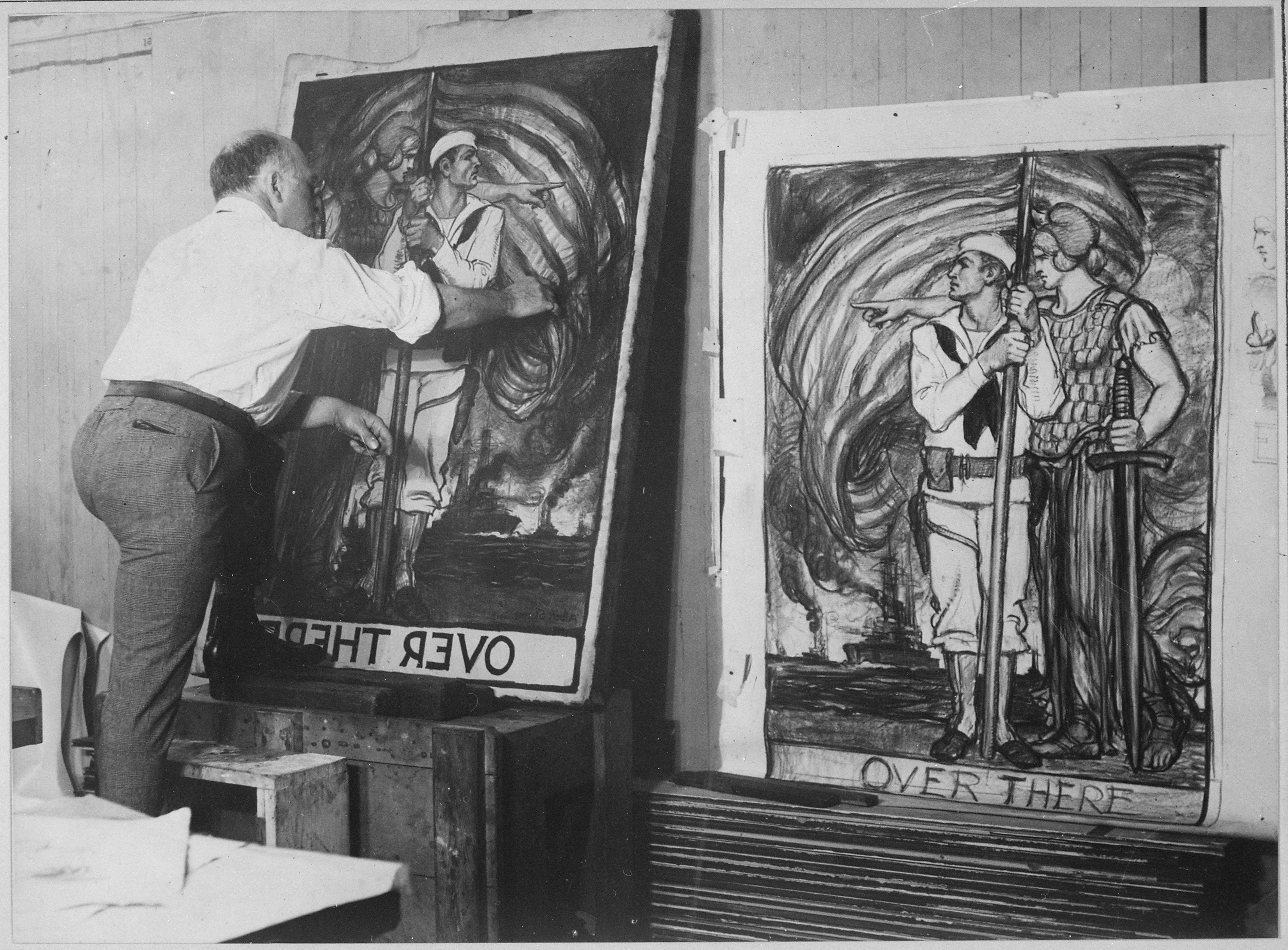
Sterner painting war posters in 1918

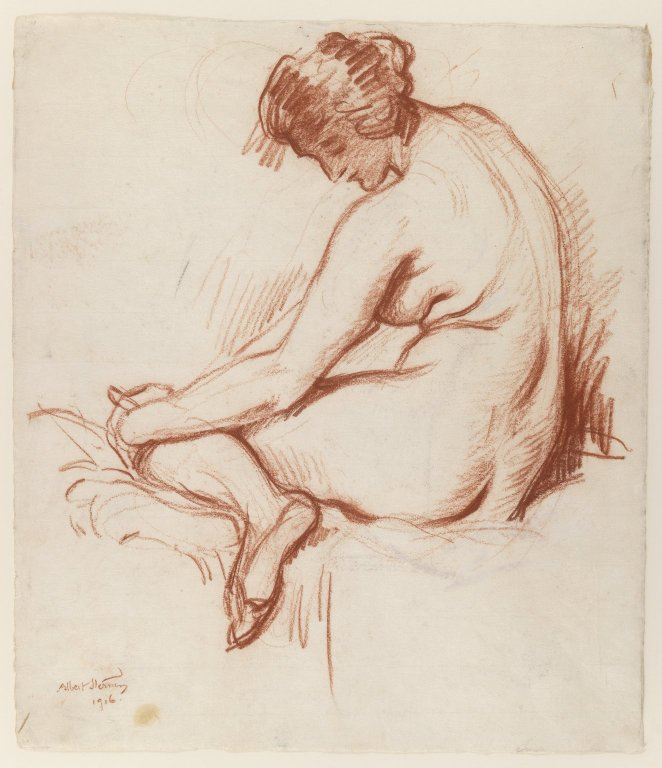
Nude, circa 1916

He began doing lithography, painting, and illustrations. He opened a studio in New York in 1885 and began contributing illustrations to magazines including Harper's Magazine, Scribner's Magazine, The Century Magazine, and Collier's. In 1888 he became a student at Académie Julian in Paris. He has illustrated G. W. Curtis' Prue and I (which established his reputation as a black-and-white artist), Coppée's Tales (1891), Works of Edgar Allan Poe (1894), and Mary Augusta Ward's' Eleanor (1900) and The Marriage of William Ashe (1905). His oil painting The Bachelor received the bronze medal at the Paris Exposition of 1900.

In 1918, he returned to America and began teaching at the Art Students League in New York.

Institutions that have exhibited his work include the Pennsylvania Academy of the Fine Arts, the Carnegie Museum, and the Art Institute of Chicago.

Sterner's awards include the Carnegie Prize at the National Academy of Design in 1941.

His New York Times obituary stated that he was perhaps best known for his portraits, but "he was also noted for his nudes, religious subjects, landscapes, still-life work and, in his earlier days, his book and magazine illustrations."

== Notable students ==
- Elizabeth Cady Stanton Blake
- Jacob Burck
- E. Charlton Fulton
