= Lady Connie =

1916 novel by Mary Augusta Ward

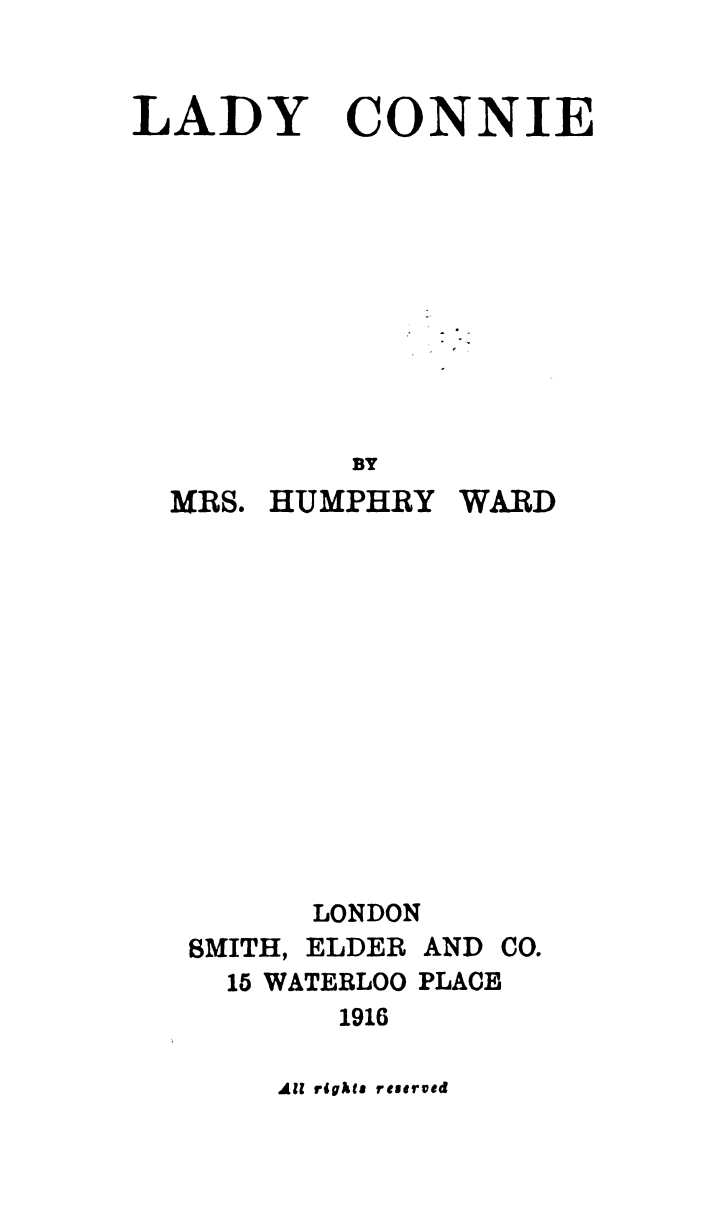
- Title page of the first edition.
- Author: Mary Augusta Ward
- Language: English
- Publisher: Smith, Elder & Co.
- Publication date: 1916
- Publication place: England
- Pages: 429

Lady Connie is a novel by Mary Augusta Ward, first published in 1916.

== Plot ==
The story follows the titled and wealthy Lady Constance Bledlow, or "Lady Connie". After the death of her parents, Lady Connie moves in with her aunt and cousins in Oxford. Expected to adapt to this new society, she is instead dissatisfied with her life, however privileged. She longs for freedom and adventure, and questions traditional gender roles. The author explores Lady Connie's involvement in the suffragette movement, as well as her relationship with men, love, marriage, and social class amidst the changing societal norms of the Victorian era. At the same same, Lady Connie is involved in a love triangle.

== Publication details ==
- 1916 – London: Smith, Elder & Co. (first edition).
- 1916 – New York: Hearst's International Library (first American edition).
- 1916 – Toronto: McClelland, Goodchild & Stewart (illustrated by Albert Sterner).
- 1919 – London: George Newnes.
