= The Marriage of William Ashe =

Novel by Mary Augusta Ward

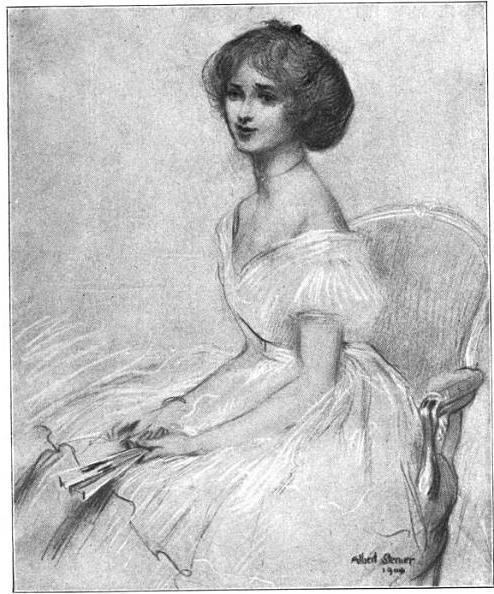
- "Lady Kitty Bristol", frontispiece to novel
- Author: Mary Augusta Ward
- Illustrator: Albert Sterner
- Language: English
- Genre: Novel
- Publisher: Harper & Bros.
- Publication date: March 1905
- Publication place: England and United States
- Media type: Print (hardcover)
- Pages: 563

The Marriage of William Ashe is a novel by Mary Augusta Ward that was the best-selling novel in the United States in 1905. It originally appeared in serial form in Harper's Magazine from June 1904 through May 1905, and was published in book form in March 1905. Illustrations were provided by Albert Sterner.

The novel is loosely based on the lives of statesman William Lamb Melbourne and his eccentric wife Lady Caroline Lamb.

== Plot ==
The novel is a story of English social and political life. William Ashe is a rich, handsome, and successful politician, and heir to the title of Earl of Tranmore. Ashe falls for Lady Kitty Bristol, the eighteen-year-old daughter of Madam d'Estrees, whose charm draws many influential men and overcomes any questions about her reputation. Ashe proposes to her just three weeks after they meet, and she accepts though she warns him that her temper and uncontrollable nature may cause him to regret asking.

Three years later, the couple are settled in London, with Kitty heavily involved in the London social scene. They have one son, who is physically disabled. Kitty's social activities start to affect Ashe's political career; she strains Ashe's relationship with Lord Parham, the prime minister, and also flirts with the dashing but unprincipled Geoffrey Cliffe. After their child dies, Kitty is left a physical wreck and goes with Ashe to Italy to try to recover her health. Kitty meets Cliffe in Italy and runs off with him, while Ashe is in England trying to suppress a salacious book Kitty has written. Two years later, Ashe comes upon Kitty unexpectedly at a small inn in the Alps. Kitty has had many hardships, but dies in the comfort of Ashe's presence.

== Adaptations ==
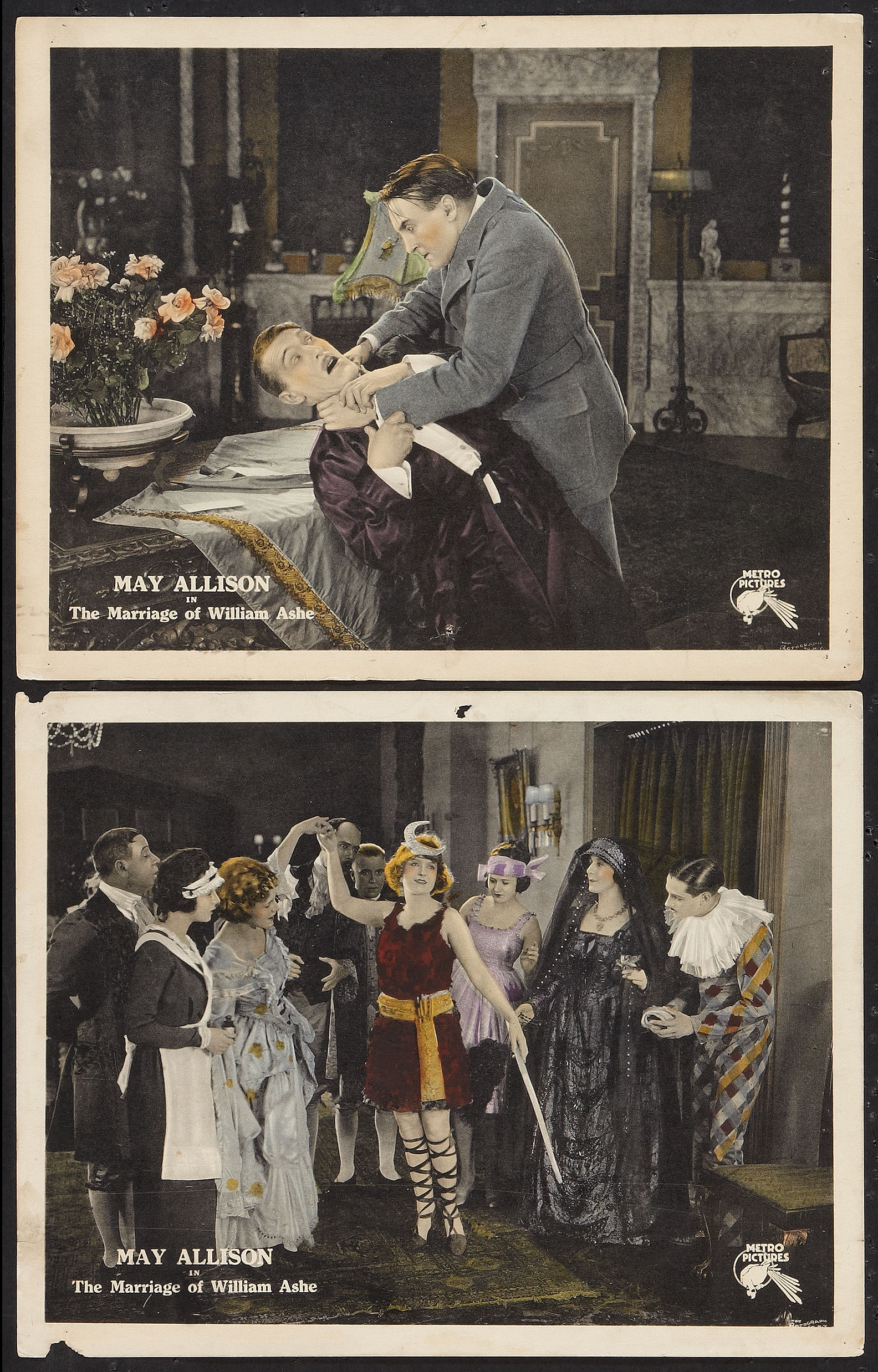
Lobby cards for the 1921 American film.

Margaret Mayo adapted the novel into a play which debuted on Broadway at the Garrick Theatre in November 1905 featuring Grace George and H. Reeves-Smith, and produced by George's husband William A. Brady.

It was first adapted to film in a 1916 British production directed by Cecil Hepworth and starring Henry Ainley as William Ashe and Alma Taylor as Kitty Bristol. A 1921 American silent film adaptation was directed by Edward Sloman and featured Wyndham Standing as Ashe and May Allison as Bristol.
