= Henri-Frédéric Amiel =

Swiss philosopher and poet (1821–1881)

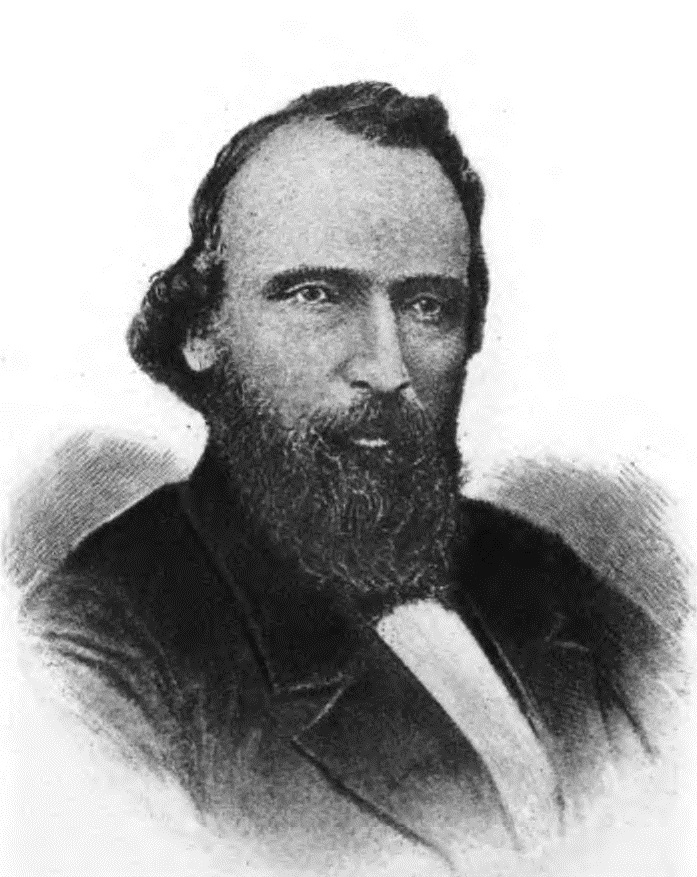
- Amiel, c. 1888
- Born: 27 September 1821; Geneva, Switzerland
- Died: 11 May 1881 (aged 59); Geneva, Switzerland
- Occupations: Philosopher, poet, critic
- Writing career
- Period: 19th century

Signature
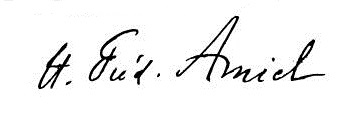

Henri Frédéric Amiel (French: [ɑ̃ʁi fʁedeʁik amjɛl]; 27 September 1821 – 11 May 1881) was a Swiss moral philosopher, poet, and critic.

== Biography ==
Born in Geneva in 1821, Amiel was descended from a Huguenot family that moved to Switzerland following the revocation of the Edict of Nantes.

After losing his parents at an early age, Amiel travelled widely, became intimate with the intellectual leaders of Europe, and made a special study of German philosophy in Berlin. In 1849 he was appointed professor of aesthetics at the academy of Geneva, and in 1854 became professor of moral philosophy.

These appointments, conferred by the democratic party, deprived him of the support of the aristocratic party, whose patronage dominated all the culture of the city. This isolation inspired the one book by which Amiel is still known, the Journal Intime ("Private Journal"), which, published after his death, obtained a European reputation. It was translated into English by British writer Mary Augusta Ward at the suggestion of academic Mark Pattison.

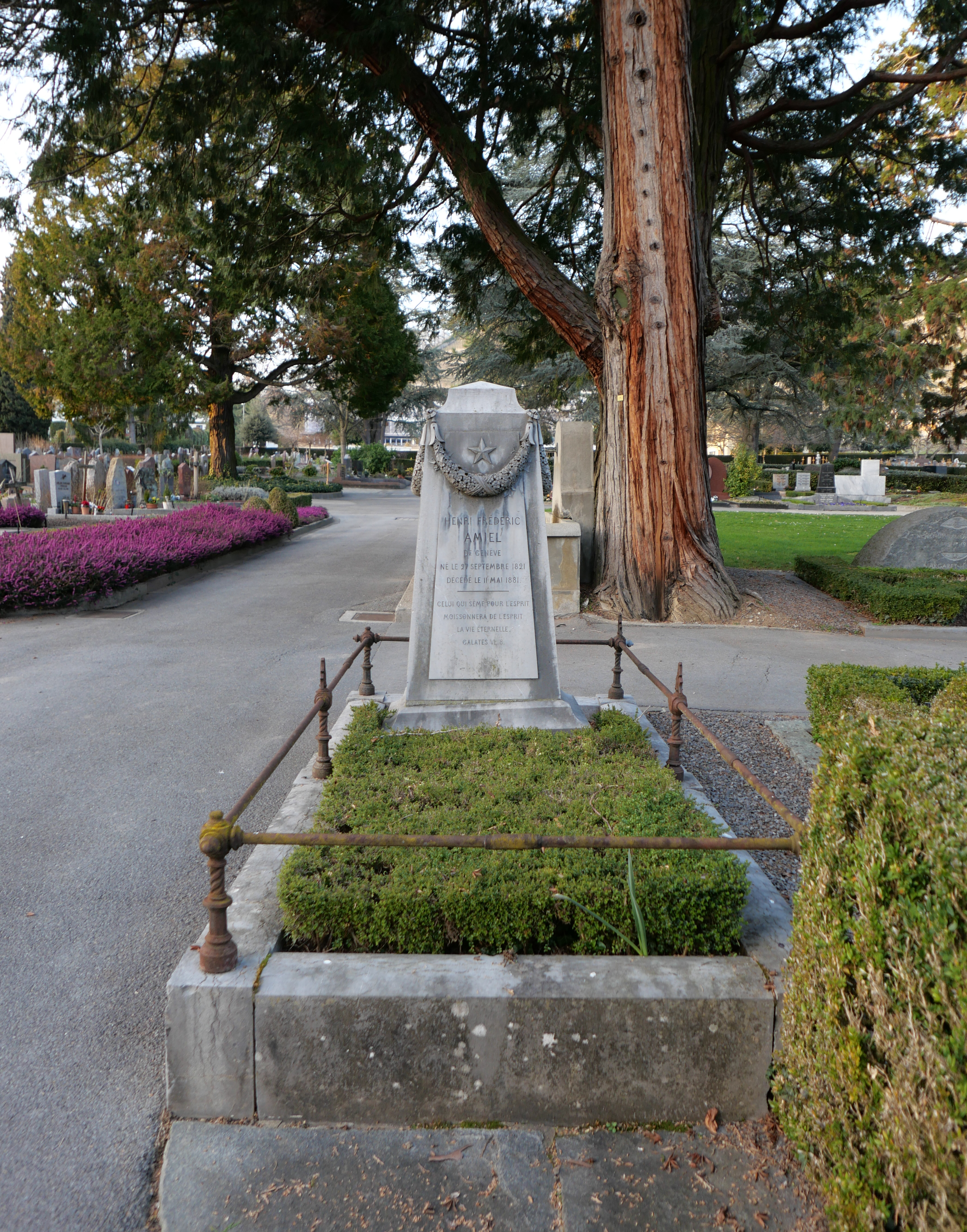
Amiel's grave

Although modest in volume of output, Amiel's Journal gained a sympathy that the author had failed to obtain in his life. In addition to the Journal, he produced several volumes of poetry and wrote studies on Erasmus, Madame de Stael and other writers. His extensive correspondence with Égérie, his muse name for Louise Wyder, was preserved and published in 2004.

He died in Geneva on 11 May 1881, at the age of 59. He was buried at the cemetery of Clarens in the canton of Vaud. The tombstone bears an inscription with a quote from the Epistle to the Galatians 6,8:

"CELUI QUI SEME POUR L'ESPRIT MOISSONERA DE L'ESPRIT LA VIE ETERNELLE." ("whoever sows to please the Spirit, from the Spirit will reap eternal life.")

The French philosopher Ludovic Dugas, in trying to describe a new psychological phenomenon, took the word depersonalization from an entry in his Journal intime, "Everything is strange to me, I can be outside of my body, of me as an individual, I am depersonalized, detached, away". Dugas took this as a literal description, but a few paragraphs later Amiel clarifies: "it seems to me that these mental experiences (transformations mentales) are no more than philosophical experiences. I am not committed to any one in particular".

== Works ==
- Berlin au printemps de l’année 1848 (1849)
- Du mouvement littéraire dans la Suisse romane et de son avenir (1849)
- Grains de mil (1854)
- Il penseroso (1858)
- La Cloche (1860)
- La Part du rêve (1863)
- L’Escalade de MDCII (1875)
- Charles le Téméraire (1876)
- Les Étrangères (1876)
- L’Enseignement supérieur à Genève depuis la fondation de l’Académie depuis le 5 juin 1559 (1878)
- Jean-Jacques Rousseau jugé par les Genevois d’aujourd’hui (1879)
- Jour à jour (1880)
- Fragments d’un journal intime (1884), 2nd ed.
- Amiel's Journal: The Journal Intime of Henri-Frédéric Amiel (1885), trans. by Mrs. Humphry Ward. Description and preview. Macmillan.
- Philine (1927)
- Lettres de jeunesse (1904)
- Essais, critiques (1931)

== See also ==
- Henri-Frédéric Amiel - Wikiquote (external link)
