= Helbeck of Bannisdale =

1898 novel by Mary Augusta Ward

- Title page for Helbeck of Bannisdale (1898)
- Author: Mary Augusta Ward
- Language: English
- Publisher: Smith, Elder & Co.
- Publication date: 1898
- Publication place: England

Helbeck of Bannisdale is a novel by Mary Augusta Ward, first published in 1898. It was one of her five bestselling novels.
