= The Case of Richard Meynell =

1911 novel by Mary Augusta Ward

- Author: Mary Augusta Ward
- Language: English
- Publisher: Smith, Elder & Co.
- Publication date: 1911
- Publication place: England

The Case of Richard Meynell is a novel by Mary Augusta Ward, first published in 1911.
