= Her Lord and Master =

1921 silent film

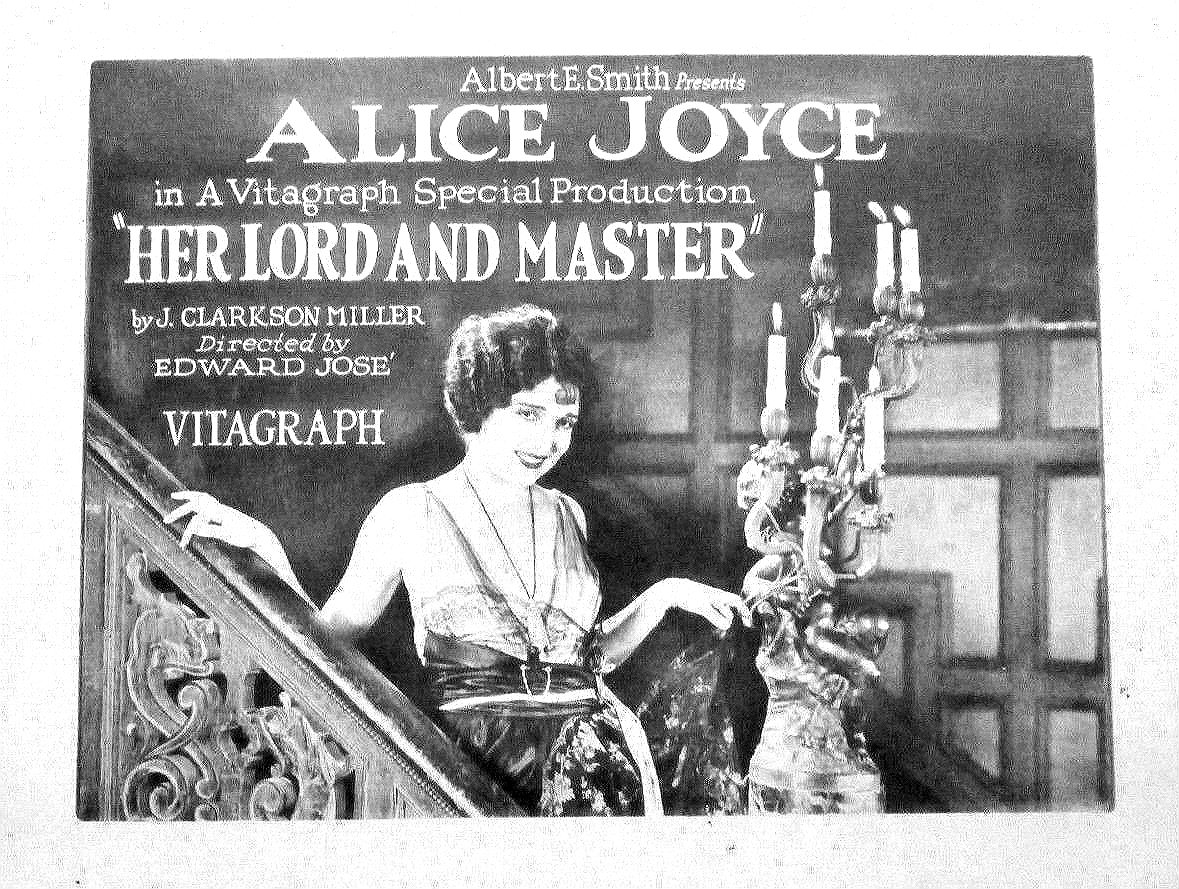
- Directed by: Edward José
- Written by: Martha Morton (play); J. Clarkson Miller
- Starring: Alice Joyce; Holmes Herbert; Frank Sheridan
- Cinematography: Joseph Shelderfer
- Production company: Vitagraph Company of America
- Distributed by: Vitagraph Company of America
- Release date: March 1921
- Running time: 60 minutes
- Country: United States
- Languages: Silent; English intertitles

Her Lord and Master is a 1921 American silent comedy film directed by Edward José and starring Alice Joyce, Holmes Herbert and Frank Sheridan. It is based on the 1902 play of the same title by Martha Morton.

== Cast ==
- Alice Joyce as Indiana Stillwater
- Holmes Herbert as R. Honorable Thurston Ralph, Viscount Canning
- Walter McEwen as Lord Nelson Stafford
- Frank Sheridan as Fred Stillwater
- Marie Shotwell as Mrs. Stillwater
- Louise Beaudet as Mrs. Chazy Bunker
- Eugene Acker as Glen Masters
- John Sutherland as Jennings
- Ida Waterman as Lady Canning

== Bibliography ==
- Goble, Alan. The Complete Index to Literary Sources in Film. Walter de Gruyter, 1999.
