= The History of David Grieve =

1892 novel by Mary Augusta Ward

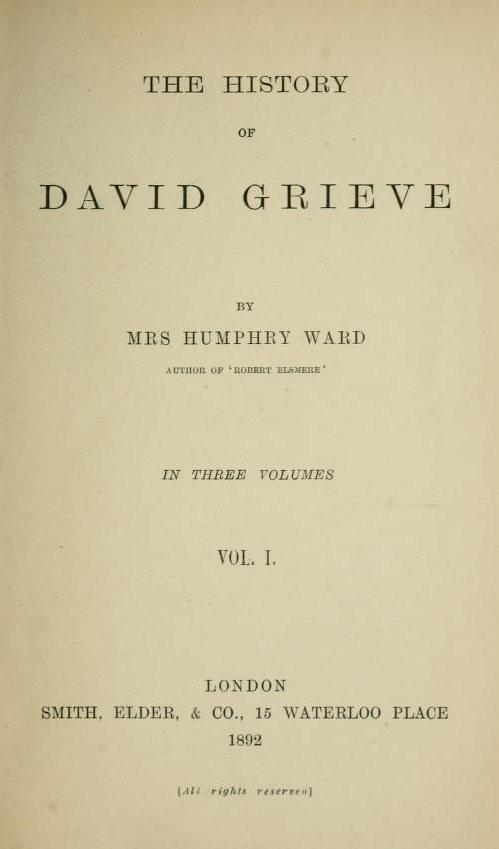
- Title page of the first edition.
- Author: Mary Augusta Ward
- Language: English
- Publisher: Smith, Elder & Co.
- Publication date: 1892
- Publication place: England

The History of David Grieve is a novel by Mary Augusta Ward, first published in 1892. Set in the 1860s and 1870s, the author follows the life of its titular character through four distinct parts: childhood, youth, storm and stress. The book begins with David's youth in rural Derbyshire goes on to his time as a bookseller in Manchester, his experiences and love affair in Paris, and his eventual return to Manchester as a married man. David's sister Louie is a central character.
