= Ida Waterman =

American actress

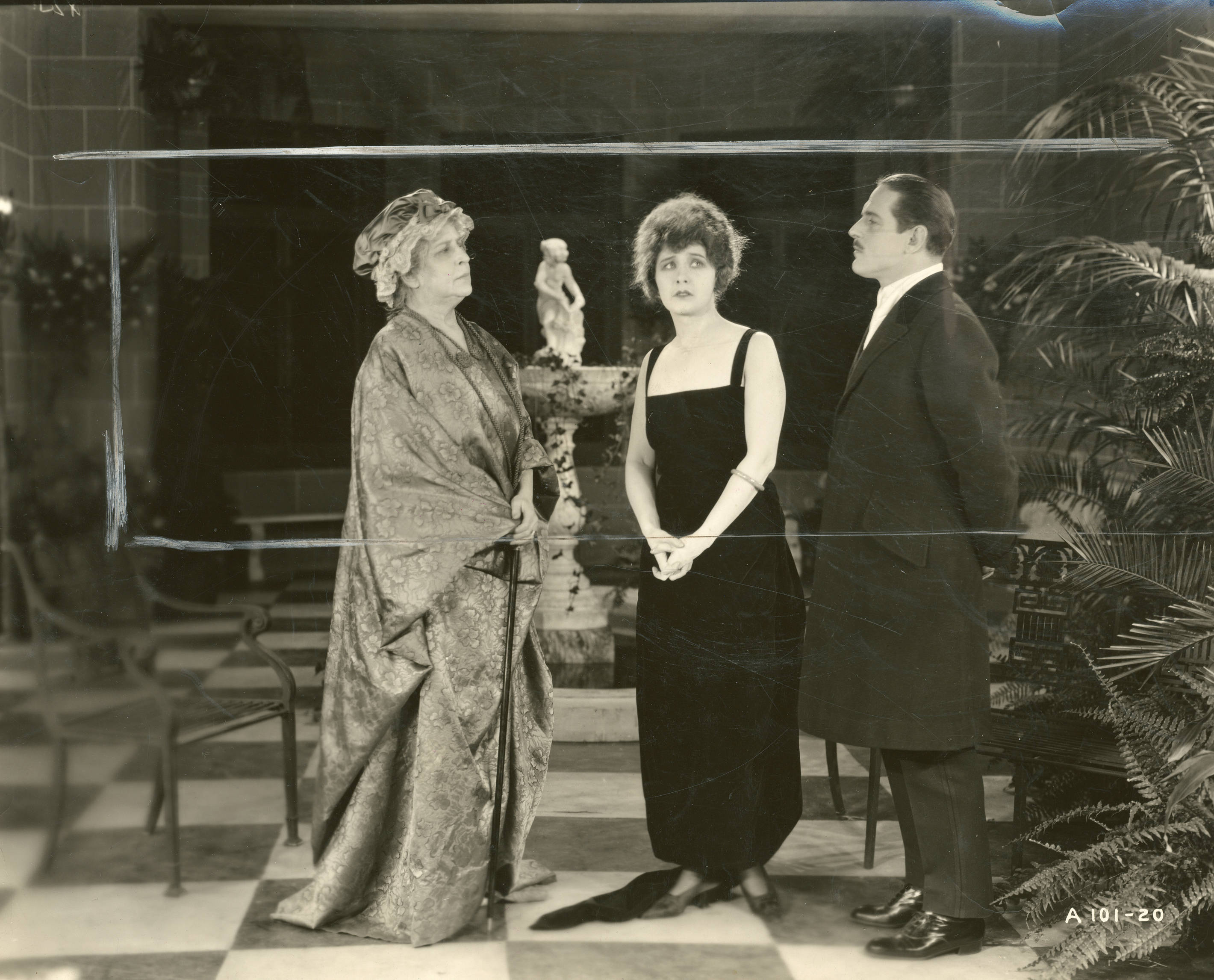
- Waterman, Elsie Ferguson, and David Powell in Lady Rose's Daughter (1920)
- Born: Ida Shaw; March 10, 1852; Philadelphia, Pennsylvania, U.S.
- Died: May 22, 1941 (aged 89); Cincinnati, Ohio, U.S.
- Occupation: Actress
- Years active: 1880-1926
- Spouses: Joseph Francoeur; Fred Waterman

Ida Waterman (born Ida Shaw; March 10, 1852 – May 22, 1941) was a stage and screen actress.

Waterman was born in Philadelphia, Pennsylvania. She appeared in some thirty or more Broadway productions between the late 1880s and early 1920s. She played Elise Claremont in the 1889 farce-comedy Our Flat and the following year Mrs. Kirke in Men and Women opposite Maude Adams. In 1899 she was Mrs. Crawley in Becky Sharp (later made into 1934 film Becky Sharp) and in 1922 closed out her Broadway career playing Mrs. French in Lawful Larceny.

Waterman was popular in numerous silent films in the teens and twenties as a supporting elderly actress much like Kate Lester. After decades of being a Victorian and Edwardian stage actress, Waterman moved into silent films in the 1910s. Waterman appeared in about 30 films until she retired in 1926. She died in 1941 in Cincinnati, Ohio.

== Selected filmography ==
- The Eagle's Mate (1914)
- Behind the Scenes (1914)
- Aristocracy (1914)
- Are You a Mason? (1915)
- The Ringtailed Rhinoceros (1915)
- Esmerelda (1915)
- Stella Maris (1918)
- Amarilly of Clothes-Line Alley (1918)
- Mr. Fix-It (1918)
- Sadie Love (1919)
- A Misfit Earl (1919)
- Counterfeit (1919)
- Lure of Ambition (1919)
- On with the Dance (1920)
- Lady Rose's Daughter (1920)
- Her Lord and Master (1921)
- The Inner Chamber (1921)
- The Lotus Eater (1921)
- Love's Redemption (1921)
- Her Lord and Master (1921)
- Notoriety (1922)
- A Society Scandal (1924)
- The Enchanted Cottage (1924)
- The Swan (1925)
- That Royle Girl (1925)
- A Social Celebrity (1926)
- Say It Again (1926)
