= Lady Rose's Daughter (novel) =

Book by Mary Augusta Ward

- Author: Mary Augusta Ward
- Language: English
- Publisher: Smith, Elder & Co.
- Publication date: 1903
- Publication place: England

Lady Rose's Daughter is a novel by Mary Augusta Ward that was the best-selling novel in the United States in 1903. The book was adapted in 1920 by director Hugh Ford, into a film starring Elsie Ferguson as Julie Le Breton and David Powell as Captain Warkworth.

Mary Augusta Ward was sometimes credited as "Mrs. Humphry Ward" on her books.
