= Lady Rose's Daughter =

1920 film by Hugh Ford

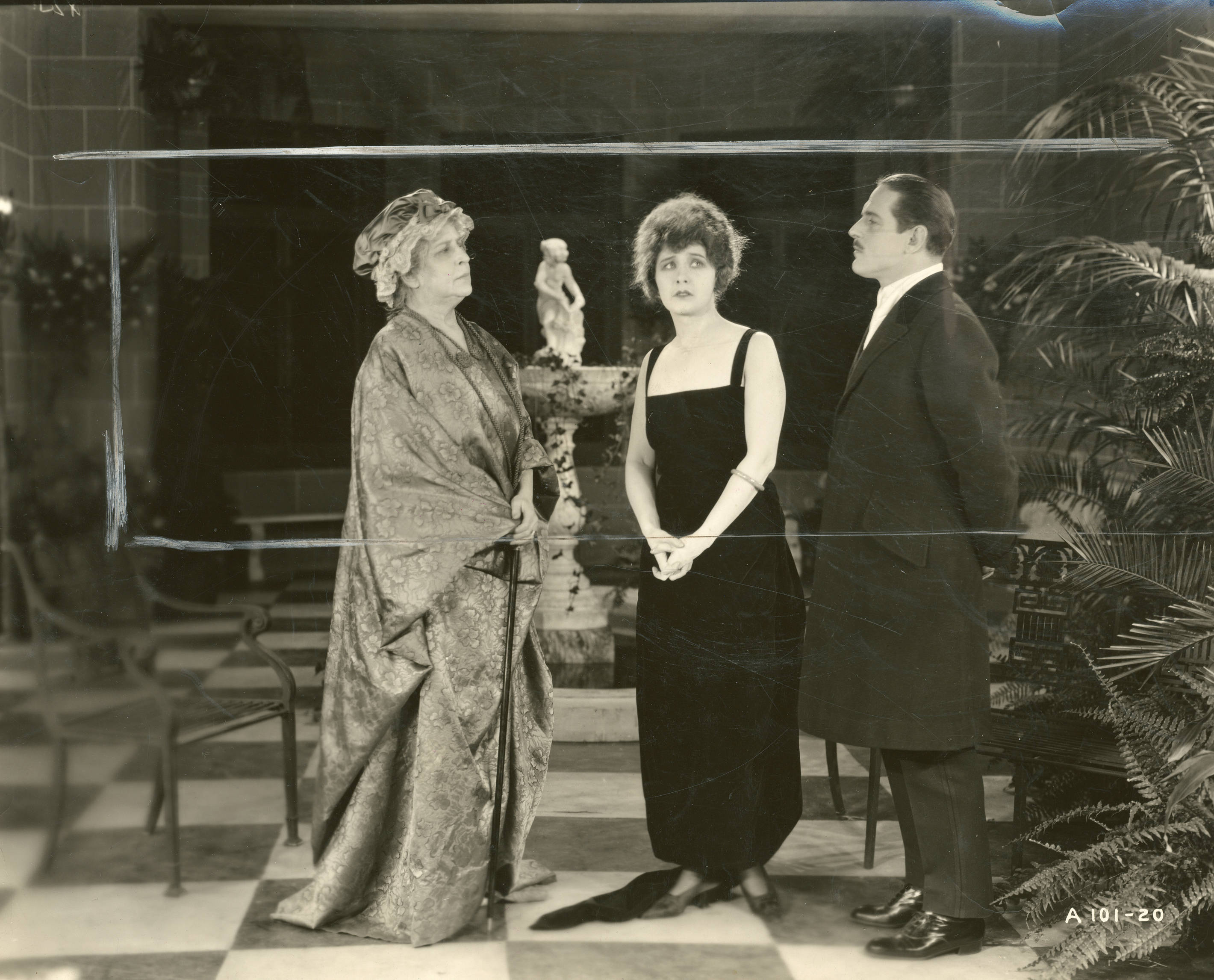
- Still with Ida Waterman, Elsie Ferguson, and David Powell
- Directed by: Hugh Ford
- Written by: Burns Mantle (scenario)
- Based on: Lady Rose's Daughter by Mrs. Humphry Ward
- Produced by: Adolph Zukor; Jesse L. Lasky
- Starring: Elsie Ferguson; David Powell
- Cinematography: Arthur C. Miller
- Distributed by: Paramount Pictures
- Release dates: August 1920 (NYC); September 12, 1920 (nationwide)
- Running time: 5 reels (4,585 feet)
- Country: United States
- Language: Silent (English intertitles)

Lady Rose's Daughter is a 1920 American silent drama film starring Elsie Ferguson and David Powell with directing being from Hugh Ford. It was produced by Famous Players–Lasky and released through Paramount Pictures. The film was based on a stage play performed in 1903 on Broadway. Both the film and the play were based on the famous 1903 novel by Mrs. Humphry Ward. The actress Ida Waterman had appeared in the original 1903 Broadway play.

As with most of Elsie Ferguson's silent films, it is now considered to be a lost film.

== Plot ==
As described in a film magazine, granddaughter and daughter of two matrimonial insurgents, Julie Le Breton has a bar sinister heritage to perpetually battle. In the position of secretary to her haughty aunt of wealth and social position, Lady Henry she obtains a popularity distasteful to the latter, particularly as it includes the affections of Lord Delafield. He persists in defiance of her wishes and in his love for Julie, who instead has given her heart to Captain Warkworth, unaware of his perfidy and an affair with a mutual friend, Aileen Moffet. Placed in a compromising situation in Warkworth's apartments after fleeing from the slurs and unfair treatment of her aunt Lady Henry, Julie gains knowledge of his dishonorable ways and decides to end her life by poison. When she is taken to the hospital to recover her health, the police find Lord Delafield's card in her possession. He comes to offer his faithful protection that ultimately wins her love after the death of Captain Warkworth.

== Cast ==
- Elsie Ferguson as Lady Maude / Lady Rose Delaney / Julie Le Breton
- Frank Losee as Lady Maude's Husband
- David Powell as Captain Warkworth
- Holmes Herbert as Jacob Delafield (credited as Holmes E. Herbert)
- Ida Waterman as Lady Henry Delafield
- Warren Cook as War Minister

== See also ==
- List of lost films
