= The Marriage of William Ashe (1921 film) =

1921 film

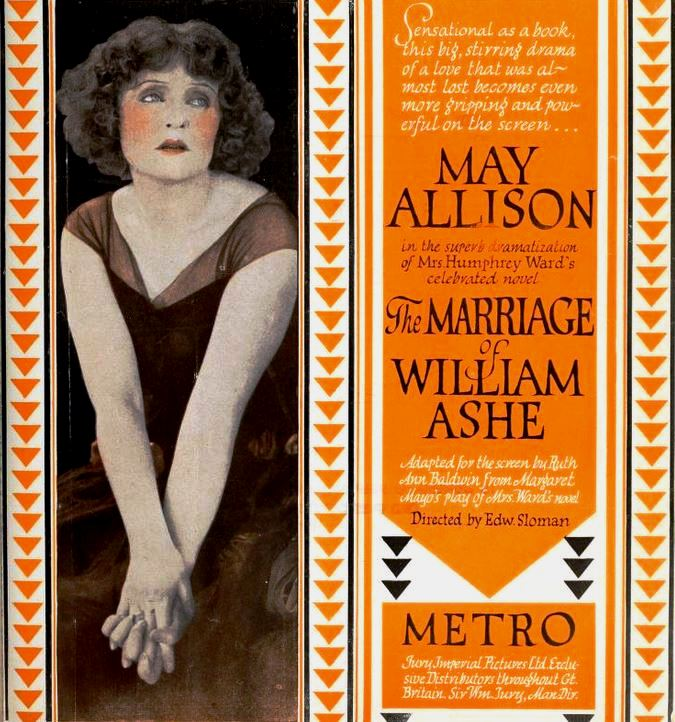
- Directed by: Edward Sloman
- Written by: Ruth Ann Baldwin
- Based on: a play by Margaret Mayo
- Produced by: Metro Pictures
- Starring: May Allison; Wyndham Standing
- Cinematography: Jackson Rose
- Distributed by: Metro Pictures
- Release date: January 17, 1921
- Running time: 6 reels
- Country: United States
- Languages: Silent; English intertitles

The Marriage of William Ashe is a 1921 American silent film directed by Edward Sloman and starring May Allison. It was produced and distributed by Metro Pictures. It is based on the 1905 British novel The Marriage of William Ashe by Mary Augusta Ward and its subsequent play adaptation by Margaret Mayo.

The story was filmed before in 1916 in Britain by Cecil Hepworth.

== Cast ==
- May Allison as Lady Kitty Bristol
- Wyndham Standing as William Ashe
- Zeffie Tilbury as Lady Tranmore
- Frank Elliott as Geoffrey Cliffe
- Robert Bolder as Lord Parham
- Lydia Yeamans Titus as Lady Parham
- Clarissa Selwynne as Lady Mary Lyster

== Preservation ==
With no prints of The Marriage of William Ashe located in any film archives, it is considered a lost film. In February 2021, the film was cited by the National Film Preservation Board on their Lost U.S. Silent Feature Films list.
