= Eleanor (novel) =

1900 novel by Mary Augusta Ward

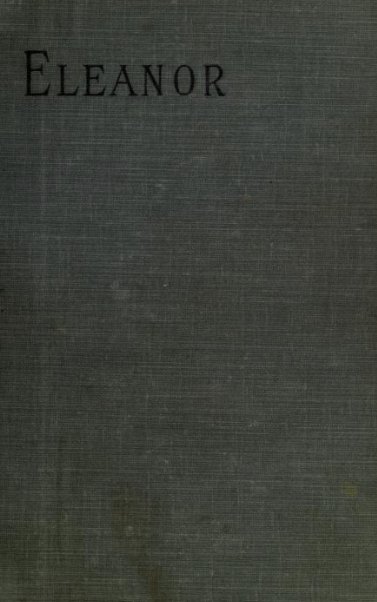
- Author: Mary Augusta Ward
- Language: English
- Publisher: Smith, Elder & Co.
- Publication date: 1900
- Publication place: England

Eleanor is a novel by British author Mary Augusta Ward, first published in 1900.
