= Sandwith =

Sandwith is a surname. Notable people with the surname include:

- Arnold Sandwith Ward (1876–1950), British journalist and Conservative politician
- Bill Sandwith (1922–99), Australian politician
- Charles Sandwith Campbell (1858–1923), Canadian benefactor, Montreal's Campbell Concerts and Campbell Parks
- Eamon Sandwith, vocalist and bassist of The Chats
- Elizabeth Sandwith Drinker, American Quaker diarist
- Humphry Sandwith, English army physician, writer and activist
- Humphry Sandwith (1792–1874), English physician and prominent Methodist
- Kevin Sandwith (born 1978), English football player
- Noel Yvri Sandwith (1901–1965), British botanist whose standard author abbreviation is Sandwith
- Noelle Sandwith (1927–2006), English artist
- Terran Sandwith (born 1972), Canadian ice hockey player
- Thomas Backhouse Sandwith, British diplomat

== See also ==
- Arnold Sandwith Ward, English journalist and politician
- Henry Sandwith Drinker, American lawyer and amateur musicologist
- John Sandwith Boys Smith, British priest and academic
