= Stocks House =

Mansion in Aldbury, Hertfordshire, England

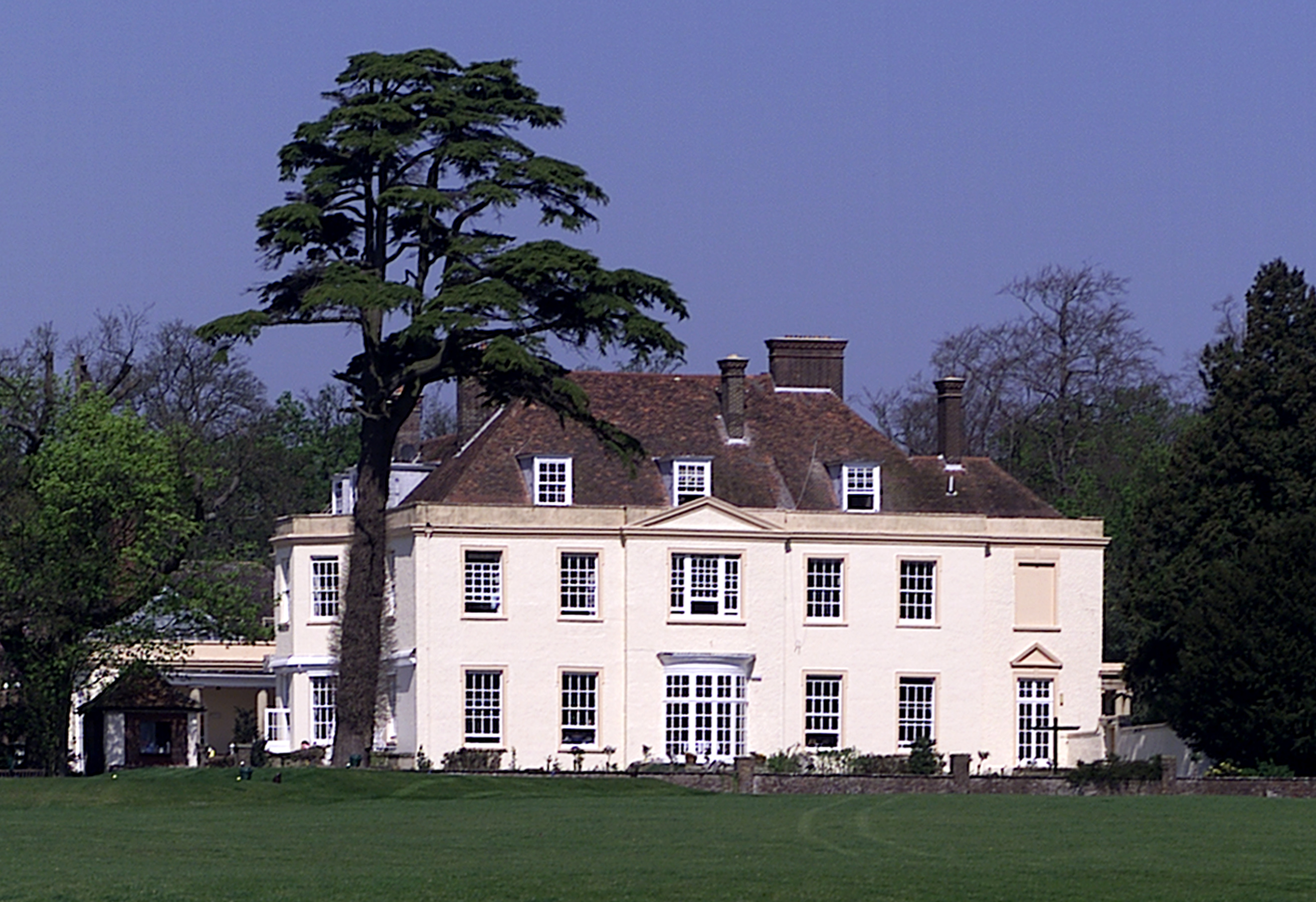
- Stocks House, pictured in around 1995

- Location within Hertfordshire
- Former names: La Stok

General information
- Type: English country house
- Architectural style: Neoclassical
- Location: Aldbury, Hertfordshire, United Kingdom
- Coordinates: 51°48′38″N 0°36′20″W
- Completed: 1773

Listed Building – Grade II
- Official name: Stocks House
- Designated: 21 May 1973
- Reference no.: 1078055

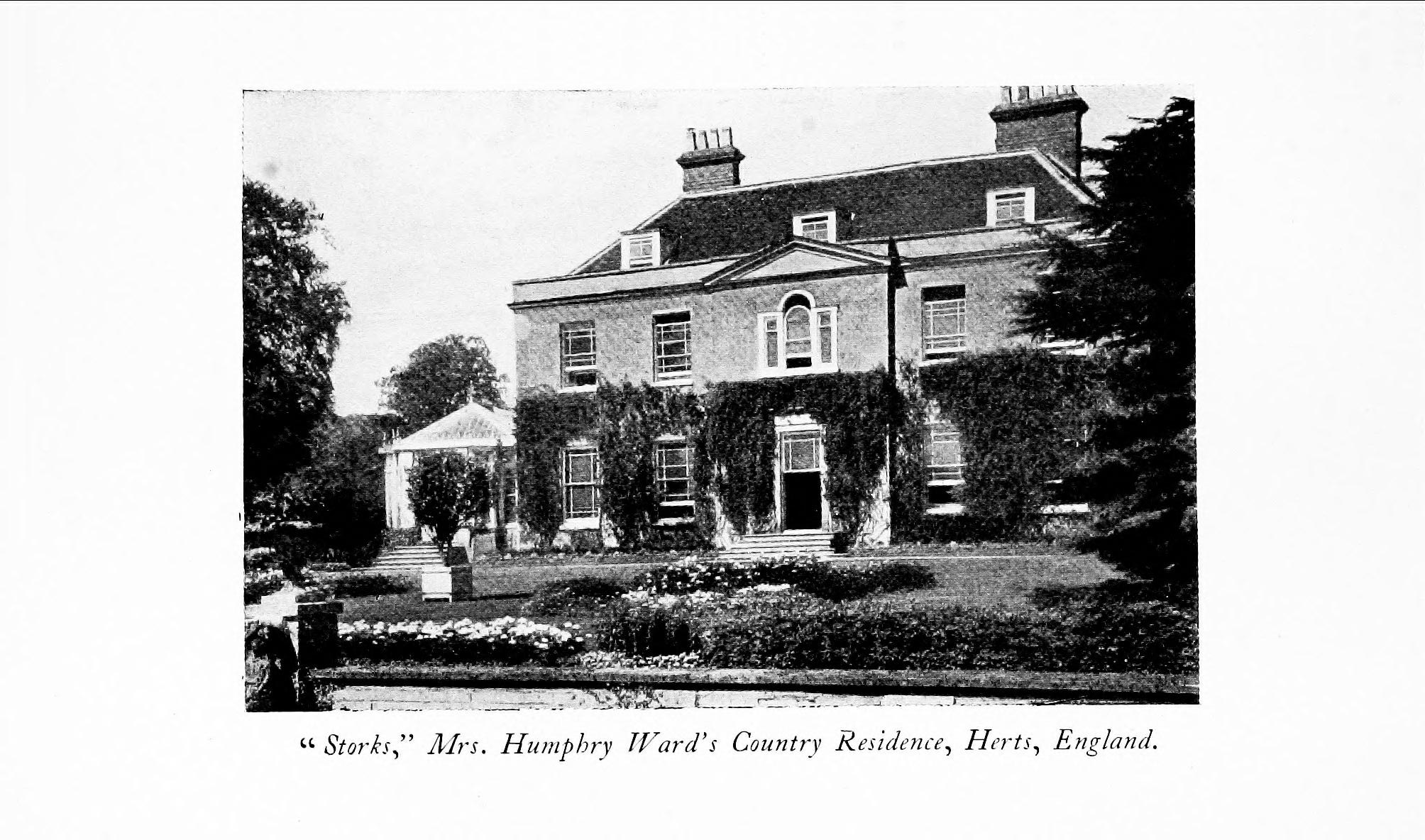
Stocks as it appeared at the time of Ward's residence (c.1903)

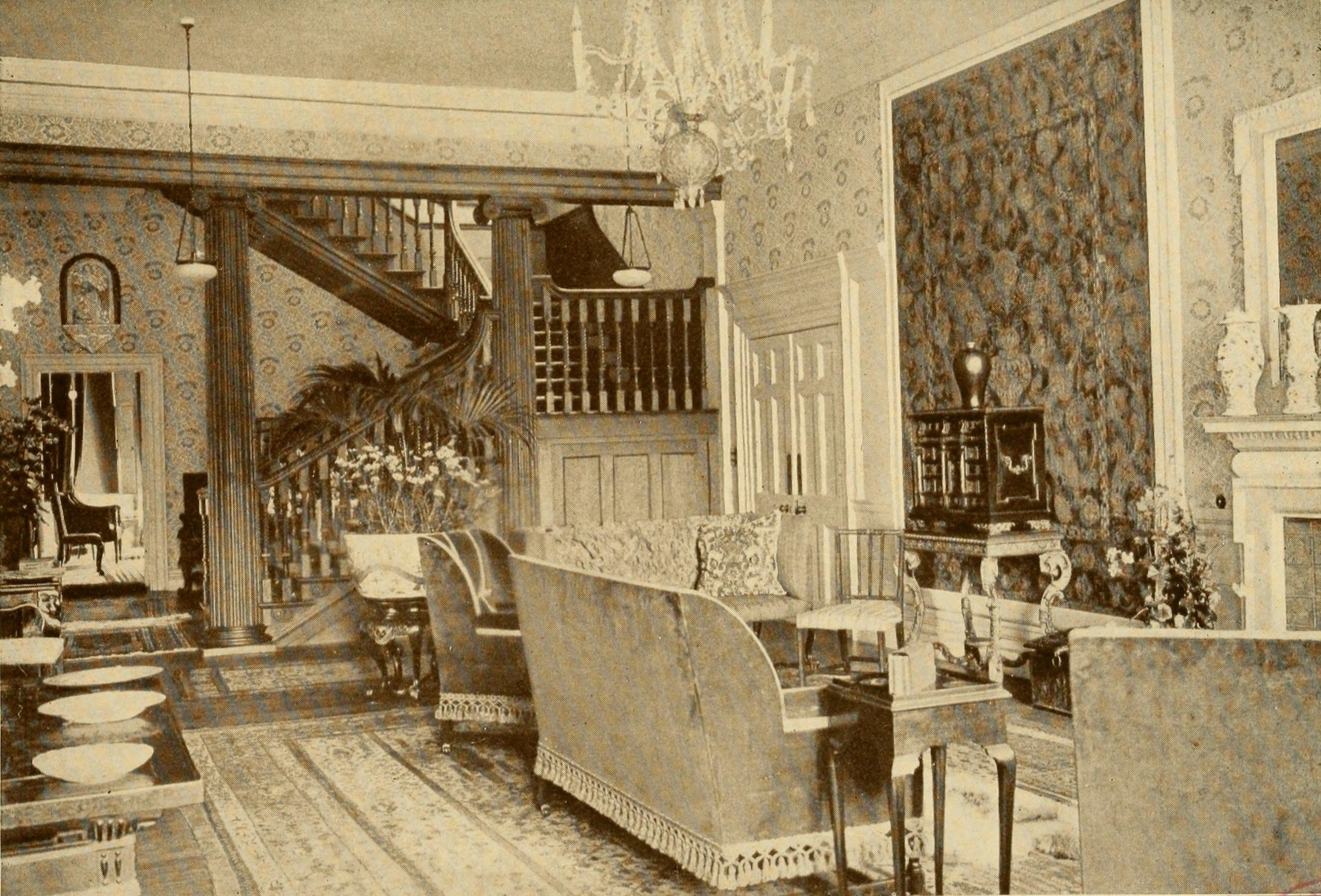
Interior of Stocks at the time of Ward's residence (c.1914)

Stocks Manor House is a large Georgian mansion, built in 1773. It is the largest property in the village of Aldbury, Hertfordshire. Stocks House and its manorial farm is an 182-acre (0.74 km^{2}) estate surrounded by 10,000 acres (40 km^{2}) of National Trust Ashridge Forest and the Chiltern Hills.

It takes its name from the old famous stocks of the medieval village of Aldbury just down the road.

== Early history ==
Stocks House was built in 1773 on the site of an earlier manor house known as La Stok which had existed since medieval times. Records from the 17th century show that the land was in the possession of Robert Duncombe, an ancestor of the Lords Feversham. In 1773, Arnold Duncombe built himself a new house. The estate then passed successively to the Hayton, Whitbread and Gordon families.

The house has had a number of literary associations. James Adam Gordon, who inherited the Stocks estate in 1832, was a friend of the Scottish author Sir Walter Scott, and it is reputed that the writer visited Gordon at Stocks House. In 1891, the house was inherited by Edward Grey, 1st Viscount Grey of Fallodon, who served as British Foreign Minister and Ambassador to the United States, from his grandfather. Lord Falloden's career never allowed him to live there, and in 1892 he sold Stocks House to best-selling British novelist Mary Augusta Ward and her husband Thomas Humphry Ward who made Stocks their home until Mary's death in 1920. Mary was the better known writer of the two, and published two best-selling novels Lady Rose's Daughter (1903) and The Marriage of William Ashe (1905), under the pen name Mrs Humphry Ward.

While the Wards lived at Stocks, it became a bustling salon of leading intellectual luminaries. Upon Ward's death, Stocks was inherited by her son, a Member of Parliament, Arnold Ward. who sold Stocks to the Blezard family, who later sold it to the bachelor Arthur Brown of the Luton quaker family of timber millers.

In 1944, Stocks House became a residential school when a finishing school in England for upper-class girls, Brondesbury, moved to Stocks manor house from the manor estate in Surrey, where it had previously been located. The school was then dubbed Brondesbury-at-Stocks. Katharina Forbes-Dunlop, a British author, became the last headmistress of the school, some years later. In 1972 Forbes-Dunlop retired: she died at the age of 100.

== Playboy ==
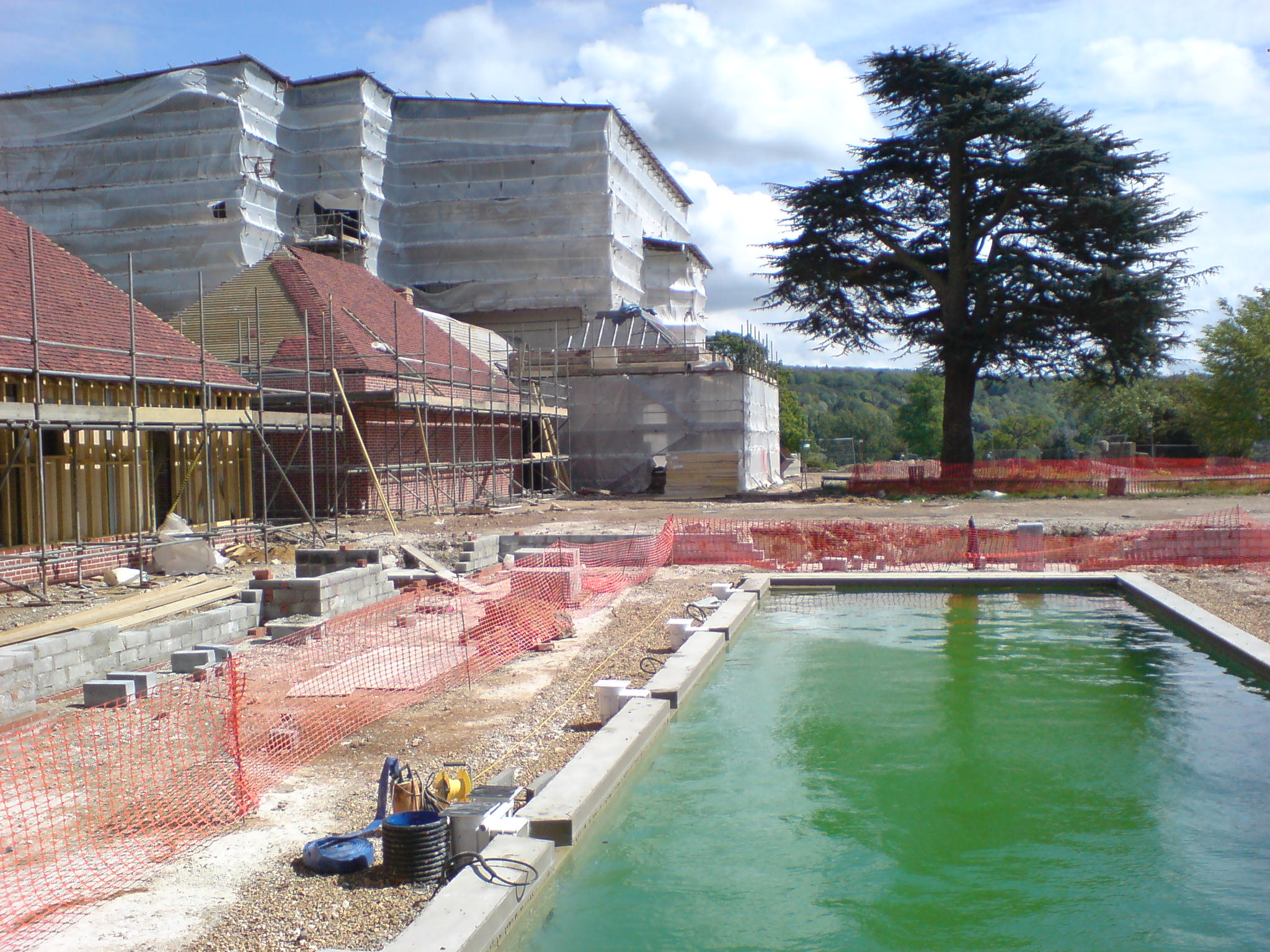
The swimming pool, pictured during renovations in 2007

In 1972, Stocks House achieved some notoriety when it was purchased by American Playboy executive Victor Lownes and English Playboy Playmate Marilyn Cole for £115,000. They renovated the house and fitted it out with a private disco, games room and swimming pool and installed a massive jacuzzi - reputedly the largest in the country. The mansion was used as a training camp for Playboy bunnies and Lownes was well known for leading a "lothario" lifestyle and hosting extravagant parties at Stocks. His most notorious party lasted a full 25 hours and featured a funfair in the grounds, and guests drank champagne and cavorted with models and beauty queens.

The parties were attended by a number of celebrities of the day including Peter Cook, John Cleese, Christopher Reeve, Jack Nicholson, Keith Moon and Tony Curtis, as well as Hugh Hefner, Kenny Lynch, Dai Llewellyn, Mick Jagger, Warren Beatty, Roman Polanski, Bryan Ferry and Ringo Starr. The ITN newsreader Reginald Bosanquet reportedly appeared at the events strutting around in a fez and calf-length boots. The parties attracted some comment from local residents; one local, complaining about a Hogmanay party held at Stocks, remarked: "At 3am on the first, the swimming pool was alive to the cries of naked ladies. And they were not singing Auld Lang Syne."

Despite his reputation for rowdy celebrations, Lownes was popular with villagers for his support for local charities. He donated Christmas hampers to elderly locals and supported community initiatives such as the Tring Donkey Derby, bringing to the event Playboy Bunny Girls and celebrity guests such as Miss World Silvana Suárez and the racehorse Red Rum.

Lownes also owned the house at 1 Connaught Square in London, which coincidentally was once the townhouse of Mary Augusta Ward, the former owner of Stocks, who died there.

== Phil Edmonds and conversion to hotel and spa ==
Following Lownes' ownership, Stocks was acquired by English Cricket player Phil Edmonds in the 1980s and then by Bridgend Group which converted it into a hotel and spa in the 1990s.

== Reversion to private house ==
In 2004, Stocks was sold to Peter Harris, a retired horse trainer, entrepreneur and multimillionaire, for an undisclosed sum. A planning application to Dacorum to restore the historic Stocks Hotel back to a private home was made. The extensive renovation work was undertaken by Holloway White Allom and completed in early 2008. The architect for the project was Hugh Petter, Director at ADAM Architecture. It is now a family home once again occupied by Harris's daughter Alison (former wife of deceased jockey Walter Swinburn) and her children.

== In popular culture ==
The cover art of the 1997 Oasis album, Be Here Now

Stocks House and the village of Aldbury have been a popular choice for location shooting for music, film and television productions. In 1967 the house was used for an episode of the popular television serial The Avengers entitled "Murdersville".

Some shots in the music video for the 1982 song "Our House" by Madness were filmed at Stocks House.

The music video for the 1984 song "Up Around the Bend" by the Finnish rock band Hanoi Rocks was filmed at Stocks House.

In 1997 the house and swimming pool also featured on the cover of the Oasis album, Be Here Now. For the photo shoot, a white 1972 Rolls-Royce Silver Shadow was lowered into the swimming pool.
