= Aldbury =

Village in Hertfordshire, England

Coordinates: 51.80°N 0.60°W

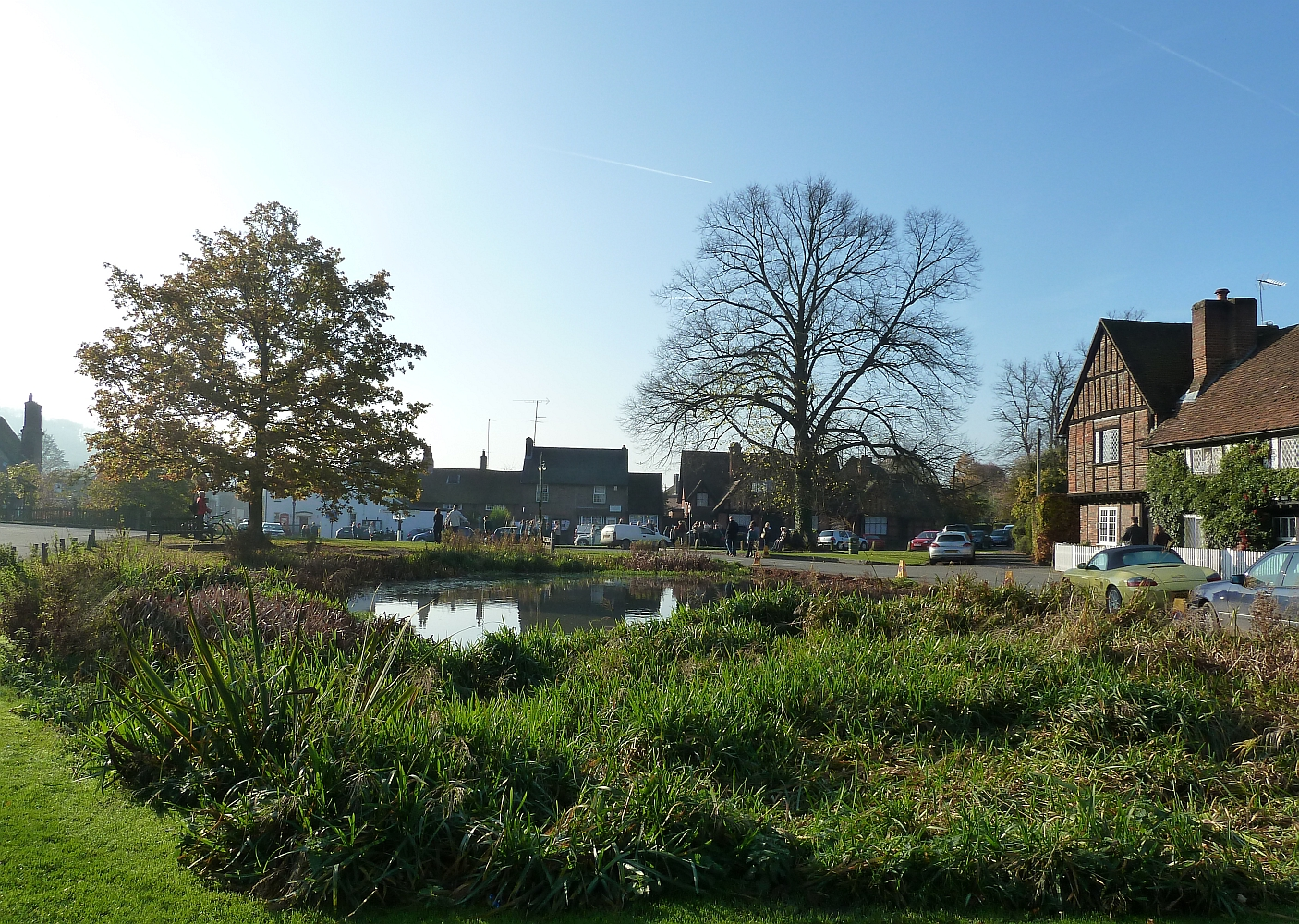
- The duck pond at the centre of the village

- Location within Hertfordshire
- Population: 964 (2011 census)
- OS grid reference: SP9612
- Civil parish: Aldbury
- District: Dacorum
- Shire county: Hertfordshire
- Region: East
- Country: England
- Sovereign state: United Kingdom
- Post town: TRING
- Postcode district: HP23
- Dialling code: 01442
- Police: Hertfordshire
- Fire: Hertfordshire
- Ambulance: East of England
- UK Parliament: South West Hertfordshire

Aldbury (/ˈɔːldbəri/) is a village and civil parish in Hertfordshire, England. It lies near to the borders of Buckinghamshire and Bedfordshire, in the Bulbourne valley of the Chiltern Hills, an Area of Outstanding Natural Beauty. The nearest towns are Tring and Berkhamsted. Uphill from the narrow valley are the Bridgewater monument and the Ashridge Estate, which is owned and managed by the National Trust.

Aldbury is designated as a conservation area, with most of the land surrounding the village largely unaltered since the late medieval period. The village is a popular filming location, retaining several archetypical historical features, including a green and pond, well-preserved stocks and a whipping-post, and the church of Saint John the Baptist.

The village has a lively community life, including a number of local societies and clubs. Residents are kept updated on village events through the Aldbury Outlook, a magazine published by local residents ten times a year. It has a village shop and post office, two pubs, three cafés, a Church of England primary school, a sports ground, tennis court and the nearby Stocks Golf Club.

Aldbury's picturesque setting and proximity to Tring railway station makes it one of the most desirable places to live in Hertfordshire. It has been referred to as a "chocolate-box" village due to its traditional appearance.

== History ==
The manor was recorded as Aldeberie in the Domesday Book of 1086. The public house, The Valiant Trooper, served as an ale house for centuries; the first traceable evidence dated to 1752.

The wooded slope towards the Bridgewater Monument is one of the steepest ascents in Hertfordshire, crowned by a ridge at one of the five highest elevations in the county. Monuments in the church witness the importance of certain manorial families including the family of Sir Ralph Verney (1546), who have the northern chapel in the church, and the similarly landed family of Thomas Hyde (1570) and his son George (1580). Aldbury was the home of Sir Guy de Gravade, known as the "Wizard of Aldbury", who was reputed to be able to turn base metals into gold.

To the north-west, Aldbury Nowers forms part of the Chiltern Hills. It is traversed by The Ridgeway ancient tracks and by two sections of Grim's Ditch, a linear earthwork dating from the Iron Age.

=== Etymology ===
The name 'Aldbury' is derived from the Old English ald (old) burh (fortification).

=== Aldbury Manor ===
In the time of Edward the Confessor, Aldbury Manor was held by Alwin, a thegn of the king; by 1086, it was in the hands of Robert, Count of Mortain. Throughout most of the Norman period the manor was held "of the honour" (with part rent due to) of the manor of Berkhamsted. Various lower nobles followed until it was held under a Dynham family trust in the 1530s by a wife of William Fitzwilliam (Sheriff of London). Shares created became acquired by John Hyde of Hyde, Dorset an officer of the Court of Exchequer, who had a lease of the manor and died in 1545.

In 1665, Sir Thomas Hyde, whose family had held the main manor for more than 100 years, died leaving the estate to his only daughter, Bridget. She married Peregrine Osborne, 2nd Duke of Leeds, whose family held the estate until Thomas Osborne, 4th Duke of Leeds sold it to Scroop Egerton, 1st Duke of Bridgewater. After further subdivision, the remaining manor descended to Francis Henry, ninth and last earl of Bridgewater, whose widow held it for life. At her death, it passed to John Hume Cust, Viscount Alford, eldest son of the first Earl Brownlow, and so finally to the 3rd Earl in 1867. He died in 1921 without leaving an heir (at which point the earldom and viscountcy became extinct). The lordship of the manor appears then to have passed to his second cousin, Adelbert, the 5th Baron and 8th Baronet Brownlow (d.1927); as in 1935, the then Lord of the Manor, Lord Brownlow (presumably Adelbert's son, the 6th Baron (9th Bart) Brownlow, d.1978), is reported to have conveyed "by deed of gift" the village green to the Aldbury Parish Council.

A few of the court rolls of the manor are held at the Public Record Office, now part of the National Archives).

=== Stocks House ===
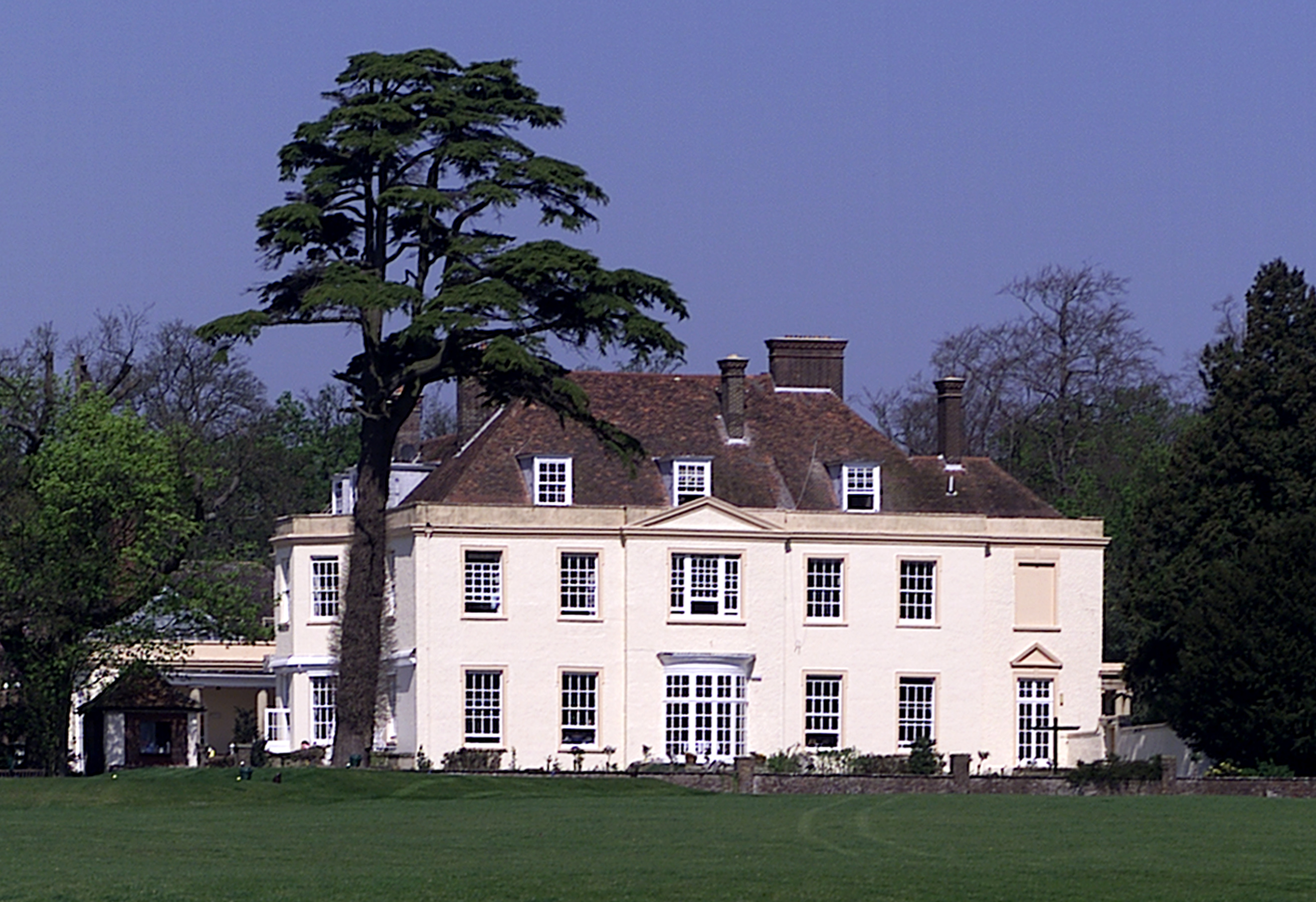
Stocks House

Landowner William de Mandeville held land at "la Stock' in Aldbury around 1176–1177. (Note: Also referred to as Stocks Manor; anciently la Stok) Records exist of a Henry de Bohun, who was a knight in the service of King Henry III's son, Prince Edward, and uncle of Humphrey de Bohun, 3rd Earl of Hereford and of Essex. In 1277–1278, the men of Stocks were ordered to come de Bohun's view of frankpledge at Amersham (Agmondesham) in Buckinghamshire. In 1278, de Bohun was granted the manors of Amersham and Nuthampstead by his nephew Humphrey. Henry may be the same Sir Henry de Bohun who was killed at the Battle of Bannockburn by the Scottish king Robert the Bruce in 1214. The land at Stocks belonged to a John de la Stock, who died in 1270. Records of feudal duties show that the land was held by a Master Henry Sampson in 1273. The last mention of Stocks until the 17th century appears when Philip de Aylesbury granted a piece of land called Stockyngge to William de Dunhamstede in 1318.

After a gap, there are references from the 17th century of the land being in the possession of Robert Duncombe, an ancestor of the Lords Feversham. In 1773, Arnold Duncombe built a new home, Stocks House. The estate then passed successively to the Hayton, Whitbread and Gordon families.

An heir to the Stocks estate, James Adam Gordon (d.1854), was a friend of the Scottish author Sir Walter Scott and it is reputed that the writer visited Gordon at Stocks House. Gordon's widow, Emma Katherine, married the politician Richard Bright, who died at Stocks in 1878. Emma Katherine died in 1891 and left the estate to Foreign Secretary Sir Edward Grey, as a descendant of Samuel Whitbread. He sold the house shortly afterwards, as all that remained, to the author Mary Augusta Ward, whose husband was also a writer, Thomas Humphry Ward. While the Wards lived at Stocks, it became a bustling literary salon, welcoming leading intellectuals and writers of the day, including their nephews Aldous Huxley and Julian Huxley, their son-in-law George Macaulay Trevelyan and Eric Blair (George Orwell). Mary Ward died in 1920 and Stocks was inherited by her son, politician Arnold Ward.

In 1944, Stocks was turned into a girls' school. Stocks House achieved some notoriety when it was purchased by Victor Lownes in 1972, an owner of Playboy magazine, who hosted lavish, rowdy parties there, staffed by scantily-clad bunny girls. The parties were attended by a number of celebrities of the day including Peter Cook, John Cleese, Christopher Reeve, Jack Nicholson, Keith Moon and Tony Curtis. After Lownes' death, the house was sold and became a hotel and golf course. Today, it is the home of racehorse trainer Walter Swinburn.

=== Launcelene's Manor ===
This consisted of 70 acres (28 ha) of general land, 3 acres (1.2 ha) of meadow and five shillings rent; it was held in 1361 of the heir of Roger Launcelene in free socage for the service of one pair of white gauntlets. John, son of William Aignel, died seised of this manor in 1361 and from this time it appears to have descended with the manor of Pendley in Tring.

=== Cherrywicke Manor ===
Robert Dogget bought land in Aldbury from Edward Verney in 1557, described as a manor in 1615, Edward Dogget sold the actual manor to Francis Bellingham, though parcels near the churchlands were held by John Dogget in 1638.

=== Valetta accident ===
On 6 January 1954, a Royal Air Force Vickers Valetta twin-engine training aircraft crashed at Tom's Hill, just south of the village. Of the 17 airmen on board, 16 were killed.

== Notable buildings ==
=== Parish church ===
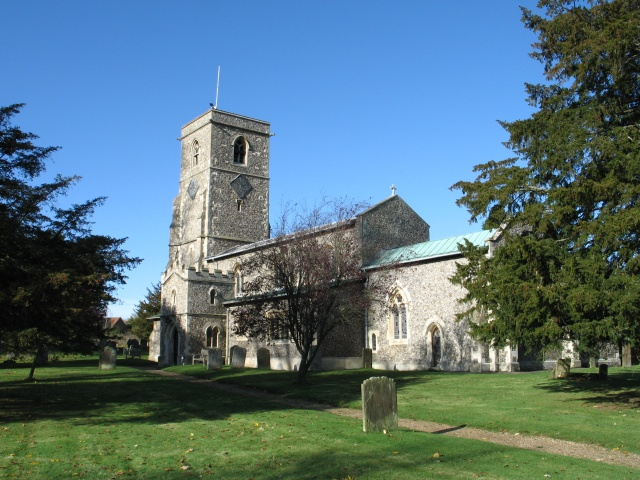
Parish Church of St. John The Baptist

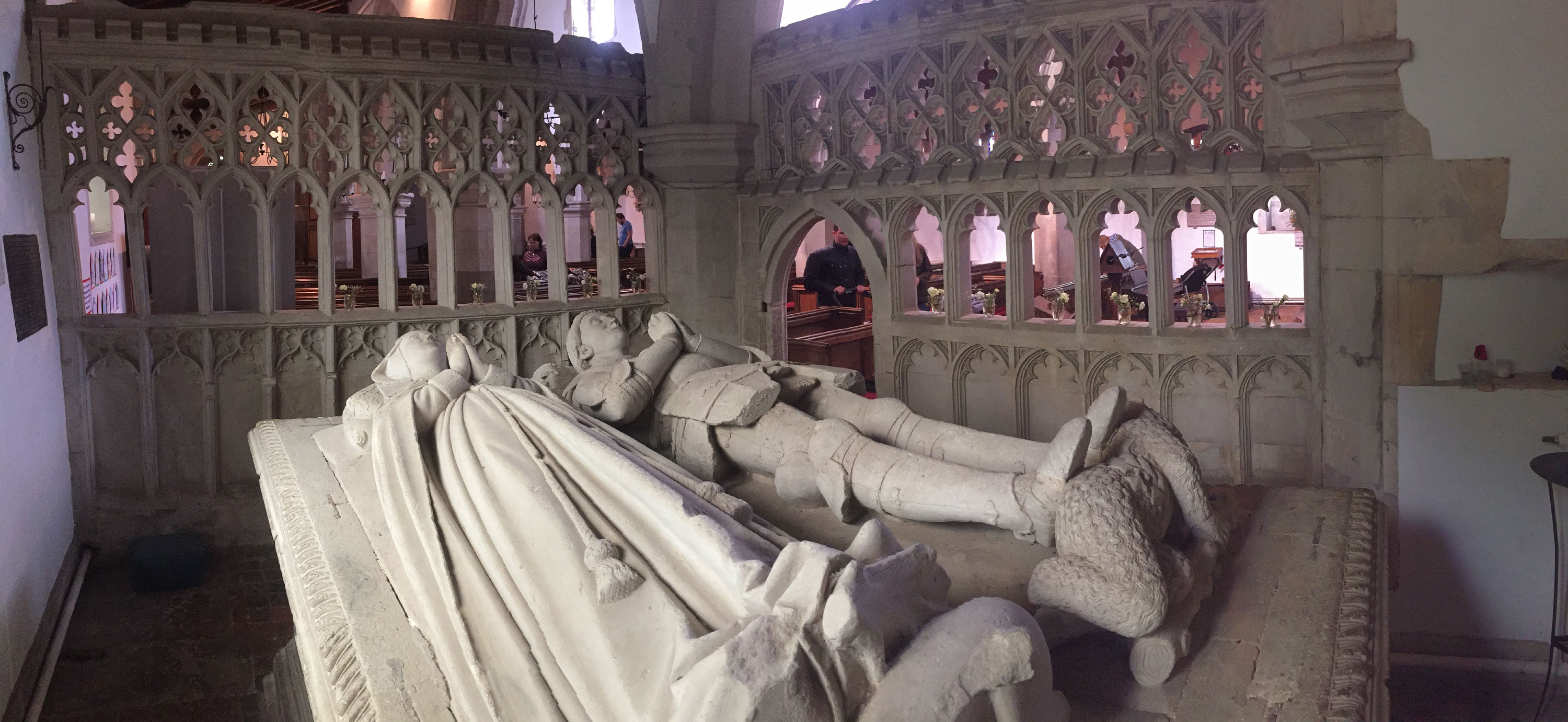
The Pendley Chapel, inside the parish church

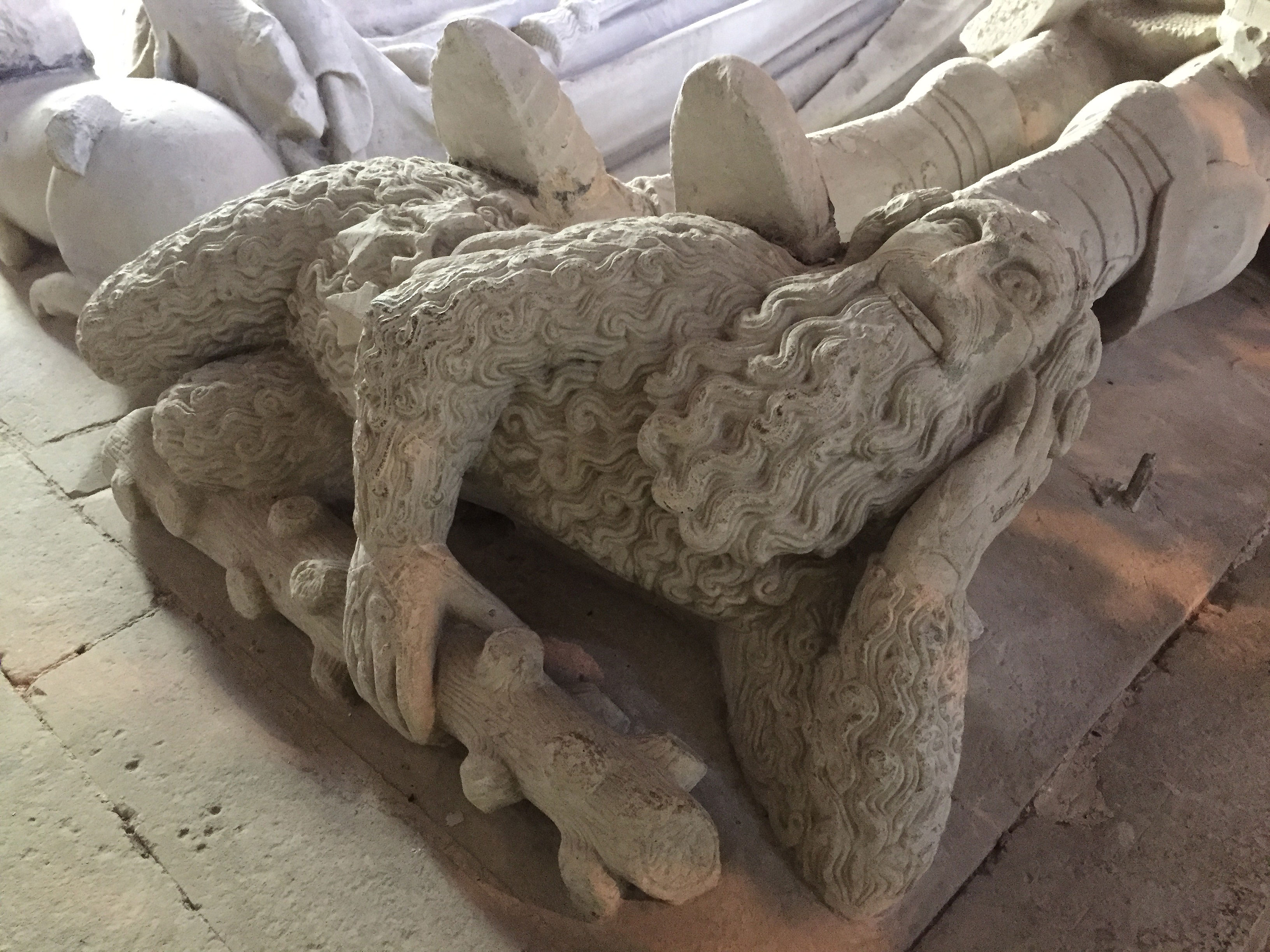
The Whittingham tomb Wild Man

The parish church of Saint John the Baptist is of Early English style. In 1203, the church was granted to the Canons of the Priory of St. Mary, Missenden by William de Brocland. Parts of the chancel and nave are 13th century in origin, thought to be part of an older Romanequse church which was enlarged in the 14th century. The church was restored in 1866–1867 by W. Browning, who removed two Romanesque arches from the north arcade of the nave and dressed the exterior in flint rubble masonry and totternhoe stone.

The church is noted for the Pendley Chapel, also known as the Verney Chapel, an ornate memorial chapel which is located at the east end of the nave. It was installed here in 1575 but its origins are much older; Edmund Verney had the tomb moved here from the dissolved monastery of Ashridge and enclosed it in an ornate stone parclose screen, also brought from Ashridge. The floor is covered in medieval encaustic tiles. The small chapel contains a carved stone recumbent tomb of Sir Robert Whittingham (d.1471), a nobleman who was slain at the battle of Tewkesbury (illustrated below). He is depicted in plate armour lying next to his wife. At his feet lies a wild man, a mythical creature covered in hair, and a hind lies at his wife's feet. On the wall is a later monument to Sir Richard Anderson (1635–1699) of Pendley Manor and to his wife Elizabeth (1631–1698), sister of George, Viscount Hewwett. The Anderson are represented as a pair of busts surrounded by marble pilasters surmounted by a segmental pediment.

The church also contains memorials of the Hides and Harcourts, families who left charities to the poor of the parish.

=== The Valiant Trooper ===
The 17th-century cottages that form the Trooper have served as alehouses for several centuries. The first traceable evidence dates back to 1752, when the pub – then known as The Royal Oak – was left in the will of one John Barnes. Its next owner was Isaac Dell Master, whose initials "ID" and the date "1769" can be seen carved in the brickwork alongside the main front window. The name changed to The Trooper Alehouse in 1803, rumoured to be because the Duke of Wellington met his troops here to discuss tactics. In the 1970s, Playboy executive Victor Lownes was a regular customer at the Valiant Trooper. In 2023, the pub reopened after restoration as The Trooper, with an adjoining café opening in 2024.

== Parish council ==
Aldbury Parish Council is the local administrative body, which includes the village and the hamlet at Tring station. In Saxon times, Aldbury lay in Dacorum, one of the Hundreds of Hertfordshire and, in 1973, the Dacorum Borough of Hertfordshire provided recycling, ultimate planning authority, and certain business and leisure services.

== Transport ==
Tring railway station lies 1 mile (1.6 km) west of the village, within the parish of Aldbury. London Northwestern Railway operates frequent passenger services southbound to London Euston and northbound to Milton Keynes Central.

Red Rose Travel operates the 387 bus route approximately every two hours to Tring, via the railway station.

== In popular culture ==
Aldbury is a popular location for films and television; scenes filmed in the village include:

=== Film ===
- 1947: Jassy (the last production by Gainsborough Pictures)
- 1967: The Dirty Dozen (the scene at the beginning of the training exercise)
- 1969: Crossplot (last scene)
- 1979: The Shillingbury Blowers (film) starring Robin Nedwell, Trevor Howard and Diane Keen
- 1999: Parting Shots A movie directed by Michael Winner, starring Chris Rea and Felicity Kendal. Various scenes were shot opposite The Greyhound pub, next to the village pond.
- 1980: Hopscotch, starring Walter Matthau and Glenda Jackson who meet beside the village pond towards the end of the film.
- 2004: Bridget Jones: The Edge of Reason, the Greyhound pub (including a scene involving fox hunting cut from the cinema release but on DVD)
- 2023: Lord of Misrule, starring Tuppence Middleton and Ralph Ineson.
- 2025: The Thursday Murder Club, starring Helen Mirren, Pierce Brosnan, Ben Kingsley and Celia Imrie

=== Television ===
- 1967: The Avengers, two episodes of the sixties TV series: episode "Dead Man's Treasure" town, renamed "Swingingdale", original air date 21 October 1967 (UK); the complete episode "Murdersville", renamed "Little Storping In-The-Swuff". original air date 11 November 1967 (UK)
- The church, churchyard/graveyard, path to the primary school and as the Greyhound pub featured in a 1975 Dave Allen sketch (the race to the graveyard between two funeral parties)
- Shillingbury Tales series, filmed in 1980
- "Absolute Conviction", a 1992 episode of the TV detective series Inspector Morse, featured the pub
- National Lottery initial advertisements (despite the fact that the shop was unable to sell tickets at the time)
- Marchlands
- Midsomer Murders episodes "Written in Blood" and "Murder of Innocence".
- 2025: Man vs Baby, starring Rowan Atkinson
