= Victor Lownes =

American film producer (1928–2017)

- Born: Victor Aubrey Lownes III; April 17, 1928; Buffalo, New York, U.S.
- Died: January 11, 2017 (aged 88); London, England
- Education: New Mexico Military Institute
- Alma mater: University of Chicago
- Organization: Playboy Enterprises (originally known as HMH Publishing)
- Known for: Executive for Playboy Enterprises and creator of the Playboy Clubs with Hugh Hefner
- Spouse(s): Judith Downs; Marilyn Cole
- Children: Victor Aubrey Lownes IV; Meredith Lownes

Victor Aubrey Lownes III (April 17, 1928 – January 11, 2017) was an executive for HMH Publishing Company Inc., later known as Playboy Enterprises, from 1955 through the early 1980s. Soon after he met Hugh Hefner in 1954, Hefner founded Playboy magazine, and Lownes eventually joined his publishing company, serving as vice president. Lownes was a close confidant of Hefner and gained a reputation for dating Playboy Playmates.

Lownes headed Playboy Europe and the UK Playboy Clubs from the mid-1960s until his dismissal in the early 1980s. Lownes oversaw Playboy Enterprises's move into casino gambling in the UK in the 1960s, which became Playboy's most successful business other than its publishing until the advent of cable television. He oversaw the most successful part of Hefner's attempt to diversify out of publishing and into motion pictures, hotels and casino gambling. During his time as head of Playboy Europe, he was Britain's highest paid executive, drawing a large salary and eventually becoming Playboy Enterprises's second biggest shareholder. Lownes is credited with creating Playboy Clubs in the United States.

== Biography ==
=== Early life ===
Victor Aubrey Lownes III was born on April 17, 1928, in Buffalo, New York, the elder son of Victor Aubrey Lownes Jr. and Winifred (Winnie Mark) Lownes, a wealthy couple with ties to the Yale time lock fortune in Buffalo.

At the age of 12, his father gave him a cigar to smoke as aversion therapy. At the same age, he also accidentally shot and killed his best friend, which resulted in his forced enrollment at the New Mexico Military Institute in Roswell. While there, he met Conrad Hilton Jr., who became a friend.

Lownes enrolled at the University of Chicago in 1944 under the experimental "Chicago Plan" undergraduate program developed by then-chancellor Robert Maynard Hutchins. He received the program's interdisciplinary A.B. in 1947. In 1946, at the age of 18, Lownes wed fellow University of Chicago student Judith Downs. They had two children, Victor "Val" Aubrey Lownes IV and Meredith Lownes.

After several jobs, he found employment at Yale. “I was promoted to manager within a few months,” he would later write, “due solely to hard work, conscientiousness and the fact that my grandfather owned the company.” While he was successful, with a loving wife, two children, a large home, and a good job, he was unsatisfied. Following his father's death, after seven years of marriage he had what in an older man would be called a mid-life crisis. He rebelled against the apparent respectability of the middle class American dream, trapped by marriage and decided to abandon his family.

=== Playboy ===
Following the dissolution of his marriage, Lownes returned to Chicago, where he lived for several months entertaining young women. At a party in 1954, Lownes met Hugh Hefner, a man whose almost identical interests had not long previously led him to create Playboy magazine. Lownes was asked to write a couple of articles, and in November 1955, he was offered a full-time job with the company as Promotions Director. He set about drumming up advertising for the pariah publication, most conservative companies wanting nothing to do with the magazine. He was quite successful in changing minds.

Advertising for a club called Gaslight in Chicago, Lownes saw an opportunity to diversify the Playboy brand and suggested to Hefner that Playboy should open a club of its own. Hefner immediately saw the commercial and promotional benefits. Plans for a Playboy Club were begun in 1959. Lownes' then girlfriend suggested to Hefner the idea of dressing the hostesses in the image of the tuxedoed Playboy Bunny character. Hefner took some persuading as he had always viewed the rabbit as a male character but once he saw a prototype of the outfit he changed his mind.

Under Lownes' management, the first Playboy Club opened in downtown Chicago on 116 E Walton Street. It was essentially a bar with entertainment featuring Playboy Bunnies serving drinks and performances by some big names in entertainment. The doors opened for the first time on the leap year night of February 29, 1960 and it was an immediate success. More clubs followed in other cities in the United States.

=== Move to the UK ===
In 1963, Lownes asked Hefner to send him to London to open the first British Playboy Club. He placed an advertisement in The Times' personal columns that read: "American millionaire seeks a flat in the most fashionable part of London. Rents up to £100 a week." He found a house at 3 Montpellier Square, opposite Harrods which he rented for 75 guineas a week. He spent months in London working out how and where to open a club.

Gambling had recently been legalized in the UK and Lownes realized there was an opportunity to add the attraction of a casino to the nightclub. A Playboy Club was opened in the heart of the capital, at 45 Park Lane overlooking Hyde Park, on July 1, 1966, and was an immediate success. It was nicknamed the "Hutch on the Park."

"UK One", as Lownes became known, easily fitted in with "Swinging London". Regular parties were thrown at his house; attendees included such London Playboy Club habitués as The Beatles, George Best, Warren Beatty, Michael Caine, Judy Garland, Sean Connery, Terry Southern, Roman Polanski and Sharon Tate. In 1967, Lownes moved to 1 Connaught Square, which had previously been the London residence of Mary Augusta Ward, a novelist of the late 19th and early 20th century. A massive Francis Bacon painting he acquired during this time was judged so hideous that it was exiled to hanging in the hall, while a grandfather clock inside the property was painted by Timothy Leary.

=== 1970s ===
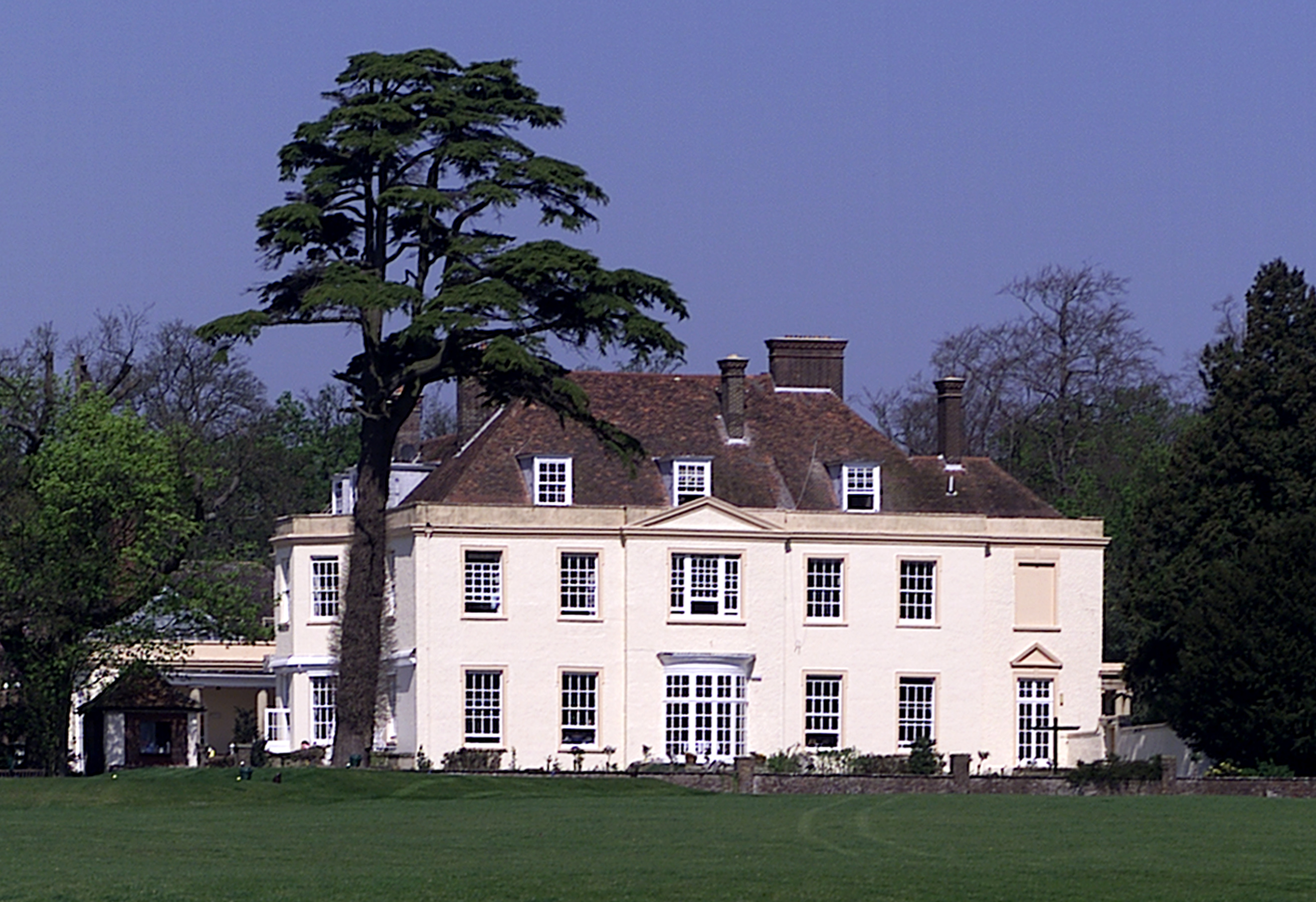
Lownes's Hertfordshire mansion Stocks House (pictured around 1995)

In the 1970s, Playboy magazine encountered competition from a new generation of rival periodicals (most notably Penthouse and Hustler), precipitating a gradual decline in overall profitability. However, gaming profits from the London casino kept rising, making future expansion into gaming very attractive. The Clermont Club in Berkeley Square, known for its celebrity clientele, was purchased in the spring of 1972, while the Manchester and Portsmouth Casino Clubs were opened in 1973.

A large rural property a few miles from London was added to the organization in 1972: Stocks House, a 42-room Georgian mansion located outside Aldbury, Hertfordshire, which, coincidentally, had also previously been the country home of Mary Augusta Ward. At the time of Lownes' purchase, it had been in use as a girls' boarding school since 1944. As well as being Victor Lownes residence, the mansion was used as a training camp for Playboy bunnies and was well known for hosting extravagant parties, including the 1978 25-hour party (to celebrate the 25th anniversary of the founding of Playboy magazine), when guests and Bunny Girls who were given green dots to wear, and were allowed upstairs to Stocks' many bedrooms. Despite rowdy celebrations at Stocks, Lownes became popular with villagers for his supporting local charities.

With the gaming licence approval for the Victoria Sporting Club in February 1981, Playboy Enterprises became the largest, and, table for table, one of the most profitable gaming operators in the UK. They had three London casinos, two provincial casinos, interests in two others, 72 off track betting parlours, and six bingo parlours.

By 1975, Hefner's penchant for becoming involved in various ventures, (including the film-oriented Playboy Productions, Playboy Records and the Playboy Press), before losing interest, had exacerbated the lack of profitability in many areas of Playboy Enterprises. Lownes was briefly recalled to Chicago by Hefner as a hatchet man to "trim the fat" off the corporation. He was given virtually unlimited powers: on the job, Lownes was so dedicated to cutting expenses that he was known within the company as "Attila" or "Jaws".

=== Film production ===
Under the auspices of the fledgling Playboy Productions unit, Lownes was the executive producer for And Now for Something Completely Different (1971), the first Monty Python film. He was a fan and proposed the idea of a film specifically designed to introduce the British comedy troupe to a U.S. audience. He was very egotistical. According to Terry Gilliam, Lownes insisted on getting an animated executive producer credit equal in size to those of the group members. Gilliam refused and so Lownes had the credit made elsewhere at his own cost. Gilliam then created a different style of credit for the Pythons so Lownes' credit is the only one that appears in this way. In their later film, Monty Python Live at the Hollywood Bowl (1982), Gilliam burlesqued the incident by giving one Python a credit name three times the size of anyone else's: "MICHAEL PALIN – as the man with the biggest credit".

Lownes persuaded Hefner to provide $1,500,000 to finance Polanski's film Macbeth (1971) through Playboy Productions when no other movie studio would touch it. Polanski proceeded to go $600,000 over budget and then mock Playboy's generosity. Lownes terminated his friendship with Polanski over his behavior. Angrily, he returned a cherished gift to Polanski, the life-sized gold penis Polanski had modeled for during happier days. Lownes wrote that "I'm sure you'll have no difficulty finding some friend you can shove it up".

=== Downfall ===
By 1981, Lownes was back in London, serving as senior vice-president at Playboy Enterprises, with a portfolio encompassing the profitable casinos. He was leading the effort to open up Atlantic City, New Jersey for gambling from his London base. Work was started on the future Atlantic City casino building. However, Lownes was accused of irregularities by the Gaming Board for Great Britain as the project progressed. Hefner panicked, firing Lownes before his scheduled meeting with the committee, in an obvious attempt to save the New Jersey deal. Without him, the company's British gaming licence was revoked and Playboy lost their most valuable assets. Additionally, Playboy's temporary gaming licence in Atlantic City was not renewed.

Playboy, which made $31 million in the year ending June 30, 1981, lost more than $51 million in the year ending June 30, 1982. With the loss of its gaming assets, Playboy barely survived. In 1990, Hefner and Lownes reconciled after a nine-year estrangement.

=== After Playboy ===
Lownes himself suffered little more than wounded pride. He had accumulated a fortune during his years as Britain's best paid executive and he still had his wife, Marilyn Cole, whose affections he and Hefner had both attempted to gain. Marilyn was the first full frontal Playboy Playmate of the Month, in January 1972, and the Playmate of the Year 1973. She continued to pose for Playboy until 1984, and became a journalist who has written for The Observer, Esquire and GQ. During this period, Lownes invested in several successful West End theatre productions, including Other People's Money and Stomp.

Lownes also reconciled with Polanski following his dismissal. During the Roman Polanski libel case against Vanity Fair in July 2005, Lownes was ill and could not attend the trial. His wife came in his place. Lownes was rarely seen in public in his latter years.

== Death ==
Lownes died in London, on January 11, 2017, at the age of 88, from a heart attack.

== Sources ==
- Miller, Russell (1985). Bunny: The Real Story of Playboy. London: Corgi. ISBN 0-03-063748-1.
- The Bunny Girl. Secret History. 14 September 1999. Channel 4.
- Lownes, Victor (1983). The Day The Bunny Died. New Jersey: Secaucus. ISBN 0-8184-0340-3.
