= Janet Trevelyan =

British writer (1879–1956)

Janet Trevelyan CH
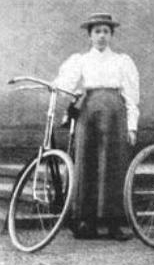
- At a family party in 1896
- Born: Janet Penrose Ward; 6 November 1879; Oxford, England
- Died: 7 September 1956 (aged 76); Newcastle upon Tyne, England
- Occupations: Writer, social activist
- Spouse: George Macaulay Trevelyan (m. 1904)
- Children: 3
- Parents: Humphry Ward; Mary Augusta Arnold
- Relatives: Arnold Ward (brother)

Janet Penrose Trevelyan, CH (née Ward; 6 November 1879 – 7 September 1956) was a British writer, social campaigner, and fundraiser.

== Biography ==
Trevelyan was born Janet Penrose Ward in Oxford, England, on 6 November 1879. She was the daughter of art critic Humphry Ward and writer Mary Augusta Ward, and through her mother was related to Matthew Arnold and Thomas Arnold. Her brother was the Conservative MP Arnold Ward.

Educated at home, and without attending university, Trevelyan translated Adolf Jülicher's Introduction to the New Testament, and Wilhelm Bousset's Life of Jesus in the early 1900s. She wrote a biography of her mother after her mother died in 1920

Following in her mother's footsteps, Trevelyan became involved in the movement to provide play centres for London children, which were eventually transferred to the London County Council in 1941. From 1931 to 1935 she organised the "Save the Foundling Site" appeal to purchase the site of the Foundling Hospital in Bloomsbury as a playground and welfare centre for children. Today the site is known as Coram's Fields. For her efforts, she was appointed a Member of the Order of the Companions of Honour in 1936.

Trevelyan also had a special interest in Italy: she was the author of several books on the country, and was instrumental in the establishment and survival of the British Institute of Florence, to which she served as Honorary Secretary from 1920 to 1946.

On 19 March 1904, she married historian George Macaulay Trevelyan and they had two sons and a daughter together. She died in the Royal Infirmary at Newcastle-upon-Tyne, as a result of arteriosclerosis on 7 September 1956.
