= Humphry Sandwith =

British army physician and author (1822–1881)

Humphry Sandwith IV
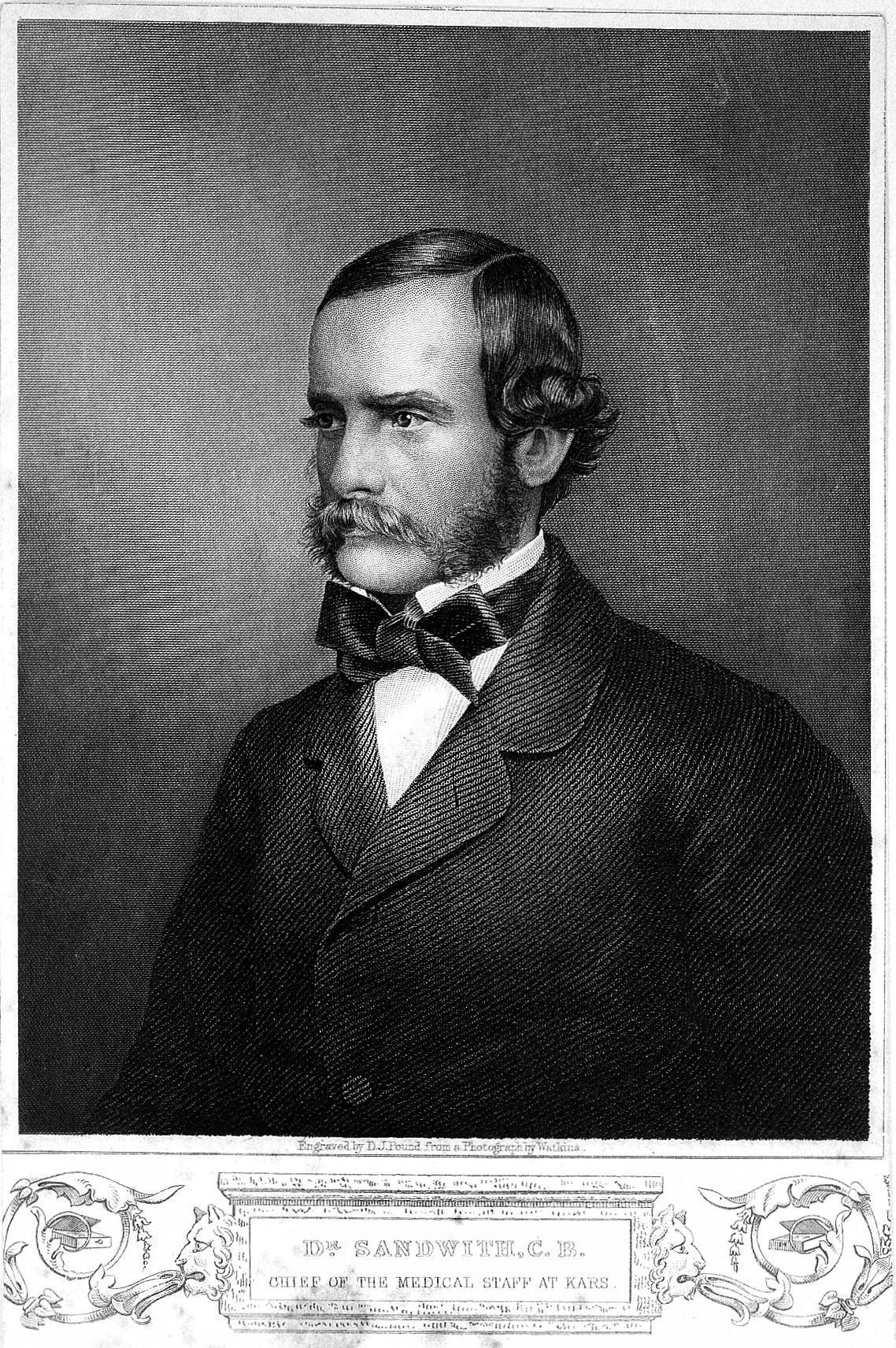
- Born: 1822; Bridlington, Yorkshire, United Kingdom
- Died: 16 May 1881 (aged 58–59); Paris, France
- Occupation: Physician
- Spouse: Lucy Hargreaves (m. 1860)
- Children: 5
- Father: Humphry Sandwith III

Humphry Sandwith IV (1822 – 16 May 1881) was an English army physician, known also as a writer and activist.

== Early life ==
Born at Bridlington, Yorkshire, he was eldest son of Humphry Sandwith III (1792–1874), a surgeon who became a physician in Kingston upon Hull; his mother was a daughter of Isaac Ward of Bridlington. After some schooling, where he learnt little, Sandwith was apprenticed at age 16 to his uncle Thomas Sandwith (1789–1867), another medical man, at Beverley.

Sandwith left Beverley in 1843, for the medical school at Hull, and spent a few months at Lille to learn French. He then entered University College, London, and in the autumn of 1846 he passed the examinations of London University and the Royal College of Surgeons, and was qualified to practise. He was appointed house surgeon to the Hull Infirmary in 1847, but poor health made him resign.

In March 1849 Sandwith travelled to Constantinople with letters of introduction to Sir Stratford Canning, the English ambassador. In August he accompanied Canning's protégé, Austen Henry Layard, in his second archæological expedition to Nineveh, and spent nearly two years in Mesopotamia. Fever obliged him to return to Constantinople in September 1851. In 1853 he was appointed correspondent of The Times, but John Thadeus Delane complained that he looked at the Eastern question from the Turkish point of view.

== Crimean War and aftermath ==
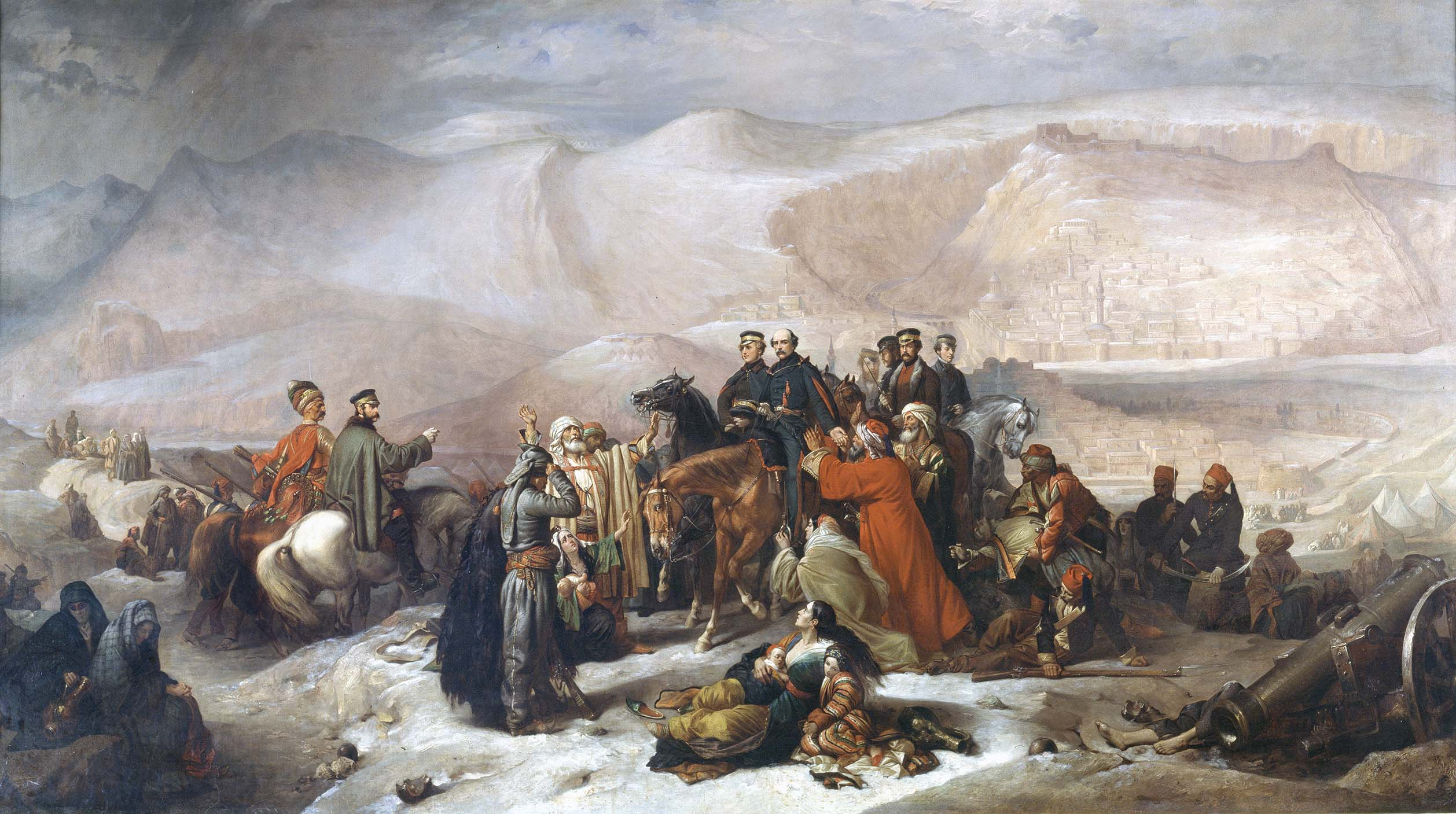
The Capitulation of Kars by Thomas Jones Barker, 1860

When the Crimean War broke out, Sandwith served with Omar Pasha in 1853 in the River Danube campaign. He was then engaged as staff surgeon and interpreter by William Ferguson Beatson, who was raising a corps of Bashi-Bazouks. Beatson and Sandwith went by steamer to Varna to join forces with Omar. Sandwith served with this corps on the Danube in July and August 1854. It was not in combat, but there was much sickness, and Sandwith had to eke out his medical stores by gathering herbs and leeches. Finding that the corps was to be soon disbanded, he offered his services to William Fenwick Williams, who was going to Armenia as British Commissioner with the Turkish army. They were accepted, and on 10 September he left Constantinople for Erzerum.

In February 1855 Williams, now a lieutenant-general in the Turkish army, appointed Sandwith inspector-general of hospitals, placing him at the head of the medical staff. Meanwhile, Colonel Henry Atwell Lake was fortifying Kars, and in the beginning of June, when the siege was imminent, Williams and his staff took up their quarters there. During the Siege of Kars, which lasted till the end of November, Sandwith had to contend with cholera and starvation; and after the assault of 29 September he had wounded men, both Turkish and Russian, on his hands. He had to rely mainly on horseflesh broth for his patients.

When Kars surrendered, and Williams and his staff went to Russia as prisoners, Sandwith was set free by General Nikolay Muravyov, in recognition of his treatment of Russian prisoners. He made his way over the Armenian Highlands via Batumi to Constantinople, and on 9 January 1856 he arrived in London. He was lionised, and told the story of the siege to Queen Victoria and her ministers. He was made C.B., and Oxford gave him the degree of D.C.L. In August he went with Lord Granville to Moscow for the coronation of the czar, and was presented with the Russian order of St. Stanislaus. He also received the cross of the French Legion of Honour.

== Governor of Mauritius ==
Changing career, in February 1857 Sandwith was appointed colonial secretary in Mauritius, and he spent two years there. He had an enquiry from Richard Owen concerning dodo bones, but could not supply any. He did send Owen an aye-aye, pickled in alcohol, that he had brought from Madagascar. He came home on leave in September 1859, and in the following spring he resigned, in hope that he would shortly get another post.

== Balkan interests ==
In 1864 Sandwith paid a visit to Serbia and Bulgaria, and in a letter to The Spectator he predicted that "the next Christian massacre will probably be in Bulgaria". In 1872 he was invited by the municipality of Belgrade to attend the coronation of Milan I of Serbia, and became involved in Serbian politics. When Serbia started the Serbian–Ottoman War in 1876, he went to Belgrade, and worked for the relief of the wounded and the refugees. With William Mure, he visited the Serbian forces on the Drina. Jovan Ristić wished to entrust a peace mission to Sandwith, but it came to nothing. He published articles in the British Quarterly Review.

Pleading the Serbian cause, Sandwith returned to England at the beginning of 1877. He lectured and spoke on behalf of the Serbian refugees. He took back £7,000 for them in March; but fell ill, and returned home. He was awarded Order of the Cross of Takovo.

In October 1877 Sandwith went to Bucharest for three months, as agent for the England-Russian Sick and Wounded Society, a Red Cross organisation of the Russo-Ottoman War. With him were Leslie Maturin and four other British surgeons. He set up a hospice at Putineiu. During the period he argued against British support for Turkey against Russia.

== In politics ==
Sandwith met Richard Cobden in 1856, at the hydro of Sudbrook Park, Petersham. He was drawn into Cobdenite politics, advising on the Near East. A reformer and member of the Jamaica committee, in 1868 he tried unsuccessfully to enter parliament for Marylebone. When the Franco-Prussian War broke out in 1870, he went to France on behalf of the National Aid Society. But he was dissatisfied with the actions of the committee, and did not work with them long.

Sandwith combined with Howard Evans and Frederick Maxse to lobby the Land Tenure Reform Association (LTRA) in 1876. He regarded the Land Reform pamphlet as the only clear legacy of his involvement with the Cobdenites. He became secretary of the LTRA, but the group was dormant.

== Final years ==
In his last years Sandwith concentrated on agitating for an improved water supply for London. In 1880 the state of his wife's health led the couple to winter at Davos, but they were both ill; in the spring he became worse. He died at Paris on 16 May 1881, and was buried at Passy. A Memoir was written by Thomas Humphry Ward, Sandwith's nephew; it was compiled from an autobiography.

== Works ==
Sandwith's major writings were:

- A Narrative of the Siege of Kars, and of the Six Months' Resistance of the Turkish Garrison, under General Williams, to the Russian Army; together with a Narrative of Travels and Adventures in Armenia and Lazistan, with Remarks on the present State of Turkey, London, 1856. His narrative was published by the end of the month of Sandwith's return to London, was well reviewed in The Times by Delane, and sold well.
- The Hekim-Bashi; or the Adventures of Giuseppe Antonelli, a Doctor in the Turkish Service, 2 vols. London, 1864. Under the guise of a novel, this work was an attack on Ottoman misrule.
- Preface to Notes on the South Slavonic Countries in Austria and Turkey in Europe, London, 1865. The work was by Georgina Mackenzie and Adeline Irby.
- The Land and Landlordism (1873)
- Minsterborough: a Tale of English Life, based on reminiscences of his youth at Beverley, 3 vols. London, 1876.
- Shall we fight Russia? An Address to the Working Men of Great Britain, London, 1877.

Earl Russell, the Commune and Christianity was an article in The Fortnightly Review defending the Paris Commune.

== Family ==
Sandwith married, on 29 May 1860, Lucy Hargreaves, whom he had met through Catherine Sinclair. She was the daughter of Robert Hargreaves of Accrington, whose brother William was close to Richard Cobden. They had five children, one of whom, together with Lucy, died in 1882. The only son of the marriage, Lincoln Sandwith of the 8th Hussars, was a historian of the Sandwith family. One of the daughters, Catherine Sinclair married Richard Von Dechend, son of Hermann von Dechend. Another daughter Gladys, married Fleming Mant Sandwith, the tropical medicine authority.

== Notes ==
Attribution

This article incorporates text from a publication now in the public domain: Lee, Sidney, ed. (1897). "Sandwith, Humphry". Dictionary of National Biography. Vol. 50. London: Smith, Elder & Co.
