= Walter Swinburn =

British jockey

Personal information
- Born: 7 August 1961 Oxford, England
- Died: 12 December 2016 (aged 55) London, England, United Kingdom
- Occupation: Jockey
- Spouse: Alison Harris (2002–2012)
- Children: 2

Horse racing career
- Sport: Horse racing
- Career wins: Not found

Major racing wins
- Epsom Derby (1981, 1986, 1995); July Cup (1981, 1986, 1987); King George VI and Queen Elizabeth Stakes (1981); Irish Derby (1983, 1986); Prix de l'Arc de Triomphe (1983); Queen Elizabeth II Stakes (1985, 1989); Coronation Stakes (1986, 1987, 1992, 1998); Dewhurst Stakes (1986); International Stakes (1986, 1993, 1994, 1995); Sussex Stakes (1986, 1989); Epsom Oaks (1987); Irish Oaks (1987, 1988); Nassau Stakes (1987); Phoenix Stakes (1988, 1998); 2,000 Guineas (1988); 1,000 Guineas (1989, 1992, 1993); St. James's Palace Stakes (1989); Lockinge Stakes (1990, 1995); Nassau Stakes (1990, 1994); Ascot Gold Cup (1991); Cheveley Park Stakes (1991, 1992); Coronation Cup (1992); Irish 1,000 Guineas (1992); Champion Stakes (1993); Eclipse Stakes (1994, 1995); Middle Park Stakes (1995) International race wins: Prix de l'Abbaye de Longchamp (1981); Rothmans International (1983); Turf Classic (1983); Washington, D.C. International (1983); Prix de l'Opéra (1983, 1985, 1992); Prix de l'Arc de Triomphe (1983); E. P. Taylor Stakes (1986, 1992); Grand Prix de Paris (1986); Prix du Moulin de Longchamp (1986); Prix Royal-Oak (1990); Prix Hocquart (1992); Prix Noailles (1993); Prix Jacques Le Marois (1993); Prix Jean de Chaudenay (1994); Prix Morny (1995); Breeders' Cup Turf (1996); Grosser Preis von Baden (1996)

Significant horses
- All Along, Green Desert, Hatoof, Indian Queen, Lammtarra, Pilsudski, Shahrastani, Shareef Dancer, Shergar, Shadeed, Zilzal
- Updated on 19 July 2007

Walter Robert John Swinburn (7 August 1961 – 12 December 2016) was a flat racing jockey and trainer who competed in Great Britain and internationally.

== Biography ==
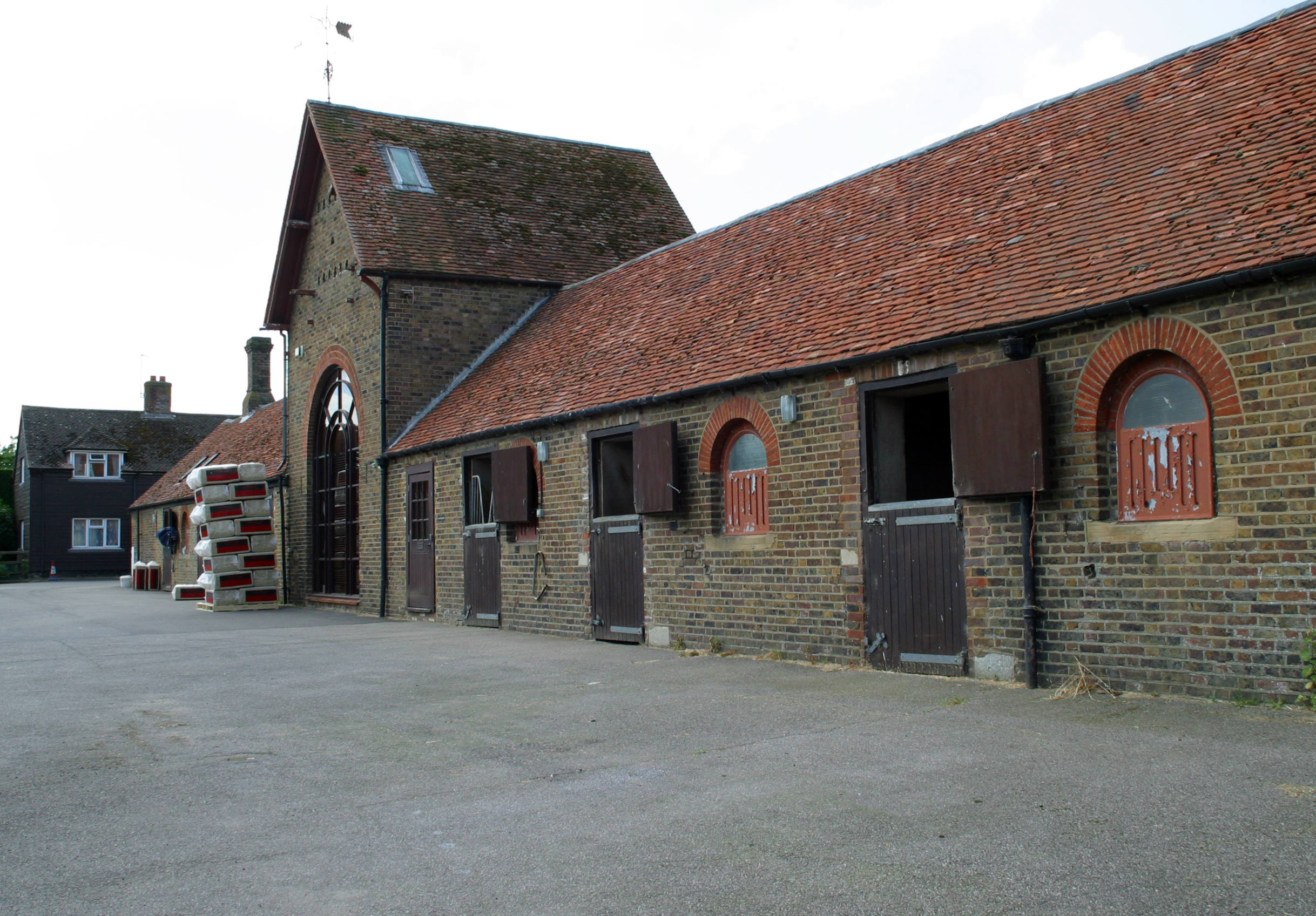
Walter Swinburn Racing Stables

Swinburn was born in Oxford. He was the son of Wally Swinburn, who won the Irish flat racing Champion Jockey title in 1976 and 1977 and was the first jockey to record over 100 winners in an Irish flat season. Nicknamed the "Choirboy", he rode his first winner, Paddy's Luck, on 12 July 1978 at Kempton Park but gained considerable fame for riding the superstar Shergar to victory in The Derby in 1981 by a record 10 lengths. Swinburn went on to win the Derby two more times.

In 1983, he rode All Along to victory in the Prix de l'Arc de Triomphe then the filly captured 1983 Eclipse Award for Horse of the Year honors with three straight major event wins in North America: the Washington, D.C. International at Laurel, Maryland, the Canadian International Stakes (Rothmans International) at Woodbine Racetrack in Toronto, Ontario, and the Turf Classic at Aqueduct Racetrack in Jamaica, New York. In 1996 he rode Pilsudski to victory in the Breeders' Cup Turf at Woodbine Racetrack and the Grosser Preis von Baden at Iffezheim Racecourse in Baden-Baden, Germany.

Swinburn spent four days in a coma after a fall in 1996, which was thought to have caused him to develop epilepsy, and he retired from racing in 2000.

== Trainer ==
After retiring as a winner of numerous Group One races, including eight British Classics, Swinburn began working as a licensed trainer in 2004 and operated Walter Swinburn Racing Stables based at Church Farm in Aldbury, Tring, Hertfordshire. At the end of the 2011 UK Flat Season Walter Swinburn gave up his flat training licence.

Peter [Harris] has been taking a step back and I was here as a salaried trainer. The dispersal sale of his bloodstock last year was the start of it, and he'd made it known that he would continue funding the operation only until October 31 and thereafter it was up to me to fund it myself if I wanted to carry on here. With a big yard like this you need the boxes full up, and Peter is the main owner. To suddenly find you are minus 50 horses would not have been a good starting point, and a big decision had to be made... I'm very confident you haven't seen the last of me as a trainer, but the advice from the accountants...was that it (training at the yard) wasn't viable at the moment

Winners trained by Walter Swinburn
| Year | Wins | Runners |
| 2004 | 5 | 33 |
| 2005 | 43 | 377 |
| 2006 | 37 | 339 |
| 2007 | 26 | 289 |
| 2008 | 34 | 330 |
| 2009 | 41 | 398 |
| 2010 | 52 | 398 |
| 2011 | 32 | 310 |

== Personal life ==
Swinburn married Alison Harris, the daughter of Peter Harris, a retired horse trainer, entrepreneur and multimillionaire in 2002. They had two daughters, Claudia and Camilla. His family home was Stocks House at Aldbury, a golf spa hotel and resort purchased by Harris in 2004 and converted for domestic use.

Swinburn died in London on 12 December 2016 at the age of 55. An inquest in January 2017 heard that Swinburn had fallen from a bathroom window, and the coroner ruled his death an accident.
