= Adolf Jülicher =

German scholar

Adolf Jülicher (26 January 1857 – 2 August 1938) was a German scholar and biblical exegete. Specifically, he was the Professor of Church History and New Testament Exegesis, at the University of Marburg. He was born in Falkenberg near Berlin and died in Marburg.

Jülicher differentiated between Jesus' parables and allegories. His "one-point' analysis identified parables as having a single point of reference to the real world, rather than several, as in an allegory. His approach has not held up completely to later research, but it remains foundational to all investigations of parables and allegories.

== Ideas ==
=== The Messianic Secret ===
Jülicher, along with Johannes Weiss, was instrumental in forging a consensus position on the new theory of "Messianic Secret" motif in the Gospel of Mark. Before Jülicher, William Wrede had theorized that the historical Jesus had not claimed to be the Messiah, but that the early church had claimed that he was. According to this theory, the author of Mark's gospel had invented the idea of the "Messianic Secret", whereby Jesus attempted to hide his identity, and only revealed it to a very few insiders. Conservative interpreters of Mark's gospel, exemplified by William Sanday and Albert Schweitzer, believed instead that Mark's portrayal of Jesus was largely historical. Scholarship was strictly divided for a time, with neither side considering the other's views at all valid.

Jülicher helped to bridge this divide by suggesting that while many of Wrede's suggestions were correct, other aspects of the Messianic Secret may have been historical. He called Mark's portrayal of Jesus as a taciturn Messiah "half-historical", and allowed for the analysis of some of Mark's presentation as an accurate depiction (while, at the same time, warning against an uncritical acceptance of these same statements). This helped pave the way to many post-Bultmann theories in the 1950s.

=== Parables ===
Jülicher also helped to change the understanding of the parables of Jesus among scholars, emphasizing that there was usually a single point of comparison between the story and what it represented. He made a distinction between parable and allegory, claiming that a true allegory was a literary type of which Jesus was not aware and did not use. All specific allegorical interpretations of the parables, whether by later church fathers or in the gospels themselves, must have come from sources other than the historical Jesus. In contrast, most Medieval scholars saw the parables as elaborate allegories, with each aspect representing something specific. Later, scholars such as C. H. Dodd and Joachim Jeremias built on Jülicher's work, emphasizing each parable's significance in regard to the "Kingdom of God". Nearly all subsequent scholarship has followed Jülicher's ideas in this, although some have seen a slightly wider range of comparisons that he proposed.

=== Other Ideas ===
In his thorough Introduction to the New Testament, composed in 1904, Jülicher wrote at length about many aspects of Biblical criticism. This influential work was still being discussed as contemporary thirty years later. In this text, he gives support to the two-source hypothesis, referring to Q as "a collection of the sayings of Jesus, composed without any exercise in conscious art." He held that parts were devised before Mark, and parts after Mark, with no standard version ever existing. Although scholarship on Q is deeply divided and still without consensus, most researchers today believe Q to have been organized, either according to a series of catchwords or as a primitive liturgy, and later editions acknowledge this fact. His Introduction was also of interest in its very late dating of the Epistle of James, arguing that it was a disorganized collection of ethical exhortations written after even I Clement. Most of the body of An Introduction succinctly described the latest biblical scholarship of its day.

== Works in English ==
- An introduction to the New Testament (translated by Janet Penrose Ward, 1904)
- Encyclopaedia Biblica (1903) - contributor

== See also ==
- List of New Testament Latin manuscripts
- See the article at de.wikipedia.org for Jülicher's writings in German
