= Hermann von Dechend =

- Born: Hermann Friedrich Alexander Dechend; 2 April 1814; Marienwerder, Prussia
- Died: 30 April 1890 (aged 76); Berlin, Prussia, German Empire
- Occupation: President of the Reichsbank
- Spouse: Adelgunde Wilke (20 November 1823–1915)
- Children: Elise Ruge née Dechend, Susanne née Dechend (1859–1929), Walter Hermann v. Dechend (1867–1931)

Hermann Friedrich Alexander Dechend, in 1865 ennobled as von Dechend (2 April 1814 – 30 April 1890), was a senior Prussian civil servant and politician who served as the first President of the Reichsbank.

== Biography ==
Dechend was born in Marienwerder, West Prussia (today Kwidzyn, Poland), the son of a lawyer, Theodor Dechend. He passed his Abitur (school leaving examination) in Marienwerder and studied law and Cameralism at the universities of Berlin and Bonn. Dechend began his professional career at the local court and in the city council of Marienwerder and in 1846 moved to Arnsberg to take up a post in the administration of that Regierungsbezirk (local government district).

In 1848 Dechend took charge of the newly founded public loan office in Berlin and in 1851 became a member of the governing body of the Bank of Prussia. He occupied several government positions in Berlin before becoming the vice-president of the Bank of Prussia in 1863 and its President in 1864. After the unification of Germany he became the first President of the Reichsbank in 1876.

Dechend was a member of the Prussian House of Representatives for the Free Conservative Party in 1867-69 and of the Prussian House of Lords in 1872-90.

== Family ==
Hermann Friedrich Alexander Dechend married Adelgunde Auguste Wilke (20 November 1823 – 1915) and was ennobled as von Dechend in 1865. His daughter Susanne (1859–1929) married the Prussian army officer Hugo von Kathen (1855–1932), while his granddaughter Adelgunde Margaret Beatrice von Dechend (1911–1983) was the wife of the Welsh character actor Hugh Emrys Griffith (1912–1980). His son Richard Von Dechend married Catherine Sinclair Sandwith, daughter of Humphrey Sandwith on the 2nd of April 1887 in Holy Trinity Church, Paddington, London, England.
