= Coram's Fields =

Urban open space in London, England

Coordinates: 51.5247°N 0.1197°W

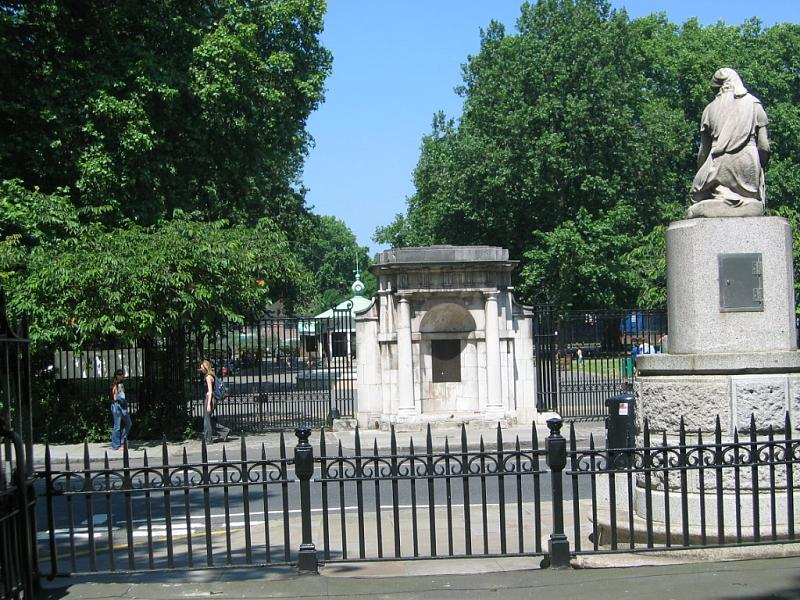
Entrance gate to Coram's Fields

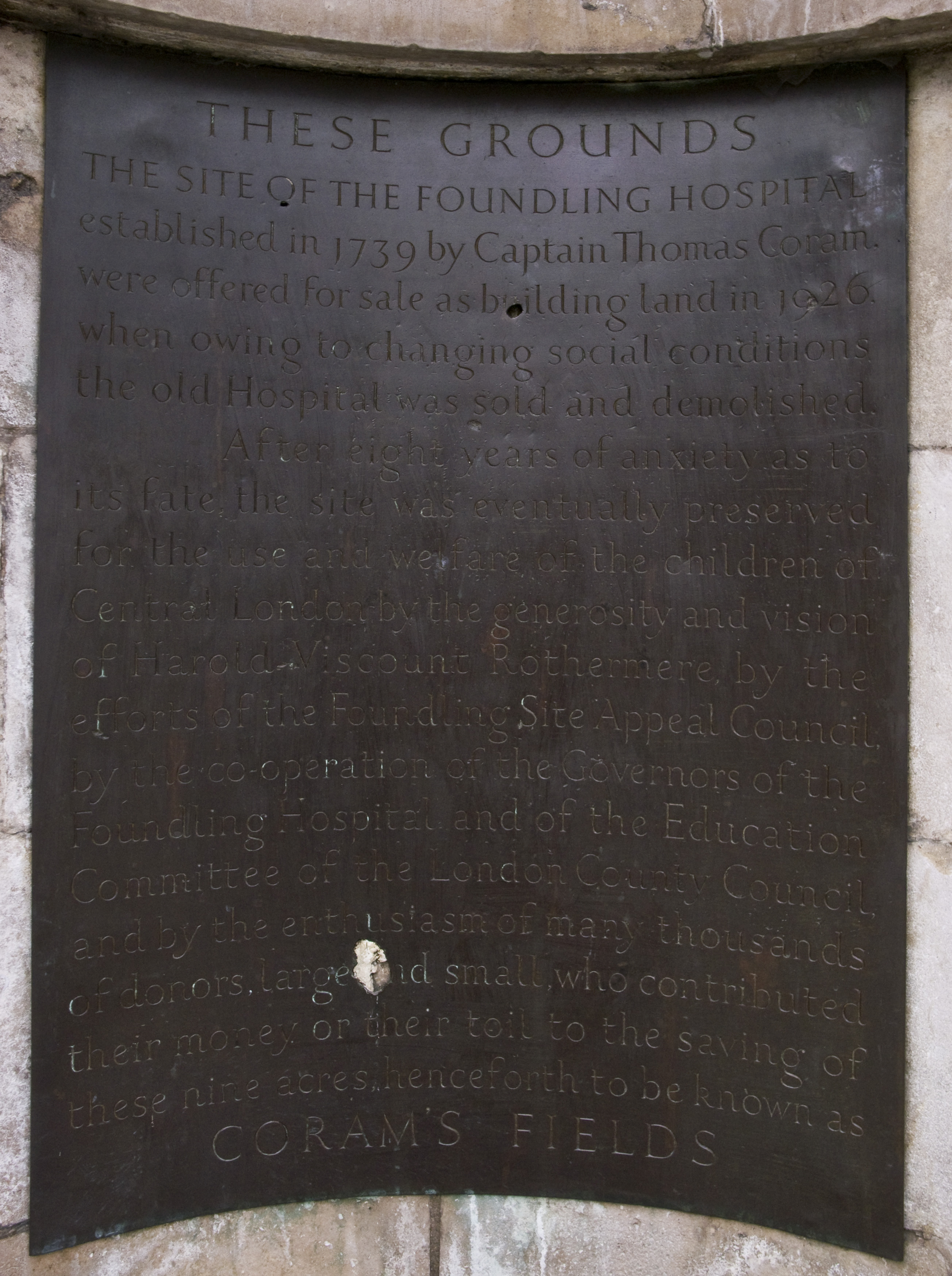
Bronze plaque at entrance

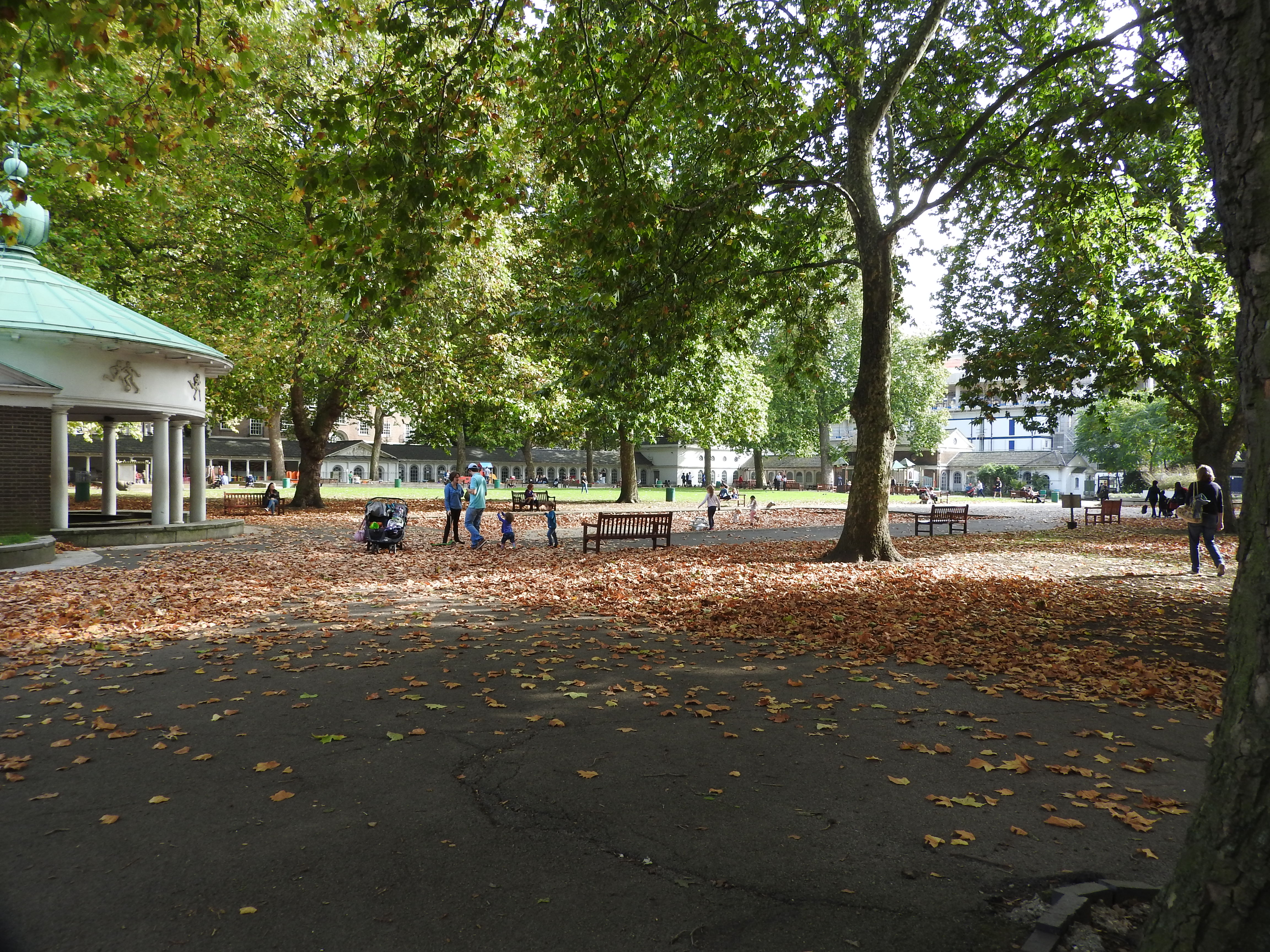
Autumn 2017

Coram's Fields is an independent children’s charity and a seven acre (2.8 ha) urban open space in the Kings Cross area of the London Borough of Camden. Adults are only permitted to enter if accompanied by children.

== History ==
The park is situated on the former site of the Foundling Hospital, established by Thomas Coram in what was then named Lamb's Conduit Field in 1739. In the 1920s The Foundling Hospital was relocated outside London to Ashlyns School in Berkhamsted, Hertfordshire, and the site was earmarked for redevelopment. However, a campaign organised by Janet Trevelyan and fundraising by local residents and a donation from Harold Harmsworth, 1st Viscount Rothermere led to the creation of the current park that opened in 1936.

== Services and facilities ==
Coram's Fields provides services for children and young people in the local community, including an after school and holiday programme, a sports programme, a youth centre and an early years programme which includes a nursery and drop-in.

The park includes three eight-a-side football pitches, two tennis courts, a stickball field, a basketball court, a children's playground, sand pits, a pets corner and a café.

== Neighbourhood ==
To the west is Brunswick Square, and to the east is Mecklenburgh Square (bordered by Goodenough College to the south), two historical London squares. To the north is the Thomas Coram Foundation and St George's Gardens. To the south are Guilford Street and Great Ormond Street Hospital. The Thomas Coram Foundation for Children (the successor charity to the Foundling Hospital) and the Foundling Museum housing the art collections of the former Hospital, are based in buildings nearby.

== Management and planning designations ==
Coram's Fields is owned and run by an independent registered charity, officially named Coram's Fields and the Harmsworth Memorial Playground.

Coram's Fields, and Brunswick and Mecklenburgh Squares are jointly listed Grade II on the Register of Historic Parks and Gardens.
