= Red Rose Travel =

British bus company

Red Rose Travel bus in Watford, Hertfordshire

Red Rose Travel is a British bus company based in Haddenham, Buckinghamshire, UK, that operates bus services in Buckinghamshire, Hertfordshire and Oxfordshire. It was founded in 1994 by director Taj Khan and Chris Day.
