= Arnold Ward =

British politician and cricketer

- Arnold Ward c. 1906
- Born: Arnold Sandwith Ward; 1876
- Died: 1950 (aged 73–74)
- Occupations: Journalist, politician
- Parents: Humphry Ward; Mary Augusta Arnold
- Relatives: Janet Trevelyan (sister)

Huxley and Arnold family tree.

Arnold Sandwith Ward (1876 – 1950) was an English journalist and Conservative Party politician. He served as the MP for the constituency of Watford between 1910 and 1918.

== Biography ==
Ward was the son of Humphry "Thomas" Ward, a fellow and tutor of Brasenose College and Mary Augusta Ward, a popular author; grandson of Tom Arnold; greatgrandson of Thomas Arnold, the famous headmaster of Rugby School. He was educated at Eton and Balliol College, Oxford.

While at Oxford he played one first-class cricket match for the university side as a lower-order right-handed batsman and medium-pace right-arm bowler; he also played Minor Counties cricket for Hertfordshire and Buckinghamshire between 1896 and 1905.

== Career ==
After working as a special correspondent for The Times in Egypt, the Sudan and India from 1899 to 1902, and as a solicitor, he was elected to parliament in 1910.

His mother was a founder of the Women's National Anti-Suffrage League, and Ward spoke in support of their cause as an MP.

A pre-war officer in the part-time Hertfordshire Yeomanry he volunteered for overseas service on the outbreak of the First World War, and served with A Squadron of the 1/1st Hertfordshire Yeomanry in Egypt August 1914 – June 1915. He was then assigned commandant of a convalescent camp on Cyprus June–August 1915, and returned to Egypt January - June 1916. From November 1916 to February 1917 he was attached 3rd Battalion The King's Own Scottish Borderers, then to the Machine Gun Corps, February–May 1917.

For the 1918 general election the Conservative party dropped him as candidate in favour of Dennis Herbert. The 1918 election was the first to be held after the Representation of the People Act 1918, which meant it was the first general election in which women could vote. Ward's Anti-Suffrage stance, which lasted after many others had dropped their objections, would have been a major liability.

On the death of his mother in 1920 the family home, Stocks House at Aldbury in Hertfordshire, had to be sold to pay off his gambling debts.

Parliament of the United Kingdom
Preceded by Nathaniel Micklem	Member of Parliament for Watford; Jan 1910 – 1918	Succeeded by Sir Dennis Herbert
