= Humphry Sandwith (1792–1874) =

English physician (1792–1874)

Humphry Sandwith III
- Born: 25 May 1792
- Died: 25 July 1874 (aged 82)
- Occupation: Physician
- Spouse: Jane Ward
- Children: Humphry Sandwith IV

Humphry Sandwith III (25 May 1792 – 25 July 1874), was an English physician and prominent Methodist.

== Life ==
Sandwith was born in Helmsley, Yorkshire, the son of Humphry Sandwith II (1746–1809), another medical man, and Hannah Backhouse. He had a brother, Thomas Sandwith (1789–1867). He went into medical practice as a surgeon at Bridlington, in 1816.

In 1834, Sandwith moved to London. The reason was that he took the chance to become the first editor of The Watchman, a new Wesleyan Methodist journal, initially published in January 1835. He had made a reputation among Wesleyan Methodists, both as a controversialist, and as someone concerned to circulate their news. The Watchman became a significant and independent voice for them.

In 1841, Sandwith moved on to Kingston upon Hull, where he became physician to Hull General Infirmary. He graduated M.D. and was a Fellow of the Royal College of Physicians. He was replaced as editor of The Watchman in 1842.

Sandwith died on 25 July 1874, at Todwick Rectory.

== Works ==
- A History of the Epidemic Fever which prevailed in Bridlington and the Neighbourhood, in the years 1818 and 1819 (1821)
- A Reply to Lord John Russell's Animadversions on Wesleyan Methodism, in his "Memoirs of the Affairs of Europe", London 1830, pamphlet
- Remarks on the theory and treatment of scarlet fever: with brief notices of the disease as it prevailed epidemically at Bridlington, in 1831 (1835)
- Memoir of the Rev. Thomas Powell (1852)

== Family ==
Sandwith married Jane Ward, daughter of the merchant Isaac Ward. Humphry Sandwith, Thomas Backhouse Sandwith, the Rev. Henry Sandwith and Geoffrey Sandwith M.D. were their sons. Their daughter Jane married Henry Ward, and was the mother of Humphry Ward.
