= Thomas Humphry Ward =

Humphry Ward
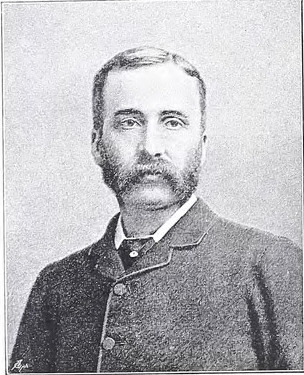
- Born: Thomas Humphry Ward; 9 November 1845; Kingston upon Hull, England
- Died: 6 May 1926 (aged 80)
- Occupation(s): Author, journalist
- Spouse: Mary Augusta Arnold (m. 1872; died 1920)
- Children: 3, including Arnold and Janet

Thomas Humphry Ward (9 November 1845 – 6 May 1926) was an English author and journalist, (usually writing as Humphry Ward) best known as the husband of the author Mary Augusta Ward, who wrote under the name Mrs. Humphry Ward.

== Life ==
He was born in Kingston upon Hull, England; his parents were Henry Ward, a cleric, and Jane Sandwith, daughter of Humphry Sandwith III, a surgeon there. He studied at Merchant Taylors' School and at Brasenose College, Oxford, at which he became a Fellow in 1869 and a tutor in 1870.

His compositions consisted of editorials which he submitted to The Times. Additionally, he edited a four-volume anthology, The English Poets (1880); Men of the Reign (1885); The Reign of Queen Victoria (1887); English Art in the Public Galleries of London (1888); and Men of the Time, which ran to 12 editions. He wrote alone Humphry Sandwith, a Memoir (1884), and jointly The Oxford Spectator (1868) and Romney (1904). Elected a member of the Athenaeum Club, London in 1885, he also completed the centenary history of the club, a work started by Henry Richard Tedder before his death, and published in 1926, the year he himself died.

Ward acted (presumably) as an agent for numerous acquisitions of British Old Master paintings by the dealer Thomas Agnew & Sons. He is recorded as having sold portraits by George Romney (painter) including Jane Dawkes Robinson, Captain W. Scott, and Edward Addison, alongside works by Sir Thomas Lawrence and Alexander Nasmyth.

== Family ==
Ward married Mary Augusta Arnold, who became a best-selling novelist of various genres including victorian values as Mrs Humphry Ward. Arnold was the daughter of a fellow Oxford academic, Tom Arnold and the marriage connected Ward to the influential intellectual families of the Arnolds and the Huxleys. They lived at 17 Bradmore Road in North Oxford, which Ward leased in 1872. They had one son and two daughters:

- Dorothy Mary Ward (1874–1964)
- Arnold Sandwith Ward MP (1876–1950), journalist and politician
- Janet Penrose Ward (1879–1956), author and activist, married G. M. Trevelyan
