= G. M. Trevelyan =

British historian and academic (1876–1962)

G. M. Trevelyan OM CBE FRS FBA
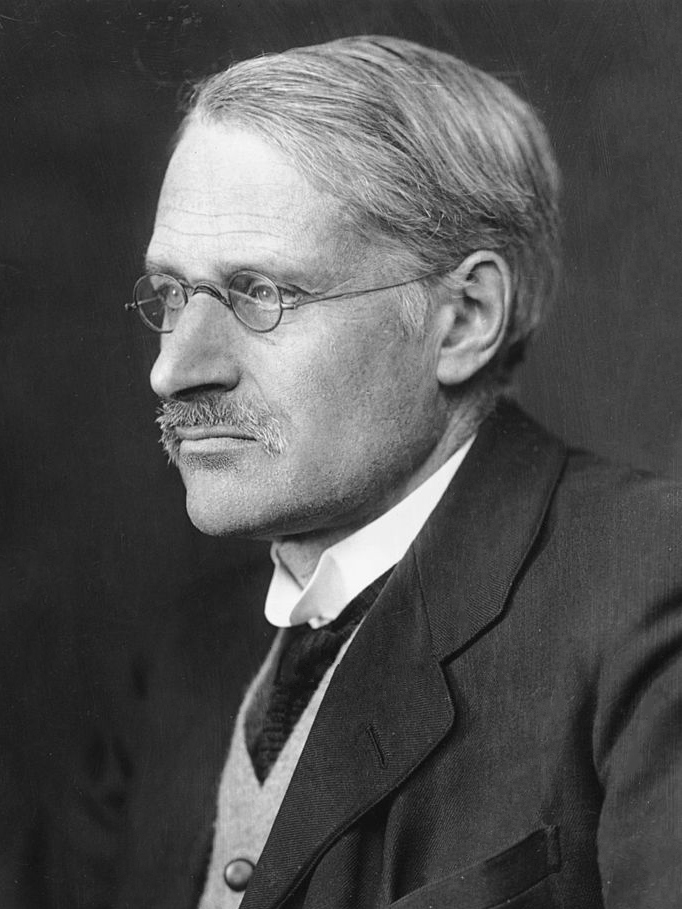
- Trevelyan photographed by George Charles Beresford in 1926

6th Chancellor of Durham University
- In office 1950–1957
- Preceded by: The Marquess of Londonderry
- Succeeded by: The Earl of Scarbrough

Master of Trinity College, Cambridge
- In office 1940–1951
- Preceded by: Sir J. J. Thomson
- Succeeded by: Edgar Adrian, 1st Baron Adrian

Regius Professor of History University of Cambridge
- In office 1927–1943
- Preceded by: J. B. Bury
- Succeeded by: Sir George Clark

Personal details
- Born: George Macaulay Trevelyan; 16 February 1876 Stratford-upon-Avon, Warwickshire, England
- Died: 21 July 1962 (aged 86) Cambridge, Cambridgeshire, England
- Resting place: Holy Trinity Church, Chapel Stile, Great Langdale, Cumbria
- Spouse(s): Janet Trevelyan, née Ward (m. 1904; died 1956)
- Children: 3
- Occupation: Historian

George Macaulay Trevelyan OM CBE FRS FBA (16 February 1876 – 21 July 1962) was an English historian and academic. He was a Fellow of Trinity College, Cambridge, from 1898 to 1903. He then spent more than twenty years as a full-time author. He returned to the University of Cambridge and was Regius Professor of History from 1927 to 1943. He served as Master of Trinity College from 1940 to 1951. In retirement, he was Chancellor of Durham University.

Trevelyan was the third son of Sir George Otto Trevelyan, 2nd Baronet, and great-nephew of Thomas Babington Macaulay. He espoused Macaulay's staunch liberal Whig principles in accessible works of literate narrative unfettered by scholarly neutrality, his style becoming old-fashioned in the course of his long and productive career. The historian E. H. Carr considered Trevelyan to be one of the last historians of the Whig tradition.

Many of his writings promoted the Whig Party, an important British political movement from the 17th to the mid-19th centuries, as well as its successor, the Liberal Party. Whigs and Liberals believed the common people had a more positive effect on history than did royalty and that democratic government would bring about steady social progress.

Trevelyan's history is engaged and partisan. Of his Garibaldi trilogy, "reeking with bias", he remarked in his essay "Bias in History": "Without bias, I should never have written them at all. For I was moved to write them by a poetical sympathy with the passions of the Italian patriots of the period, which I retrospectively shared."

== Early life ==
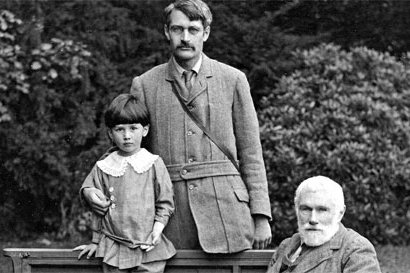
Trevelyan in 1910 with his eldest son, Theo, and father, Sir G. O. Trevelyan. Theo died of appendicitis in 1911.

Trevelyan was born into late Victorian Britain in Welcombe House, Stratford-on-Avon, the large house and estate owned by his maternal grandfather, Robert Needham Philips, a wealthy Lancashire merchant and the Liberal Member of Parliament (MP) for Bury. Today Welcombe is a hotel and spa for tourists visiting Shakespeare's birthplace. On his paternal side, he was the third son of Sir George Trevelyan, 2nd Baronet, who had served as Secretary for Scotland, under Liberal Prime Ministers William Gladstone, and the Earl of Rosebery, and the grandson of Sir Charles Trevelyan, 1st Baronet, who had served as a civil servant and had faced considerable criticism for his and the British government's handling of the Great Famine of Ireland.

Trevelyan's parents used Welcombe as a winter resort after they inherited it in 1890. They looked upon Wallington Hall, the Trevelyan family estate in Northumberland, as their real home. After attending Wixenford and Harrow, where he specialised in history, Trevelyan studied at Trinity College, Cambridge, where he was a member of the secret society the Cambridge Apostles and founder of the still existing Lake Hunt, a hare and hounds chase where both hounds and hares are human. In 1898, he won a fellowship at Trinity with a dissertation that was published the following year as England in the Age of Wycliffe. One professor at the university, Lord Acton, enchanted the young Trevelyan with his great wisdom and his belief in moral judgement and individual liberty.

== Garibaldi ==
Trevelyan made his own reputation by depicting Italian patriot Giuseppe Garibaldi as a great hero who stood for British ideals of liberty. According to historian David Cannadine:

[Trevelyan's] great work was his Garibaldi trilogy (1907–11), which established his reputation as the outstanding literary historian of his generation. It depicted Garibaldi as a Carlylean hero—poet, patriot, and man of action—whose inspired leadership created the Italian nation. For Trevelyan, Garibaldi was the champion of freedom, progress, and tolerance, who vanquished the despotism, reaction, and obscurantism of the Austrian empire and the Neapolitan monarchy. The books were also notable for their vivid evocation of landscape (Trevelyan had himself followed the course of Garibaldi's marches), for their innovative use of documentary and oral sources, and for their spirited accounts of battles and military campaigns.

Historian Lucy Voakes argues that his Garibaldi project was part of a larger movement among English intellectuals to consolidate, celebrate and sometimes critique liberal culture and politics. She sees Trevelyan's conception of the hero, and his study of the Italian Risorgimento emerging from his promotion of a distinctly "English" patriotism based upon Whig gradualism, parliamentary monarchy and a hierarchical anti-republicanism.

== Role in education ==
Trevelyan lectured at Cambridge until 1903, at which point he left academic life to become a full-time writer. In 1927, he returned to the university to take up a position as Regius Professor of Modern History, where the single student whose doctorate he agreed to supervise was J. H. Plumb (1936). During his professorship, he was also familiar with Guy Burgess – he gave a positive reference for Burgess when he applied for a post at the BBC in 1935, describing him as a "first rate man", but also stating that "He has passed through the communist measles that so many of our clever young men go through, and is well out of it". In 1940 he was appointed as Master of Trinity College and served in the post until 1951 when he retired.

Trevelyan declined the presidency of the British Academy but served as chancellor of Durham University from 1950 to 1958. Trevelyan College at Durham University is named after him. He won the 1920 James Tait Black Memorial Prize for the biography Lord Grey of the Reform Bill, was elected a fellow of the British Academy in 1925, made a fellow of the Royal Society in 1950, and was an honorary doctor of many universities including Cambridge.

== Place in British ideas ==
Shocked by the horrors of the Great War he saw as an ambulance driver just behind the front lines, Trevelyan became more appreciative of conservatism as a positive force, and less insistent that progress was inevitable. In History of England (1926), he searched for the deepest meaning of English history. Cannadine says he reported they were "the nation's evolution and identity: parliamentary government, the rule of law, religious toleration, freedom from continental interference or involvement, and a global horizon of maritime supremacy and imperial expansion".

Cannadine concluded in G.M. Trevelyan: A Life in History (1992):

During the first half of the twentieth century Trevelyan was the most famous, the most honored, the most influential and the most widely read historian of his generation. He was a scion of the greatest historical dynasty that (Britain) has ever produced. He knew and corresponded with many of the greatest figures of his time... For fifty years, Trevelyan acted as a public moralist, public teacher and public benefactor, wielding unchallenged cultural authority among the governing and the educated classes of his day.

Once called "probably the most widely read historian in the world; perhaps in the history of the world", Trevelyan saw how two world wars shook the belief in progress. Historiography had changed and the belief in progress declined. Roy Jenkins argued:

Trevelyan's reputation as a historian barely survived his death in 1962. He is now amongst the great unread, widely regarded by the professionals of a later generation as a pontificating old windbag, as short on cutting edge as on reliable facts.

On the other hand, J. H. Plumb argued:

What is perhaps most frequently forgotten, or ignored, is the skill of his literary craftsmanship. Trevelyan was a born writer and a natural storyteller; and this, among historians, is a rare gift ... If one quality is to be singled out, is should be this, for all historians he is the poet of English history ... His work has one other great and enduring merit: the tradition within which it was written. The Victorian liberals and their Edwardian successors have made one of the greatest contributions to science and to culture ever made by a ruling class. To these by birth and by instinct Trevelyan belonged.

== Other activities ==
During World War I, Trevelyan commanded a British Red Cross ambulance unit on the Italian front; his defective eyesight meant he was unfit for military service. On 24 December 1915, he was personally decorated by king Victor Emmanuel III of Italy with the Silver Medal of Military Valor for having bravely cleared out a military hospital made the target of Austro-Hungarian fire.

In 1919, he delivered the British Academy's Italian Lecture.

Trevelyan was the first president of the Youth Hostels Association and the YHA headquarters are called Trevelyan House in his honour. He worked throughout his career on behalf of the National Trust, in preserving not merely historic houses, but historic landscapes. He was an International Honorary Member of the American Academy of Arts and Sciences (1931) and an International Member of the American Philosophical Society. Trevelyan was also a member of the Cambridge Apostles.

== Trevelyan's works ==
Trevelyan was a prolific author:

- England in the Age of Wycliffe, 1368–1520. Longmans, Green, and Company. 1899. His first book, based on his fellowship dissertation, was published when Trevelyan was just 23. The title of this work is somewhat misleading since it concentrates on the political, social and religious conditions of England during the later years of Wycliffe's life only. Six of the nine chapters are devoted to the years 1377–1385, while the last two treat the history of the Lollards from 1382 until the Reformation. The work is critical of Roman Catholicism in favour of Wycliffe.
- England Under the Stuarts. Psychology Press. 2002. ISBN 978-0-415-27785-3. Covers 1603 to 1714.
- The Poetry and Philosophy of George Meredith. 1906.
- Garibaldi's Defence of the Roman Republic. Longmans, Green and Company. 1907. This volume marks the entry of a new foreign historian in the field of Italian Risorgimento, a period much neglected, or, unworthily treated, outside of Italy.
- Garibaldi and the Thousand. Longmans, Green, and Company. 1909.
- Garibaldi and the Making of Italy. Longmans, Green and Company. 1911. ISBN 978-1-84212-473-4. (2001 ed.)
- The Life of John Bright. 1913.
- Trevelyan, G. M. (1949). Clio, A Muse and Other Essays.
- Scenes From Italy's War. T. C. and E. C. Jack. 1919.
- The Recreations of an Historian. 1919.
- Lord Grey of the Reform Bill. 1920.
- British History in the Nineteenth Century, 1782–1901. London, New York, Longmans, Green, and Co. 1922.
- Manin and the Venetian Revolution of 1848. 1923.
- History of England. Garden City, N.Y., Doubleday. 1953. (Three editions: 1926, 1937, 1945)
- Select Documents for Queen Anne's Reign, Down to the Union with Scotland 1702-7. 1929.
- England Under Queen Anne. Longmans. 1930. His magnum opus in 3 volumes: "Blenheim" (1930), "Ramillies and the Union with Scotland" (1932), "Peace and the Protestant Succession" (1934).
- Sir George Otto Trevelyan: A Memoir. 1932.
- Grey of Fallodon. 1937.
- The English Revolution, 1688–1689. T. Butterworth Limited. 1965 [1938]. ISBN 978-7-240-01048-8. Portrays James II as a tyrant whose excesses led directly to the Glorious Revolution.
- A Shortened History of England. Penguin Books. 1987.
- Trevelyan, George Macaulay (1978) [1944]. English Social History. Longman. ISBN 978-0-582-48488-7. Published during World War Two, it painted a nostalgic picture of England's glorious past as the beacon of liberty and progress, stirring patriotic feelings and becoming his best selling book, also his last major history book.
- Trevelyan, George Macaulay (1943). Trinity College: An Historical Sketch. The University Press. ISBN 0-903258-01-3.
- History and the Reader. 1945.
- Trevelyan, George Macaulay (1949). An Autobiography and Other Essays. Books for Libraries Press. ISBN 0-8369-2205-0.
- Carlyle: An Anthology. 1953.
- A Layman's Love of Letters. 1954.

== See also ==
- Historiography of the United Kingdom
- Liberalism in the United Kingdom

Academic offices
Preceded by J. B. Bury	Regius Professor of Modern History at the University of Cambridge; 1927–1943	Succeeded by George Clark
Preceded by Sir Joseph Thomson	Master of Trinity College, Cambridge; 1940–1951	Succeeded by Edgar Adrian
Preceded by The Marquess of Londonderry	Chancellor of the University of Durham; 1950–1957	Succeeded by The Earl of Scarbrough
